= Parineeti Chopra filmography =

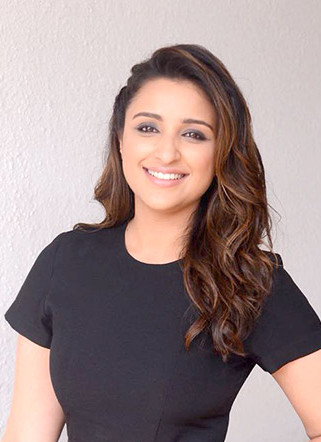
Chopra in 2017

Parineeti Chopra is an Indian actress who works primarily in Hindi films. She made her acting debut with a supporting role in the 2011 romantic comedy Ladies vs Ricky Bahl, winning the Filmfare Award for Best Female Debut. Following her debut, Chopra subsequently starred in commercially successful films including the action drama Ishaqzaade (2012), the romantic comedy Shuddh Desi Romance (2013) and the romantic comedy-drama Hasee Toh Phasee (2014), establishing herself as a leading actress in Hindi cinema. For her performance in Ishaqzaade, she received the National Film Award – Special Mention.

In 2014, Chopra starred in the romantic comedy Daawat-e-Ishq and the action comedy Kill Dil. Both films underperformed commercially. Following these releases, she took a break from full-time acting. After a three-year hiatus Chopra returned with the 2017 romantic drama Meri Pyaari Bindu. Later that year, she appeared in Golmaal Again, which became her highest-grossing film to date. She then starred in Namaste England (2018), which emerged as a critical and commercial disaster at the box-office. In 2019, she appeared in the historical war drama Kesari. The film was a major commercial success at the box-office, grossing over ₹201 crore (US$21 million) worldwide.

In 2021, Chopra headlined the Netflix thriller The Girl on the Train, followed by the black comedy Sandeep Aur Pinky Faraar and the biographical sports film Saina. Her performance in Saina was widely praised, with several critics noting her as "the best part of the film" and earned her a Filmfare Award for Best Actress nomination for the former film. However, both Sandeep Aur Pinky Faraar and Saina were box office bombs. Her subsequent releases include the espionage thriller Code Name: Tiranga (2022) and a supporting role in the ensemble film Uunchai (2022). The following year, Chopra starred in Mission Raniganj (2023). Her only release of 2024 was the biographical drama Amar Singh Chamkila (2024). The film was the most-watched Hindi streaming film of the year.

== Films ==
List of Parineeti Chopra film credits
Year	Title	Role(s)	Notes	Ref.
2011	Ladies vs Ricky Bahl	Dimple Chaddha		
2012	Ishaqzaade	Zoya Qureshi		
2013	Shuddh Desi Romance	Gayatri		
2014	Hasee Toh Phasee	Dr. Meeta Solanki		
2014	Daawat-e-Ishq	Gulrez Qadir		
2014	Kill Dil	Disha		
2014	Dor	Ria	Short film	
2015	Girl Rising India – Woh Padhegi, Woh Udegi	Mariama	Hindi version of Richard E. Robbins's documentary	
2016	Dishoom	Muskaan Raza Qureshi	Cameo appearance	
2017	Meri Pyaari Bindu	Bindu Shankar Narayanan		
2017	Golmaal Again	Khushi Chauhan		
2018	Namaste England	Jasmeet Kaur Randhawa		
2019	Kesari	Jeevani Kaur		
2019	Jabariya Jodi	Babli Yadav		
2019	Frozen II	Anna	Hindi version	
2021	The Girl on the Train	Mira Kapoor		
2021	Sandeep Aur Pinky Faraar	Sandeep Kaur Walia		
2021	Saina	Saina Nehwal		
2022	Code Name: Tiranga	Durga Devi Singh / Ismat (Note: Chopra played a single character with two or more names.)		
2022	Uunchai	Shraddha Gupta		
2023	Mission Raniganj	Nirdosh Kaur Gill		
2024	Amar Singh Chamkila	Amarjot Kaur		
2026	Reporting Live	Sandhya Yadav		

== Television ==
List of Parineeti Chopra television credits
Year	Title	Role	Notes	Ref.
2013	3rd Stardust Awards	Co-host		
2014	India's Best Cinestars Ki Khoj	Mentor	Special appearance	
2014	Yeh Hai Aashiqui	Meeta Solanki	Special appearance	
2015	11th Star Guild Awards	Co-host		
2015	Man's World	Doctor	Cameo appearance	
2016	3rd Times of India Film Awards	Co-host		
2017	Lip Sing Battle	Contestant		
2018	63rd Filmfare Awards	Co-host		
2018	Kasautii Zindagii Kay	Babli Yadav	Special appearance	
2022	Hunarbaaz: Desh Ki Shaan	Judge		
2022	Khatra Khatra Khatra	Herself	Guest	

== Web series ==
List of Parineeti Chopra web series credit
Year	Title	Role(s)	Ref.
2026	Shaque: Trust No One	Anvita Dutt	

== Discography ==
List of Parineeti Chopra Discography credits
Year	Film	Song	Composer(s)	Co-singer(s)	Ref.
2017	Meri Pyaari Bindu	"Maana Ke Hum Yaar Nahin"	Sachin–Jigar		
2017	Meri Pyaari Bindu	"Maana Ke Hum Yaar Nahi" (Duet)	Sachin–Jigar	Sonu Nigam	
2019	Kesari	"Teri Mitti" (Female)	Arko		
2021	The Girl on the Train	"Matlabi Yariyan" (Unplugged)	Vipin Patwa		
2023	Parineeti Wedding Video	"O Piya"	Gaurav Dutta		
2024	Amar Singh Chamkila	"Tu Kya Jaane" (Cover Version)	A. R. Rahman		

== See also ==
- List of awards and nominations received by Parineeti Chopra
