= List of awards and nominations received by Parineeti Chopra =

Parineeti Chopra awards and nominations
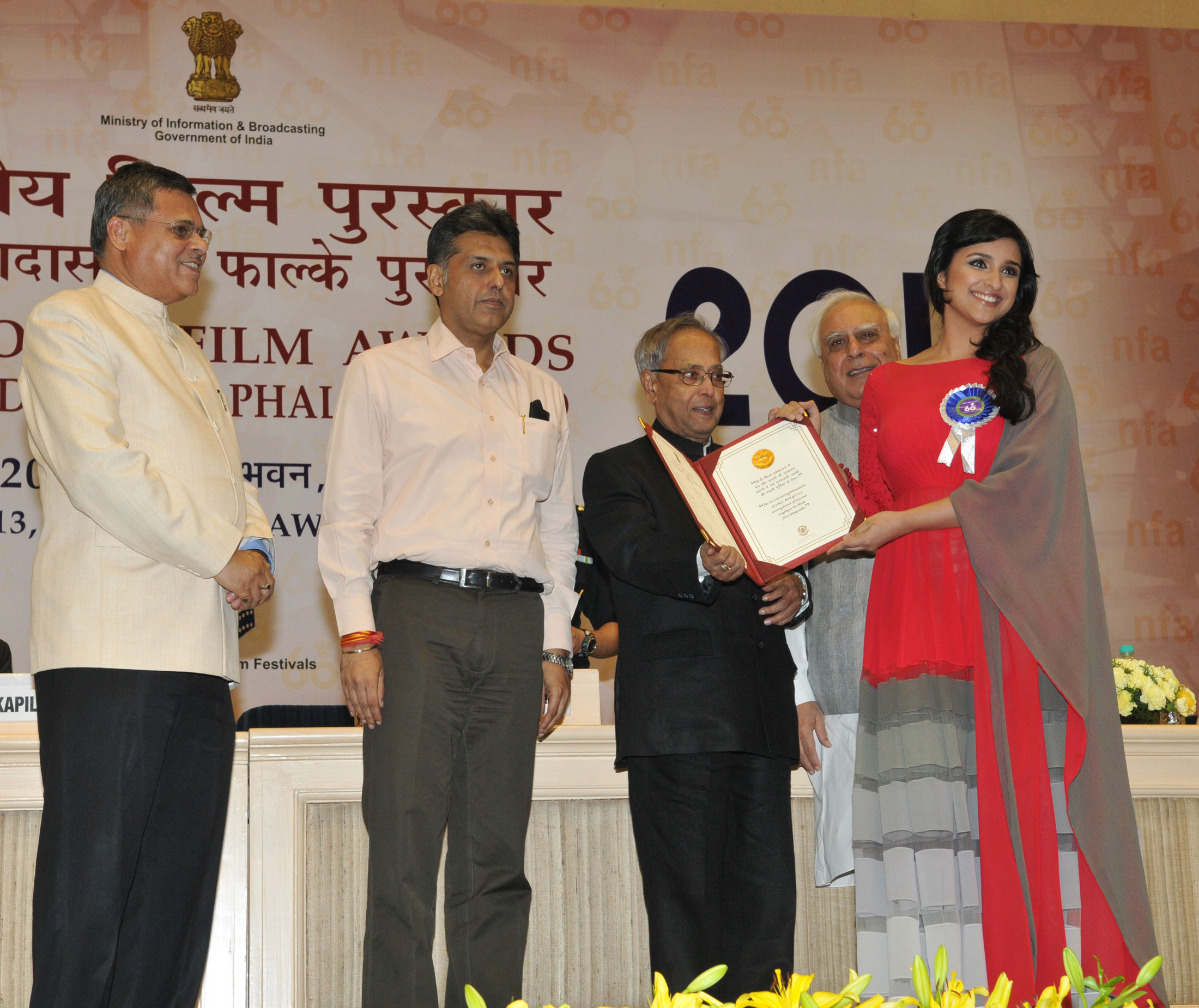
- Chopra receiving National Film Award – Special Mention at the 60th National Film Awards in 2013
Awards and nominations
Award	Wins	Nominations
National Film Awards	1	1
Filmfare Awards	1	5
International Indian Film Academy Awards	2	2
BIG Star Entertainment Awards	1	6
People's Choice Awards India	1	2
Screen Awards	1	7
Stardust Awards	4	8
Zee Cine Awards	1	3
FICCI Frames Excellence Honours	1	1
Producers Guild Film Awards	2	5
Indian Television Academy Awards	0	1
Gold Awards	0	1
Mirchi Music Awards	0	1
Others	11	17

Totals (Note: Certain award groups do not simply award one winner. They acknowledge several different recipients, have runners-up, and have third place. Since this is a specific recognition and is different from losing an award, runner-up mentions are considered wins in this award tally. For simplification and to avoid errors, each award in this list has been presumed to have had a prior nomination.)
- Wins: 28
- Nominations: 63

Parineeti Chopra is an Indian actress who appears in Hindi films. Chopra has 28 awards to her credit including a National Film Award, one each from the Filmfare, Screen and Zee Cine Awards, and two awards each from the Producers Guild and International Indian Film Academy Awards (IIFA).

Chopra made her film debut with a supporting role in the 2011 romantic comedy Ladies vs Ricky Bahl, which won her the Best Female Debut at the 57th Filmfare Awards. She also received Best Debut awards at other ceremonies, including Screen Awards, IIFA Awards, Producers Guild Film Awards, and Zee Cine Awards. Additionally, Chopra won the IIFA Award for Best Supporting Actress, and the Producers Guild Film Award for Best Actress in a Supporting Role, and was nominated in the same category at the Filmfare, Screen, and Zee Cine award ceremonies for her performance in the film. In 2012, she played her first lead role in the action romantic drama Ishaqzaade, for which she earned a Special Mention at the 60th National Film Awards. For the film, Chopra also received her first nomination for the Filmfare Award and Producers Guild Film Award for Best Actress in a Leading Role, among other honours.

In 2013, she starred in the romantic comedy-drama Shuddh Desi Romance, for which she received her first nomination for the Zee Cine Award for Best Actor – Female, and her second Best Actress nomination at Filmfare, Screen and Producers Guild award ceremonies. For her portrayal of a mad scientist in the 2014 romantic comedy-drama Hasee Toh Phasee, Chopra received her third nomination for the Screen Award for Best Actress, and won the BIG Star Entertainment Award for Most Entertaining Actress in a Comedy Film. The same year, she was also nominated for the Stardust Award for Best Actress in a Comedy or Romance for her performance in the social comedy Daawat–e–Ishq. She won the Stardust Award for Star of the Year – Female for her performance in Kill Dil. Chopra made her singing debut in 2017 with Meri Pyaari Bindu's acclaimed song Maana Ke Hum Yaar Nahin, receiving praise for her voice and a nomination at 10th Mirchi Music Awards for Upcoming Female Vocalist of The Year.

In 2022, Chopra for her performance in Sandeep Aur Pinky Faraar, received nomination for Best Actress in a Leading Role at 7th FOI Online Awards and her third Best Actress nomination at Filmfare awards. In addition to this, she has been awarded Vogue Beauty Awards, Youth Icon Of The Year and Gr8 Women Awards for her Contribution to Cinema. In 2023, she received British Council’s India UK Achievers Honours for Outstanding Achiever in the category of Arts, Entertainment & Culture.

== BIG Star Entertainment Awards ==
The BIG Star Entertainment Awards is an annual event organised by the Reliance Broadcast Network. Chopra has received one award from six nominations.

Year	Work	Category	Result	Ref.
2012	Ishaqzaade	Most Entertaining Actor in a Romantic Role – Female	Nominated	
2013	Shuddh Desi Romance	Most Entertaining Actor in a Romantic Role – Female	Nominated	
2013	Shuddh Desi Romance	Most Entertaining Film Actor – Female	Nominated	
2013	Shuddh Desi Romance	Most Entertaining Actor in a Comedy Film – Female	Nominated	
2014	Hasee Toh Phasee	Most Entertaining Actor in a Comedy Film – Female	Won	
2014	Hasee Toh Phasee	Most Entertaining Actor in a Romantic Film – Female	Nominated	

== Bollywood Hungama OTT India Fest ==
The Bollywood Hungama OTT India Fest Awards are annual awards that honor that recognize artistic and technical excellence in Hindi-language original programming within the OTT space. Chopra has received two nomination.

Year	Work	Category	Result	Ref.
2024	Best Actor Female – Original Film	Amar Singh Chamkila	Nominated	
2024	Best Actor Female (Popular) – Original Film	Amar Singh Chamkila	Nominated	

== FICCI Frames Excellence Honours ==
The FICCI Frames Excellence Honours is an annual award ceremony organised by the Federation of Indian Chambers of Commerce and Industry. Chopra has won one award.

Year	Work	Category	Result	Ref.
2012	Ladies vs Ricky Bahl	Best Female Debut	Won	

== Filmfare Awards ==
The Filmfare Awards are presented annually by The Times Group for excellence of cinematic achievements in Hindi cinema. Chopra has received one award from five nominations.

Year	Work	Category	Result	Ref.
2011	Ladies vs Ricky Bahl	Best Female Debut	Won	
2011	Ladies vs Ricky Bahl	Best Supporting Actress	Nominated	
2012	Ishaqzaade	Best Actress	Nominated	
2013	Shuddh Desi Romance	Best Actress	Nominated	
2022	Sandeep Aur Pinky Faraar	Best Actress	Nominated	

== Filmfare OTT Awards ==
The Filmfare Awards are annual awards that honour artistic and technical excellence in the Hindi-language original programming over-the-top (OTT) space. Chopra has received one nomination.

Year	Work	Category	Result	Ref.
2024	Amar Singh Chamkila	Best Actor in a Web Original Film – Female	Nominated	

== Gold Awards ==
Gold Awards is an annual international event organised by Vikaas Kalantri and Zee TV to honour excellence in the Hindi television and cinema. Chopra has one nomination at the Gold Awards.

Year	Work	Category	Result	Ref.
2023	The Girl on the Train	Best Actress in a Leading Role – OTT	Nominated	

== International Indian Film Academy Awards ==
The International Indian Film Academy Awards (shortened as IIFA) is an annual international event organised by the Wizcraft International Entertainment Pvt. Ltd. to honour excellence in the Hindi cinema. Chopra has won both nominations.

Year	Work	Category	Result	Ref.
2012	Ladies vs Ricky Bahl	Best Female Debut	Won	
2012	Ladies vs Ricky Bahl	Best Supporting Actress	Won	

== IIFA Digital Awards ==
The IIFA Digital Awards is an annual international event organised by the Wizcraft International Entertainment Pvt. Ltd. to honour excellence in the web films and series. It was started on the occasion of 25th yearof IIFA. Chopra has received one nominations.

Year	Work	Category	Result	Ref.
2025	Amar Singh Chamkila	Best Actress – Film	Nominated	

== Indian Streaming Academy Awards ==
The Indian Streaming Academy Awards is an annual event organised to honour excellence in the web series across all major Indian languages.

Year	Work	Category	Result	Ref.
2025	Amar Singh Chamkila	Best Actress – Popular (Film)	Won	

== Indian Television Academy Awards ==
The Indian Television Academy Awards (shortened as ITA) is an annual award ceremony organised by the Indian Television Academy to honour excellence in Hindi-language television, films and web content. Chopra has received one nomination.

Year	Work	Category	Result	Ref.
2024	Amar Singh Chamkila	Best Actress in an Original Film	Nominated	

== Lions Gold Awards ==
The Lions Gold Awards are presented annually by members of the Lions Club of SOL-Mumbai to honour excellence in the Hindi cinema.. Chopra has won both the nominations.

Year	Work	Category	Result	Ref.
2014	Ishaqzaade	Favourite Promising Actress	Won	
2022	Sandeep Aur Pinky Faraar	Powerhouse Performer of The Year	Won	

== Mirchi Music Awards ==
Mirchi Music Awards are presented annually by Radio Mirchi to honour both artistic and technical excellence of Hindi films and music.

Year	Work	Category	Result	Ref.
2017	Maana Ke Hum Yaar Nahin (from the film Meri Pyaari Bindu)	Upcoming Female Vocalist of The Year	Nominated	

== National Film Awards ==
The National Film Awards is the most prestigious film award ceremony in India, considered to be the equivalent of the Academy Awards. Established in 1954, it is administered by the International Film Festival of India and the Indian government's Directorate of Film Festivals. The awards are presented by the President of India. Chopra has received one award.

Year	Work	Category	Result	Ref.
2012	Ishaqzaade	Special Mention	Won	

== People's Choice Awards India ==
The People's Choice Awards India is the Indian version of the American awards show recognising Indian film, television, music and sports. Chopra has received one award from two nominations.

Year	Work	Category	Result	Ref.
2012	Ladies vs Ricky Bahl and Ishaqzaade	Favorite Debut Actor	Won	
2012	Ishaqzaade	Favorite Movie Actress	Nominated	

== Producers Guild Film Awards ==
The Producers Guild Film Awards (previously known as Apsara Film & Television Producers Guild Awards) is an annual event organised by the Film Producers Guild of India. Chopra has won two awards from five nominations.

Year	Work	Category	Result	Ref.
2012	Ladies vs Ricky Bahl	Best Female Debut	Won	
2012	Ladies vs Ricky Bahl	Best Actress in a Supporting Role	Won	
2013	Ishaqzaade	Best Actress in a Leading Role	Nominated	
2014	Shuddh Desi Romance	Best Actress in a Leading Role	Nominated	
2015	Hasee Toh Phasee	Best Actor in a Comic Role	Nominated	

== Screen Awards ==
The Screen Awards are annually presented by the Indian Express Limited to honour excellence of cinematic achievements in Hindi and Marathi cinema. Chopra has received one award from seven nominations.

Year	Work	Category	Result	Ref.
2012	Ladies vs Ricky Bahl	Most Promising Newcomer – Female	Won	
2012	Ladies vs Ricky Bahl	Best Supporting Actress	Nominated	
2013	Ishaqzaade	Best Actress	Nominated	
2014	Shuddh Desi Romance	Best Actress	Nominated	
2014	Shuddh Desi Romance	Best Actress (Popular Choice)	Nominated	
2015	Hasee Toh Phasee	Best Actress (Popular Choice)	Nominated	
2015	Hasee Toh Phasee	Best Actress	Nominated	
2017	Meri Pyaari Bindu	Best Female Playback Singer (for "Maana Ke Hum Yaar Nahin")	Nominated	

== Stardust Awards ==
The Stardust Awards are an annual event organised by Magna Publishing Company Limited to honour excellence in the Hindi cinema. Chopra has won four awards from eight nominations.

Year	Work	Category	Result	Ref.
2012	Ladies vs Ricky Bahl	Superstar of Tomorrow – Female	Won	
2013	Ishaqzaade	Superstar of Tomorrow – Female	Won	
2014	Hasee Toh Phasee	Star of the Year – Female	Nominated	
2014	Hasee Toh Phasee	Best Actress – Comedy or Romance	Nominated	
2014	Daawat–e–Ishq	Best Actress – Comedy or Romance	Nominated	
2014	Daawat–e–Ishq	Star of the Year – Female	Nominated	
2014	Kill Dil	Star of the Year – Female	Won	
2015	—N/a	Style Icon of The Year	Won	

== Times of India Film Awards ==
The Times of India Film Awards (also known as TOIFA Awards) are presented by The Times of India to honour both artistic and technical excellence of professionals in the Hindi language film industry of India. Chopra has won one award.

Year	Work	Category	Result	Ref.
2025	Amar Singh Chamkila	Acting Excellence Female – Web Film	Won	

== Zee Cine Awards ==
The Zee Cine Awards are an annual award ceremony organised by the Zee Entertainment Enterprises. Chopra has received one award from three nominations.

Year	Work	Category	Result	Ref.
2012	Ladies vs Ricky Bahl	Best Female Debut	Won	
2012	Ladies vs Ricky Bahl	Best Actor in a Supporting Role – Female	Nominated	
2014	Shuddh Desi Romance	Best Actor – Female	Nominated	

== Other awards ==
Year	Award / Organisation	Category	Result	Ref.
2014	Vogue Beauty Awards	Flawless Face	Won	
2015	Gr8 Women Awards	Contribution to Cinema	Won	
2015	Arab Indo Bollywood Awards	Arab Youth Icon (Female)	Won	
2016	Vogue Beauty Awards	Inspirational Icon Award	Won	
2016	HT India's Most Stylish Awards	HT Most Stylish Youth Icon (Female)	Won	
2017	HT India's Most Stylish Awards	Youth Icon Of The Year (Female)	Won	
2018	HT India's Most Stylish Awards	Style Gamechanger (Female)	Won	
2022	Pinkvilla Style Icons Awards	Super Stylish Mould –Breaker (Female)	Won	
2023	India UK Achievers Honours	Outstanding Achiever (Arts, Entertainment & Culture)	Won	
2024	Bollywood Hungama Style Icons	Most Stylish Power-Packed Performer of the Year - Female	Nominated	
2024	Bollywood Hungama Style Icons	Most Stylish Versatile Talent of the Year	Nominated	

== Media recognitions ==
Year	Organisation	Recognition	Result	Ref.
2011	Verve	Most Powerful Women	Rank #4	
2012	The Times of India	Most Promising Newcomer	Rank #2	
2012	Rediff.com	Bollywood's Best Actresses	Rank #6	
2013	Eastern Eye	50 Sexiest Asian Women	Rank #14	
2013	The Times of India	50 Most Desirable Women	Rank #44	
2013	The Indian Express	Top 10 Bollywood Actresses	Rank #10	
2014	Rediff.com	Bollywood's Best Actresses	Rank #6	
2014	Google	Most Searched Celebrities	Rank #18	
2015	Eastern Eye	50 Sexiest Asian Women List	Rank #33	
2024	Rediff.com	Bollywood's Best Actresses	Rank #6	
2024	Firstpost	Best Performances on OTT	Rank #3	
