= Dum Laga Ke Haisha =

2015 Indian film by Sharat Katariya

- Theatrical release poster
- Directed by: Sharat Katariya
- Written by: Sharat Katariya
- Produced by: Maneesh Sharma
- Starring: Ayushmann Khurrana; Bhumi Pednekar
- Cinematography: Manu Anand
- Edited by: Namrata Rao
- Music by: Songs: Anu Malik; Score: Andrea Guerra
- Production company: Yash Raj Films
- Distributed by: Yash Raj Films
- Release date: 27 February 2015 (India)
- Running time: 110 minutes
- Country: India
- Language: Hindi
- Budget: ₹14 crore (US$1.5 million)

Dum Laga Ke Haisha (transl. Give it all your force), released internationally as My Big Fat Bride, is a 2015 Indian Hindi-language romantic comedy-drama film written and directed by Sharat Katariya and produced by Maneesh Sharma in his production debut under Yash Raj Films, with chairman and norm producer Aditya Chopra serving as presenter. The film stars Ayushmann Khurrana and debutante Bhumi Pednekar in the lead roles and follows Prem and Sandhya, a reluctantly newlywed couple in Haridwar who navigate their marital frictions as they overcome their differences.

Dum Laga Ke Haisha marked Khurrana's second collaboration with Yash Raj Films and Pednekar's debut following her stint as an assistant casting director with the company. Manu Anand and Namrata Rao, who had worked with Sharma on Shuddh Desi Romance, respectively served as cinematographer and editor. The film's soundtrack was composed by Anu Malik in his first outing with the studio, with Italian composer Andrea Guerra composing the background score.

Dum Laga Ke Haisha was released on 27 February 2015 to positive reviews from critics and was a commercial success. According to Box Office India, the film collected ₹42 crore (US$4.4 million) domestically after a five-week run. The film celebrated 50 days of its theatrical run on 16 April 2015. The film's final worldwide gross was ₹71.85 crore (US$7.5 million). It received five nominations at the 61st Filmfare Awards, winning two, Best Female Debut for Pednekar and Best Cinematography for Anand. The song "Moh Moh Ke Dhaage" received three nominations for its lyrics by Varun Grover and vocals by Papon and Monali Thakur. The film also won three National Film Awards: Best Hindi Film, Best Lyrics (Grover for "Moh Moh Ke Dhaage") and Best Female Playback Singer (Thakur for "Moh Moh Ke Dhaage").

== Plot ==
In 1995, Prem Prakash Tiwari is a young owner of a video cassette shop in the local market of Haridwar, who subscribes to a nationalist organisation. One of the key values of the organisation is abstinence, although senior members are married and there are no restrictions on the marriage of junior members. However, it is expected that their members should not indulge in their married life at the expense of service to the nation. His father is keen on getting him married to an educated overweight girl Sandhya. In spite of not liking her, the school drop out Prem agrees to marry her. In addition, as Sandhya is trying to be a school teacher, his family asks him to think of this alliance for financial help too. Eventually, in an elaborate community-wedding ceremony, Prem and Sandhya get married.

Prem visibly shows his disinterest in the marriage and does not consummate the marriage on the wedding night. At home, Sandhya tries to get Prem attracted to her. But he is too embarrassed to even walk with her on the street. Prem and Sandhya's relationship remains strained although they share a kiss and have sex on their second night together. The branch manager advises him that since he could not uphold his oath of abstinence he should rather focus on his married life. Over time, Sandhya's frustration shows; when Prem's aunt brings up a petty topic, the two have a heated exchange of words and she tells them how he does not treat her well.

Amidst all this a close friend of Prem, Nirmal gets married. Prem and Sandhya go for the ceremony where due to his excessive drinking and jealousy over Nirmal's pretty wife, he tells everyone that sleeping with Sandhya feels like hell. Sandhya hears this and slaps him in front of his friends and he slaps her back. The following morning, Sandhya reflects on what she's been through, feels she has had enough and decides to leave Prem. Meanwhile, Prem decides to channel his energy into studying and to take his English paper again; he enrolls for the examination. His friends give up on him; after a verbal squabble, they throw him out of the group. He studies sincerely for the exam, but at the time of his exam, he is overwhelmed by the emotional turmoil and is not able to write a word. Ultimately he plainly writes an emotional message to the person checking his paper that if at all he feels any pity for his state he should not award him with a zero or else his family would be reduced to zero (indicating his suicide attempt).

Soon, Nirmal's father opens a shop selling music CDs in the same market, clearly affecting Prem's family business. Prem's family talks to Nirmal's family and the discussion ends with Nirmal challenging him to participate and win the "Dum Lagao" contest, which entails him carrying his wife on his shoulders and running an obstacle course. Meanwhile, Sandhya and Prem reach the court to file for divorce. Prem's father pleads the judge that divorce should not happen on petty issues and his family is more than happy to take her home, Sandhya's parents too feel the same and support him. The court decides that the two must spend six months with each other and try to salvage their marriage. Both decide to live together just as a formality, but they soon begin to get on, as they both start understanding each other. Meanwhile, Sandhya is coerced into the contest. They start getting close with each passing day, but according to Prem, they lack co-ordination and are a total mismatch.

One day as Prem returns home, he is disgusted to see that his family members are pretending Sandhya's terrible culinary skills. He finally snaps and expresses his anguish over this pretense, and attempts suicide. A police constable arrives at their home, owing to a complaint regarding the emotional letter (attempt to suicide) he had written in his English exam. Sandhya is moved by this, and they have a deep conversation with each other. Sandhya gets a teaching job in Meerut, which she gladly accepts since she feels that there is no one who cares about her anymore. When she tells Prem about it, he cannot come to terms with losing her and realises that he is in love with her.

On the day of competition, Prem's aunt successfully convinces him to participate in the competition and the couple takes a last chance to save their marriage. Surprisingly, Prem shoulders the weight of his wife and surges past all other contestants. In the last lap, Sandhya confesses to Prem that she does not want to go to Meerut and wants Prem to let her stay. Prem knows winning this competition is the only way to do this and pushes himself further to eventually win the race.

Prem does not let Sandhya get off his back even after the race is over. He takes her back all the way to his house where they seal their love with a kiss.

== Cast ==
- Ayushmann Khurrana as Prem Prakash Tiwari
- Bhumi Pednekar as Sandhya Tiwari (née Verma)
- Sanjay Mishra as Chandra Prakash Tiwari
- Alka Amin as Sashi Tiwari
- Sheeba Chaddha as Nain Tara
- Seema Pahwa as Subhadra Rani
- Shardul Rana as Samar Verma
- Shrikant Verma as Shakha Babu
- Poorva Neeraj as Sandhya's divorce lawyer
- Kunal S Malla as Bade Jijaji
- Sonali Sharma Anand as Hema
- Chandrachoor Rai as Nirmal
- Mahesh Sharma as Vijay
- Jahidul Islam Shuvo as Shuvo
- V K Sharma as Raghuveer Nautiyal
- Kumar Sanu as Himself (special appearance)

== Production ==
Dum Laga Ke Haisha was the first Yash Raj Films production to not be produced by Aditya Chopra; he instead served as a presenter and onboarded director Maneesh Sharma, who had helmed three of his previous productions, namely Band Baaja Baaraat (2010), Ladies vs Ricky Bahl (2011) and Shuddh Desi Romance (2013) to produce the project. Writer and director Sharat Katariya had sent the script, which was written in 2007, almost seven years before release, to Yash Raj Films; Chopra sought to launch Sharma as a producer for new age avant-garde projects for the company, and they selected Katariya's script for the endeavour.

Filming took place in Haridwar and Rishikesh, making it the first Hindi film to be entirely shot in the twin temple towns. Bhumi Pednekar was selected for the female lead, marking her debut as an actor; while Ayushmann Khurrana had previously appeared in Chopra-produced Bewakoofiyaan (2014) a year before, Pednekar was an assistant casting director for the company before she was launched. The role required her to be overweight; she subsequently gained 30 kg to land the role.

== Release ==
The censor board muted the word "lesbian" and replaced four words in the film. The film had a platform release in India, opening on 775 screens. The film released in UAE on 23 April 2015. As of 20 March 2015, this film has not been released in North America or Europe.

== Soundtrack ==
The soundtrack for Dum Laga Ke Haisha is composed by Anu Malik in his maiden collaboration with Yash Raj Films, with lyrics by Varun Grover. The first soundtrack to not feature lead actor Ayushmann Khurrana as a singer, it marked the playback singing comeback of Sadhana Sargam, while Kumar Sanu sang two songs on the album, including the duet with Sargam. Among other vocalists are Papon, Bishal Phukan, Kailash Kher, sisters Jyoti and Sultana Nooran, Malini Awasthi, Rahul Ram and Monali Thakur.

The song "Moh Moh Ke Dhaage", sung by Thakur and Papon in different versions, was arranged by Hitesh Modak. The song earned Thakur the National Film Award for Best Female Playback Singer and Grover the National Film Award for Best Lyrics.

== Reception ==
=== Critical response ===
Hindustan Times stated that while "[y]ou know from the onset that the guy will get his girl", the film "bucks stereotypes in many, many ways". Bollywood Hungama praised the performances but criticised the direction and editing. Koimoi gave the film 4 out of 5 stars, praising the script and cast performances, but criticising Katariya's direction. Shubhra Gupta of the Indian Express gave the film 3.5 out of 5 stars. Rajeev Masand of CNN-IBN gave the film 3.5 out of 5 stars. NDTV gave the film 3.5 out of 5 stars. Anuj Kumar of The Hindu praised the film as a "well-rounded effort".

=== Box office ===
Dum Laga Ke Haisha grossed ₹30 crore domestically and was declared a "Hit" by Box Office India.

== Awards and nominations ==
Award	Category	Recipient(s)	Result
63rd National Film Awards	Best Feature Film in Hindi	Sharat Katariya, Maneesh Sharma and Yash Raj Films	Won
63rd National Film Awards	Best Female Playback Singer	Monali Thakur (for the song "Moh Moh Ke Dhaage")	Won
63rd National Film Awards	Best Lyrics	Varun Grover (for the song "Moh Moh Ke Dhaage")	Won
11th Star Guild Awards	Best Music Director	Anu Malik	Nominated
11th Star Guild Awards	Best Lyrics	Varun Grover (for the song "Moh Moh Ke Dhaage")	Won
11th Star Guild Awards	Best Playback Singer – Female	Monali Thakur (for the song "Moh Moh Ke Dhaage")	Won
11th Star Guild Awards	Best Female Debut	Bhumi Pednekar	Won
11th Star Guild Awards	Best Actor in a Comic Role	Sanjay Mishra	Nominated
11th Star Guild Awards	Best Actor in a Supporting Role	Sanjay Mishra	Nominated
61st Filmfare Awards	Best Female Debut	Bhumi Pednekar	Won
61st Filmfare Awards	Best Cinematography	Manu Anand	Won
61st Filmfare Awards	Best Lyricist	Varun Grover (for the song "Moh Moh Ke Dhaage")	Nominated
61st Filmfare Awards	Best Male Playback Singer	Papon (for the song "Moh Moh Ke Dhaage")	Nominated
61st Filmfare Awards	Best Female Playback Singer	Monali Thakur (for the song "Moh Moh Ke Dhaage")	Nominated
22nd Screen Awards	Best Male Playback	Papon (for the song "Moh Moh Ke Dhaage")	Won
22nd Screen Awards	Best Female Playback	Monali Thakur (for the song "Moh Moh Ke Dhaage")	Won
22nd Screen Awards	Best Female Debut	Bhumi Pednekar	Won
2016 Zee Cine Awards	Best Lyricist	Varun Grover (for the song "Moh Moh Ke Dhaage")	Won
2016 Zee Cine Awards	Best Actor in a Comic Role	Sanjay Mishra	Nominated
2016 Zee Cine Awards	Best Music Director	Anu Malik	Won
2016 Zee Cine Awards	Best Playback Singer – Male	Papon (for the song "Moh Moh Ke Dhaage")	Nominated
2016 Zee Cine Awards	Best Playback Singer – Female	Monali Thakur (for the song "Moh Moh Ke Dhaage")	Nominated
2016 Zee Cine Awards	Best Female Debut	Bhumi Pednekar	Won
2016 Zee Cine Awards	Best Cinematography	Manu Anand	Nominated
2016 Zee Cine Awards	Best Director	Sharat Katariya	Nominated
2016 Stardust Awards	Editors Film of the Year	Aditya Chopra, Maneesh Sharma	Won
2016 Stardust Awards	Best Debut (Female)	Bhumi Pednekar	Won
17th IIFA Awards	Best Female Debut	Bhumi Pednekar	Won
17th IIFA Awards	Best Lyricist	Varun Grover (for the song "Moh Moh Ke Dhaage")	Won
17th IIFA Awards	Best Female Playback Singer	Monali Thakur (for the song "Moh Moh Ke Dhaage")	Won
17th IIFA Awards	Best Male Playback Singer	Papon (for the song "Moh Moh Ke Dhaage")	Won
6th GiMA Awards	Best Male Playback Singer	Papon (for the song "Moh Moh Ke Dhaage")	Won
6th GiMA Awards	Best Lyricist	Varun Grover (for the song "Moh Moh Ke Dhaage")	Won
6th GiMA Awards	Best Female Playback Singer	Monali Thakur (for the song "Moh Moh Ke Dhaage")	Nominated
6th GiMA Awards	Best Film Song	"Moh Moh Ke Dhaage"	Nominated
8th Mirchi Music Awards	Best Lyrics	Varun Grover (for the song "Moh Moh Ke Dhaage")	Won
8th Mirchi Music Awards	Best Playback Singer – Female	Monali Thakur (for the song "Moh Moh Ke Dhaage")	Nominated
8th Mirchi Music Awards	Best Playback Singer – Male	Papon (for the song "Moh Moh Ke Dhaage")	Won
