= Habib Faisal =

Indian writer and director

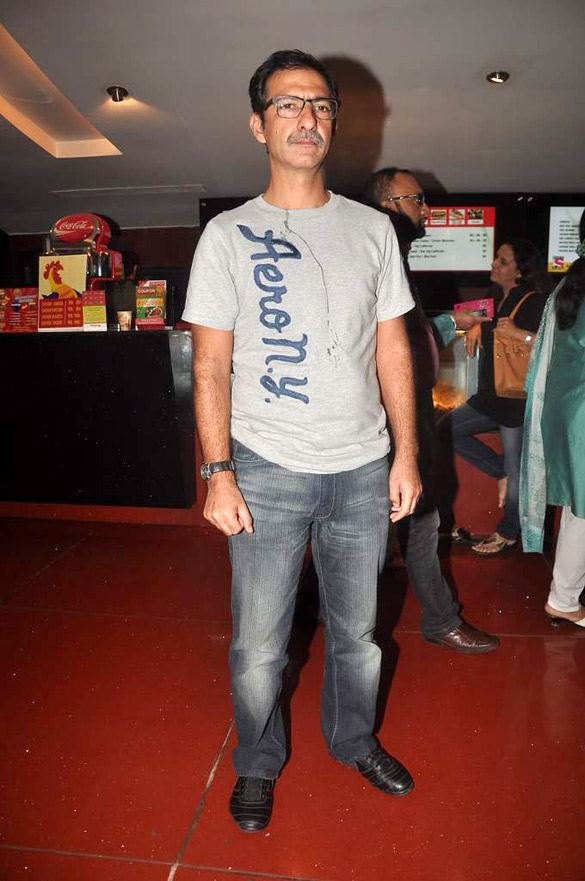
- Habib in 2012
- Born: Bhopal, Madhya Pradesh, India
- Education: Jamia Millia Islamia
- Occupations: Film director; screenwriter; lyricist
- Years active: 1992–present

Habib Faisal is an Indian filmmaker and lyricist best known for his work in Hindi films. He was written and directed films such as Salaam Namaste (2005), Ta Ra Rum Pum (2007), Band Baaja Baaraat (2010), Ladies vs Ricky Bahl (2011), Ishaqzaade (2012), Bewakoofiyaan (2014), and Fan (2016).

== Career ==
Fasial has written several films under the Yash Raj Films banner including Siddharth Anand's Salaam Namaste (2005), Shaad Ali's Jhoom Barabar Jhoom (2007), and Anand's Ta Ra Rum Pum (2007). In 2010, he wrote Maneesh Sharma's Band Baaja Baaraat, and made his directorial debut with the film Do Dooni Chaar for which he won the Filmfare Award for Best Dialogue. The following year, he co-wrote the crime comedy Ladies vs Ricky Bahl alongside Devika Bhagat.

Faisal's second film, Ishaqzaade starring debutant Arjun Kapoor, and Parineeti Chopra, was released on 11 May 2012. The film received positive reviews from critics, and was a box-office hit. He wrote the comedy Bewakoofiyaan (2014), directed by Nupur Asthana which starred Ayushmann Khurrana, Sonam Kapoor, and Rishi Kapoor. His next directorial venture was the comedy-drama Daawat-e-Ishq (2014) starring Aditya Roy Kapur and Parineeti Chopra in lead roles. Faisal's fourth film, Qaidi Band was released in 2017.

An alumnus of Jamia Millia Islamia, he has directed the television serial kareena kareena and worked in New Delhi as a cameraman for NDTV.

== Discography ==
Year	Title	Artist	Album
2012	"Chokra Jawaan"	Amit Trivedi	Ishaqzaade
2017	"Jag Mag" (with Peter Muxka Manuel)	Amit Trivedi	Qaidi Band
2017	"I am India"	Amit Trivedi	Qaidi Band

== Filmography ==
Year	Title	Screenwriter	Director	Notes
2005	Salaam Namaste	Yes	No	Additional screenplay
2007	Ta Ra Rum Pum	Yes	No	
2007	Jhoom Barabar Jhoom	Yes	No	
2010	Do Dooni Chaar	Yes	Yes	
2010	Band Baaja Baaraat	Yes	No	
2011	Ladies vs Ricky Bahl	Yes	No	
2012	Ishaqzaade	Yes	Yes	
2014	Bewakoofiyaan	Yes	No	
2014	Daawat-e-Ishq	Yes	Yes	
2016	Fan	Yes	No	
2017	Qaidi Band	Yes	Yes	
2018	Home	No	Yes	
2018	Raju Gadu	Yes	No	Telugu film
2020	Aashram	Yes	No	
2021	Dil Bekaraar	No	Yes	

== Awards and nominations ==
Year	Award	Category	Title	Result	Ref.
2010	Filmfare Awards	Best Dialogue	Band Baaja Baaraat	Won	
2010	Screen Awards	Best Dialogue	Band Baaja Baaraat	Won	
2010	National Film Awards	Best Hindi Feature Film	Do Dooni Chaar	Won	
2012	Mirchi Music Awards	Upcoming Lyricist of The Year	"Chokra Jawaan" from Ishaqzaade	Nominated	
2021	Filmfare OTT Awards	Best Original Story (Series)	Aashram	Nominated	
