= Shamshera =

2022 Indian film by Karan Malhotra

- Theatrical release poster
- Directed by: Karan Malhotra
- Screenplay by: Ekta Pathak Malhotra; Karan Malhotra
- Dialogues by: Piyush Mishra
- Story by: Neelesh Misra; Khila Bisht
- Produced by: Aditya Chopra
- Starring: Ranbir Kapoor; Sanjay Dutt; Vaani Kapoor
- Cinematography: Anay Goswamy
- Edited by: Shivkumar V. Panicker
- Music by: Mithoon
- Production company: Yash Raj Films
- Distributed by: Yash Raj Films
- Release date: 22 July 2022 (India)
- Running time: 159 minutes
- Country: India
- Language: Hindi
- Budget: ₹150 crore
- Box office: ₹63.58 crore

Shamshera is a 2022 Indian Hindi-language period action drama film directed by Karan Malhotra and produced by Aditya Chopra. The film stars Ranbir Kapoor in a dual role, alongside Sanjay Dutt, Vaani Kapoor, Ronit Roy, and Saurabh Shukla. It follows the captivity of an oppressed warrior tribe during the British Raj.

Shamshera was released on 22 July 2022, and received mixed-to-negative reviews with criticism towards the story, screenplay, direction, and soundtrack, although Kapoor's and Dutt's performances were praised. It emerged as a box-office disaster.

== Plot ==
1896: Balli is a tribesman from the Khameran tribe, who aspires to become a policeman. He is asked to provide a test to a conniving Indian police officer named Shudh Singh. Shudh Singh asks him to beat a child to prove his worth, but Balli refuses and takes the child's place and bears the punishment. That night, Balli learns about his father Shamshera's past.

1871: Shamshera is a Khameran tribesman, who along with his people was oppressed by the people of Kaza because of caste and status discrimination. Due to this, Shamshera counterattacks and pillages the kingdom, which leads to Kaza creating a hatred against the Khamerans. The King and the wealthy men of the empire seek the help of the British to drive away the Khameran tribe from their village forest. The British accept the deal in exchange for 5000 gold coins.

The British attack the Khameran tribe, but Shamshera and the tribal people fight valiantly and the British flee. Shamshera receives a message that their tribe could live peacefully and have their respect if they promised to stop plundering Kaza and move to a fortress outside the city premises. Shamshera and his men arrive at the fortress where they realize that it is a trap led by Shudh Singh. They are captured and are tortured mercilessly. Shamshera is told by the British to provide 10,000 gold coins, in exchange for sparing the Khameran tribe.

Realizing that the deal would be difficult to achieve inside the fortress. Shamshera forms a plan to help the tribe escape from the fortress, but to no avail. Then he tells his wife about his plan to frame himself as a traitor and tells her to cook-up a story to save the tribe from getting killed. Shamshera tries to escape by climbing the wall of the fortress where the officer-in-charge spots Shamshera and shoots him, leaving Shamshera wounded and later getting hanged by Shudh Singh. Believing that Shamshera is a traitor, the tribe develops a hatred against him, thus leaving the truth to be buried.

1896: When Shamshera decided to move to the fortress, a few Khamerans decided to stay back. They are now residing in a town named Nagina, and have camouflaged their identities, doing all petty jobs in the town for a living and they were waiting for Shamshera, as he would come and help them regain their lost respect and dignity. Balli fakes his death and escapes from the fortress with the help of Shamshera's trusted ally Pir Baba. As advised by Pir Baba, and with the help of a local dancer named Sona, Balli starts looting the rich people of Kaza and refers himself as Shamshera. The British General is worried about the new Shamshera.

Shudh Singh invites the General for his wedding, where the General deduces that Shamshera would come to the wedding. Balli is able to steal the gold from Shudh Singh's wedding, but his youngest gang member is shot by the sadistic cop. With the information given by a gang member of Balli, Shudh Singh conducts a crackdown and confiscates all the gold that the gang had stolen. Sona, who is pregnant with Balli's child, is caught by Shudh Singh, and he attempts to kill her and Balli's child, but the General stops him.

Though heartbroken, Balli plans to steal the Queen's Crown, which is supposed to arrive at Kaza. Despite tight security, Balli steals the Queen's crown and puts a blot on the British General's reputation. Balli makes a deal with the General to free the Khamerans, in exchange for the Queen's Crown. The General agrees and Balli returns with the surviving members of his crew to the Kaza Fortress. Shudh Singh kills the British forces, and places the blame on Balli, and takes the credit for returning the crown to the queen, but forgets about placing the blame on Khamerans.

The Khamerans learn about Shamshera's sacrifice from Pir Baba, where they get enraged and breaks the fortress's gates to fight alongside Balli. They slaughter the police force. Balli fights Shudh Singh, and he hangs Shudh Singh in the same way, in which he hanged Shamshera. Balli leaves the Queen's Crown to the British General, due to him having saved Sona's life. The Khamerans ride alongside Balli, and are hopeful that they will be able to live a dignified life hereafter.

== Cast ==
- Ranbir Kapoor in a dual role as
  - Shamshera
  - Balli, Shamshera's son
- Sanjay Dutt as Daroga Shudh Singh
- Vaani Kapoor as Sona, Balli's wife
- Saurabh Shukla as Doodh Singh
- Ronit Roy as Pir Baba
- Iravati Harshe as Shamshera's wife and Balli's mother
- Craig McGinlay as Colonel Freddy Young
- Saurabh Kumar as Chooha
- Chitrak Bandhopadyay as Raasho
- Mahesh Balraj as Upreti
- Rudra Soni as Pitamber
- Prakhar Saxena as Bhura
- Nagesh Salvan as Dada
- Vijay Kaushik as Gulfi
- Gauransh Sharma as Keshu

== Production ==
=== Development ===
The original story for Shamshera was created by Khila Bisht, a college friend of Neelesh Misra who co-wrote it. Shamshera officially launched in May 2018 by Yash Raj Films through a motion poster, revealing Ranbir Kapoor as the titular character Shamshera. The film marked Kapoor's comeback to films, following Sanju (2018).

=== Casting ===
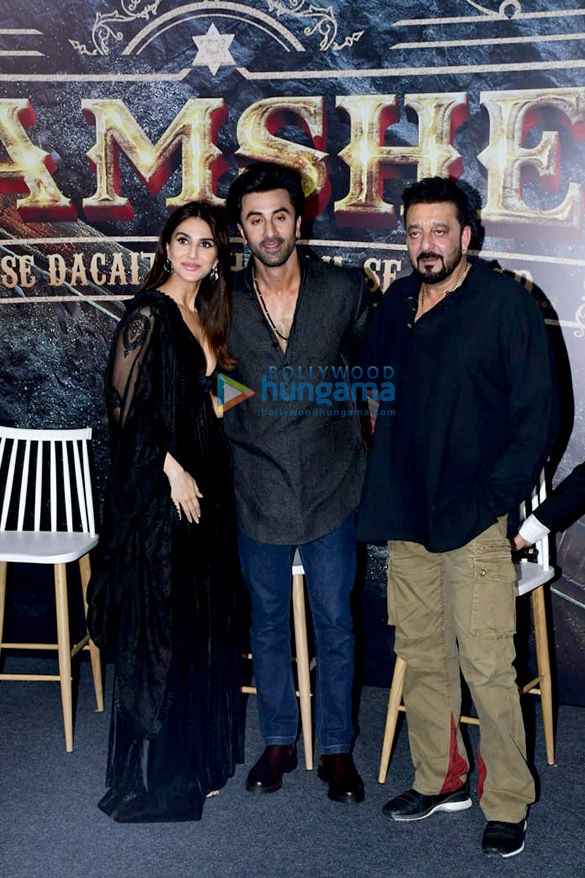
Vaani Kapoor, Ranbir Kapoor and Sanjay Dutt at the trailer launch (from left)

Sanjay Dutt was cast in a pivotal role, and Vaani Kapoor was signed to play the female lead. To prepare her role, Vaani Kapoor took professional training in Kathak. Kapoor portrays a dancer.

=== Filming ===
Principal photography commenced in December 2018 and concluded in September 2020. For the film, a massive fort was built at Film City, Goregaon, requiring 2 months of preparation and the effort of nearly 300 workers.

== Music ==
Shamshera

Soundtrack album by Mithoon
- Released: 22 June 2022
- Recorded: 2021
- Studio: YRF Studios
- Genre: Feature film soundtrack
- Length: Hindi version: 30:18; Tamil and Telugu version: 30:20
- Label: YRF Music
- Producer: Mithoon

Mithoon chronology
HIT: The First Case (2022)	Shamshera (2022)	Ek Villain Returns (2022)

Shamshera's soundtrack consists of seven songs composed by Mithoon, with lyrics written by Mithoon, Karan Malhotra and Piyush Mishra.

Hindi
No.	Title	Lyrics	Singer(s)	Length
1.	"Ji Huzoor"	Mithoon	Aditya Narayan, Shadaab Faridi	4:09
2.	"Fitoor"	Karan Malhotra	Arijit Singh, Neeti Mohan, Sudeep Jaipurwale	5:08
3.	"Kaale Naina"	Mithoon, Traditional	Shadaab Faridi, Neeti Mohan, Sudesh Bhosle	5:24
4.	"Shamshera" (Title Track)	Mithoon	Sukhwinder Singh, Abhishek Nailwal	5:32
5.	"Hunkara"	Piyush Mishra	Sukhwinder Singh, Richa Sharma, Mithoon	5:08
6.	"Parinda"	Karan Malhotra	Sukhwinder Singh, Abhishek Nailwal	4:57
Total length:				30:18

All lyrics are written by Madhan Karky.

Tamil
No.	Title	Singer(s)	Length
1.	"Aethukkoa"	Shadaab Faridi	4:09
2.	"Ondraagudhae"	Yazin Nizar, Neeti Mohan	5:08
3.	"Kannale"	Neeti Mohan, Yazin Nizar, Sudesh Bhosle	5:26
4.	"Shamshera Thoandrumboadhu"	Abhishek Nailwal, Yazin Nizar	5:32
5.	"Singam"	Chaganti Sahithi, Sukhwinder Singh, Abhishek Nailwal	5:08
6.	"Theeporiyae"	Abhishek Nailwal, Yazin Nizar	4:57
Total length:			30:20

All lyrics are written by Chaitanya Prasad.

Telugu
No.	Title	Singer(s)	Length
1.	"Ji Huzoor"	Shadaab Faridi	4:09
2.	"Nee Paina Picchi Preme Kadhaa"	Yazin Nizar, Neeti Mohan	5:08
3.	"Aame Kallu"	Neeti Mohan, Yazin Nizar, Sudesh Bhosle	5:26
4.	"Shamshera" (Title Track)	Sukhwinder Singh, Abhishek Nailwal	5:32
5.	"Chamak Chamak Sithara"	Chaganti Sahithi, Sukhwinder Singh, Abhishek Nailwal	5:08
6.	"Malli Egirev Gaa"	Sukhwinder Singh, Abhishek Nailwal	4:57
Total length:			30:20

== Release ==
=== Theatrical ===
Shamshera released theatrically on 22 July 2022. Originally scheduled for a theatrical release on 31 July, it was delayed due to the COVID-19 pandemic. It was then rescheduled to 25 June 2021. Due to the second wave of the pandemic, the release was postponed to 18 March 2022, then was again delayed due to the Omicron variant spreading at the time. It released on 22 July 2022. The film was released in Hindi, Tamil and Telugu and in IMAX theatres.

=== Home media ===
The digital streaming rights of the film were acquired by Amazon Prime Video. The film began streaming on Prime Video from 19 August 2022 in Hindi and dubbed versions in Tamil and Telugu.

== Controversy ==
The film faced online controversy at the time of its theatrical release, by some right-wing Hindu nationalists, for portraying the primary antagonist - portrayed by Sanjay Dutt - as an orthodox upper-caste Hindu, labelling it as anti-Hindu. It was further subjected to a lawsuit for plagiarism by Bikramjeet Singh Bhullar who alleged that the film was based on his story Kabu na chhadein khet; this delayed the release of the film on OTT platforms. The Delhi High Court allowed its release online in the interim to enable Yash Raj Films to fulfill its prior contractual obligations.

== Reception ==
=== Box office ===
Shamshera earned ₹10.25 crore at the domestic box office on its opening day. On the second day, the film collected ₹10.50 crore. On the third day, the film collected ₹11 crore, taking a total domestic opening weekend of ₹31.75 crore.

As of 11 August 2022, the film grossed ₹50.57 crore (US$5.3 million) in India and ₹13.01 crore (US$1.4 million) overseas, for a worldwide gross collection of ₹63.58 crore (US$6.6 million).

=== Critical response ===
Shamshera received mixed to negative reviews from critics. On the review aggregator website Rotten Tomatoes, 25% of 8 critics' reviews are positive, with an average rating of 4/10.

Anna M. M. Vetticad of Firstpost rated the film 3.5 out of 5 stars and wrote, "Ranbir is gorgeous in every imaginable way in Shamshera in terms of his acting, sex appeal, dancing, litheness in the action scenes and magnetic personality." Tina Das of The Print rated the film 3.5 out of 5 stars and wrote, "While RRR relies heavily on VFX, Ranbir Kapoor's Shamshera affects the heart and feels more realistic with its new caste angle and Vaani Kapoor's acting." Avinash Lohana of Pinkvilla rated the film 3 out of 5 stars and wrote, "Karan Malhotra's Shamshera starring Ranbir Kapoor, Vaani Kapoor and Sanjay Dutt is in line with the ongoing trend of workable films, and has the right amount of drama, action, romance, humour and all other masala potboiler elements to entertain the audience." Mugdha Kapoor of DNA India rated the film 3 out of 5 stars and wrote, "Ranbir Kapoor shines in the double role, and the film marks the perfect comeback for the actor." A critic for Filmfare rated the film 3 out of 5 stars and wrote, "The South film industry has been making such films for the last few years, and Shamshera is Bollywood's bold attempt at replicating the formula. The Hindi film industry needs a renaissance and let's hope this film becomes a catalyst towards it."

Rachana Dubey of The Times of India rated the film 2.5 out of 5 stars and wrote, "To sum it up, director and co-writer Karan Malhotra surely seemed to have had a grand vision at the onset, but it's his execution that seems to have betrayed him." Sonil Dedhia of News 18 rated the film 2.5 out of 5 stars and wrote, "Shamshera doesn't really have the punch or the thrill that is required to pull off a film of this scale. The film feels a little too long, blame it on weak editing." Shalini Langer of The Indian Express rated the film 2.5 out of 5 stars and wrote, "Ranbir Kapoor is efficiently good as Shamshera, a leader of a tribe first treated as outcastes and later betrayed and kept enslaved in a fort." Tushar Joshi of India Today rated the film 2 out of 5 stars and wrote, "Shamshera is a mess that needs more than just star power to come to its rescue." Sukanya Verma of Rediff rated the film 2 out of 5 stars and wrote, "Shamshera's problem is a shocking inability to support its bombastic ideas with gripping drama. The result is the wastage of not one but two Ranbir Kapoors." Taran Adarsh rated the film 1.5 out of 5 stars, called the film an 'epic disappointment' and wrote, "Even Ranbir Kapoor's star-power cannot save this ship from sinking." Saibal Chatterjee of NDTV rated the film 1 out of 5 stars and wrote, "Moral of the story for Ranbir Kapoor - the actor should henceforth read his scripts with a more critical eye before buying into them. He owes it to his talent."

Undertaking a critical comparison between Shamshera and the "pan-India" films from South India releasing at the time, Arkadev Ghoshal of South First wrote that Shamshera had good characters, and good actors playing them, but "neither Pir (played by Ronit Roy) nor Doodh Singh (played by Saurabh Shukla) became audience-favourites like Kattappa from the Baahubali films."
