= Maneesh Sharma =

Indian filmmaker (born 1978)

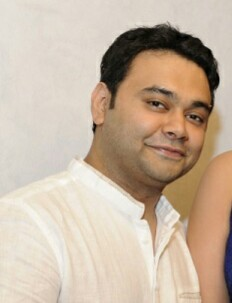
- Sharma in 2013
- Born: 6 January 1978 (age 48); Delhi, India
- Education: Master of Fine Arts (MFA)
- Alma mater: Hansraj College (DU); California Institute of the Arts
- Occupations: Film director; film producer; screenwriter
- Years active: 2004–present

Maneesh Sharma (born 6 January 1978) is an Indian filmmaker who is known for his work in Hindi films. He has directed films such as Band Baaja Baaraat (2010), Ladies vs Ricky Bahl (2011), Shuddh Desi Romance (2013), Fan (2016) and Tiger 3 (2023).

== Early life and education ==
Sharma was born and raised in Delhi, India, where he lived in various parts of the city, including Pitam Pura. He completed his schooling at Delhi Public School, R K Puram. He graduated with a bachelor's degree in English literature from Hansraj College. At college, he was involved in the theatre society. After his graduation, he moved to California to study filmmaking at the California Institute of the Arts.

== Career ==
While studying filmmaking in California, Maneesh worked as an associate director for the film Trona in 2004, an English-German student film shot in Los Angeles.

After returning to India, he began working as an assistant director for Yash Raj Films productions such as Fanaa (2006), Aaja Nachle (2007) and Rab Ne Bana Di Jodi (2008), before making his directorial debut with Band Baaja Baaraat (2010), based on a story written by himself. The film starred newcomer Ranveer Singh and Anushka Sharma in the lead roles, and was produced by Aditya Chopra under the Yash Raj Films banner. The film earned him the Filmfare Award for Best Debut Director.

His next film, Ladies vs Ricky Bahl (2011), starred Ranveer Singh and Anushka Sharma, who were also the leads of Sharma's first film. Sharma's third film, Shuddh Desi Romance (2013), starred Sushant Singh Rajput, Parineeti Chopra, and newcomer Vaani Kapoor in the lead roles. The film was screened in the Gala Presentation section of the 2013 Toronto International Film Festival.

In 2015, Sharma produced Dum Laga Ke Haisha under the Yash Raj Films banner. It was directed by Sharat Katariya, and starred Ayushmann Khurrana and Bhumi Pednekar. In 2016, he directed Fan starring Shah Rukh Khan, which received mixed reviews from critics was a box office failure. Sharma's second production venture Meri Pyaari Bindu (2017), which was directed by Akshay Roy and starred Parineeti Chopra and Ayushmann Khurrana. In 2023, Sharma directed the YRF Spy Universe film Tiger 3 starring Salman Khan, Katrina Kaif and Emraan Hashmi.

== Filmography ==
Year	Title	Director	Screenwriter	Producer	Notes
2006	Fanaa	Assistant	No	No	
2007	Aaja Nachle	Associate	No	No	
2008	Rab Ne Bana Di Jodi	Associate	No	No	
2010	Band Baaja Baaraat	Yes	Story	No	
2011	Ladies vs Ricky Bahl	Yes	No	No	
2013	Shuddh Desi Romance	Yes	No	No	
2015	Dum Laga Ke Haisha	No	No	Yes	
2016	Fan	Yes	Story	No	
2017	Meri Pyaari Bindu	No	No	Yes	
2018	Hichki	No	No	Yes	
2018	Sui Dhaaga	No	No	Yes	
2022	Jayeshbhai Jordaar	No	No	Yes	
2023	Tiger 3	Yes	No	No	
2024	Vijay 69	No	No	Yes	

Other credits

Year	Title	Credit	Notes
2023	The Romantics	Himself	Documentary series

== Awards and nominations ==
Year	Award	Category	Nominated work	Result	Ref.
2011	Filmfare Awards	Best Director	Band Baaja Baaraat	Nominated	
2011	Filmfare Awards	Best Debut Director	Band Baaja Baaraat	Won	
2011	IIFA Awards	Best Director	Band Baaja Baaraat	Nominated	
2011	IIFA Awards	Best Story	Band Baaja Baaraat	Nominated	
2016	National Film Awards	Best Feature Film in Hindi	Dum Laga Ke Haisha	Won	
