= Parineeti Chopra =

Indian actress (born 1988)

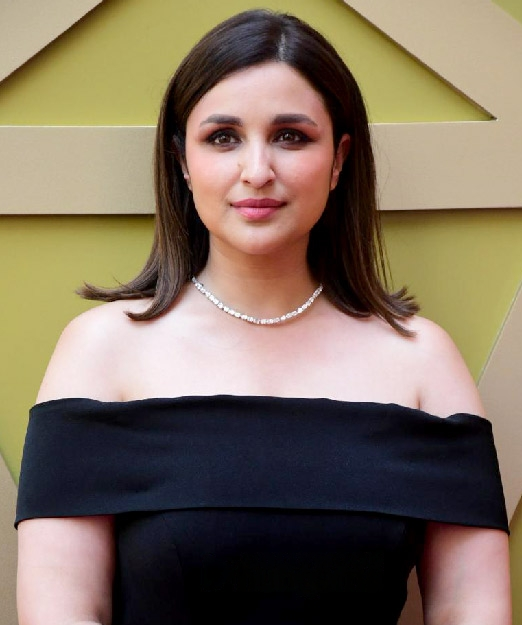
- Chopra in 2025
- Born: 22 October 1988 (age 38); Ambala, Haryana, India
- Education: University of Manchester
- Occupation: Actress
- Years active: 2011–present
- Works: Full list
- Spouse: Raghav Chadha (m. 2023)
- Children: 1
- Relatives: Chopra family
- Awards: Full list

Parineeti Chopra (pronounced [pəriːniːt̪iː ˈtʃoːpɽaː]; born 22 October 1988) is an Indian actress who primarily works in Hindi films. Chopra has received several accolades, including a Filmfare and a National Film Award. Chopra has appeared in Forbes India's Celebrity 100 list since 2013.

After obtaining a triple honours degree in business, finance and economics from Manchester Business School, Chopra made her acting debut with the 2011 romantic comedy Ladies vs Ricky Bahl, winning the Filmfare Award for Best Female Debut. She followed it by garnering acclaim for her starring roles in the box-office hits Ishaqzaade (2012), Shuddh Desi Romance (2013) and Hasee Toh Phasee (2014). The first of these won her the National Film Award – Special Mention. This success was followed by a three-year hiatus and several poorly received films, with the exception of the horror-comedy Golmaal Again (2017) and the war drama Kesari (2019), in which she had a brief role. Chopra has since earned praise for her roles in the black comedy Sandeep Aur Pinky Faraar (2021) and the biographical drama Amar Singh Chamkila (2024), and had a supporting role in the ensemble film Uunchai (2022).

In addition to her acting career, Chopra is a prominent celebrity endorser for brands and products. She has sung some of her film songs, including "Maana Ke Hum Yaar Nahin" and "Teri Mitti". In 2022, Chopra ventured into television by judging the reality show Hunarbaaz: Desh Ki Shaan on Colors TV. Chopra is married to politician Raghav Chadha with whom she has a son.

== Early life and work ==
Chopra was born on 22 October 1988 in Ambala, Haryana, into a Punjabi Hindu family. Her father, Pawan Chopra, is a businessman and supplier to the Indian Army at Ambala Cantonment, and her mother is Reena Chopra. She has two brothers, Shivang and Sahaj. Actresses Priyanka Chopra, Meera Chopra and Mannara Chopra are her cousins.

Chopra was educated at Convent of Jesus and Mary, Ambala. She later moved to England at the age of 17 and obtained a triple honours degree in business, finance and economics from Alliance Manchester Business School. During her studies, she worked part-time for Manchester United F.C. as a team leader in the catering department. She is also a trained Hindustani classical singer and holds a degree in music.

In 2009, Chopra returned to India during the Great Recession and moved to Mumbai. She joined Yash Raj Films as an intern in the marketing department and later worked as a public relations consultant. While working on promotions for Band Baaja Baaraat (2010), she decided to pursue acting. After a screen test, she was signed by producer Aditya Chopra to a three-film contract with Yash Raj Films.

== Acting career ==
=== Breakthrough and acclaimed success (2011–2014) ===
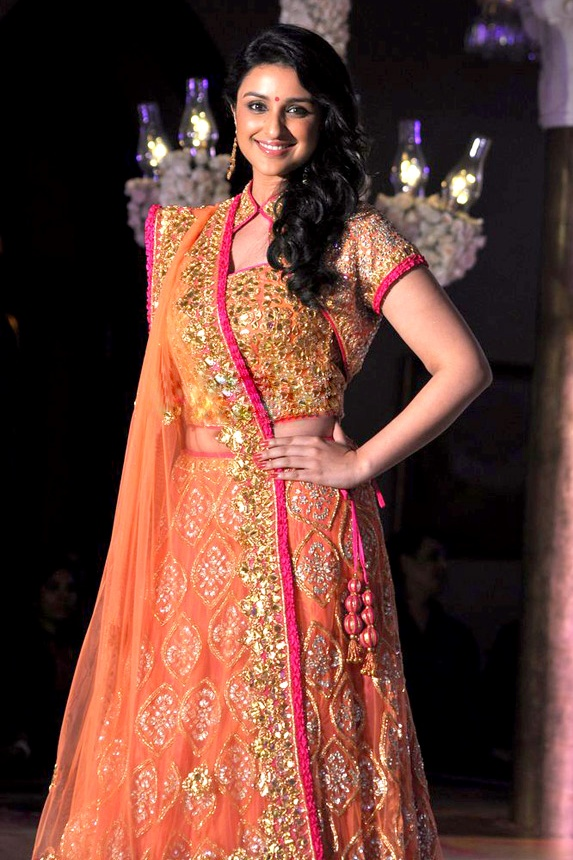
Chopra in 2012

In 2011, Chopra made her screen debut in a supporting role in debutant Maneesh Sharma's romantic comedy Ladies vs Ricky Bahl starring Ranveer Singh and Anushka Sharma in lead roles. Chopra played the Delhi-based "rich and spoiled brat" Dimple Chadda. The film emerged as a moderate commercial success at the box-office, and received mixed reviews from critics; however, Chopra's performance received high praise. Komal Nahta said, "Of the three other girls, Chopra is undoubtedly the best. She has the best role, the best lines and hers is the best performance among the three." Priyanka Roy of The Telegraph described Chopra as "natural" and wrote "Among the ladies, debutante Chopra almost steals the show from Sharma." It earned her several Best Debut awards at various award ceremonies including Filmfare, Screen, IIFA Producers Guild Film Awards. Chopra also received Best Supporting Actress nominations at several ceremonies, including Filmfare, and won the Producers Guild and IIFA Awards in the same category.

Chopra's second release was Habib Faisal's action romantic drama Ishaqzaade in which she played a leading role as Zoya, opposite debutant Arjun Kapoor. The film emerged as a commercial success at the box-office, and received positive reviews from critics, with Chopra's performance receiving critical acclaim. Taran Adarsh observed, "Chopra is simply fantastic [...] Playing the part of a spirited gun-toting girl, she is not the regular timid, decorous, withdrawn Hindi film heroine. She portrays the violent behavior coupled with the audacious and brash attitude with aplomb", and Rajeev Masand labelled her the "biggest strength of the film". The film grossed over ₹46 crore (US$4.9 million) at the domestic box-office, and was termed a "super hit" by Box Office India. Chopra's performance earned her the National Film Award – Special Mention at the 60th National Film Awards, and her first nominations for the Producers Guild, Screen and Filmfare Award for Best Actress.

Chopra next starred alongside Sushant Singh Rajput and Vaani Kapoor in the romantic comedy-drama Shuddh Desi Romance (2013), her second collaboration with Maneesh Sharma. It received positive reviews from critics, with Chopra's portrayal of Gayatri, an outspoken and rebellious girl, received high critical acclaim. CNN-IBN noted that the film belonged to Chopra, who "turns Gayatri into the most real woman one have encountered on screen", and the critic Mayank Shekhar added "Chopra's act in the film's first half is nothing short of National Film Award-winning material." Shuddh Desi Romance emerged as a commercial success at the box-office, grossing ₹46 crore (US$4.9 million) domestically. Chopra garnered several Best Actress nominations, including a second consecutive nomination for the Filmfare Award for Best Actress.

Chopra's first of three releases of 2014 was Dharma Productions' romantic comedy-drama Hasee Toh Phasee, her first role outside the Yash Raj Films banner. She portrayed Dr. Meeta Solanki, a mad scientist on the run, opposite Sidharth Malhotra. Directed by Vinil Mathew and jointly produced by Anurag Kashyap and Karan Johar, the film emerged as a commercial success at the box-office, and received positive reviews from critics, with Chopra's performance receiving widespread critical acclaim. Saibal Chatterjee of NDTV wrote that Chopra was "pitch-perfect with her goofball act" and Hindustan Times published that she re-defined the concept of a Bollywood heroine with the film. For her performance in the film, she won the BIG Star Entertainment Award for Most Entertaining Actor in a Comedy Film and received Best Actress nomination at Screen and Stardust Awards.

Habib Faisal's dowry-based social comedy film Daawat-e-Ishq marked Chopra's second collaboration with Faisal. She was cast as Gulrez "Gullu" Qadir, a middle-class salesgirl from Hyderabad alongside Aditya Roy Kapur and Anupam Kher. The film received mixed reviews from critics upon release, though Chopra's performance received praise. Film critic Sarita A. Tanwar from Daily News Analysis found Chopra to be "the best thing about the film" and added, "Chopra shines in every scene. She does what she does every single time — rises head and shoulders above the film and her costars." Chopra next played her first "glamorous role" in Shaad Ali's crime film Kill Dil, co-starring Govinda, Singh and Ali Zafar. Sukanya Verma of Rediff.com found the film to be a "disaster" and wrote that "Chopra is terribly miscast and wears clothes that should have never left the wardrobe". Both Daawat-e-Ishq and Kill Dil were unsuccessful at the box office. The same year, she also appeared in the short film, Dor as Ria.

=== Hiatus and career fluctuations (2015–2020) ===
Post the release of Kill Dil, Chopra took a 3-year sabbatical from full-time acting, during which she briefly portrayed guest character Muskaan Raza Qureshi in Dishoom (2016), appearing in the song "Jaaneman Aah" alongside Varun Dhawan. She returned to the screen in 2017 with Yash Raj Films' romantic drama Meri Pyaari Bindu opposite Ayushmann Khurrana. Anisha Jhaveri of IndieWire praised Chopra for "grounding Bindu with flickers of genuine sensitivity and vulnerability [...] hinting that there's more to the character behind that flighty surface." Rajeev Masand called her performance as "sincere", but felt that the actress was given very less to work thanks to the "flighty and fickle" nature of her character. She next starred opposite Ajay Devgn in Rohit Shetty's horror-comedy Golmaal Again, the fourth installment in the Golmaal film series. Bollywood Hungama noted, "Chopra has a crucial character and from the first sequence itself, there's an element of mystery surrounding her character that adds to the fun. She looks beautiful and does a good job." The film broke several box-office records and was eventually declared a blockbuster, thus becoming her highest-grossing film to date. It grossed over ₹311 crore (US$33 million) at the box-office, thus becoming one of the highest-grossing Indian films of all time.

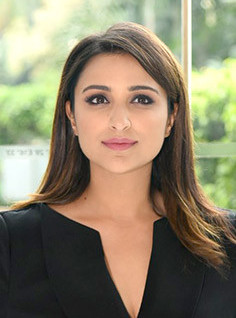
Chopra promoting Golmaal Again in 2017

Chopra's only release of 2018 was a reunion with Arjun Kapoor after Ishaqzaade on Vipul Amrutlal Shah's romantic comedy Namaste England, a sequel to Shah's Namastey London (2007) which starred Akshay Kumar and Katrina Kaif. The film emerged as a critical and commercial disaster at the box-office. Shilpa Jamkhandikar of Reuters felt she was "sleepwalking through a role that didn't have too much meat in the first place" and Nandini Ramnath of Scroll noted that her usual spikiness was missing.

Chopra's first film appearance of in 2019 was in a brief role opposite Kumar in the historical war drama Kesari directed by Anurag Singh. Sukanya Verma of Rediff.com felt that she had "precious little to do" in the film. However, Rachit Gupta of The Times of India noted her "small, but impactful role", writing "it's her character's fun banter with Kumar that puts a smile on your face and her tears break your heart." The film emerged as a major commercial success at the box-office, grossing over ₹201 crore (US$21 million) worldwide. Her second release of the year was the action romantic comedy Jabariya Jodi, which was based upon the tradition of groom kidnapping, prevalent in Bihar. The film marked Chopra's second collaboration with Malhotra after Hasee Toh Phasee, and film received unanimously negative reviews and emerged as a commercial failure at the box-office. Writing for NDTV, film critic Saibal Chatterjee felt that Chopra "punctuates her perky, no-nonsense girl persona with moments of demure docility" but "all the effort that she makes to traverse the gamut quickly ceases to convey any meaning in the absence of cohesion and clarity in the character's motives." Shubhra Gupta of The Indian Express wrote that "Chopra, togged out in the most outlandish clothes Patna may have been witness too, seems to have gotten stuck in a rut of familiarity."

=== Renewed critical recognition and commercial setback (2021–present) ===
Chopra's first on-screen appearance of 2021 was in The Girl on the Train, a Hindi adaptation of the novel of the same name by Paula Hawkins; it was released on Netflix. The film was directed by Ribhu Dasgupta featuring Chopra as an alcoholic and troubled divorcee who gets embroiled in a murder investigation. A negative review in Firstpost criticised the film for "lacklustre writing" but praised her performance as "sincere", adding, "She manages to embed herself in Mira's tortured mind, giving this film its one selling point." Chopra next starred opposite Arjun Kapoor in Dibakar Banerjee's black comedy Sandeep Aur Pinky Faraar. Filmfare felt that the film belonged to Chopra, writing "She's the epicenter of the drama and has a multi-layered character that she plays around with. She swiftly moves from a strong unbreakable woman to a broken and vulnerable victim." Her performance in the film earned her a third nomination for the Filmfare Award for Best Actress. The biographical sports drama Saina was Chopra's final film of the year. Chopra portrayed the badminton player Saina Nehwal. Shubhra Gupta of The Indian Express noted that she serves drops and smashes as the badminton champ", writing Chopra gives us a good, solid Saina Nehwal. When she raises her racket after a hard-fought win, you cheer." Both Sandeep Aur Pinky Faraar and Saina were box-office bombs.

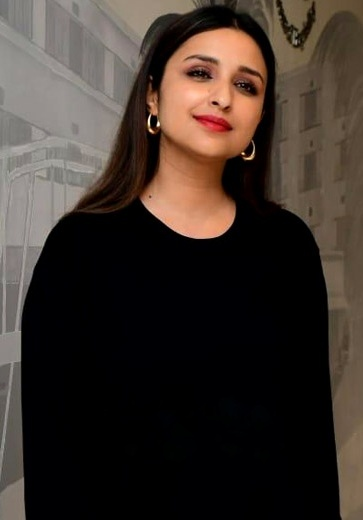
Chopra in 2022; promoting her film Code Name: Tiranga

Chopra's first film of 2022 was Dasgupta's espionage thriller Code Name: Tiranga, her second collaboration with the director. For her role, she learnt Krav Maga, an Israeli martial art developed for the Israel Defense Forces. It received negative reviews and emerged as a commercial failure at the box-office. Deepa Gahlot of Rediff.com wrote that Chopra "gets her fair share of the footage, but seems to equate scowling and squinting with seriousness of purpose." Chopra next featured as Shraddha Gupta, a tour guide, in the ensemble film Uunchai, directed by Sooraj Barjatya under Rajshri Productions. Anuj Kumar of The Hindu opined that she "gets a half-baked character, and yet, she makes the most of it". The following year in 2023, Chopra reunited with Akshay Kumar in the disaster film Mission Raniganj, based on the Raniganj Coalfields collapse of 1989. Dismissing her role in it, Nandini Ramnath opined that she "contributes little beyond the support expected of the spouse". It emerged as a commercial failure at the box-office.

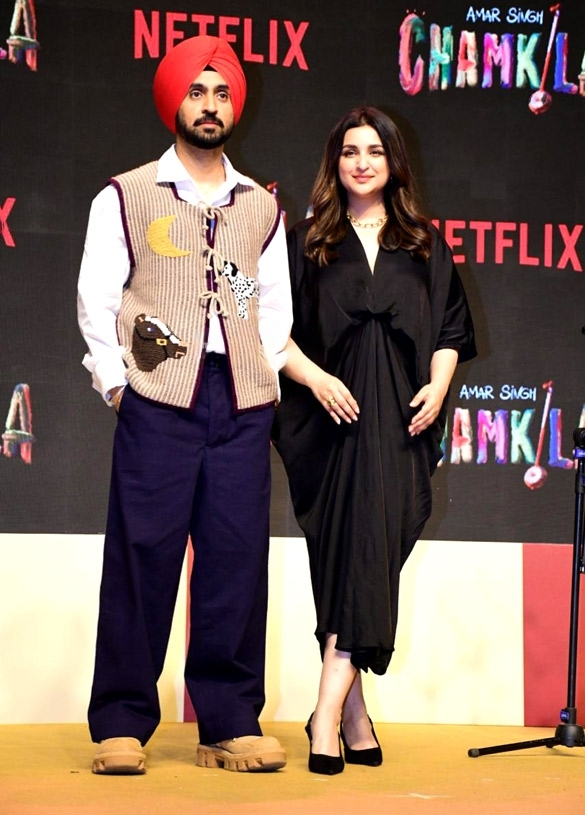
Chopra with Diljit Dosanjh at Amar Singh Chamkila's trailer launch

In her sole release of 2024, Chopra portrayed Amarjot Kaur, wife of Amar Singh Chamkila, opposite Diljit Dosanjh in the Imtiaz Ali directorial Amar Singh Chamkila. Chopra left Sandeep Reddy Vanga's Animal, to be a part of the project, due to schedule conflicts. Chopra stated, "It's one of the most exciting films that I've ever worked on." For her role in the film, Chopra gained 15 kilos. The film was released digitally on Netflix. In her review for WION, Shomini Sen found Chopra to be "beautifully restrained" as Amarjot and was appreciative of her chemistry with Dosanjh. The film eventually emerged as the most-watched Hindi streaming film of the year. Her performance earned her several awards and nominations including Filmfare OTT Award for Best Actor in a Web Original Film – Female nomination.

2026 saw Chopra expand to streaming series with Shaque: Trust No One, portraying Anvita opposite Tahir Raj Bhasin, a mother whose search for her abducted daughter stretches across nine years. For her role, Chopra relied on the writing and the real mothers around her on the set. She continued filming for the series while being pregnant with her child. Sana Farzeen noted, "Chopra successfully conveys her character's underlying grief during vulnerable moments, but her performance is otherwise dominated by a persistent, intense expression of anger." Following month, Chopra portrayed Sandhya, a journalist uncovering illegal sand–mining in her second release of the year, Reporting Live. Nandini Ramnath called it to be one of her recent "attentive performance" and found Chopra to be "solid". Despite mixed reviews, both the series and the film earned high viewership.

== Other ventures ==
=== Television ===
In 2014, Chopra made her first appearance on television in Zee TV's India's Best Cinestars Ki Khoj as a mentor. In 2015, she first did a cameo role of a doctor in the mini web-series Man's World. She then appeared as Mariama in the documentary Girl Rising India – Woh Padhegi, Woh Udegi, that premiered on Star Plus on the occasion of Raksha Bandhan. In addition to this, she has hosted the 3rd Stardust Awards with Ayushmann Khurana in 2013, the 11th Star Guild Awards with Kapil Sharma in 2015 and the second Times of India Film Awards with Riteish Deshmukh in 2016. She next appeared as a contestant on Star Plus's Lip Sing Battle along with Karan Johar in 2017. In 2018, she hosted the 63rd Filmfare Awards with Shah Rukh Khan, Johar and Khurana. Chopra made her television debut as a judge alongside Mithun Chakraborty and Johar on the reality show titled Hunarbaaz: Desh Ki Shaan, which premiered on Colors TV in 2022. She also appeared as a guest and contestant on Khatra Khatra Khatra, the same year.

=== Music and stage performances ===
Chopra made her playback singing debut in 2017 with the song "Maana Ke Hum Yaar Nahin" and received praise for her vocal performance and singing. Bollywood Hungama praised Chopra and wrote, "One has to admit that she does a really good job in rendering this one. The kind of thehrav that she brings with her singing is truly remarkable." The song earned her nominations for the Screen Award for Best Female Playback Singer and the Mirchi Music Award for Upcoming Female Vocalist of The Year. In 2019, Chopra recorded the female version of the song "Teri Mitti" for the film, Kesari, when the film entered "Rs 150 cr club". She sang the unplugged version of the song "Matlabi Yariyan" for the film The Girl on the Train in 2021.

She has performed on stage at the Filmfare, IIFA and Stardust award ceremonies. In August 2016, Chopra performed in various cities in the United States for the "Dream Team 2016" tour, alongside Johar, Varun Dhawan, Sidharth Malhotra, Aditya Roy Kapur, Katrina Kaif, Alia Bhatt and Badshah. According to Chopra, she felt "rejuvenated" post the Dream Team tour.

=== Philanthropy ===
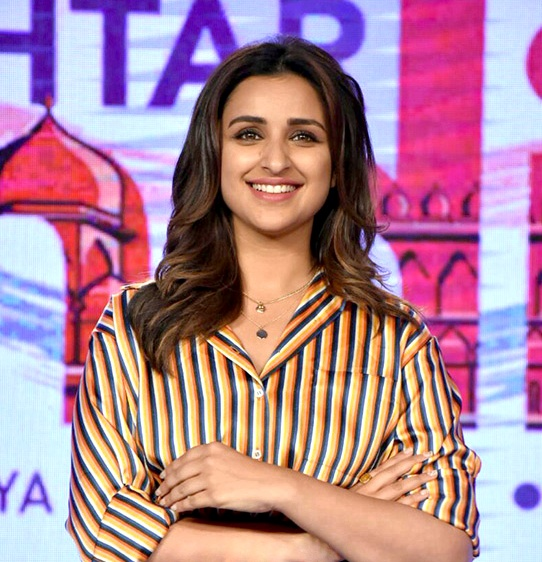
Chopra in 2018

In addition to acting in films, Chopra is active in charity work and supports a number of causes. She walked the ramp at the Wills Lifestyle India Fashion Week to support the Shabana Azmi Mijwan Welfare Society, a NGO dedicated to empowering girls. She also appeared on NDTV's Greenathon, an initiative to support eco-friendliness and investigate poor electricity supplies in rural villages, to lend her support. In 2013, she along with Urmila Matondkar, walked for Manish Malhotra in London, to support the Angeli Foundation – a charity that works to empower the Girl child in India. Chopra was appointed as the brand ambassador for the 'Beti Bachao-Beti Padhao' campaign to promote the cause of girl child by the Haryana government in 2015. In 2016, she was seen on the TV show Mission Sapne, where she helped 13-year-old Bhavna Suthalya secure a better future.

In 2017, Chopra became an ambassador for Tourism Australia in 'Friends of Australia' advocacy panel by Tourism Australia. According to the India Entertainment Marketing Report 2019, Indian visitors to Australia have grown at an average of 21 percent since the appointment of Chopra in comparison to 15 percent growth experienced during the prior six months. In 2020, Chopra did a virtual coffee date with people to raise funds that will feed 4,000 family members of 1,000 daily wage earners. Chopra is an aquaphile and was chosen as PADI's AmbassaDiver in May 2022. She has taken active part in cleaning the ocean during her scuba diving sessions. Chopra also cleaned Mumbai's beach post Ganpati visarjan in September 2022. She has also ramp walked in the Lakme Fashion Week and has been the cover model for several magazines. Chopra was conferred with "Master Scuba Diver" title in 2023.

=== Entrepreneurship ===
In July 2023, Chopra turned entrepreneur, and became an investor and partner in the beauty and cosmetic brand "Clensta". Expanding her entrepreneurial journey, in September that year, Chopra invested in "Tritiyaa Fine Jewellery", a venture founded by entrepreneur Kanthi Dutt.

== Artistry and reception ==
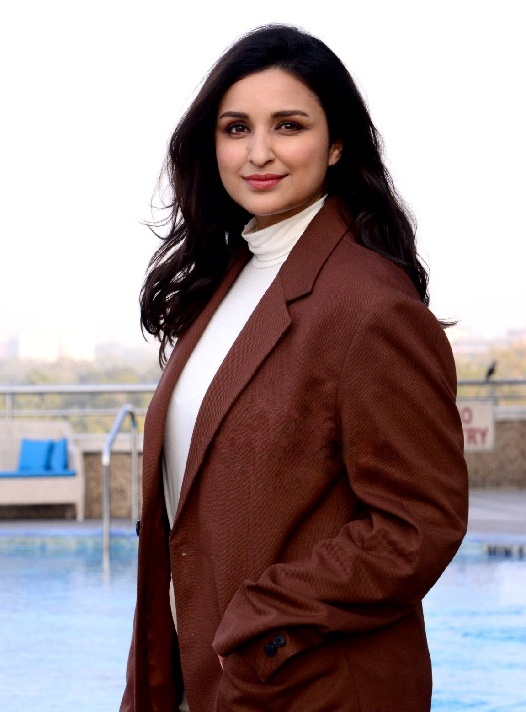
Chopra in 2022

Following her debut, Chopra was regarded as one of the most promising actresses in Hindi cinema. For her portrayal of brash, loud mouthed Dimple Chaddha in Ladies vs Ricky Bahl (2011), Rajeev Masand said that "she steals the film from under the nose of its leads". She was termed as Bollywood's "girl next door". She is noted for her acting versatility and range.

The actress' roles and performances have been studied by critics. NDTV noted, "[Chopra]....is as far removed from the standard Bollywood bombshell as it is possible for a lead actress to be. She's more girl next door than glamour doll, with no obvious oomph in evidence, and freely confesses to a battle with the weighing scale". The Indian Express labelled her the "most brightest and talented" newcomer of this generation, noting "her infectious amount of energy". While discussing her career in a 2013 article, CNN-IBN noted, "[she]....is one of the few actresses in the current lot who has a strong screen presence which demands absolute attention from the viewer. When she is on screen, one can't notice other actors—Parineeti engages you in such a way". Filmfare noted, "She's not only an actress with great screen presence, but also a loveable personality off screen....quite the complete package".

Writer Suhani Singh find Chopra to be animated, charming and fun woman who dreads the word "workout". She says Chopra has an "attractive and vivacious personality". Verve's Sitanshi Talati-Parikh termed her "gritty and hard-working to the extent of being tenacious" about her roles, her characters, her life. For her performance in Ishaqzaade (2012), film critic Rajeev Masand described her as "the biggest strength of the film". But with her earlier repetitive roles, he thought her "sheen was wearing off". Amit Tyagi of India Today feels Chopra has been "working towards changing woman characters' portrayal in Bollywood" one film at a time. While writing for Vogue, Anil Thakraney termed Chopra's "punctuality and respect for another person's time" as a rarity in the film world. Shrishti Negi of News 18 finds her to be the performer who has "always been good, always been multifaceted".

Her directors believe Chopra gets into the skin of her characters. Vinil Mathew had said, "Chopra is a clown and I wanted a character like her in my film. She is an extremely quirky actress". He further added that Chopra was always on his "wish list". Dibakar Banerjee found Chopra to be a "very strong-willed and combative individual who needs her own answers". He further said, "She taught me a lesson about ‘gameface' I'll never forget it and I used it in the film." Chopra says, "I never think, speak or act diplomatically." She further says she stays "focused on her character or a scene and enjoy being this new person". In an interview with Hindustan Times, Chopra revealed that she intends to do films where she has lot to perform, and not the films which has high production value. She said,

"I have been offered so many films and they might be great for an actor commercially, but my personal belief is to invest my time in projects that I will be proud of. I don't want to do a film that will get me money and has a huge star cast and a big director. I want to do films where I have a lot to do. I don't want to do a film in which I only get to dance or do a couple of songs. I really want meaty roles."

== Personal life ==
Chopra maintains a close relationship with her family. Despite being known for her media-friendly attitude, Chopra has been guarded about discussing her relationships. In 2019, Chopra spoke about her personal experience of battling depression. Chopra has been outspoken on issues such as weight gain and body-shaming. She said, "Body-shaming is the most ridiculous thing on earth. It is something natural and what you are born with. But every human being should strive to be their fittest. They shouldn't strive to be the skinniest. You can be fit at your body type." On being criticised for her weight, she said, "I agreed with them that I wasn't looking my best. I wasn't doing my best for my fitness. I think I would have gotten hurt if I was doing everything that I could and I was really my fittest, and then people didn't like the way I looked. I think that would have affected me. But I agreed with them because I knew I wasn't doing my best." Chopra also spoke on the pay gap in Bollywood. She said, "I always felt like I deserved a little bit more but I only got this much. But then girls do a lot of endorsements so we kind of make it up. So that is why I never talk about it (pay parity) because the boys don't do as many endorsements as girls. I hope I'm right. We do so many beauty commercials and hair commercials like so many brands and I think we kind of cover it up." Her statement was met by several criticism.

During her career's early stage, she was linked to director Maneesh Sharma, something which was later denied by the actress. Despite persistent rumours of dating politician and MP Raghav Chadha since March 2023, Chopra did not publicly speak about the relationship. They got engaged on 13 May 2023 at Kapurthala House in New Delhi. Chopra married Chadha on 24 September 2023 at The Leela Palace, Udaipur, Rajasthan in a traditional Hindu wedding ceremony. On 19 October 2025, she gave birth to their son, Neer.

== In the media ==
Chopra has appeared in Forbes India's Celebrity 100 list since 2013. She debuted at 77th position with an estimated annual income of ₹53.6 million (US$570,000). In 2019, with an estimated annual income of ₹125 million (US$1.3 million), she peaked at the 41st position. Chopra also has a large social media footprint, with over 44.1 million Instagram and 14.6 million Twitter followers.

The actress appeared on Verve's list of most powerful women in 2011. She was placed 2nd in Times of India's Most Promising Newcomer of 2011. In its 50 Most Desirable Women List, she debuted at 44th place in 2013. In 2012, 2014 and 2024, Rediff.com placed Chopra in their listing of the "Top Bollywood Actresses". She was placed in The Indian Express's Top 10 Bollywood Actresses of 2013 list. Chopra also appeared on the most searched celebrities list of 2014. In Eastern Eye's 50 Sexiest Asian Women List, she was placed 14th in 2013 and 33rd in 2015.

Apart from charity work, she serves as an ambassador for a number of brands. Chopra endorses brands such as Kurkure, Nivea, Maaza and Spinz, WeChat, Pantene, Vadilal and Mahindra scooty. She became the first Bollywood star to endorse products from both Coke (Maaza) and PepsiCo (Kurkure) at the same time. Chopra is also the brand ambassador of ADEX India and Jovees Herbal. Chopra received the award for Outstanding Achiever in "Arts, Entertainment, Culture" category at the India UK Achievers Honours in 2023. Over the years, Chopra has impressed fashion critics with her impeccable sense of style. Chopra is among the highest-grossing actresses in Indian cinema.

== Accolades ==
Chopra is a recipient of the National Film Award – Special Mention for Ishaqzaade (2012) and the Filmfare Award for Best Female Debut for Ladies vs Ricky Bahl (2011). Additionally, she has been nominated for four more Filmfare Awards: Best Supporting Actress for Ladies vs Ricky Bahl (2011) and Best Actress for Ishaqzaade (2012), Shuddh Desi Romance (2013), and Sandeep Aur Pinky Faraar (2021).
