= Vaani Kapoor =

Indian actress (born 1988)

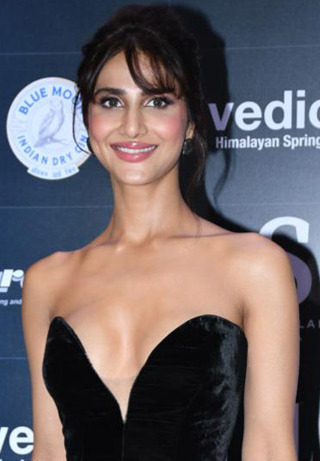
- Kapoor in 2023
- Born: 23 August 1988 (age 38); Delhi, India
- Education: Indira Gandhi National Open University (B.A.)
- Occupation: Actress
- Years active: 2013–present

Vaani Kapoor (born 23 August 1988) is an Indian actress who works in Hindi films. After completing a bachelor's degree in tourism studies, she made her acting debut with Yash Raj Films' romantic comedy film Shuddh Desi Romance (2013), for which she received the Filmfare Award for Best Female Debut.

After facing criticism for her performances in the company's romantic comedies Aaha Kalyanam (2014) and Befikre (2016), she took a three-year hiatus. Kapoor has since earned commercial success with brief roles of the love interest in action thriller War (2019) and crime thriller Raid 2 (2025). She also gained praise for starring as a transgender woman in the romantic comedy Chandigarh Kare Aashiqui (2021).

== Early life ==
Kapoor was born in Delhi, India, into a Punjabi Hindu family. Kapoor's father Shiv Kapoor is a furniture exports entrepreneur and her mother Dimpy Kapoor is a teacher-turned marketing executive. She did her schooling from Mata Jai Kaur Public School in Ashok Vihar, North West Delhi. Later she enrolled in Indira Gandhi National Open University at Maidan Garhi, completing a bachelor's degree in tourism studies, after which she took up an internship with Oberoi Hotels & Resorts in Jaipur, Rajasthan and later worked for ITC Hotel Mumbai. She was signed by the Elite Model Management for modelling projects.

== Career ==
=== Early success and hiatus (2013–2017) ===
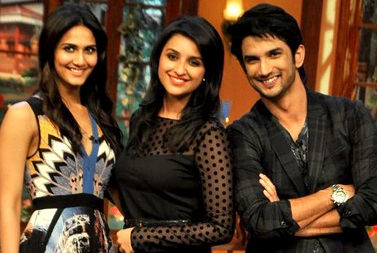
Kapoor with her co-stars Sushant Singh Rajput and Parineeti Chopra promoting their film Shuddh Desi Romance in 2013

Kapoor started her career in the Hindi film industry by signing a three films deal with Yash Raj Films. She was selected through an audition to play a supporting role in the romantic comedy Shuddh Desi Romance, alongside Sushant Singh Rajput and Parineeti Chopra. The film dealt with the subject of live-in relationships; it received positive feedback from critics, and Kapoor's portrayal of an outspoken girl, Tara, was praised. Mohar Basu of Koimoi wrote that Kapoor was "a pleasant debutant though she isn’t an overtly powerful actress" while Madhureeta Mukherjee of The Times Of India thought that she was "impressive, pretty and commands a good screen-presence". Shuddh Desi Romance collected ₹76 crore (US$9.8 million) at the box-office worldwide and emerged as a commercial success. At the 59th Filmfare Awards, Kapoor was awarded with the Best Female Debut award.

Kapoor's next release was the Tamil romantic comedy Aaha Kalyanam, an official remake of the 2010 Hindi film Band Baaja Baaraat. She was cast opposite Nani and learned the Tamil language for the film. Upon release, the film was panned by critics and her performance was poorly received. In 2016, Kapoor appeared in Aditya Chopra's romantic comedy Befikre opposite Ranveer Singh, which was set in Paris. She played Shyra Gill, a French tourist guide of Indian descent whose romantic liaisons with Singh's character leads to conflict between them. The film received negative reviews from critics and was considered to be a box-office failure. In 2017, she appeared in a music video titled "Main Yaar Manana Ni" by Yashita Sharma under the label of YRF.

=== War and career fluctuations (2019–present) ===
After a three-year break from films, she appeared in Yash Raj Films' action thriller War (2019) opposite Hrithik Roshan, directed by Siddharth Anand. Upon release, War broke several opening day records and finally emerged as the highest-grossing Indian film of 2019 with a gross of ₹475 crore worldwide, thereby being her most successful film so far. However, she was criticised for her limited screen space, and her presence was widely considered as mainly to add a glamour quotient.

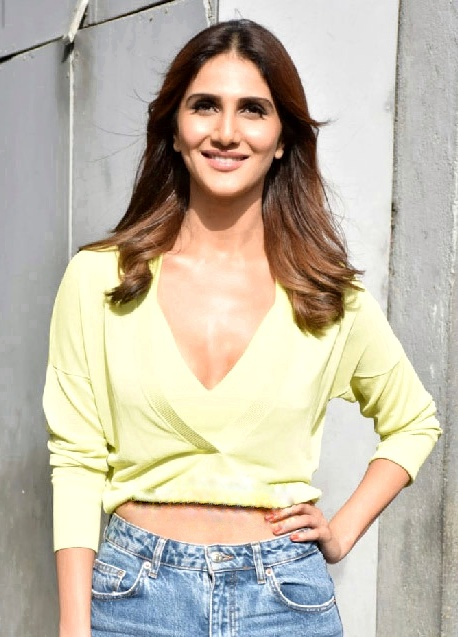
Kapoor in 2021

In 2021, she teamed up with Akshay Kumar in Bell Bottom, which marked her first film not to be produced by Yash Raj Films. The film was a commercial failure, and she was criticised for choosing another androcentric film after War featuring her in a brief role. Hindustan Times noted, "Kapoor is charming as Akshay's onscreen wife, and for a change, she isn't there just as a trophy wife but complements his character well." Later that year, Kapoor starred in the romantic drama Chandigarh Kare Aashiqui opposite Ayushmann Khurrana. She was praised for her portrayal of a transgender woman in the film. Writing for Times of India, Hiren Kotwani opined that "Kapoor sinks her teeth into her character from the word go and gives a no-holds-barred performance" while also praising her chemistry with Khurrana.

In 2022, Kapoor appeared opposite Ranbir Kapoor in Yash Raj Films' period actioner Shamshera whose release was delayed by two years due to the COVID-19 pandemic. It opened to highly negative reviews and poor box-office returns. Writing for Bollywood Hungama opined, "Kapoor's character is not well fleshed out. Audiences may be bewildered to see her leave a fine dancing career and turn into a rebel". Her next release was two years later in the ensemble comedy film Khel Khel Mein, which served as a remake of the 2016 Italian film Perfect Strangers. Titas Chowdhury of News18 bemoaned that Kapoor did not get adequate scope to perform unlike some of the other actors in the ensemble.

In her first film of 2025, Kapoor played an IRS officer's wife opposite Ajay Devgn in Raid 2, replacing Ileana D'Cruz from the prequel. Saibal Chatterjee dismissed her role and found her to be "strictly superficial" compared to D'Cruz. The film emerged as Kapoor's first commercial success since War. Kapoor made her foray into streaming with Netflix's Mandala Murders, a thriller series which starred her as a detective investigating a series of murders linked to a cult. In a negative review for India Today, Anisha Rao commended Kapoor for selecting an against-type role but found her performance lacking in emotional depth, particularly in scenes "that require vulnerability or raw intensity".

== Media image ==
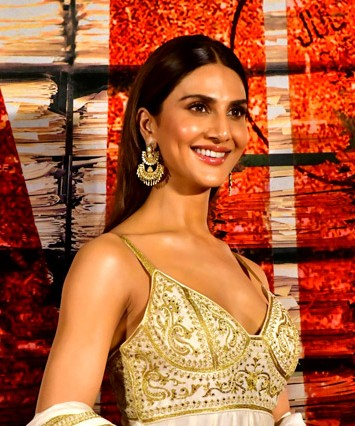
Kapoor in 2025

Post her film debut, The Times of India named her the "Most Promising Female Newcomer" of 2013. Kapoor became the seventh most trended actress on Google in India, in 2016. Kapoor is a celebrity endorser for several brands and products including Mango, Lotus Herbals, AJIO and Realme. Vaani Kapoor walked the ramp for designer Nikhita Tandon at the India Runway Week 2019 Winter Festive edition.

== Filmography ==
=== Films ===
Key
†	Denotes films that have not yet been released

Year	Title	Role	Notes	Ref.
2013	Shuddh Desi Romance	Tara		
2014	Aaha Kalyanam	Shruthi Subramaniam	Tamil film	
2016	Befikre	Shyra Gill		
2019	War	Naina Sahni		
2021	Bell Bottom	Radhika Malhotra		
2021	Chandigarh Kare Aashiqui	Maanvi Brar		
2022	Shamshera	Sona		
2024	Khel Khel Mein	Vartika Malik		
2025	Raid 2	Malini Patnaik		
2025	Aabeer Gulaal	Gulaal Bajaj		
TBA	Sarvagunn Sampann †	TBA	Filming	
TBA	Badtameez Gill †	TBA	Filming	

=== Television ===
Year	Title	Role	Notes	Ref.
2025	Mandala Murders	Rea Thomas & Nandini Pant	Netflix Series	

=== Music video appearances ===
Year	Title	Singer(s)	Label	Ref.
2017	"Main Yaar Manana Ni"	Yashita Sharma	YRF	
2025	"Aadat"	Yo Yo Honey Singh & AP Dhillon	T-Series	

== Awards and nominations ==
Year	Award	Category	Work	Result	Ref.
2013	BIG Star Entertainment Awards	Most Entertaining Film Debut (Female)	Shuddh Desi Romance	Won	
2014	Filmfare Awards	Best Female Debut	Shuddh Desi Romance	Won	
2014	International Indian Film Academy Awards	Star Debut of the Year (Female)	Shuddh Desi Romance	Won	
2014	Star Guild Awards	Best Female Debut	Shuddh Desi Romance	Won	
2014	Zee Cine Awards	Best Female Debut	Shuddh Desi Romance	Won	
2014	Zee Cine Awards	Best Supporting Actress	Shuddh Desi Romance	Nominated	
2014	Screen Awards	Best Female Debut	Shuddh Desi Romance	Nominated	
2019	Screen Awards	Best Supporting Actress	War	Nominated	
2022	Indian Film Festival of Melbourne	Disruptor in Cinema	Chandigarh Kare Aashiqui	Won	
2022	Iconic Gold Awards	Powerback Performance of the Year	Chandigarh Kare Aashiqui	Won	
2023	Pinkvilla Style Icons Awards	Super Stylish Charismatic Diva	—N/a	Won	
2023	Bollywood Hungama Style Icons	Most Stylish Trend Setter (Female)	—N/a	Nominated	
2023	Bollywood Hungama Style Icons	Most Stylish Mould Breaking Star (Female)	—N/a	Won	
