= IIFA Award for Star Debut of the Year – Female =

Annual award of the International Indian Film Academy

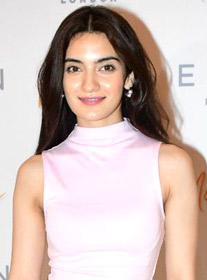
- The 2025 Recipient: Pratibha Ranta
- Awarded for: Best Debut Performance by an Actress
- Country: India
- Presented by: International Indian Film Academy
- First award: Kareena Kapoor – Refugee; Shamita Shetty – Mohabbatein; Preeti Jhangiani – Mohabbatein; Kim Sharma – Mohabbatein (2001)
- Currently held by: Pratibha Ranta, Laapataa Ladies (2025)
- Website: IIFA Awards

The IIFA Award for Star Debut of the Year – Female is given by the International Indian Film Academy, as part of its annual award ceremony to recognise a female actor who has delivered an outstanding performance in her debut film. Originally known as the "IIFA Award for Fresh Face of the Year (Female)", it was officially given its new title in 2005. During its inaugural year in 2001, four separate actresses were presented with an award.

== Superlatives ==
- Only five actresses who won were also nominated in the Best Actress category in the same year; In chronological order they are, Gracy Singh (2002), Vidya Balan (2006), Kangana Ranaut (2007), Deepika Padukone (2008) and Asin (2009).
- Only three actresses who won were also nominated in the Best Supporting Actress category in the same year; In chronological order they are, Bipasha Basu (2002), Parineeti Chopra (2012) and Disha Patani (2017). Parineeti Chopra is the only actress who won both the awards in the same year.
- Kareena Kapoor, Vidya Balan, Kangana Ranaut, Kriti Sanon and Deepika Padukone are the only recipients who also won the IIFA Award for Best Actress later.
- Kangana Ranaut and Parineeti Chopra are the only recipients who also won the IIFA Award for Best Supporting Actress. While Chopra won in the same year, Ranaut won it later in the year 2009.
- Kangana Ranaut is the only recipient who won both Best Actress and Best Supporting Actress award.

== Winners ==
=== 1990s ===
- 1999 Not awarded

=== 2000s ===
- 2001
  Kareena Kapoor – Refugee as Nazneen "Naaz" Ahmed (tied with) Kim Sharma, Preeti Jhangiani and Shamita Shetty – Mohabbatein as Sanjana, Kiran and Ishika Dhanrajgir
- 2002
  Bipasha Basu – Ajnabee as Sonia/Neeta (tied with) Gracy Singh – Lagaan as Gauri
- 2003
  Esha Deol – Koi Mere Dil Se Poochhe as Esha Singh
- 2004
  Amrita Rao – Ishq Vishk
- 2005
  Ayesha Takia – Taarzan: The Wonder Car as Priya
- 2006
  Vidya Balan – Parineeta as Lalita
- 2007
  Kangana Ranaut – Gangster as Simran
- 2008
  Deepika Padukone – Om Shanti Om as Shantipriya/Sandhya (Sandy)
- 2009
  Asin – Ghajini as Kalpana Shetty

=== 2010s ===
- 2010
  Jacqueline Fernandez – Aladin as Jasmine (tied with) Mahi Gill – Dev.D as Parminder (Paro)
- 2011
  Sonakshi Sinha – Dabangg as Rajjo
- 2012
  Parineeti Chopra – Ladies vs Ricky Bahl as Dimple Chaddha
- 2013
  Yami Gautam – Vicky Donor as Ashima Roy Arora
- 2014
  Vaani Kapoor – Shuddh Desi Romance as Tara
- 2015
  Kriti Sanon – Heropanti as Dimpy
- 2016
  Bhumi Pednekar – Dum Laga Ke Haisha as Sandhya Verma
- 2017
  Disha Patani – M.S. Dhoni: The Untold Story as Priyanka Jha
- 2018
  Not awarded
- 2019
  Sara Ali Khan – Kedarnath as Mandakani "Mukku" Mishra

=== 2020s ===
- 2020
  Ananya Panday – Student of the Year 2 as Shreya Randhawa
- 2022
  Sharvari – Bunty Aur Babli 2 as Sonia "Babli" Rawat
- 2023
  Khushalii Kumar – Dhokha: Round D Corner as Saanchi Sinha
- 2024
  Alizeh Agnihotri – Farrey as Niyati Singh
- 2025
  Pratibha Ranta – Laapataa Ladies as Jaya Tripathi Singh / Pushpa Rani

== See also ==
- International Indian Film Academy Awards
- IIFA Award for Star Debut of the Year – Male
