= Daawat-e-Ishq =

2014 Indian film by Habib Faisal

- Theatrical release poster
- Directed by: Habib Faisal
- Written by: Habib Faisal; Jyoti Kapoor
- Produced by: Aditya Chopra
- Starring: Parineeti Chopra; Aditya Roy Kapur; Anupam Kher
- Cinematography: Himman Dhamija
- Edited by: Meghna Sen
- Music by: Songs: Sajid–Wajid; Score: Hitesh Modak
- Production company: Yash Raj Films
- Distributed by: Yash Raj Films
- Release date: 19 September 2014
- Running time: 123 minutes
- Country: India
- Language: Hindi
- Budget: ₹32 crore
- Box office: est. ₹35.58 crore

Daawat-e-Ishq (transl. Feast of love) is a 2014 Indian Hindi-language romantic comedy film directed by Habib Faisal, and produced by Aditya Chopra under the banner of Yash Raj Films. It stars Parineeti Chopra, Aditya Roy Kapur and Anupam Kher in the lead roles. The soundtrack was composed by Sajid–Wajid.

The film was released on 19 September 2014, to mostly positive reviews. The Hindu said Daawat-e-Ishq was a "potent recipe," and the Times of India gave it four stars out of five. The film collected ₹12.7 crore (US$1.3 million) at the box office in its first week run.

== Plot ==
Gulrez "Gullu" Qadir lives in a lower-middle-class Hyderabadi mohalla and works at a mall as a shoe-sales girl with dreams of going to America. She lives along with her father Abdul Qadir who is looking for a suitable match for her but can't afford to pay big dowry, which will only get her some uncouth crude fellow. This doesn't make Gullu lose her optimism and humour. In her quest to find her Mr. Universe, she falls in love with Amjad and they decide to get married. Things do not work out as Amjad's parents ask for Rs. 80 lakhs in dowry. Enraged, Gullu plans to trap a dowry-hungry groom under IPC 498A (dowry act) and to recover lacs of money from him to fulfill her dream of going to America.

She and her father go to Lucknow with fake identities and intercept the manager of a renowned restaurant "Big Boss Haidari Kebab," known as Tariq "Taru" Haider. They choose Tariq as their target and when Tariq's parents ask for dowry from Abdul, she secretly records the entire conversation. During the three days before the wedding, Taru and Gullu get to know each other and Gullu starts falling for Taru. To her surprise, Taru gives her Rs. 40 lakhs in cash from his own savings, which his father asked for dowry. This way, Taru's father can maintain his conventions. And when Gullu's father gives Taru's father the 40 lakhs, it will not have been a real dowry.

Gullu still sticks with her plan of drugging Taru on their wedding night and runs away with all the cash — also recovering 40 lakhs more from Taru's family via a police officer, blackmailing him to file charges under section 498A. Taru decides to take revenge as he finds out her real identity. Meanwhile, Gullu and Abdul start preparing to leave for America. Gullu feels remorseful and guilty about scamming an honest person and decides to return all the money. When they reach the railway station to board a train to Lucknow, Gullu is confronted by Taru. Gullu returns all the money and confesses her love for him. They reunite and plan a real wedding without any dowry. Meanwhile, Amjad realizes his mistake after seeing their wedding video and confronts his parents for demanding a dowry. The film ends with Gullu opening a shoe shop in a mall named "GULLU".

== Cast ==
- Parineeti Chopra as Gulrez "Gullu" Qadir / Sania Habibullah
- Aditya Roy Kapur as Tariq "Taru" Haidar
- Anupam Kher as Abdul Qadir / Shahriyar Habibullah
- Karan Wahi as Amjad Baig
- Sumit Gaddi as Neeraj
- Poojan Parikh as Tariq Haider's Dad
- Ritesh M M Shukla as Haider staff 6th

== Production ==
Daawat-e-Ishq is the second collaboration between Habib Faisal and Parineeti Chopra after Ishaqzaade (2012). Television actor Karan Wahi made his silver-screen debut with this film. Anupam Kher was to star. The film was extensively shot in Hyderabad and Lucknow.

== Soundtrack ==
Daawat-e-Ishq

Soundtrack album by Sajid–Wajid
- Released: 17 July 2014
- Genre: Feature film soundtrack
- Length: 27:56
- Language: Hindi
- Label: YRF Music

Sajid–Wajid chronology
Heropanti (2014)	Daawat-e-Ishq (2014)	Tevar (2014)
External audio
- Audio Jukebox on YouTube

The full soundtrack was released by YRF Music on 17 July 2014.

All lyrics are written by Kausar Munir; all music is composed by Sajid–Wajid.

Daawat-e-Ishq Soundtrack
No.	Title	Singer(s)	Length
1.	"Daawat-e-Ishq"	Javed Ali, Sunidhi Chauhan	5:20
2.	"Mannat"	Keerthi Sagathia, Sonu Nigam, Shreya Ghoshal	4:59
3.	"Rangreli"	Wajid, Shreya Ghoshal	3:54
4.	"Shayarana"	Shalmali Kholgade	4:16
5.	"Jaadu Tone Waaliyan"	Shabab Sabri	4:12
6.	"Mannat" (Reprise)	Sonu Nigam, Shreya Ghoshal	2:55
7.	"Daawat-e-Ishq" (Instrumental)	-	1:50
Total length:			27:56

== Box office ==
The film was supposed to release on 5 September but was postponed to 19 September to avoid competition with Mary Kom. The film collected ₹3.25 crore (US$340,000) on its opening day and collected approximately ₹12 crore (US$1.2 million) on its opening weekend. Daawat-e-Ishq ended its theatrical run with worldwide collections of ₹35.58 crore (US$3.7 million).

== Awards and nominations ==
Award	Category	Recipients and nominees	Result	Ref.
7th Mirchi Music Awards	Best Song Engineer (Recording & Mixing)	Shakeel Ahmed, Vijay Dayal & Dipesh Sharma - "Mannat"	Nominated	
