= Amar Singh Chamkila (film) =

2024 Indian film by Imtiaz Ali

- Official release poster
- Directed by: Imtiaz Ali
- Written by: Imtiaz Ali; Sajid Ali
- Based on: Amar Singh Chamkila
- Produced by: Imtiaz Ali; Mohit Choudhary
- Starring: Diljit Dosanjh; Parineeti Chopra
- Cinematography: Sylvester Fonseca
- Edited by: Aarti Bajaj
- Music by: A. R. Rahman
- Production companies: Window Seat Films; Select Media Holdings LLP; Saregama
- Distributed by: Netflix
- Release dates: 8 April 2024 (Mumbai); 12 April 2024 (Netflix)
- Running time: 146 minutes
- Country: India
- Language: Hindi

Amar Singh Chamkila is a 2024 Indian Hindi-language biographical drama film based on the life of musician Amar Singh Chamkila. It is directed, produced and co-written by Imtiaz Ali. The film stars Diljit Dosanjh in the titular role, with Parineeti Chopra as his second wife, Amarjot.

The film's music is composed by A. R. Rahman, with lyrics written by Irshad Kamil. Principal photography began in December 2022 and ended in March 2023. The film premiered at Mumbai on 8 April 2024, and released on Netflix on 12 April 2024 and received critical acclaim, with many calling it a return-to-form for Imtiaz Ali's career.

== Plot ==
Amar Singh, born in a Ravidassia Dalit Sikh family in Punjab was working in a socks manufacturing factory (much to his dismay) as a teenager, whereas his heart and soul were wrenched in creating music. He finally chose to break the shackles and started building contacts with musicians in the state with the help of his acquaintances. He started working under a known musician and singer Jatinder Jinda (Surinder Shinda), who acknowledged his talent and began to use his lyrics in his songs (without giving any credit to Amar Singh). As a blessing in disguise, he got a chance to sing in place of Jinda as he was late and the public went berserk with Amar Singh's performance (the name "Chamkila" was first associated with him at this event) to the extent that they did not want to listen to the lead singer Jinda anymore, such was the power of his voice and lyrics. The rest of the movie follows his life's journey after that event including his unsolved assassination.

== Cast ==
- Diljit Dosanjh as Amar Singh Chamkila
- Parineeti Chopra as Amarjot Kaur
- Apinderdeep Singh as Swarn Singh Sivia
- Nisha Bano as Sonia
- Rahul Mittra as DSP Bhatti
- Anjum Batra as Kesar Singh Tiki
- Udaybir Sandhu as Jitender Jinda
- Sahiba Bali as Interview Reporter
- Tushar Dutt as Pirthipal Singh Dhakkan
- Robbie Johal as Kikar Dalewala
- Pavneet Singh as Babbu
- Anuraag Arora as Dalbir Singh
- Jasmeet Singh Bhatia as Constable
- Pranav Vashisht as Pamma
- Kul Sidhu as Gurmel Kaur
- Ankit Sagar as Kashmiri Lal
- Anjali Sharma as Amarjot's sister
- Mohit Chauhan (special appearance)
- Kumud Mishra as Ahmed (special appearance)

== Production ==
=== Development ===
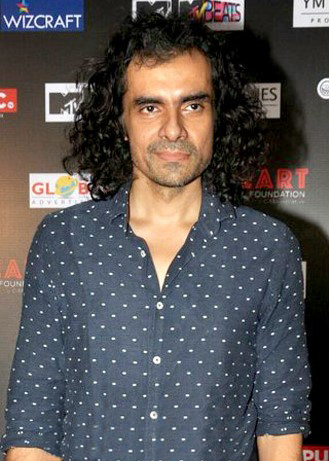
The film marked Imtiaz Ali's return as a director after four years.

Imtiaz Ali, known for modern relationship dramas such as Jab We Met (2007), Love Aaj Kal (2009), Rockstar (2011) and Tamasha (2015), announced the film under his banner Window Seat Films. The film follows the journey of Punjab's original rockstar of the masses, Amar Singh Chamkila, who was assassinated at a young age. Ali termed the film "a unique journey" for him and further added, "Shooting for Chamkila felt like a very different experience as a filmmaker. The film follows the crazed popularity of Chamkila's daring songs that society could neither ignore nor swallow. It helped me reconnect with a different side of myself."

The film was initially titled Chamkila and was later changed to Amar Singh Chamkila. Parineeti Chopra and Diljit Dosanjh have sung a total of 15 songs for the film. On this, Chopra stated, "One of the main reasons I did this film was because I was getting to sing some 15 songs for it." The film marks Ali's return as a director after four years.

=== Casting ===
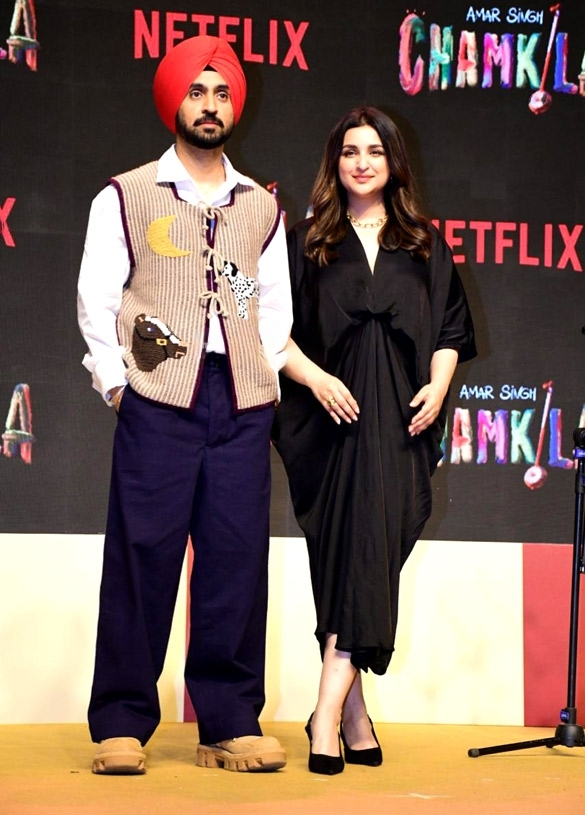
Diljit Dosanjh and Parineeti Chopra were cast as the leads because of them being actors who can sing too.

Diljit Dosanjh was cast to play the titular role of Amar Singh Chamkila. Dosanjh said, "Playing Amar Singh Chamkila has been one of the most challenging experiences of my life."

Parineeti Chopra was cast as Chamkila's second wife, Amarjot Kaur. Chopra left Sandeep Reddy Vanga's Animal, to be a part of the project, due to schedule conflicts. Chopra stated, "It's one of the most exciting films that I've ever worked on." For her role in the film, Chopra gained 15 kilos which led to pregnancy rumours surfing the internet.

On casting Dosanjh and Chopra, Ali stated: "I could not have asked for better actors than the immensely talented Diljit Dosanjh and Parineeti Chopra to play in this film, especially since it involves some live singing." Later, filmmaker Rahul Mittra was cast in a pivotal role by Ali.

=== Filming ===
The principal photography was started in December 2022. Set primarily in Punjab, the film was shot at real locations throughout the state. Both Chopra and Dosanjh completed the shooting in March 2023, and the filming was wrapped up by the end of March. Shooting locations in Punjab including Sangrur, Ludhiana and Mehsampur. A portion has also been shot in Mumbai.

== Soundtrack ==
The soundtrack album and background score are composed by A. R. Rahman. The song lyrics are penned by Irshad Kamil. The soundtrack album was released on March 29, 2024, through the record label Saregama. Unlike the release pattern of music albums of Hindi films on Netflix, the soundtrack was released prior to the film release. On May 29, 2024, the live album of recordings used in the background score of the film was released through the record label Saregama. The 14 tracks, majority of them Dosanjh and Chopra have live recorded in their own voice for their stage performances in the film. Lyricist Irshad Kamil and Rahman designed the songs rooted with rhythm changes and adapted them to the type of Broadway musical. As per him, the soundtrack album is in Punjabi and the parlance of the songs was more common than the soundtrack of Rockstar. The tracks conveyed philosophy by Chamkila but the genre was pop. Rahman called the music of the film "a very naughty picture". After a musical reconnaissance, Kamil pointed out existent "naughty" Punjabi lyrics sung by females in musical compositions by Chamkila.

== Release ==
The film's premiere was held in Mumbai on 8 April 2024. The film was released on 12 April 2024 on Netflix, coinciding with Baisakhi.

== Reception ==
Amar Singh Chamkila's eldest daughter Amandeep Kaur showed disappointment with Imtiaz Ali. She said Imtiaz Ali didn't do justice with the film by omitting the crucial moments of her family especially her mother Gurmail Kaur performing the last rites of her father. She further said Imtiaz Ali showed everyone from Amarjot's family, the second wife of Amar Singh Chamkila, but no one from her family.

=== Critical response ===
Amar Singh Chamkila received critical acclaim, with reviewers praising Dosanjh and Chopra 's performances, the film's soundtrack, and Ali's direction. (Note: Attributed to multiple references:) On the review aggregator website Rotten Tomatoes, 88% of 24 critics' reviews are positive, with an average rating of 7.4/10.

Sukanya Verma of Rediff.com rated 4/5 stars and observed "Diljit Dosanjh's switch in singing style as he smoothly assumes Amar Singh Chamkila's vocal persona highlights the brilliance of his artistry." Saibal Chatterjee of NDTV gave the film 4 stars out of 5 and noted, "The film is mournful and festive, animated and pensive, consciously crafted and seemingly spontaneous." Shubhra Gupta of The Indian Express rated the film 3/5 and wrote, "Diljit Dosanjh internalises Amar Singh Chamkila’s hard-scrabble life and pain, and distills it into his fine-grained performance, playing an artiste who lived and died by his beliefs."

== Awards and nominations ==
Award	Date of ceremony	Category	Recipient(s)	Result	Ref(s)
Indian Film Festival of Melbourne	16 August 2024	Best Film	Amar Singh Chamkila	Nominated	
Indian Film Festival of Melbourne	16 August 2024	Breakout Film Of The Year	Amar Singh Chamkila	Won	
Indian Film Festival of Melbourne	16 August 2024	Best Director	Imtiaz Ali	Nominated	
Indian Film Festival of Melbourne	16 August 2024	Best Actor	Diljit Dosanjh	Nominated	
Bollywood Hungama OTT India Fest	4 October 2024	Best Original Film	Amar Singh Chamkila	Won	
Filmfare OTT Awards	1 December 2024	Best Film – Web Original	Amar Singh Chamkila	Won	
Filmfare OTT Awards	1 December 2024	Best Director – Web Original	Imtiaz Ali	Won	
Filmfare OTT Awards	1 December 2024	Best Actor in a Web Original Film – Male	Diljit Dosanjh	Won	
Filmfare OTT Awards	1 December 2024	Best Actor in a Web Original Film – Female	Parineeti Chopra	Nominated	
Filmfare OTT Awards	1 December 2024	Best Background Music – Web Original	A. R. Rahman	Won	
Filmfare OTT Awards	1 December 2024	Best Original Screenplay – Web Original	Imtiaz Ali, Sajid Ali	Won	
Filmfare OTT Awards	1 December 2024	Best Dialogue – Web Original	Imtiaz Ali, Sajid Ali	Won	
Filmfare OTT Awards	1 December 2024	Best Production Design – Web Original	Suman Roy Mahapatra	Nominated	
Filmfare OTT Awards	1 December 2024	Best Cinematography – Web Original	Sylvester Fonseca	Won	
Filmfare OTT Awards	1 December 2024	Best Editing – Web Original	Aarti Bajaj	Won	
Filmfare OTT Awards	1 December 2024	Best Sound Design – Web Original	Dhiman Karmakar	Won	
Asian Academy Creative Awards	4 December 2025	Best Feature Film	Amar Singh Chamkila	Nominated	
Asian Academy Creative Awards	4 December 2025	Best Direction (Fiction)	Imtiaz Ali	Nominated	
Asian Academy Creative Awards	4 December 2025	Best Editing	Aarti Bajaj	Nominated	
Asian Academy Creative Awards	4 December 2025	Best Sound	Dhiman Karmakar	Nominated	
International Emmy Awards	24 November 2025	Best Performance by an Actor	Diljit Dosanjh	Nominated	
International Emmy Awards	24 November 2025	Best TV Movie or Miniseries	Amar Singh Chamkila	Nominated	
