= Kill Dil =

2014 Indian film by Shaad Ali

- Theatrical release poster
- Directed by: Shaad Ali
- Written by: Nitesh Tiwari; Shreyas Jain; Nikhil Mehrotra
- Produced by: Aditya Chopra
- Starring: Parineeti Chopra; Ranveer Singh; Ali Zafar; Govinda
- Cinematography: Avik Mukhopadhyay
- Edited by: Ritesh Soni
- Music by: Songs: Shankar–Ehsaan–Loy; Score: Shankar–Ehsaan–Loy; Jim Satya
- Production company: Yash Raj Films
- Distributed by: Yash Raj Films
- Release date: 13 November 2014
- Running time: 127 minutes
- Country: India
- Language: Hindi
- Budget: est. ₹40 crore
- Box office: est. ₹52.1 crore

Kill Dil (transl. Kill heart) is a 2014 Indian Hindi-language crime comedy film directed by Shaad Ali and produced by Aditya Chopra under the Yash Raj Films banner. The film stars Ranveer Singh, Ali Zafar, Parineeti Chopra, and Govinda. The film was released on 13 November 2014 and received mixed reviews from critics.

== Plot ==
Tutu (Ali Zafar) and Dev Sharma (Ranveer Singh) are two orphans who were raised by a local gangster, Bhaiyaji (Govinda), to be assassins. Their lives take a turn when they meet Disha (Parineeti Chopra) at a club, after few days especially after the Birthday Party of Disha, Disha and Dev fall in love with each other.

Tutu gets Dev a fake MBA degree which helps Dev join an insurance company. Dev and Disha make plans to get married, while Disha is unaware of Dev's past. Bhaiyaji on learning the truth about Dev's job decides to play a trick to get him back. He sends one of his goons, Batuk, to kill Dev and informs Tutu. He also calls up Disha and tells her about Dev and Tutu's real identities. Just when Batuk is about to kill Dev, Tutu shoots him down in front of Disha. Disha is shocked with the reality and breaks up with Dev. This results in Dev again becoming an assassin.

Bhaiyaji gives them a fresh contract to kill his arch-enemy Baban Pehlwan. Dev and Tutu record a video telling the tale of how they became gangsters and send it to Disha. During a shootout, Dev is again unable to fire the gun and gets shot. Tutu takes him to the hospital, where after an operation, Dev finds Disha waiting for him and they both reconcile. Bhaiyaji gets killed by Baban Pehlwan. Dev and Disha get married while Tutu has a job interview at the same insurance company with a fake MBA degree.

== Cast ==
- Ranveer Singh as Dev Sharma
- Ali Zafar as Tutu Sharma
- Parineeti Chopra as Disha Sharma
- Govinda as Bhaiyaji, a gangster
- Alok Nath as Jeewan Sambandh Insurance Owner
- Jass Bhatia as Chimsy
- Maanvi Gagroo as Jenny
- Brijendra Kala as Jeweller
- Sukhwinder Singh as Dulha in the song "Happy Budday" (special appearance)
- Gulzar as Narrator (Voice-Over)

== Production ==
In February 2014, many scenes were filmed at Gautam Buddha University, Galgotias Campus One, and The Grand Venice Mall. The film was shot across various locations in Delhi. In April 2014, a schedule of the film with Zafar, Singh, and Chopra was shot at Lavasa and Kharghar in Mumbai. It was the first Indian film to release in 4DX.

== Reception ==
Sukanya Verma of Rediff said "It has random songs, birdbrained logic and a romance that's about as exciting as toothpaste". Saibal Chaterjee from NDTV gave the film 2 stars and wrote "Watch Kill Dil if you have plenty of time to kill. It is unlikely to deliver much joy to your dil, though". DNA India gave 2 out of 5 stars, writing that it fails to connect with audiences, while praising Govinda's performance.

== Box office ==
The film grossed ₹200 million (US$2.1 million) in India on its opening weekend, recouping most of its budget. Overseas, it collected ₹80.8 million (US$840,000) across its opening weekend, making ₹281 million (US$2.9 million) worldwide in its first three days. In Pakistan, Kill Dil had the third-highest opening weekend gross of 2014 behind Kick and Happy New Year. In its first week it collected a total of ₹290 million (US$3.0 million) according to Box Office India.

== Soundtrack ==
Kill Dil

Soundtrack album by Shankar–Ehsaan–Loy
- Released: 9 October 2014
- Genre: Feature film soundtrack
- Length: 36:34
- Label: YRF Music
- Producer: Shankar–Ehsaan–Loy

Shankar–Ehsaan–Loy chronology
2 States (2014)	Kill Dil (2014)	Dil Dhadakne Do (2015)

Singles from Kill Dil
- 1. "Kill Dil" Released: 25 September 2014; 2. "Sweeta" Released: 2 October 2014

The music of the film was composed by Shankar–Ehsaan–Loy (Shankar Mahadevan, Ehsaan Noorani and Loy Mendonsa), with lyrics by Gulzar. The soundtrack comprises 8 songs. The soundtrack was released on 9 October 2014.

The title song of the film sung by Sonu Nigam and Shankar Mahadevan was released on 25 September 2014. Another single, "Sweeta", sung by Adnan Sami, was released on 2 October 2014.

No.	Title	Singer(s)	Length
1.	"Kill Dil" (title song)	Sonu Nigam, Shankar Mahadevan, Gulzar	5:50
2.	"Happy Budday"	Sukhwinder Singh, Shankar Mahadevan	4:29
3.	"Sajde"	Arijit Singh, Nihira Joshi Deshpande, Gulzar	5:25
4.	"Bol Beliya"	Shankar Mahadevan, Siddharth Mahadevan, Sunidhi Chauhan	4:57
5.	"Sweeta"	Adnan Sami	2:03
6.	"Daiyaa Maiyaa"	Udit Narayan, Shankar Mahadevan, Rasika Shekar, Javed Jaffrey	3:22
7.	"Baawra"	Shankar Mahadevan, Nihira Joshi Deshpande, Loy Mendonsa, Gulzar	6:35
8.	"Nakhriley"	Shankar Mahadevan, Ali Zafar, Mahalakshmi Iyer, Gulzar	5:14
Total length:			36:34

== Awards and nominations ==
=== Stardust Awards ===
- Best Supporting Actor - Govinda

=== Producers Guild Film Awards ===
- Best Villain - Govinda

== See also ==
- List of 4DX motion-enhanced films
