= Ladies vs Ricky Bahl =

2011 Indian film by Maneesh Sharma

- Theatrical release poster
- Directed by: Maneesh Sharma
- Screenplay by: Devika Bhagat; Habib Faisal
- Dialogues by: Habib Faisal
- Story by: Aditya Chopra
- Produced by: Aditya Chopra
- Starring: Parineeti Chopra; Ranveer Singh; Anushka Sharma; Dipannita Sharma; Aditi Sharma
- Cinematography: Aseem Mishra
- Edited by: Namrata Rao
- Music by: Salim–Sulaiman
- Production company: Yash Raj Films
- Distributed by: Yash Raj Films
- Release date: 9 December 2011
- Running time: 140 minutes
- Country: India
- Language: Hindi
- Box office: ₹84 crore

Ladies vs Ricky Bahl is a 2011 Indian Hindi-language crime comedy film directed by Maneesh Sharma and produced by Aditya Chopra under the banner of Yash Raj Films. The film stars Ranveer Singh, Anushka Sharma, Parineeti Chopra, Dipannita Sharma, and Aditi Sharma. Loosely inspired by the 2006 American film John Tucker Must Die, the screenplay was adapted by Devika Bhagat and Habib Faisal. The film follows a group of women who team up to exact revenge on Ricky Bahl, a smooth-talking con artist who had deceived each of them under different identities.

Ladies vs Ricky Bahl was released on 9 December 2011 and received mixed-to-positive reviews from critics, who praised its stylish presentation, humor, and the chemistry between Singh and Sharma, with particular praise directed towards Chopra's performance. The film also emerged as a commercial success at the box office, grossing ₹84 crore worldwide on a budget of ₹20 crore.

At the 57th Filmfare Awards, Parineeti Chopra earned two nominations—Best Supporting Actress and Best Female Debut, winning the latter. She went on to win both categories at the IIFA Awards and the Producers Guild Film Awards, and also received the Best Female Debut award at the Screen Awards, the Stardust Awards and the Zee Cine Awards.

== Plot ==
Dimple Chaddha, a spoiled and wealthy Delhi girl, falls for her fitness trainer, Sunny Singh, who charms her and pretends to be interested in marriage. He tells her about a disputed inheritance involving a property occupied by tenants. Dimple persuades her father to use his influence to evict the tenants, and they even lend Sunny ₹20 lakh to help him claim the property. However, it is later revealed that the inheritance was fabricated and the tenants were legal occupants. Sunny vanishes with the money, leaving Dimple heartbroken and embarrassed.

Meanwhile, in Mumbai, successful businesswoman Raina Parulekar purchases an expensive painting from Deven Shah, who claims to run an art gallery. Shortly after the transaction, Deven disappears with ₹60 lakh, and Raina learns the painting is fake. She publicly shares her story, which draws the attention of Dimple. They connect and are soon joined by Saira Rashid, a shy and trusting woman from Lucknow who was conned out of ₹10 lakh by a man named Iqbal Khan, whom she was romantically interested in.

The three women realize that Sunny, Deven, and Iqbal are the same man operating under different aliases. They nickname him “Bloody Kameena” (BK) and hatch a plan to con the conman. Raina, using her resources, finances the plan. They recruit Ishika Desai, a sharp-tongued and confident saleswoman from Mumbai, to pose as a wealthy NRI heiress and lure BK in.

Tracking him down to Goa, they discover he is now operating under the name Vikram Thapar, posing as the owner of a beachside water sports business. Ishika approaches him, pretending to be the daughter of a hotel-chain magnate looking to invest in a restaurant. Vikram quickly takes the bait and begins to court her, unaware of the setup.

To impress Ishika, Vikram offers to fund the restaurant's launch. Meanwhile, the women feed him fake bills, cheap materials, and fake staff, slowly recouping the money he stole from them. As Vikram grows closer to Ishika, he genuinely starts falling for her. After a successful launch party, he and Ishika spend time together and share a kiss. The next morning, he discovers Ishika meeting with the other women and realizes he has been conned.

Determined to retaliate, Vikram manipulates the situation and sells Ishika a worthless property for the restaurant. The women, believing Ishika has betrayed them, confront her and ask her to leave. Later, they find Vikram waiting at their hotel. He confesses to his past cons and expresses remorse, claiming he now understands how it feels to be deceived. He offers to return all the stolen money and insists he wants to turn over a new leaf.

As the women prepare to leave, they notice Ishika is heartbroken over BK, and they decide to help reunite the couple. He proposes to Ishika, tells her he wants to learn living an honest life with her help, and reveals his real name to be "Ricky Bahl".

== Cast ==
- Ranveer Singh as Ricky Bahl (Sunny Singh in Delhi, Deven Shah, Manoj Suri in Mumbai, Iqbal Khan in Lucknow, Vikram Thapar, Diego Vaz, Abhay Salaskar in Goa)
- Anushka Sharma as Ishika Desai (Ishika Patel)
- Parineeti Chopra as Dimple Chaddha
- Dipannita Sharma as Raina Parulekar
- Aditi Sharma as Saira Rashid
- Shireesh Sharma as Mr. Suresh Chaddha, Dimple's father
- Avijit Dutt as Raina's boss
- Akshay Anand as Raina's colleague
- Sheena Bajaj in a cameo appearance as the nurse in the title track
- Shruti Sharma as Customer in Story 3: Lucknow

== Reception ==
=== Box office ===
Ladies vs Ricky Bahl opened to strong occupancy in multiplexes, with many locations recording 90–100% attendance on its first day, particularly in the Delhi and Punjab regions. While multiplex-dominated urban areas saw good to decent turnout, single-screen cinemas reported comparatively lower footfalls. The film collected approximately ₹198.5 million on its opening day.

On its second day, collections improved significantly, reaching ₹445 million, and continued to rise on Sunday, earning ₹767.5 million, bringing the three-day weekend total to approximately ₹805 million. The film held steady on Monday, collecting around ₹815 million nett in four days.

By the end of its first week, the film grossed approximately ₹730 million nett, and continued to perform moderately well in the following weeks. Its lifetime theatrical earnings were around ₹840 million, and it was declared a box office hit.

=== Critical reception ===
Ladies vs Ricky Bahl was released in India on 9 December 2011 to mixed-to-positive reviews. Critics praised the film's performances—particularly Parineeti Chopra, who made her acting debut—as well as its premise and styling, though many noted shortcomings in its screenplay and execution.

Taran Adarsh of Bollywood Hungama rated the film 3 out of 5 stars, writing: "Ladies vs Ricky Bahl is, at best, a decent fare, which appeals in parts. The film starts well, even ends well. It’s the in-between that’s plain ordinary. Ideally, the film merits a 2.5 star rating, but that extra 0.5 star is for Singh and Anushka, who steal your heart with truly striking performances."

Nikhat Kazmi of The Times of India gave the film 2.5 stars out of 5, stating: "There is no humour, no earthy flavour, no tingling chemistry between the lead pair. What does work in favour of the film are its performances and its non-hysterical tenor."

NDTV gave the film 3.5 out of 5 stars, calling it "predictable" and noting a lack of strong chemistry between the leads, but still described it as enjoyable, particularly praising Singh's performance.

Rajeev Masand of IBN Live described the film as “watchable”, but remarked that it "could've been so much more fun."

Zee News rated it 3 out of 5 stars, calling it “a good option to get entertained this weekend and reconnect with the Band Baaja Baaraat jodi for some laughter and foot-stomping again.”

== Awards and nominations ==
| Award | Date of the ceremony | Category | Recipients | Result | Ref. |
|---|---|---|---|---|---|
| Zee Cine Awards | 21 January 2012 | Best Actor in a Supporting Role – Female | Dipannita Sharma | Nominated | |
| Zee Cine Awards | 21 January 2012 | Best Actor in a Supporting Role – Female | Parineeti Chopra | Nominated | |
| Zee Cine Awards | 21 January 2012 | Best Female Debut | Parineeti Chopra | Won | |
| Screen Awards | 22 January 2012 | Best Supporting Actress | Parineeti Chopra | Nominated | |
| Screen Awards | 22 January 2012 | Best Female Debut | Parineeti Chopra | Won | |
| Producers Guild Film Awards | 25 January 2012 | Best Actress in a Supporting Role | Parineeti Chopra | Won | |
| Producers Guild Film Awards | 25 January 2012 | Best Female Debut | Parineeti Chopra | Won | |
| Filmfare Awards | 29 January 2012 | Best Supporting Actress | Parineeti Chopra | Nominated | |
| Filmfare Awards | 29 January 2012 | Best Female Debut | Parineeti Chopra | Won | |
| Stardust Awards | 10 February 2012 | Star of the Year – Female | Anushka Sharma | Nominated | |
| Stardust Awards | 10 February 2012 | Best Actress in a Comedy or Romance | Anushka Sharma | Won | |
| Stardust Awards | 10 February 2012 | Superstar of Tomorrow – Female | Parineeti Chopra | Won | |
| IIFA Awards | 7–9 June 2012 | Best Supporting Actress | Parineeti Chopra | Won | |
| IIFA Awards | 7–9 June 2012 | Best Female Debut | Parineeti Chopra | Won | |
| Annual Central European Bollywood Awards India | 18 August 2012 | Best Supporting Actress | Parineeti Chopra | Nominated | |
| Annual Central European Bollywood Awards India | 18 August 2012 | Breakthrough Role – Female | Parineeti Chopra | Won | |
| People's Choice Awards India | 27 October 2012 | Favourite Debut Actor (Male/Female) | Parineeti Chopra (also for Ishaqzaade) | Won | |

== Soundtrack ==
Ladies Vs Ricky Bahl

Soundtrack album by Salim–Sulaiman
- Released: 2011
- Recorded: 2010
- Genre: Film soundtrack
- Label: Sony Music India
- Producer: Salim–Sulaiman

Salim–Sulaiman chronology
| Band Baaja Baaraat (2011) | Ladies Vs Ricky Bahl (2011) | Anaganaga O Dheerudu (2011) |

The film's music and soundtrack were composed by Salim–Sulaiman with lyrics penned by Amitabh Bhattacharya.

The song "Jigar Da Tukda" won the most atrocious lyrics award at the Golden Kela Awards in 2012.

Track listing
| No. | Title | Singer(s) | Length |
|---|---|---|---|
| 1. | "Aadat Se Majboor" | Benny Dayal, Ranveer Singh | 04:38 |
| 2. | "Thug Le" | Vishal Dadlani, Shweta Pandit | 03:39 |
| 3. | "Jigar Da Tukda" | Salim Merchant, Shraddha Pandit | 04:14 |
| 4. | "Jazba" | Shilpa Rao | 04:39 |
| 5. | "Aadat Se Majboor (Remix)" | Benny Dayal, Ranveer Singh | 04:34 |
| 6. | "Jazba (Remix)" | Anushka Manchanda | 04:02 |
| 7. | "Fatal Attraction" | Instrumental | 03:34 |
| Total length: | | | 28:00 |

== Plagiarism allegations ==
Ladies vs Ricky Bahl faced plagiarism allegations from multiple sources. Tamil film director Selva accused the makers of lifting the core premise from his 2007 film Naan Avan Illai and its 2009 sequel, both of which revolve around a con artist who deceives several women by assuming different identities. Separately, British author Jeffrey Archer alleged that the film borrowed elements from his 1976 novel Not a Penny More, Not a Penny Less, which also centers on a group of individuals conning a conman to recover their losses.

== See also ==
- John Tucker Must Die (2006)
- The Other Woman (2014)
