= Shuddh Desi Romance =

2013 Indian film by Maneesh Sharma

- Theatrical release poster
- Directed by: Maneesh Sharma
- Written by: Jaideep Sahni
- Produced by: Aditya Chopra
- Starring: Sushant Singh Rajput; Parineeti Chopra; Vaani Kapoor; Rishi Kapoor
- Cinematography: Manu Anand
- Edited by: Namrata Rao
- Music by: Sachin–Jigar
- Production company: Yash Raj Films
- Distributed by: Yash Raj Films
- Release date: 6 September 2013
- Running time: 141 minutes
- Country: India
- Language: Hindi
- Budget: est. ₹22 crore
- Box office: est. ₹76 crore

Shuddh Desi Romance, released internationally as A Pure Desi Romance, is a 2013 Indian Hindi-language romantic comedy drama film directed by Maneesh Sharma and produced by Aditya Chopra under the banner Yash Raj Films. The film stars Sushant Singh Rajput, Parineeti Chopra, and debutant Vaani Kapoor in the lead roles, with Rishi Kapoor in a supporting role. The story, set in Jaipur, Rajasthan, explores the views of the younger generation on commitment, live-in relationships and arranged marriages as compared to love marriages in small town India. It screened in the Gala Presentation section of the 2013 Toronto International Film Festival and released worldwide on 6 September 2013. Upon release, the film received positive reviews from critics with high praise for Chopra, Rajput, and Kapoor's performances, and emerged as a commercial success at the box-office.

== Plot ==
Raghu Ram is a tourist guide in Jaipur who doubles up as a rental baraati for Goyal, a wedding planner. Raghu is experiencing premarital jitters before his arranged marriage. Goyal has hired a fake baraat to accompany Raghu to his wedding, which includes Gayatri, an independent and open-minded woman who lives life on her own terms. On the way to his wedding venue in the bus, they kiss passionately. Raghu falls for Gayatri. A confused Raghu, heavily impressed by her freedom, gathers the guts to run away from his wedding.

A fortnight later, the two begin dating and eventually enter a live-in relationship. In India, such relationships are socially frowned upon, so they hide the relationship from their neighbours by pretending to be siblings. Mr. Gupta, Gayatri's neighbour, catches Raghu with Gayatri and tries to create distrust between them, but the couple can reconcile and decide to get married. However, on the wedding day, Gayatri runs out on him, and Raghu is left inconsolable.

Soon after, Raghu meets Tara at a wedding, the woman he would marry before he met Gayatri. She initially asks him out on a revenge trip but slowly falls for him. Just as Raghu is about to ask her to marry him at a wedding, he runs into Gayatri. The bride's mom sends Raghu and Gayatri to pick up the priest from the station. On the way, Gayatri tries to talk to Raghu, but he is reluctant. Later at dinner, Raghu finds Tara and Gayatri sitting on the same table. Tara tells him that she invited Gayatri to dinner on Sunday. Raghu gingerly makes an excuse to go to the bathroom. Gayatri follows him, and they confess their love for each other. Tara arrives and catches them in a loving embrace. Tara realises she doesn't love Raghu anymore and leaves without any explanation, while Raghu and Gayatri are led by Goyal to accept that they love each other and should marry.

Three days later, on the night of their marriage, Gayatri and Raghu run into each other at the main gate while trying to run away. Later, they meet at Gayatri's home, where Raghu says that he truly loves Gayatri, but he doesn't want to be imprisoned by marriage. They kiss and agree to resume their live-in relationship.

== Cast ==
- Sushant Singh Rajput as Raghu Ram
- Parineeti Chopra as Gayatri
- Vaani Kapoor as Tara
- Rishi Kapoor as Goyal "Tauji"
- Jitendra Parmar as Young Band Wala
- Bhuvan Arora as Raghu's friend
- Rajesh Sharma as Mausa Ji
- Swapnil Kamble as Baba
- Tarun Vyas as Mr. Gupta, Gayatri's neighbour
- Anirban Chowdhury as Prabir Chatterjee
- Nalneesh Neel as Tara's suitor

== Production ==
=== Development ===
The script was written by Jaideep Sahni, who has previously written such films as Company (2002), Bunty Aur Babli (2005), Khosla Ka Ghosla (2006) and Chak De! India (2007). The setting, Jaipur, was used to provide a contrast from the lifestyle of big cities and to depict how a traditional way of life complete with its hypocrisies co-exists in these smaller cities along with modern influences.

=== Filming ===
While the majority of the film was shot in and around Jaipur, Rajasthan, the title song was shot at Mehrangarh Fort and the palaces and bylanes in Jodhpur, Rajasthan with the lead actors, and choreographed by Ganesh Acharya.

== Soundtrack ==
Shuddh Desi Romance

Soundtrack album by Sachin–Jigar
- Released: 19 August 2013
- Recorded: 2013
- Genres: Feature film soundtrack, Rajasthani folk, bossa, techno
- Length: 23:56
- Label: YRF Music
- Producer: Aditya Chopra

Sachin–Jigar chronology
Issaq (2013)	Shuddh Desi Romance (2013)	Humpty Sharma Ki Dulhania (2014)

The soundtrack album was composed by the duo Sachin–Jigar, with lyrics written by Jaideep Sahni. It contains four vocal songs and the remaining tracks are instrumental. The tracks have a huge Rajasthani folk influence mixed with bossa and techno. The album was released on 19 August 2013.

No.	Title	Artist(s)	Length
1.	"Tere Mere Beech Mein"	Sunidhi Chauhan, Mohit Chauhan	4:12
2.	"Gulabi"	Jigar Saraiya, Priya Saraiya	3:51
3.	"Chanchal Mann Ati Random"	Divya Kumar	3:55
4.	"Shuddh Desi Romance"	Benny Dayal, Shalmali Kholgade	3:06
5.	"Mujhe Kiss Kar Sakte Ho"	Sachin–Jigar	2:21
6.	"Love in Jaipur"	Sachin–Jigar	2:04
7.	"Tez Waala Attraction"	Sachin–Jigar	1:31
8.	"Boyfriend Banogey"	Sachin–Jigar	1:40
9.	"So Remember"	Sachin–Jigar	1:16
Total length:			23:56

== Marketing and release ==
Shuddh Desi Romance was released on 6 September 2013. It was mainly a multiplex release on approximately 1100 screens. A teaser trailer of Dhoom 3 was attached to the prints. It has an investment of ₹250 million (US$2.7 million) including marketing and release costs.

=== Marketing ===
The trailer was launched at the Raj Mandir Cinema, Jaipur.

Yash Raj Films launched the poster with the digital poster on 17 June 2013. Sushant Singh Rajput introduced Vaani Kapoor at a song launch event on 1 August where they unveiled their song "Gulabi". The title track, "Shuddh Desi Romance" was released on 18 August 2013.

The star cast – Parineeti Chopra, Sushant Singh Rajput and Vaani Kapoor – promoted the film on 31 August 2013 in an appearance on the show Comedy Nights with Kapil. Sushant, Parineeti and Vaani promoted the film on the show DID Super Moms. The stars promoted it on Jhalak Dikhla Jaa where Sushant wooed Madhuri Dixit. Chopra and Kapoor with director Maneesh Sharma and writer Jaideep Sahni discussed the film at great length with the Indian Express team at the Screen Preview.

== Reception ==
=== Critical response ===
The movie received generally positive reviews, with praises mainly towards Chopra, Rajput and Kapoor's performances.

==== India ====
Taran Adarsh of Bollywood Hungama gave it 3.5 stars out of 5 and stated that Shuddh Desi Romance caters to and reflects the mindset of a lot of youth in modern society. Rajeev Masand of CNN-IBN gave 3.5 out of 5 and commented that "To a large extent, Shuddh Desi Romance reinvents the wheel as far as Bollywood rom-coms go. It's aggressively non-formulaic, and gives us characters who refuse to conform. The minor hiccups notwithstanding, this is a charming little film." Tushar Joshi of DNA gave it 3 stars and felt that Shuddh Desi Romance is refreshing, breezy and engaging. India Today gave it 3.5 stars. Mohar Basu of Koimoi gave 3.5 stars and remarked that the film is a heartfelt true take of real contemporary relationships. Sukanya Verma of Rediff gave it 3.5 stars and judged that Shuddh Desi Romance has no dull moments.

Khalid Mohammad of the Deccan Chronicle gave it 3 stars and wrote, "don't miss it for Ms Chopra and for the feisty first half. Post-break, you can catch 40, even 400 winks in your seat." Reshma Sengar of Zee News gave it 2.5 stars and summarised, "Although not as good as Band Baaja Baaraat and Ladies Vs Ricky Bahl, Maneesh Sharma's third directorial venture is "jhataak", peppy and colourful but still turns out only to be a onetime watch!" Anupama Chopra gave the film 4 stars and said Shuddh Desi Romance is "a dose of adrenalin, though it loses steam in the second half – it's almost as if, suddenly, Manish and Jaideep didn't know where to take their story and characters." The Times of India gave it 3 stars and stated that "the concept is engaging, but the plot is little shudd, little desi and quite confused". Rachit Gupta of Filmfare gave it 3 stars and said that the film is a crazy, witty and a soulful twist on getting hitched.

==== Overseas ====
Dawn's film critic Mohammad Kamran Jawaid said that "Shuddh Desi Romance has an innovative twist on the love triangle, spiffy songs, a mix of adequate to engaging performances (Mr. Rajput is adequate, Ms. Chopra is engaging, Ms. Kapoor is somewhere in between) and just about apt technical intelligence that doesn't overpower the story Mr. Sharma has in mind. So at the very least, it has a few aces up its sleeve." Jawaid, however, had a problem with the lack of morality in context of South Asian family values, writing "Young love, I can understand (and endorse) easy. Debasement of relationships to avoid public disgrace, amongst other puerilities, is a drastic measure for yours truly. The first world may disagree, but here in South Asia, it's the orthodox bond of family that count, not the drastic need to escape its ideals."

=== Box office ===
==== India ====
The film grossed ₹295 million (US$3.2 million) nett across its first five days at the domestic box office. It collected around Rs 362.7 million nett in week one. Shuddh Desi Romance collected around 12.5 million nett on its 8th day. Shuddh Desi Romance dropped in its second weekend collecting nearly 60 million nett. The ten-day total is Rs 420 million nett plus. Shuddh Desi Romance had Rs 85.8 million nett second week taking its two-week total to around Rs 450 million nett. The film nett. grossed Rs 10 million in third week taking its total to ₹463 million (US$4.9 million) nett.

==== Overseas ====
Shuddh Desi Romance grossed $1.08 million (Rs 7.04 cr) in its first weekend overseas. Shuddh Desi Romance did well in overseas as it has collected $1.7 million in ten days. The film crossed US$ 2 million overseas in three weeks.

== Awards ==
=== Filmfare Awards ===
- Best Female Debut – Vaani Kapoor
- Nominated – Best Actress – Parineeti Chopra

=== BIG Star Entertainment Awards ===
- Nominated – BIG Star Most Entertaining Actor in a Romantic Role - Male – Sushant Singh Rajput

=== IIFA Awards ===
- Star Debut of the Year - Female – Vaani Kapoor

== See also ==
- List of Indian romantic films
