= Dhoom 2 (soundtrack) =

Soundtrack album by Pritam
- Released: 19 October 2006
- Studios: YRF Studios, Mumbai; Spectral Harmony Studios, Mumbai
- Genre: Feature film soundtrack
- Length: 28:50
- Language: Hindi
- Label: YRF Music
- Producer: Aditya Chopra

Pritam chronology
Apna Sapna Money Money (2006)	Dhoom 2 (2006)	Bhagam Bhag (2006)

Dhoom 2 is the soundtrack album to the 2006 film Dhoom 2 directed by Sanjay Gadhvi and produced by Aditya Chopra under Yash Raj Films; the second instalment in the Dhoom franchise and the sequel to Dhoom (2004), it stars Abhishek Bachchan, Hrithik Roshan, Aishwarya Rai, Uday Chopra, and Bipasha Basu. The soundtrack was composed by Pritam with lyrics written by Sameer, and released through YRF Music on 19 October 2006. Despite the mixed critical reception, the album was the highest-selling Hindi film soundtrack of the year.

== Background ==
Composer Pritam and the duo Salim–Sulaiman, who scored the soundtrack and background music for Dhoom, returned for the sequel. Since the first film's music was commercially successful, Pritam felt overwhelmed on composing the music for the sequel. However, Chopra asked him to not take the pressure on his head and insisted to go with the flow and script. Pritam composed a new version of the title track "Dhoom Machale" with the use of trash materials as instruments "to give it a super cool vibe". At the process, he went to four bungalows and numerous shops around Andheri, where he bought tins, cans and vessels that would utilize as percussions. He did the same for the predecessor, where the main theme was created using the car horn sounds.

Although most of the song's lyrics are primarily written in Hindi with some English, "Dhoom Again" is almost entirely in English. Chopra suggested Vishal Dadlani to sing the track, to give an international feel. The song "Crazy Kiya Re" was described as the composer's favorite, as he enjoyed the recording process. The soundtrack was recorded at YRF Studios and Spectral Harmony Studios in Mumbai and was mixed in London in 5.1 Surround Sound.

== Release ==
The soundtrack was released through YRF Music on 19 October 2006. The film's soundtrack is the first in Indian cinema to be released in DVD-Audio in addition to other audio formats.

== Reception ==
Gaurav Malani of IndiaFM wrote: "Despite being distinctly different from each other, there is a certain common vibe amongst all the tracks of Dhoom 2 by which you can identify them amongst a lot." A reviewer based at Hindustan Times wrote "Pritam, who has of late given some hummable scores in Gangster and Bas Ek Pal, fails to impress this time." Karthik Srinivasan of Milliblog wrote "The original Dhoom didn't boast of great music...but it grew with the racy movie. Yash Raj Films may be expecting an encore here."

Rajesh Karkera of Rediff.com wrote "The soundtrack didn't open to rave reviews, but after seeing the songs on screen, they come alive, and are bound to become a hit." Taran Adarsh of Bollywood Hungama wrote "Pritam's music is fair. Barring the 'Krazy Kiya Re' track and the title track [filmed on Hrithik], the score is outright mediocre. However, the saving grace is the vibrant and energetic picturization, which takes the songs to another level [...] Salim-Sulaiman's background score is highly effective."

According to the Indian trade website Box Office India, with around 2 million units sold, the film's soundtrack was the year's third highest-selling.

== Track listing ==
=== Hindi ===
No.	Title	Lyrics	Singer(s)	Length
1.	"Crazy Kiya Re"	Sameer	Sunidhi Chauhan, Ravi Khote	04:54
2.	"Touch Me"	Sameer	KK, Alisha Chinai	05:17
3.	"My Name Is Ali"	Sameer	Sonu Nigam, Bipasha Basu	04:34
4.	"Dil Laga Na"	Sameer	Sukhbir, Soham Chakraborty, Jolly Mukherjee, Mahalakshmi Iyer, Suzanne D'Mello	05:04
5.	"Dhoom Again"	Asif Ali Baig	Vishal Dadlani, Dominique Cerejo	05:02
6.	"Crazy Kiya Re" (Remix)	Sameer	Sunidhi Chauhan	03:57
Total length:				30:48

=== Tamil ===
No.	Title	Lyrics	Singer(s)	Length
1.	"Crazy Aanene"	Piraisoodan	Sunidhi Chauhan	04:55
2.	"Touch Me"	Piraisoodan	Gayatri Ganjawala, Kunal Ganjawala	05:19
3.	"My Name Is Ali"	Piraisoodan	Bipasha Basu, Javed Ali	04:35
4.	"Kadal Kadal Thedi"	Piraisoodan	Gopal Rao, Jolly Mukherjee, Mahalakshmi Iyer, Suzanne D'Mello, Vijay Prakash	05:11
5.	"Dhoom Again"	Asif Ali Baig	Vishal Dadlani, Dominique Cerejo	05:02
6.	"Crazy" (Remix)	Piraisoodan	Sunidhi Chauhan	03:56
Total length:				31:00

=== Telugu ===
No.	Title	Lyrics	Singer(s)	Length
1.	"Crazy Ayyane"	Rajshri Sudhakar	Sunidhi Chauhan	04:55
2.	"Touch Me"	Rajshri Sudhakar	Gayatri Ganjawala, Kunal Ganjawala	05:19
3.	"My Name Is Ali"	Rajshri Sudhakar	Bipasha Basu, Javed Ali	04:35
4.	"Rajukunna Segalalona"	Rajshri Sudhakar	Gopal Rao, Jolly Mukherjee, Mahalakshmi Iyer, Suzanne D'Mello, Vijay Prakash	05:11
5.	"Dhoom Again"	Asif Ali Baig	Vishal Dadlani, Dominique Cerejo	05:02
6.	"Crazy" (Remix)	Rajshri Sudhakar	Sunidhi Chauhan	03:56
Total length:				31:00

== Accolades ==
Award (Note: Awards, festivals and organizations are in alphabetical order.)	Date of ceremony (Note: Date is linked to the article about the awards held that year, wherever possible.)	Category	Recipient(s)	Result	Ref.
Bollywood Movie Awards	26 May 2007	Best Music Director	Pritam	Won	
Filmfare Awards	17 February 2007	Best Music Director	Pritam	Nominated	
Filmfare Awards	17 February 2007	Best Background Score	Salim–Sulaiman	Nominated	
International Indian Film Academy Awards	7–9 June 2007	Best Music Director	Shankar–Ehsaan–Loy	Nominated	
International Indian Film Academy Awards	7–9 June 2007	Best Lyricist	Sameer for "Crazy Kiya Re"	Nominated	
International Indian Film Academy Awards	7–9 June 2007	Best Female Playback Singer	Sunidhi Chauhan for "Crazy Kiya Re"	Nominated	
