= Dhoom 3 =

2013 Indian film by Vijay Krishna Acharya

- Theatrical release poster
- Directed by: Vijay Krishna Acharya
- Written by: Vijay Krishna Acharya
- Story by: Aditya Chopra; Vijay Krishna Acharya
- Produced by: Aditya Chopra
- Starring: Aamir Khan; Abhishek Bachchan; Uday Chopra; Jackie Shroff; Katrina Kaif
- Cinematography: Sudeep Chatterjee
- Edited by: Ritesh Soni
- Music by: Score: Julius Packiam; Songs: Pritam
- Production company: Yash Raj Films
- Distributed by: Yash Raj Films
- Release date: 20 December 2013
- Running time: 172 minutes
- Country: India
- Language: Hindi
- Budget: ₹100 crore
- Box office: est. ₹556.74 crore

Dhoom 3 (transl. Blast 3), stylised as Dhoom: 3, is a 2013 Indian Hindi-language action thriller film written and directed by Vijay Krishna Acharya and produced by Aditya Chopra, who co-wrote the story. The film, which is the third installment of Dhoom series, stars Aamir Khan as the anti-hero with Abhishek Bachchan and Uday Chopra reprising their roles as protagonists while Jackie Shroff and Katrina Kaif play supporting roles. Dhoom 3 marks Uday's final film appearance to date.

Dhoom 3 was released on 20 December 2013. It was the first Hindi film to be released in IMAX; the film also used Dolby Atmos surround sound.

Dhoom 3 received mixed reviews from critics and grossed ₹400 crore (US$68.26 million) worldwide in just ten days, to become the highest-grossing Indian film of all time at that time, before becoming the first Indian film to cross ₹500 crore (US$85.33 million). It eventually grossed worldwide gross of ₹556.74–558.42 crore. The film was screened during the 2014 International Film Festival of India in the Celebrating Dance in Indian Cinema section.

== Plot ==
In 1990, Iqbal Haroon Khan, who owns The Great Indian Circus in Illinois, is ordered by the Western Bank of Chicago to close down the circus as he cannot repay his loan. Dejected, Iqbal commits suicide in front of his young son Sahir Iqbal Khan and the officials, including Chairman Warren Anderson.

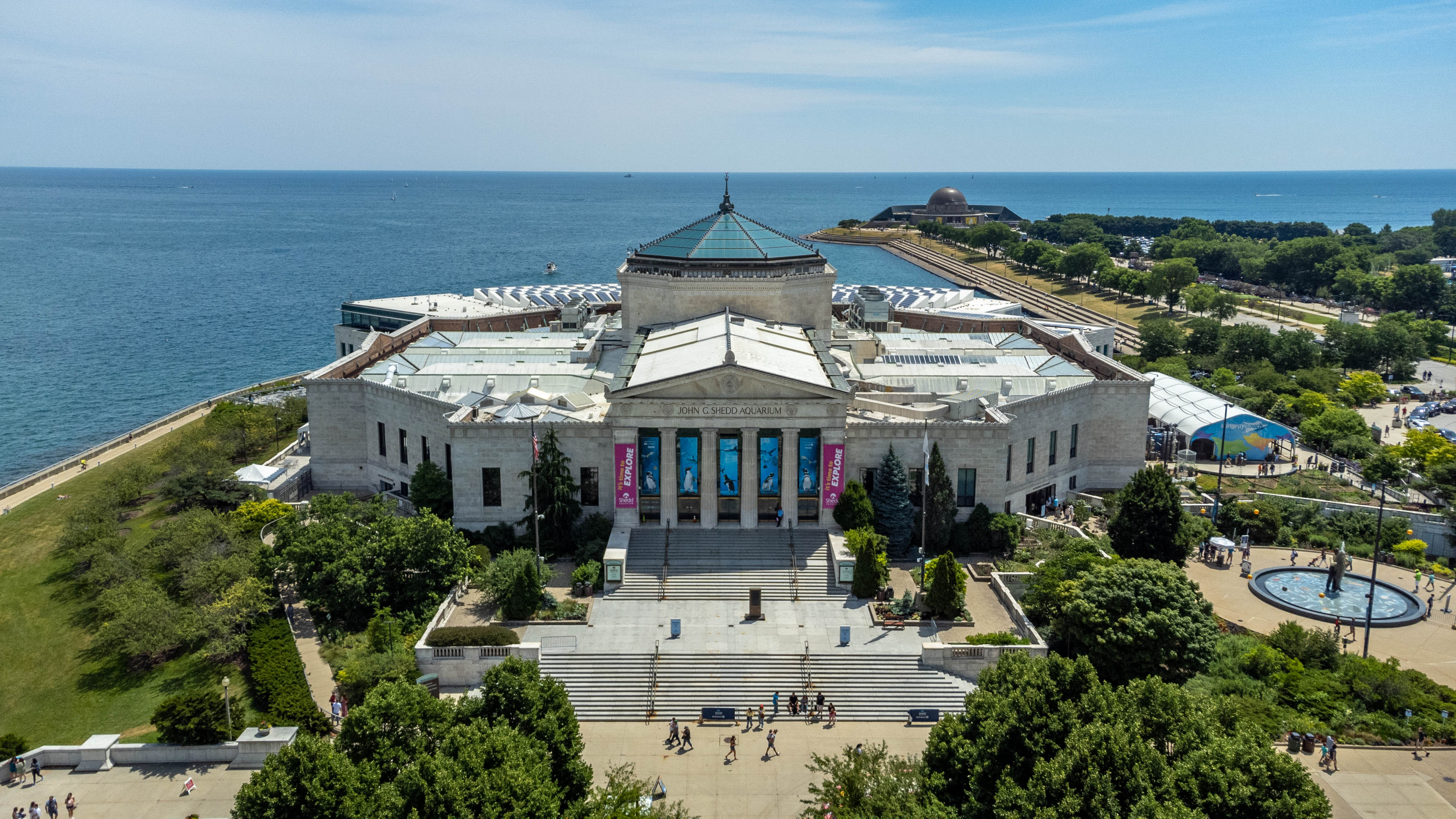
Exterior scenes of the circus building actually show the Shedd Aquarium

In 2013, Sahir robs various branches of the Western Bank of Chicago as revenge. Despite all efforts of law enforcement, the Chicago Police are unable to capture him. Detective Victoria calls A.C.P Jai Dixit and Sub Inspector Ali Akbar Fateh Khan for help. Sahir restarts The Great Indian Circus and hires Aaliya Hussain as an acrobat. Sahir poses as an informant for Jai and manages to gather information on the bank while providing Jai with a false lead to follow. Eventually, Sahir robs the bank, but Jai shoots him in the left shoulder before he disappears.

At The Great Indian Circus's grand premiere, Sahir performs a teleportation trick in which he disappears and reappears in a different place. The show becomes a success. After the show, Jai, Ali, and the police surround him. When Sahir is examined, there is no gunshot wound on his body. It is then revealed that Sahir has an autistic twin brother, Samar Iqbal Khan, who helps him pull off the tricks and robberies and is the one who sustained the gunshot wound. Jai is fired from the case but is encouraged by Ali to prove Sahir guilty by going rogue.

Jai finds out about Samar, who is kept in seclusion by Sahir and is allowed outdoors once a week. Jai manages to befriend him during this time, intending to use him to catch Sahir. Samar falls in love with Aaliya, while Sahir finds out about Jai using his brother. Sahir tricks Jai and almost kills him, but Ali saves him. Sahir and Samar successfully pull off their final bank heist, but are cornered at a dam on their way out of town. Samar hesitates to run when Aaliya appears, begging him to stop. Sahir pretends to surrender to Jai, asking him to spare Samar; when Jai agrees, Sahir attempts to jump off the dam- but Samar grabs Sahir's hand, and he begs Samar to let him go, saying Samar can live freely with Aaliya. Samar declares that they were born together and should die together, and lets go of his hand, and the twins fall to their deaths. In the aftermath, Western Bank of Chicago is shut down due to the heists, while Aaliya takes over The Great Indian Circus and performs in Samar's memory.

== Cast ==
- Aamir Khan in dual roles as
  - Sahir Khan, Samar's twin brother
  - Samar Khan, Sahir's twin brother
    - Siddharth Nigam as young Sahir and Samar
- Abhishek Bachchan as A.C.P Jai Dixit, Mumbai Crime Branch
- Uday Chopra as Sub Inspector Ali Akbar Fateh Khan
- Jackie Shroff as Iqbal Haroon Khan, Sahir and Samar's father
- Katrina Kaif as Aaliya Hussain, Samar's love interest
- Tabrett Bethell as Victoria Williams
- Andrew Bicknell as Warren Anderson
- Vikas Shrivastav as Tamilian Don

== Production ==
=== Development ===
Prior to principal photography, Dhoom 3 enjoyed widespread media coverage due to the tremendous box office successes of previous instalments Dhoom 2 and Dhoom as well as the confirmation of Aamir Khan as the film's lead antagonist, thereby creating anticipation amongst the audience and media. On 2 January 2011, producer Aditya Chopra confirmed that the third instalment of the Dhoom series would begin principal photography by the end of 2011. Initially, Chopra and Khan wanted to release the film on Christmas of 2012, but the plan was scrapped in favour of an early release date in 2013, mainly due to a forecast that a Christmas release would force a rushed post-production schedule, which was considered unfavorable given the high degree of technicality required for the film. Around ₹1.25 billion (US$21.33 million) was spent just on the production side of Dhoom 3.

Reportedly, Chopra wanted to make the film in 3D after observing the successes of previous Bollywood films released in this format. However, Khan opined that the 3D technology needed expertise and was unsure of the outcome of its utilisation by the director. As of September 2012, YRF Studios had not announced the production of the film in 3D.

=== Casting ===
Aamir Khan joined the cast as the lead antagonist after he enjoyed hearing the script, while Abhishek Bachchan and Uday Chopra were confirmed to reprise their roles as Jai Dixit and Ali Akbar respectively. Khan learned ballet aerobatics and the French technique of parkour, a method of movement focused on negotiating obstacles with speed and efficiency, while Katrina Kaif took paragliding training and singing lessons. Bachchan reportedly lost nine kilos of weight to prepare for his role in the film. Rimi Sen, who played Jai's wife Sweety in the previous instalments of the series, was not approached to reprise the part. However, she stated that she would not have agreed even if offered.

Unlike the first two Dhoom films directed by Sanjay Gadhvi, Vijay Krishna Acharya, the writer of all three instalments of Dhoom, was roped in to direct Dhoom 3; Gadhvi had, however, himself clarified that he wanted to get involved with films outside the franchise and thus chose not to direct the third film, instead helming Kidnap (2008) for Shree Ashtavinayak Cine Vision Limited and Ajab Gazabb Love (2012) for Pooja Entertainment over the course of Dhoom 3's development. Acharya, in the meantime, had earlier made his directorial debut with the Yash Raj Films production Tashan (2008). Olliver Keller was signed to direct the stunt scenes.

Khan stated in an interview that his role in Dhoom 3 is the toughest role so far in his life. The action scenes were directed by Conrad Palmisano and Sham Kaushal. In an interview with IANS, Bachchan expressed how every character of Dhoom 3 is significant: "...Dhoom is my film and I am the hero. Nobody can take that away from me. You can be the biggest or the smallest star but Dhoom is about Jai and Ali. It is as simple as that. If the characters of Jai and Ali are not there in Dhoom, the film won't be there."

On 23 September 2013, three months before the actual release of the film, DNA and other media news publications revealed that Khan could play a double role in Dhoom 3, but they did not confirm it. The dual role was only confirmed at the release of the film. This made Dhoom 3 the first and currently the only film in the series in which the antagonist has a double role. However, this was not the first time the series featured a double role, since Bipasha Basu had a double role in Dhoom 2 as Shonali and Monali, but they did not share the same screen space, unlike Khan's characters. Neil Nitin Mukesh and Kamal Haasan were also speculated to appear, but this was proven to be false.

=== Filming ===
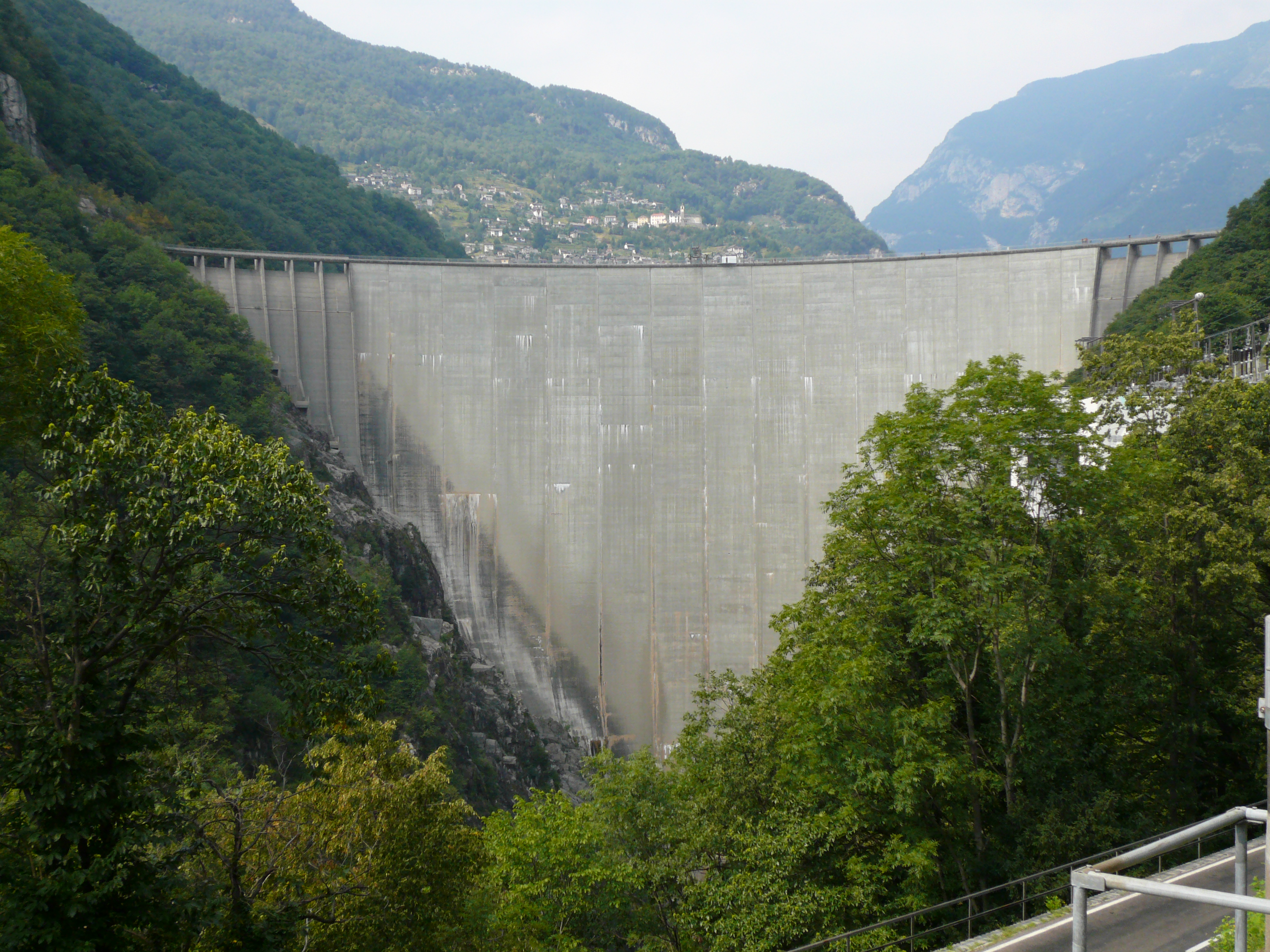
Contra Dam in Switzerland, where the climax of the film was shot

Filming was scheduled to commence from November 2011, with scenes involving Bachchan and Uday being shot first, but the former was off on a paternity leave, causing the shoot to be postponed to January 2012. The schedule was then pushed to June because of Khan's prior commitments to his TV show Satyamev Jayate; in June, the filming schedule was further postponed for a month because Khan wanted to prepare himself for his role of a gymnast. Khan also wanted to concentrate on the marketing and promotion of his then-upcoming film Talaash, a co-production he also headlined. Without any further delays, filming commenced with Jackie Shroff and Siddharth Nigam, the child actor playing child Sahir, on 8 June 2012 at the YRF Studios in Mumbai.

Khan joined the crew in July 2012, filming for five days at Yash Raj Studios and further continued to shoot in Chicago and other parts of the United States. He, Bachchan and Uday flew to the US on 4 August 2012 to complete a three-month schedule. On arrival in India in December 2012, Bachchan stated that fifty percent of filming was complete and would again resume in Mumbai.

In the second week of March 2013, it was reported that the crew had departed for Zurich and Ticino, Switzerland to film the climax. Filming finally wrapped up on 14 September 2013 at a suburban studio in Mumbai.

The climactic scene in Dhoom 3 was shot at the famous arch dam, Contra Dam (commonly known as the Verzasca Dam) in Ticino, Switzerland. It became a popular bungee jumping venue after a James Bond stuntman jumped off it in the opening scene of the 1995 film GoldenEye.

== Music ==
It was announced that the composer of Dhoom and Dhoom 2; Pritam, would return once again to compose the music of the third instalment. Earlier reports suggested that Shefali Alvares had been roped to sing the Dhoom title track, but this turned out to be a rumour. Aamir said in a statement that the title track "Dhoom Machale Dhoom" is dedicated to Sachin Tendulkar who was then playing his 200th and final test match at the Wankhede Stadium.

== Release ==
In November 2013, Aditya Chopra sent out a message to movie exhibitors all over the country to "Go digital or miss Dhoom 3." In detailed statements, he claimed, "Release of movies through digital and UFO digital cinema prevents piracy as the prints are water-marked and finger-printed and can be traced back. It is believed that films are usually copied for piracy when the reels are being transported to theatres in the country and abroad. Digital cinema curbs piracy as the 'en route' content leakage is eliminated. It also makes sense economically as a producer saves a lot of printing costs. Apart from that, encrypting the content protects the copyrights of the producers and distributors. Digital prints prevent duplication of prints and help by diverting funds back to the cinemas."

IMAX Corporation and Yash Raj Films announced that Dhoom:3 would be the first Indian local language production to be released in the IMAX format. The film was digitally remastered in the IMAX format with proprietary IMAX DMR (Digital Re-mastering) technology and was released in IMAX theatres across India and selective global locations. Dhoom 3 was released with cinema sound technology Dolby Atmos. The film received a native Atmos mix at YRF Studios. Dhoom 3 was given a 12A certificate by the British Board of Film Certification for Moderate Violence 12 December 2013, for Moderate violence. The film was released across 4500 screens in India (inclusive of Tamil and Telugu versions) along with 750 screens overseas. Dhoom 3 had a release on 250 screens in West Bengal. The maximum ticket price of the IMAX version of Dhoom 3 was ₹900 (US$15) in India. Cinépolis Pune set a unique record by hosting 54 shows of Dhoom 3 on 20 December 2013. Dhoom 3 was also released in non-traditional overseas markets like Egypt, Peru, Germany and Malaysia. Dhoom 3 was slated to release in China on 25 July 2014. This was to be the widest release ever for an Indian film in China, with 2000 screens across 400 cities.

== Marketing ==
=== Pre-release ===
"We believe that less is more for this film and even curiosity will be there"

— Aamir Khan, on the promotional policy adopted by the makers.

The title logo of the film was released in a video that credited the main roles of the film. The score for the video constituted paced beats and electric guitars and was released on Christmas 2012 through Yash Raj Film's official YouTube channel, confirming the film for a Christmas 2013 release. The first working as well as promotional poster was also released nearly a year prior. In August 2013, YRF released a motion poster of the film on YouTube, revealing the first look. It featured Aamir Khan with a hidden visage standing inside a tall building, looking at helicopters in the air through a glass window. A voiceover reveals that the Chicago police force is searching for a fugitive biker who vanished before he could be caught. The satellite rights of Dhoom 3 were sold at a record price of ₹750 million (US$12.8 million). The first teaser of Dhoom 3 was released on 5 September 2013 at 12 noon IST. The teaser achieved 6 million views on YouTube within 6 days, subsequently receiving 12 million views in 20 days. The film's teaser was also attached with the film Shuddh Desi Romance. On 25 October, Yash Raj Films launched a game based on the film for Windows Phones. Developed by 99Games Online (a subsidiary of Robosoft mobile games), the 3D game was set against the backdrop of Chicago and opens with a heist by the character played by Aamir Khan. Within 20 days of its launch, the game witnessed over 1 million downloads on the Windows Phone Marketplace and Nokia Store. The Android, iOS and Blackberry 10 version of the game was launched on 19 November 2013. Dhoom: 3 The Game crossed five million downloads across all platforms in less than seven weeks of its launch on 19 November 2013. Dhoom:3 mobile game surpassed 10 million downloads within three months since its release.

The theatrical trailer was released in IMAX format on 30 October 2013 as well as on YouTube. PVR Cinemas began advance booking for selected shows of the film same day the trailer had released, witnessing sales of just under ₹20 million (US$341,309.74) until 17 December 2013.

Aamir Khan also promoted Dhoom 3 on the sets of Kaun Banega Crorepati. The publicity campaign included tie-ins with over 17 leading brands including Mattel (manufacture of limited edition action figures, model cars and bikes), Gulf Oil, CEAT, Bombay Dyeing, Archies for stationery and the LINE social messaging application, along with 183 other brands. A marketing pact was also made with BMW Motorrad, which has revealed that its S1000RR and K1300R sport bikes would feature in the film. A special screening of Dhoom 3 was held at Yash Raj Studios on 19 December 2013. A special screening of Dhoom 3 that was attended by Raj Thackeray was organised on 22 December 2013.

=== Post-release ===
After the film's performance at the box office, Amul paid tribute to the film in one of its creative advertisement campaign posters. The poster features the words "Dhoom Tea" in the same typography style as the film's logo is with a caption "Chased everyday". "The Dhoom Anthem" featuring Saba Azad was released by Yashraj Films on 26 December 2013. A Spanish version of "Dhoom Machale" song sung by Mia Mont was released by Yashraj Films on 4 January 2014. In June 2014, 99GamesOnline launched the sequel to 'Dhoom: 3 The Game' mobile game, title as "Dhoom:3 Jet Speed".

== Box office ==
Dhoom 3 grossed over ₹200 crore (US$34.13 million) worldwide in its first three days, including its Tamil and Telugu versions. The film grossed ₹400 crore (US$68.26 million) worldwide in just ten days, to become the highest-grossing Indian film of all time. On 6 January 2014, Yash Raj Films issued a statement that Dhoom 3 is officially the first Indian film to earn ₹500 crore (US$85.33 million) worldwide. The film's final worldwide gross was ₹589.2 crore (US$101 million), including ₹372 crore (US$64 million) in India and US$35.6 million (₹217.2 crore) overseas.

=== Domestic ===
Dhoom 3 worldwide collections breakdown
Territories	Collections breakdown
India	Domestic gross — ₹372 crore (US$64 million)
India	Hindi version net — ₹261 crore
India	Tamil & Telugu versions net — ₹11.5 crore
India	Distributor share — ₹140 crore
India	Entertainment tax — ₹85.3 crore
Overseas	Overseas gross — US$35.6 million (₹217.2 crore)
Overseas	United States and Canada — US$8,060,862
Overseas	China — ₹24 crore (US$3.93 million)
Worldwide	₹589.2 crore (US$101 million)

According to several trade publications, Dhoom 3 opened to an overwhelming response at the domestic box office. Box Office India stated that the film had an extraordinary opening, recording 75% occupancy in multiplexes and 90–100% occupancy in single screens.

The opening day collection stood at ₹30.9 crore from the Hindi version, while the dubbed Tamil and Telugu versions together earned ₹2.8 crore. The total opening day collection of the film broke the records of highest non-holiday opening and highest single day previously held by Yeh Jawaani Hai Deewani and Krrish 3 respectively. On the second day of its release, it went on to collect ₹29.5 crore, setting new records in several circuits. Dhoom 3 (Hindi) nett. grossed ₹35 crore on its third day to take Hindi version total to about ₹95.8 crore in the first weekend and further ₹7 crore in Tamil and Telugu which took the all language figure to ₹102 crore, making it the fastest film to reach ₹100 crore in India. The film grossed ₹20 crore on its first Monday, ₹21 crore on the first Tuesday, ₹24 crore on first Wednesday and ₹14 crore on first Thursday, taking the first week total to nearly ₹174 crore for its Hindi version. The film set new first week records in all circuits and became the highest grossing film in the East Punjab circuit at the end of its first week. Dhoom 3 grossed ₹10 crore from its Tamil and Telugu versions to take its all language total to ₹183 crore in first week.

The film collected ₹100 million on second Friday, ₹115 million on second Saturday, ₹170 million on second Sunday, ₹60 million on second Monday, ₹70 million on second Tuesday, ₹105 million on second Wednesday and ₹40 million on second Thursday to take its Hindi-version total to ₹2.39 billion in two weeks. Dhoom 3 set a new record for second week collections with ₹648 million, beating four-year-long record of ₹562 million of 3 Idiots.

The film collected around ₹12 crore on its third weekend and ₹2 crore on its third Monday to take its Hindi version total to ₹252 crore in 18 days. Dhoom 3 set new records in all territories across the globe apart from Mumbai, the biggest circuit. It grossed around ₹17.3 crore in its third week taking the three-week Hindi version total to around ₹256 crore. The Hindi version had a theatrical run for 9 weeks with a final domestic nett of ₹261 crore. Dhoom 3 earned about ₹12.5 crore from its Tamil and Telugu versions. Of its collections, ₹97 crore nett was from single screens in India. Dhoom 3 broke all records of 3 Idiots in domestic market, except Mumbai territory.

=== Overseas ===
Dhoom 3 grossed US$10.32 million in its first weekend, setting new records for an Indian film in almost all territories. Dhoom 3 grossed ₹107 crore (US$18.26 million) total in overseas markets. Dhoom 3 became the highest-grossing Indian film ever in the US/Canada, UK, Gulf, Australia and New Zealand. The film grossed over £2 million ($3.13 million) in the United Kingdom in 11 days, and went on to gross £2,708,046 ($4,233,567) to become highest-grossing Hindi film in the UK. It also became the UK's highest-grossing foreign-language film of 2013, highest-grossing foreign-language Indian film of all time, and tenth highest-grossing foreign-language film of all time. The film collected $3,423,508 (₹204.9 million) in its first weekend in the United States and Canada. Dhoom 3 collected US$20.5 million internationally in ten days. Dhoom 3 eventually grossed US$28 million in international markets in its lifetime overseas theatrical run and surpassed the record of 3 Idiots to become the highest grossing Bollywood film in international markets.

Dhoom 3 also set a new opening record in Pakistan, beating the previous record held by Pakistani film Waar. Dhoom 3 eventually became the highest grossing Bollywood film in Pakistan with overall gross of US$1.95 million (INR 121 million, PKR 245 million). Dhoom 3 became the first film to gross Rs 60 million at the box office in Nepal, as the local filmmakers of Nepal had to delay the release of their own films for three weeks due to the strong performance of Dhoom 3 there. Dhoom 3 had the biggest opening ever for any Indian film in Turkey, when it released there in June 2014.

==== China ====
The film was released in China on 25 July 2014, 8 months after the release of the film in India and other overseas markets. Dhoom 3 reportedly had the widest release in China for a Bollywood film in more than three decades. The film opened in 2,000 screens in 400 Chinese cities, upon release it entered the Chinese top 10 charts at number 9 and grossed $1.35 million for the three-day weekend, beating the local Chinese romance No Zuo No Die.

=== Records ===
Indian film box office records set by Dhoom 3 since its release
Box office record	Record details	Previous record holder	Ref.
Number of screens (Domestic)	4,500 screens	Chennai Express (2013, 3,700 screens)	
Number of screens (International)	906 screens	Chennai Express (2013, 700 screens)	
Biggest non-holiday opening day (Domestic)	₹335,000,000	Yeh Jawaani Hai Deewani (2013, ₹19,81,00,000)	
Highest single day (Domestic)	₹350,000,000	Krrish 3 (2013, ₹31,50,00,000)	
Opening weekend nett (Domestic)	₹1,020,000,000	Chennai Express (2013, ₹89,42,00,000)	
Opening weekend gross (International)	US$15.17 million	Chennai Express (2013, US$7.1 million)	
Worldwide opening weekend	₹2 billion (US$34.13 million)	Chennai Express (2013, ₹1.6 billion)	
First week nett (India)	₹1.83 billion (US$31.23 million)	Chennai Express (2013, ₹1.39 billion)	
Second weekend nett (India)	₹380 million (US$6.48 million)	3 Idiots (2009, ₹330 million)	
Second week nett (India)	₹650 million (US$11.09 million)	3 Idiots (2009, ₹562 million)	
Lifetime nett. gross (India)	₹2.84 billion (US$48.47 million)	Chennai Express (2013, ₹2.08 billion)	
Distributor share (Domestic)	₹1.38 billion (US$23.55 million)	Chennai Express (₹1.15 billion)	
Overseas Gross	US$31.5 million	3 Idiots (US$25.4 million)	
Worldwide gross	₹540 crore (US$92.15 million)	Chennai Express (₹422 crore)	
Highest gross (North America)	$8,090,250 [Rs 505.5 million]	3 Idiots (2009, $6,540,000)	
Highest gross (UK)	£2,710,319 [Rs 277.8 million]	My Name is Khan (2010, £2,630,000)	
Highest gross (U.A.E-G.C.C)	$6,250,000 [Rs 409.8 million]	3 Idiots (2009, $3,150,000)	
Highest gross (Australia)	A$1,733,924 [Rs 96.3 million]	3 Idiots (2009, A$1,100,000)	
Highest gross (New Zealand)	NZ$530,911 [Rs 27.2 million]	Housefull 2 (2012, NZ$258,000 )	
Days to reach ₹1 billion (US$17.07 million) nett (Domestic)	3 days	Chennai Express (4 days)	
Days to reach ₹2 billion (US$34.13 million) nett (Domestic)	10 days	Chennai Express (21 days)	

== Reception ==
Review aggregator Rotten Tomatoes gives the film a score of 67% based on reviews from 21 critics, with a rating average of 6.6/10.

=== India ===
Domestically, Dhoom 3 received mostly positive reviews from critics. Taran Adarsh of Bollywood Hungama rated the film 4.5 out of 5 stars and said, "On the whole, DHOOM-3 is one solid entertainer loaded with attitude and star power that will leave fans of the series salivating for more." The Daily Bhaskar also rated it 4.5 out of 5 stars. While praising the performance of Khan, the newspaper wrote "The whole film rests on Khan's shoulders, and it won't be an overestimation to say that he is strong enough to hold the three hours all by himself." Srijana Mitra Das of the Times of India gave the film 4 out of 5 stars. Especially praising the actors' performances, she wrote, "Dhoom 3 makes you laugh, gasp – even sniffle". Aparna Mudi of Zee News gave the film 4 out of 5 stars and remarked "Dhoom 3 manages to deliver a typically Bollywood revenge saga in a modern way." Sarita A Tanwar of Daily News and Analysis also gave it 4 stars and commented, "Welcome to the world of jaw-dropping action and stunts never seen before on Hindi screen. Dhoom 3 redefines the word 'entertainment' in the grandest way possible." Saibal Chatterjee of NDTV, on the other hand, gave it 3 out of 5 stars and noted that "Dhoom: 3 is a high-voltage action flick that relies squarely on known methods of the genre". Sukanya Verma of Rediff.com gave it 3 out of 5 stars and wrote, "Dhoom 3 continues the tradition of extravagance in adventure and expenditure by roping in the fastidious Aamir Khan as its latest star antagonist". Rachit Gupta of Filmfare rated it 3 out of 5 stars; though he labelled it a "slick looking film", he felt "the force driving them, the story, teeters on abysmal points". Anupama Chopra of the Hindustan Times gave the film 3 stars and wrote, "The third installment...is bigger and more plot-heavy than the first two." The Indo-Asian News Service review, syndicated by Business Standard, also gave it 3 stars, writing, "Dhoom 3 is an intriguing piece of work... slender supple smart and subtle...and yet helmed by a central performance that screams for attention."

Dhoom 3 also received negative reviews as well. Rajeev Masand of CNN-IBN gave the film 2.5 out of 5 stars and stated "Dhoom 3 is let down by a convenient script and its inability to deliver solid entertainment". He described the film as a "sloppily scripted sandwich of hammy acting and cheesy dialogue" that lacked the "thrills" of the previous films. Raja Sen of Rediff gave it 1.5 out of 5 stars. Criticizing the villain's motivations and the "yawn-worthy chase scenes" that were "both pointless and badly edited", he deemed Dhoom 3 "a children's film made for children who've never seen a film". Shubhra Gupta of Indian Express gave the film 2 stars out of 5. She praised the "superb cinematography, great-looking sets, expansive foreign locations", however she also found the film to be "a victim of both a crying lack of imagination and franchise fatigue". Gupta also felt that Khan lacked the "sexy-badness" required for the villain, and noted Kaif's minimal role. Rohit Khilnani of India Today heavily criticised Dhoom 3 and gave it 2 stars out of 5, calling it "full of loopholes, over-the-top acting and an overdose of action that doesn't fit well all the time". He found that the film's only redeeming factor was that it was "a visual treat" due to its exotic locales and special effects. Rafay Mahmood of The Express Tribune rated the film as 1.5 out of 5, noting the "overdose of one-liners", lack of "a properly connected cause-and-effect chain", and the "over-the-top action sequences" that "build-up to nothing dramatically significant". He, in particular, criticised the actors' performances. Mahmood called Kaif "eye candy" with little dialogue, and felt Khan gave "perhaps the worst performance of his career".

=== International ===
Meanwhile, the film garnered praise from foreign film critics.

David Chute of Variety liked the camera work, action, stunts, and Aamir's performance: "Acharya's camera seems to be dancing – and swooning – along with the performers... High-flying acrobatics and a standout Aamir Khan performance dominate the third entry in Bollywood's biggest action franchise." According to Bill Stamets of Chicago Sun-Times, "Dhoom:3 is crowd-pleasing populist fare" that "entertains as a spectacle of chases, bank capers, magic acts and song-and-dance numbers". A number of critics noted that Dhoom 3 has several similarities with Christopher Nolan's films The Prestige and The Dark Knight.

== Awards and nominations ==
Awards and nominations for Dhoom 3
Award	Date announced	Category	Recipient	Result	Ref.
Life OK Screen Awards	8 January 2014	Best Actor (Male)	Aamir Khan	Nominated	
Life OK Screen Awards	8 January 2014	Popular Choice (Male)	Aamir Khan	Nominated	
Life OK Screen Awards	8 January 2014	Popular Choice (Female)	Katrina Kaif	Nominated	
Life OK Screen Awards	8 January 2014	Best Actor in a Comic Role (Male/Female)	Uday Chopra	Nominated	
Life OK Screen Awards	8 January 2014	Best Child Artist	Siddharth Nigam	Nominated	
Life OK Screen Awards	8 January 2014	Best Cinematography	Sudeep Chatterjee	Nominated	
Life OK Screen Awards	8 January 2014	Best Action	Mohan Conrad E. Palmisano & Sham Kaushal	Nominated	
Life OK Screen Awards	8 January 2014	Best Costume	Anaita Shroff, Rushi Sharma, and Manoshi Nath	Nominated	
Life OK Screen Awards	8 January 2014	Best Sound Design	Ganesh Gangadharan	Nominated	
Life OK Screen Awards	8 January 2014	Best Production Design	Acropolis – Sumit Basu, Snigdha Basu, Rajnish Hedao	Nominated	
Life OK Screen Awards	8 January 2014	Best Special Effects	Tata Elxsi - VCL	Nominated	
Life OK Screen Awards	8 January 2014	Best Choreography	Vaibhavi Merchant	Nominated	
ETC Bollywood Business Awards	18 January 2014	Most Profitable Actor	Aamir Khan	Won	
ETC Bollywood Business Awards	18 January 2014	Highest Grossing Actor (Male)	Aamir Khan	Won	
ETC Bollywood Business Awards	18 January 2014	Highest Single day collection	Dhoom 3	Won	
ETC Bollywood Business Awards	18 January 2014	Most Popular Trailer	Dhoom 3	Won	
ETC Bollywood Business Awards	18 January 2014	Highest Grossing Banner	Yashraj Films	Won	
Filmfare Awards	24 January 2014	Visual Effects	Tata Elxsi	Won	
Star Guild Awards	16 January 2014	Best Choreography	Vaibhavi Merchant	Nominated	
Star Guild Awards	16 January 2014	Best Playback Singer (Male)	Siddharth Mahadevan	Nominated	
Zee Cine Awards	31 January 2014	Best Actor-Male	Aamir Khan	Nominated	
Zee Cine Awards	31 January 2014	Best Film	Dhoom 3	Nominated	
Zee Cine Awards	31 January 2014	Best Actor In A Supporting Role – Male	Abhishek Bachchan	Nominated	
Zee Cine Awards	31 January 2014	Best Screenplay	Vijay Krishna Acharya	Nominated	
Zee Cine Awards	31 January 2014	Best Visual Effects	Dhoom 3	Nominated	
Zee Cine Awards	31 January 2014	Best Background Score	Julius Packiam	Nominated	
Zee Cine Awards	31 January 2014	Best Sound Design	Ganesh Gangadharan	Nominated	
Zee Cine Awards	31 January 2014	Best Production Design	Snigdha Basu, Sumit Basu, Rajnish Hedao	Nominated	
Zee Cine Awards	31 January 2014	Best Action	Sham Kaushal, Conrad Palmisano	Won	
Zee Cine Awards	31 January 2014	Best Cinematography	Sudeep Chatterjee	Nominated	
Zee Cine Awards	31 January 2014	Best Editing	Ritesh Soni	Nominated	
Zee Cine Awards	31 January 2014	Best Choreography	Vaibhavi Merchant	Nominated	
IIFA Awards	19 February 2014	Best Film	Dhoom 3	Nominated	

Negative awards and nominations
Award	Date announced	Category	Recipient	Result	Ref.
Golden Kela Awards	30 March 2014	Worst Film	Dhoom 3	Nominated	
Golden Kela Awards	30 March 2014	Worst Sequel/Remake	Dhoom 3	Nominated	
Golden Kela Awards	30 March 2014	Baawra Ho Gaya Hai Ke	Aamir Khan	Won	
Ghanta Awards	10 February 2014	Worst Supporting Actor	Abhishek Bachchan	Nominated	
Ghanta Awards	10 February 2014	Worst Couple	Aamir-Aamir-Katrina	Nominated	
Ghanta Awards	10 February 2014	Role/Skill Fail	Aamir Khan	Nominated	
Ghanta Awards	10 February 2014	WTF Was That	Bike/Jet Ski/Transformer	Nominated	

The film has garnered the inaugural Telstra People's Choice Award at the 2014 Indian Film Festival of Melbourne.

== See also ==
- Dhoom (film series)
- List of Bollywood films of 2013
- Bollywood 100 Crore Club
- List of highest-grossing Bollywood films
- List of Bollywood highest-grossing films in overseas markets
