= Yash Raj Films =

Indian film studio

- Official logo
- Trade name: YRF Music
- Type: Privately held company
- Founded: 1970; 56 years ago
- Founder: Yash Chopra
- Headquarters: Mumbai, India
- Key people: Aditya Chopra (Chairman & MD); Akshaye Widhani (CEO)
- Products: Films released
- Divisions: Production; Distribution; Studio; Marketing; Merchandising; Licensing; Home Video; Music; Digital; Talent; Brand Partnerships; Communications; Technical; Visual Effects; YRF Entertainment
- Subsidiaries: YRF Studios; YRF Distributors; YFX; YRF Entertainment; YRF Spy Universe; YRF Home Entertainment; YRF Music; Y-Films; YRF Television; YRF Digital; YRF Talent; Raah Records
- Website: www.yashrajfilms.com

Yash Raj Films is an Indian film production and distribution company founded by filmmaker Yash Chopra in 1970. Since 2012, it has been led by his son Aditya Chopra. The company primarily produces and distributes Hindi films and has played a significant role in shaping the Hindi film industry.

== History ==
In 1970, YRF was founded by Yash Raj Chopra, a veteran director and producer in the Indian film industry. It has produced the following films:

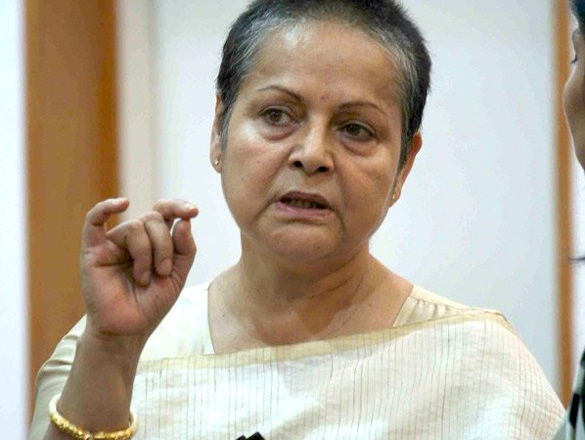
Raakhee played the lead female role in four of the five productions of Yash Raj Films in the 1970s.

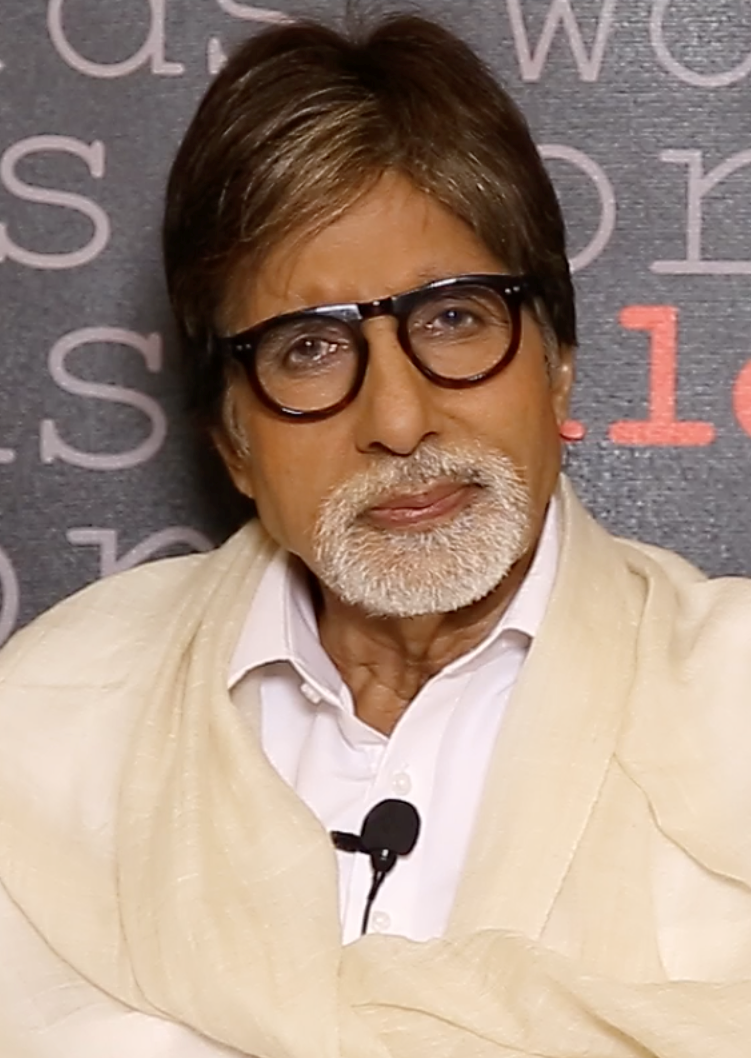
Amitabh Bachchan has collaborated with Yash Raj Films on six projects, playing leading roles in three of them.

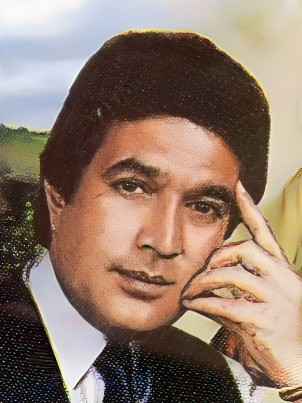
Rajesh Khanna was the leading actor in the company’s first film Daag (1973).

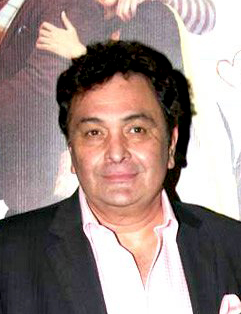
Rishi Kapoor has collaborated with Yash Raj Films on ten projects. (Note: This does not include a guest appearance in Jab Tak Hai Jaan.)

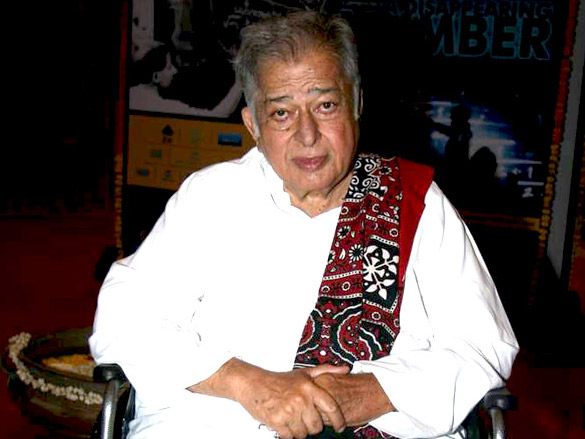
Shashi Kapoor has collaborated with Yash Raj Films on five projects, three of them co-starring with Amitabh Bachchan.

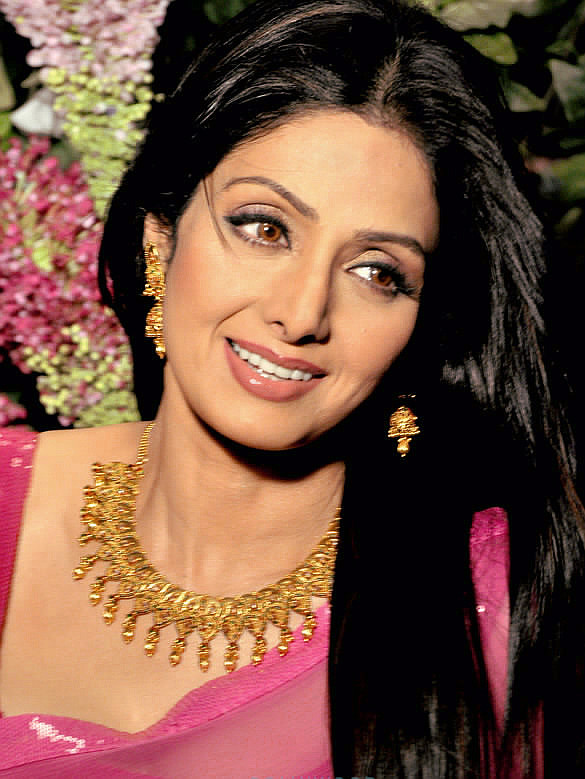
Sridevi played the title role in Yash Raj Films' most successful film of the 1980s — Chandni (1989).

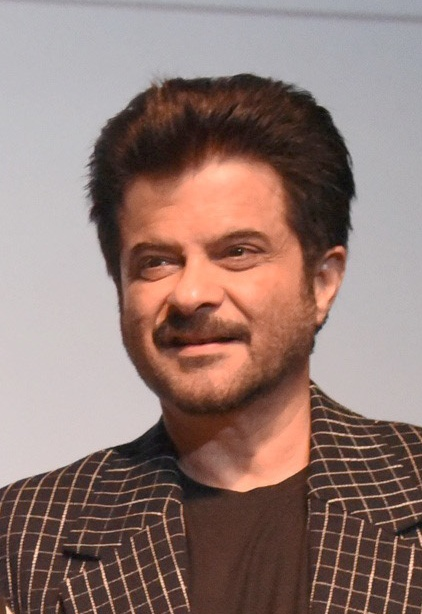
Anil Kapoor has worked with Yash Raj Films on six projects, three of them directed by Yash Chopra starting with Mashaal (1984).

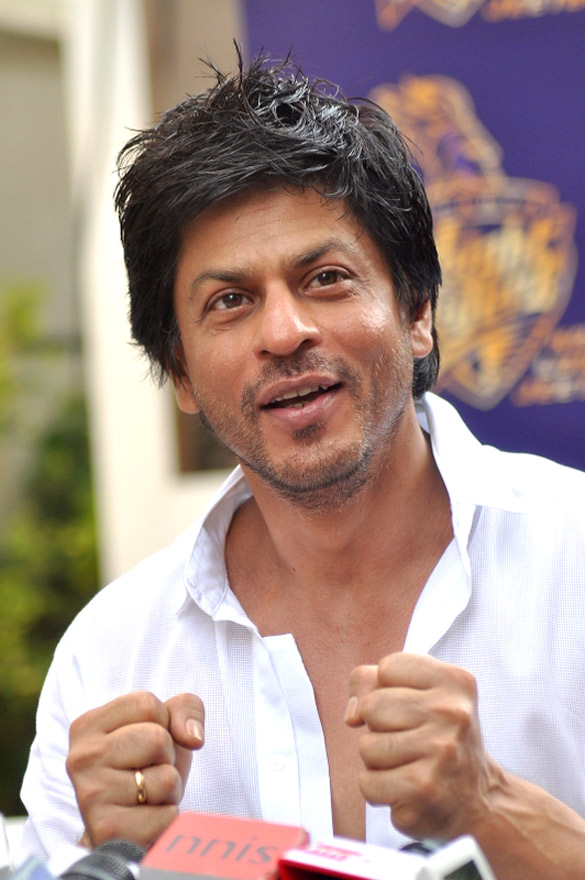
Shah Rukh Khan has worked with Yash Raj Films on ten projects, including their highest-grossing release Pathaan (2023)

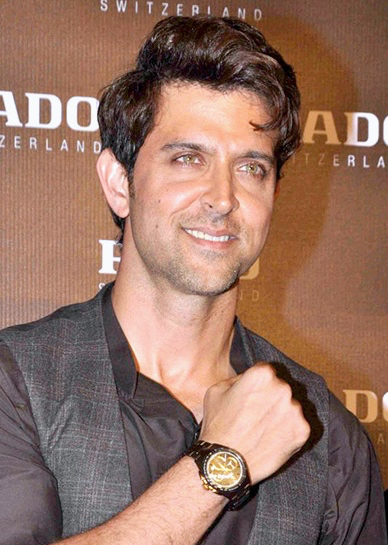
Hrithik Roshan has worked with Yash Raj Films on four projects, beginning with Mujhse Dosti Karoge! (2002).

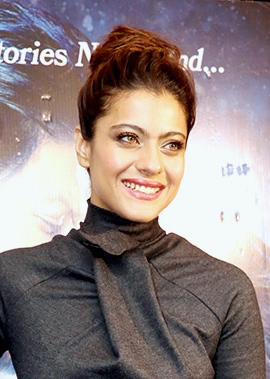
Kajol played the lead role in Dilwale Dulhania Le Jayenge (1995) — the film with the longest theatrical run in Indian cinema history.

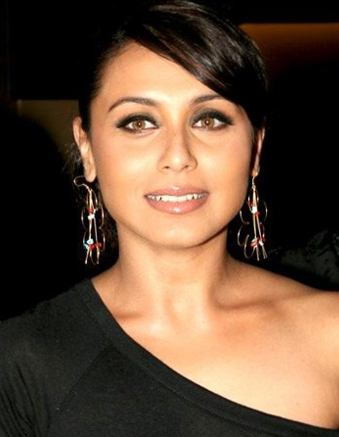
Rani Mukerji has worked with Yash Raj Films on fourteen projects, beginning with Mujhse Dosti Karoge! (2002).

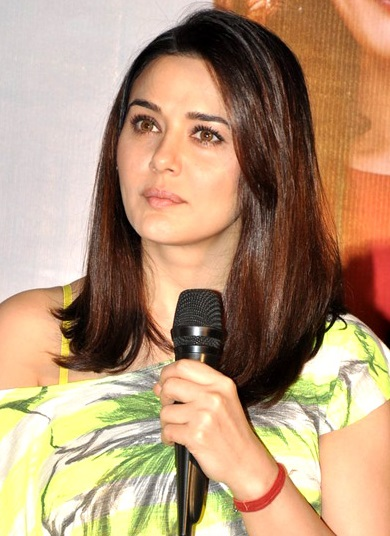
Preity Zinta starred in three of the company's productions in the 2000s.

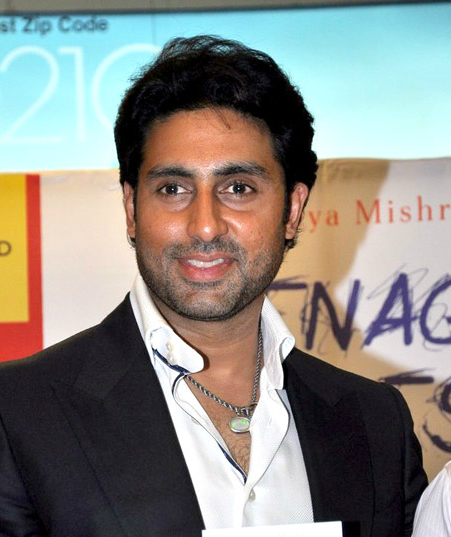
Abhishek Bachchan played the lead role in the Dhoom franchise (2004–13).

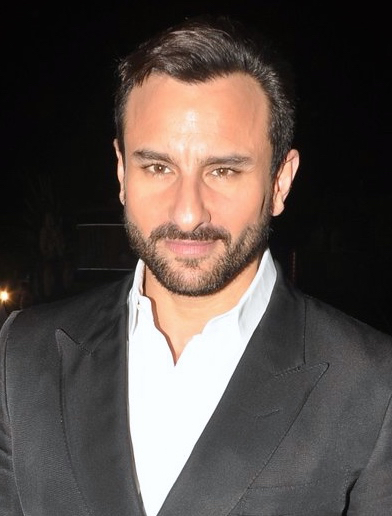
Saif Ali Khan has played leading roles in seven of the company's films.

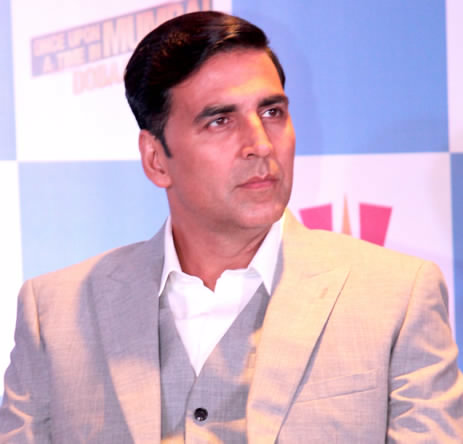
Akshay Kumar has collaborated with the company on four projects, beginning with Yeh Dillagi (1994).

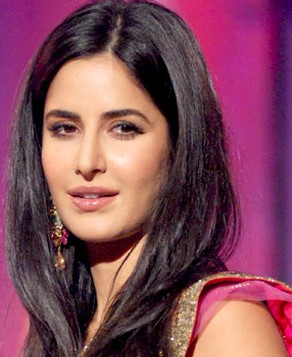
Katrina Kaif has collaborated with Yash Raj Films on eight projects, beginning with New York (2009)

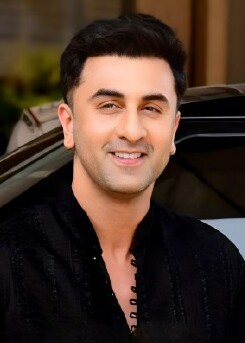
Ranbir Kapoor has collaborated with Yash Raj Films on three projects beginning with his second film Bachna Ae Haseeno (2008).

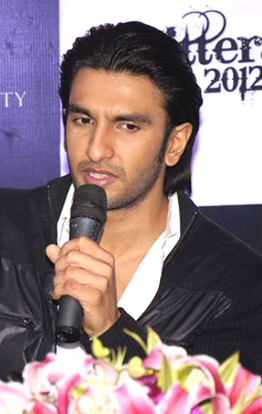
Ranveer Singh made his acting debut with Band Baaja Baaraat (2010), after which he worked with the company for five more films.

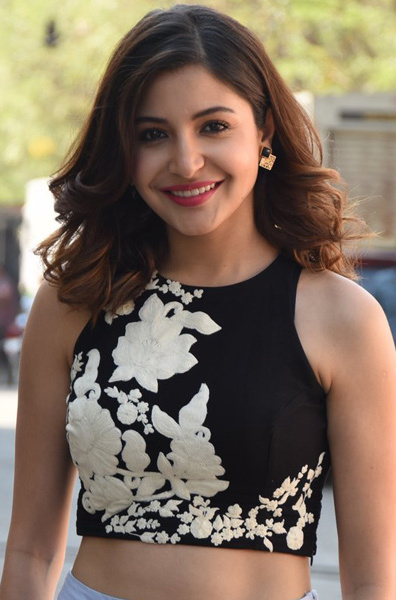
Anushka Sharma made her acting debut with Rab Ne Bana Di Jodi (2008) and has collaborated with the company six more times.

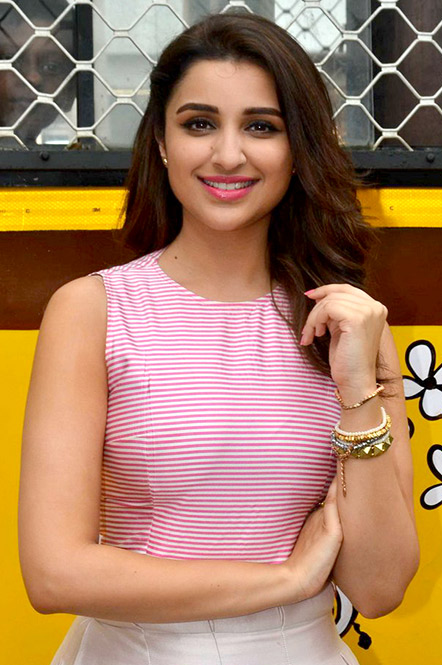
Parineeti Chopra has collaborated with Yash Raj Films on seven projects, including her debut film Ladies vs Ricky Bahl (2011).

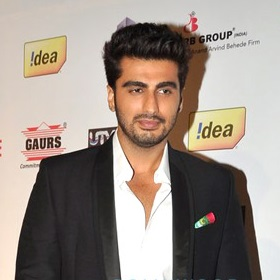
Arjun Kapoor made his acting debut with Ishaqzaade (2012) and has since worked with the company three more times.

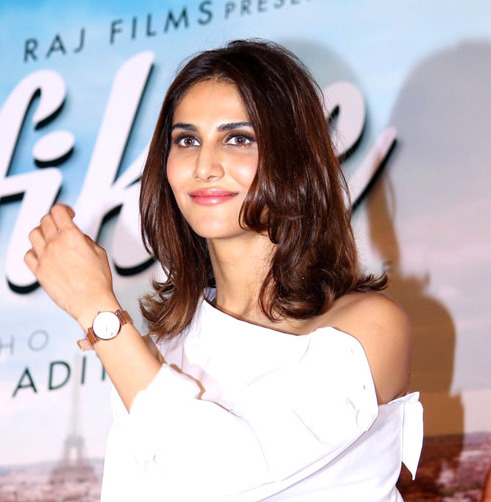
Vaani Kapoor made her acting debut with Shuddh Desi Romance (2013) and has collaborated with the company on four more films.

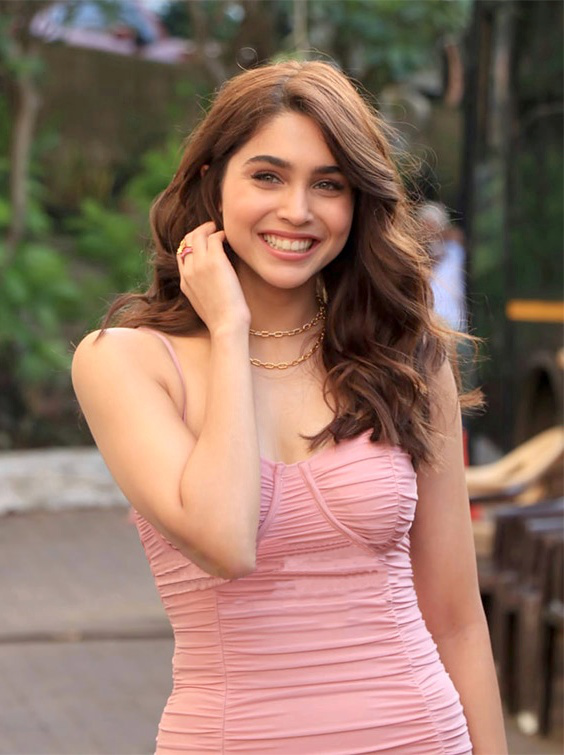
Sharvari made her acting debut with Bunty Aur Babli 2 (2021) and has collaborated with the company on three more films.

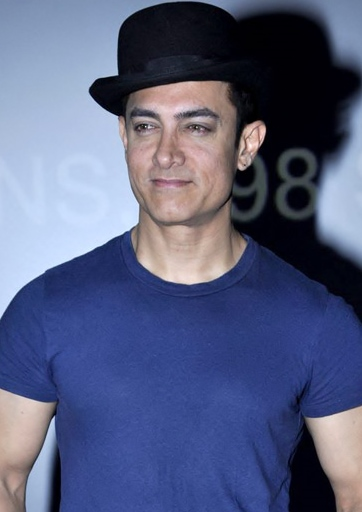
Aamir Khan has starred in two top-grossing films of the company, Fanaa (2006) and Dhoom 3 (2013).

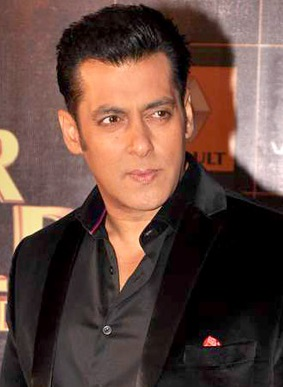
Salman Khan has starred in four of the company's highest-grossing releases, including the three films in the Tiger film series.

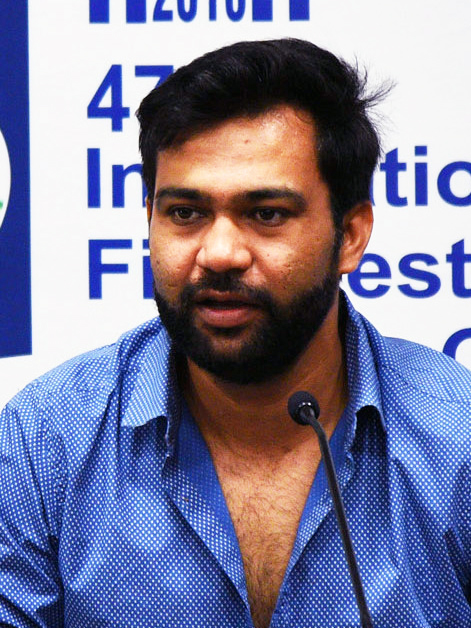
Ali Abbas Zafar has directed five films for the company, including Sultan (2016) and Tiger Zinda Hai (2017).

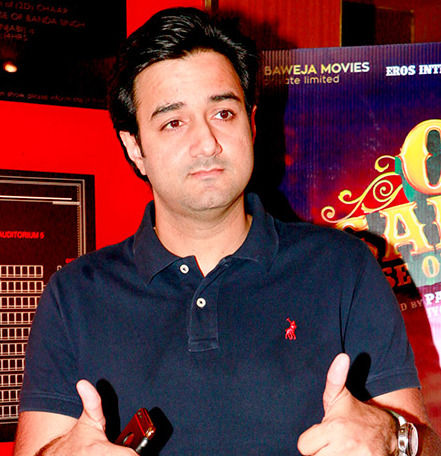
Siddharth Anand has directed five films for the company, including the YRF Spy Universe films War (2019) and Pathaan (2023).

Year	Title	Director	Cast	Synopsis	Ref.
1973	Daag	Yash Chopra	Rajesh Khanna, Sharmila Tagore, Raakhee	A woman learns her presumed-dead husband is alive and married to someone else.	
1976	Kabhi Kabhie	Yash Chopra	Amitabh Bachchan, Raakhee, Shashi Kapoor, Waheeda Rehman, Rishi Kapoor, Neetu Singh	An aspiring poet and a young woman fall in love but marry others, only to be brought together years later through their children.	
1977	Doosra Aadmi	Ramesh Talwar	Raakhee, Rishi Kapoor, Neetu Singh, Shashi Kapoor	A successful woman becomes infatuated with a younger married man who reminds her of her late lover.	
1979	Noorie	Manmohan Krishna	Farooq Sheikh, Poonam Dhillon	After a young woman takes her life following a sexual assault, her fiancé sets out to avenge her death.	
1979	Kaala Patthar	Yash Chopra	Amitabh Bachchan, Shashi Kapoor, Shatrughan Sinha, Raakhee, Parveen Babi, Neetu Singh, Prem Chopra	A disgraced sea captain becomes a coal miner and, with the support of his colleagues, leads a fight for workers’ rights.	
1981	Nakhuda	Dilip Naik	Raj Kiran, Swaroop Sampat, Kulbhushan Kharbanda	A loyal protégé’s relationship with his mentor begins to fracture after his wealthy father-in-law manipulates him for personal gain.	
1981	Silsila	Yash Chopra	Amitabh Bachchan, Jaya Bachchan, Rekha, Sanjeev Kumar	After his brother's death, a man marries his brother's pregnant girlfriend, only to later reignite a love affair with his now-married former lover.	
1982	Sawaal	Ramesh Talwar	Sanjeev Kumar, Poonam Dhillon, Shashi Kapoor, Randhir Kapoor, Waheeda Rehman, Prem Chopra	A powerful criminal's world unravels when his daughter falls in love with a police officer and his son turns against his criminal empire.	
1984	Mashaal	Yash Chopra	Dilip Kumar, Waheeda Rehman, Anil Kapoor, Rati Agnihotri	An honest journalist who exposes a drug lord loses his career and seeks revenge, but a vagabond he once saved tries to steer him away from a life of crime.	
1985	Faasle	Yash Chopra	Sunil Dutt, Rekha, Farooq Sheikh, Farah, Deepti Naval, Raj Kiran, Rohan Kapoor	A widower struggles to balance raising his children and his relationship with a younger woman, but disapproves when his daughter chooses to marry her lover.	
1988	Vijay	Yash Chopra	Rajesh Khanna, Hema Malini, Rishi Kapoor, Anil Kapoor, Meenakshi Sheshadri, Anupam Kher	Two friends become enemies upon discovering they are first cousins, with their destinies shaped by the manipulation of their evil grandfather.	
1989	Chandni	Yash Chopra	Sridevi, Rishi Kapoor, Vinod Khanna, Waheeda Rehman	After her fiancé becomes paralysed in an accident and pushes her away, a heartbroken woman finds comfort in the home of a middle-aged widower.	
1991	Lamhe	Yash Chopra	Anil Kapoor, Sridevi, Waheeda Rehman, Anupam Kher	A man falls in love with an older woman who marries someone else, and years later, her daughter falls in love with him.	
1993	Aaina	Deepak Sareen	Jackie Shroff, Amrita Singh, Juhi Chawla	Two sisters fall in love with the same man, leading to jealousy and heartbreak when he marries one, only for the other to return and claim him.	
1993	Darr	Yash Chopra	Sunny Deol, Juhi Chawla, Shah Rukh Khan	A newly-wed woman is stalked by an obsessed man claiming to be in love with her, and with her husband's help, she tries to escape his harassment.	
1994	Yeh Dillagi	Naresh Malhotra	Akshay Kumar, Saif Ali Khan, Kajol	Two brothers with contrasting personalities fall in love with their chauffeur's daughter, a model, causing tension with their domineering mother.	
1995	Dilwale Dulhania Le Jayenge	Aditya Chopra	Shah Rukh Khan, Kajol	A teenage girl falls in love with a flirtatious boy during a trip across Europe, but is forced by her father to marry someone else.	
1997	Dil To Pagal Hai	Yash Chopra	Shah Rukh Khan, Madhuri Dixit, Karisma Kapoor, Akshay Kumar	A stage dancer falls for her director, but he is in love with another dancer who is engaged to her childhood friend.	
2000	Mohabbatein	Aditya Chopra	Amitabh Bachchan, Shah Rukh Khan, Aishwarya Rai, Uday Chopra, Shamita Shetty, Jugal Hansraj, Kim Sharma, Jimmy Shergill, Preeti Jhangiani	A music teacher inspires his students to stand up against their authoritarian principal to avenge the suicide of his girlfriend.	
2002	Mere Yaar Ki Shaadi Hai	Sanjay Gadhvi	Uday Chopra, Sanjana, Jimmy Shergill, Bipasha Basu	A man decides to break the engagement of his childhood friend after realising that he is in love with her.	
2002	Mujhse Dosti Karoge!	Kunal Kohli	Rani Mukerji, Hrithik Roshan, Kareena Kapoor, Uday Chopra	A man falls for a woman, believing her e-mails were written by her, unaware that they were actually sent by her childhood friend, who secretly loves him.	
2002	Saathiya	Shaad Ali	Rani Mukerji, Vivek Oberoi	A couple faces a series of troubles and misunderstandings after eloping and getting married.	
2004	Hum Tum	Kunal Kohli	Saif Ali Khan, Rani Mukerji	A man and a woman cross paths at various stages of their lives and eventually fall in love after the woman's husband dies.	
2004	Dhoom	Sanjay Gadhvi	Abhishek Bachchan, John Abraham, Uday Chopra, Esha Deol, Rimi Sen	A police officer and a motorbike dealer team up to catch a group of bank robbers.	
2004	Veer-Zaara	Yash Chopra	Shah Rukh Khan, Preity Zinta, Rani Mukerji	An Indian Air Force pilot falls in love with a Pakistani woman, leading to his wrongful imprisonment for 22 years, while a Pakistani lawyer fights for his freedom.	
2005	Bunty Aur Babli	Shaad Ali	Amitabh Bachchan, Abhishek Bachchan, Rani Mukerji	Two villagers run away and become con artists under the aliases Bunty and Babli, while an alcoholic policeman tries to catch them.	
2005	Salaam Namaste	Siddharth Anand	Saif Ali Khan, Preity Zinta	A couple living together in Melbourne faces complications when the woman becomes pregnant, and the man refuses to take responsibility.	
2005	Neal 'n' Nikki	Arjun Sablok	Uday Chopra, Tanishaa Mukerji	A man plans to sleep with 21 women before marriage, but his plans are interrupted by a free-spirited woman.	
2006	Fanaa	Kunal Kohli	Aamir Khan, Kajol	A blind woman falls in love with an undercover terrorist who abandons her, and years later, after regaining her sight, she cares for him without realizing his true identity.	
2006	Dhoom 2	Sanjay Gadhvi	Hrithik Roshan, Abhishek Bachchan, Aishwarya Rai, Uday Chopra, Bipasha Basu, Rimi Sen	A team of police officers tries to catch a skilled jewel thief, using a petty thief to seduce him, but her loyalty to the police is called into question.	
2006	Kabul Express	Kabir Khan	John Abraham, Arshad Warsi, Salman Shahid, Linda Arsenio	Two Indian journalists and an American journalist are held hostage by a Taliban militant while trying to cross the border into Pakistan.	
2007	Ta Ra Rum Pum	Siddharth Anand	Saif Ali Khan, Rani Mukerji	A car racing champion loses his career after an accident, and his family faces hardships before he makes a triumphant comeback.	
2007	Jhoom Barabar Jhoom	Shaad Ali	Abhishek Bachchan, Bobby Deol, Preity Zinta, Lara Dutta, Amitabh Bachchan	Two strangers at a train station lie about their partners while secretly falling for each other, and hire others to be their partners for a dance competition.	
2007	Chak De! India	Shimit Amin	Shah Rukh Khan	A disgraced hockey player tries to redeem himself by coaching a group of underachievers in the India women's national field hockey team to win the world cup.	
2007	Laaga Chunari Mein Daag	Pradeep Sarkar	Jaya Bachchan, Rani Mukerji, Konkona Sen Sharma, Kunal Kapoor, Abhishek Bachchan, Anupam Kher	To support her family, a young woman moves to the city in search of work, but hardships lead her to become a female escort.	
2007	Aaja Nachle	Anil Mehta	Madhuri Dixit, Konkona Sen Sharma, Akshaye Khanna, Kunal Kapoor	A New York-based choreographer returns to her hometown in India to save a dance theatre from being demolished by a local politician.	
2008	Tashan	Vijay Krishna Acharya	Akshay Kumar, Saif Ali Khan, Kareena Kapoor, Anil Kapoor	A woman steals money from her criminal boss, who then hires her disgruntled ex-lover and a gangster to track her down.	
2008	Thoda Pyaar Thoda Magic (Note: The film was co-produced with Kunal Kohli Productions.)	Kunal Kohli	Saif Ali Khan, Rani Mukerji, Rishi Kapoor, Ameesha Patel	An angel comes to Earth to help four troubled kids after a judge orders a loner to take custody of them following an accident that kills their parents.	
2008	Bachna Ae Haseeno	Siddharth Anand	Ranbir Kapoor, Deepika Padukone, Bipasha Basu, Minissha Lamba, Kunal Kapoor, Hiten Paintal	A womanizer seeks forgiveness from two women he abandoned after his heart is broken by another.	
2008	Roadside Romeo (Note: The film was co-produced with Walt Disney Pictures.)	Jugal Hansraj	Saif Ali Khan, Kareena Kapoor	A deserted dog befriends four strays and battles an evil neighborhood dog.	
2008	Rab Ne Bana Di Jodi	Aditya Chopra	Shah Rukh Khan, Anushka Sharma, Vinay Pathak	An under-confident middle-aged man pretends to be a boisterous younger man to win the affection of his newly-wed bride.	
2009	New York	Kabir Khan	John Abraham, Katrina Kaif, Neil Nitin Mukesh, Irrfan Khan	After being wrongly imprisoned post-9/11, a Muslim student turns to terrorism for revenge, while the FBI uses his friend to spy on him.	
2009	Dil Bole Hadippa!	Anurag Singh	Rani Mukerji, Shahid Kapoor, Rakhi Sawant, Anupam Kher, Sherlyn Chopra, Dalip Tahil	A woman disguises herself as a man to pursue her dream of playing professional cricket.	
2009	Rocket Singh: Salesman of the Year	Shimit Amin	Ranbir Kapoor, Gauahar Khan, Shazahn Padamsee	A disillusioned salesman starts his own firm with the help of other disgruntled employees from a computer service company.	
2010	Pyaar Impossible	Jugal Hansraj	Uday Chopra, Priyanka Chopra, Dino Morea	A software engineer becomes a nanny for the daughter of a divorced businesswoman he once had a crush on in college.	
2010	Badmaash Company	Parmeet Sethi	Shahid Kapoor, Anushka Sharma, Meiyang Chang, Vir Das	Four underachieving friends start a successful scam business, but misunderstandings within the group threaten their venture.	
2010	Lafangey Parindey	Pradeep Sarkar	Neil Nitin Mukesh, Deepika Padukone	A blind girl trains to win a skating competition, and is helped in her quest by a street fighter who was responsible for her loss of sight.	
2010	Band Baaja Baaraat	Maneesh Sharma	Ranveer Singh, Anushka Sharma	An ambitious girl and a street-smart boy start a wedding-planning business, but a one-night stand turns them into rivals.	
2011	Mere Brother Ki Dulhan	Ali Abbas Zafar	Katrina Kaif, Imran Khan, Ali Zafar, Tara D'Souza	A man arranges for the marriage of his brother to a loquacious woman, but falls in love with her instead.	
2011	Ladies vs Ricky Bahl	Maneesh Sharma	Ranveer Singh, Anushka Sharma, Parineeti Chopra, Dipannita Sharma, Aditi Sharma	Three women, who have been robbed and deceived by a con man, hire a con woman whom he loves to teach him a lesson.	
2012	Ishaqzaade	Habib Faisal	Parineeti Chopra, Arjun Kapoor, Gauahar Khan	A Hindu man and a Muslim woman from warring political families engage in a passionate affair with each other.	
2012	Ek Tha Tiger	Kabir Khan	Salman Khan, Katrina Kaif, Ranvir Shorey	An Indian RAW agent is on a mission to recover confidential information from a scientist, during which he falls in love with a mysterious Pakistani ISI agent.	
2012	Jab Tak Hai Jaan	Yash Chopra	Shah Rukh Khan, Katrina Kaif, Anushka Sharma	After a car accident, a woman promises to break up with her boyfriend to save his life, leading him to defy death as a bomb-disposal expert.	
2013	Aurangzeb	Atul Sabharwal	Arjun Kapoor, Prithviraj Sukumaran, Sashaa Agha, Rishi Kapoor, Jackie Shroff	The doppelganger of a criminal's son, is forced by his family to go undercover in the criminal's home to take down their criminal syndicate.	
2013	Shuddh Desi Romance	Maneesh Sharma	Sushant Singh Rajput, Parineeti Chopra, Vaani Kapoor, Rishi Kapoor	A man runs away from his arranged wedding to live with another woman, only for her to leave him on their wedding day.	
2013	Dhoom 3	Vijay Krishna Acharya	Aamir Khan, Abhishek Bachchan, Katrina Kaif, Uday Chopra, Jackie Shroff	A circus boy, trained in circus theatrics, vows to take down a corrupt Chicago-based bank after his father's suicide. Two police officers from Mumbai try to catch them.	
2014	Gunday	Ali Abbas Zafar	Ranveer Singh, Arjun Kapoor, Priyanka Chopra, Irrfan Khan	Two refugees from Bangladesh emerge as the most powerful coal bandits in Calcutta. Misunderstandings arise when they both fall in love with the same cabaret dancer.	
2014	Aaha Kalyanam (Note: The Tamilfilm was a remake of Band Baaja Baaraat and the company's first film not in the Hindi language.)	A. Gokul Krishna	Nani, Vaani Kapoor	An ambitious girl and a street-smart boy begin a wedding-planning business, but a one-night stand turns them into rivals.	
2014	Bewakoofiyaan	Nupur Asthana	Ayushmann Khurrana, Sonam Kapoor, Rishi Kapoor	A man fired from his job during the Indian recession must convince his rich girlfriend's father to let her marry him.	
2014	Titli (Note: The film was co-produced with Dibakar Banerjee Productions.)	Kanu Behl	Shashank Arora, Shivani Raghuvanshi, Ranvir Shorey, Amit Sial	The youngest son of a criminal family and his reluctant bride manipulate and ultimately help each other to escape the family.	
2014	Mardaani	Pradeep Sarkar	Rani Mukerji, Tahir Raj Bhasin	Following the disappearance of a teenage girl, a policewoman uncovers secrets of a high-profile sex trafficking racket in India.	
2014	Daawat-e-Ishq	Habib Faisal	Aditya Roy Kapur, Parineeti Chopra	A young woman and her father trap a man under the dowry law in India to fund her trip to America.	
2014	Kill Dil	Shaad Ali	Ranveer Singh, Parineeti Chopra, Ali Zafar, Govinda	Two orphans are trained to be assassins by a gangster. Trouble arises when one of them falls in love and decides to leave the business.	
2015	Dum Laga Ke Haisha	Sharat Katariya	Ayushmann Khurrana, Bhumi Pednekar	An unambitious man is forced into marrying an aspiring schoolteacher. Initially hesitant to accept his overweight bride, the couple eventuality grow closer.	
2015	Detective Byomkesh Bakshy!	Dibakar Banerjee	Sushant Singh Rajput, Swastika Mukherjee	During World War II, Byomkesh Bakshy, a young detective in Calcutta, becomes embroiled in a murder mystery.	
2016	Fan	Maneesh Sharma	Shah Rukh Khan	A star's doppelganger fan turns into a dangerous foe when the former refuses the latter's advances.	
2016	Sultan	Ali Abbas Zafar	Salman Khan, Anushka Sharma	A middle-aged former wrestler with a tragic past overcomes his insecurities to return to the sport.	
2016	Befikre	Aditya Chopra	Ranveer Singh, Vaani Kapoor	An impulsive couple in Paris engage in an affair while promising not to fall in love with each other.	
2017	Meri Pyaari Bindu	Akshay Roy	Ayushmann Khurrana, Parineeti Chopra	A successful writer, stuck with writer's block, returns to his roots to write an old-fashioned love story.	
2017	Qaidi Band	Habib Faisal	Aadar Jain, Anya Singh	Seven innocent under-trials give a band performance in the prison to secure their acquittal.	
2017	Tiger Zinda Hai	Ali Abbas Zafar	Salman Khan, Katrina Kaif	Tiger and his wife, Zoya, unite to rescue Indian and Pakistani nurses held hostage by an Islamic terror group.	
2018	Hichki	Siddharth P. Malhotra	Rani Mukerji	An aspiring teacher suffering from Tourette syndrome must prove herself by educating a group of underprivileged students.	
2018	Sui Dhaaga	Sharat Katariya	Anushka Sharma, Varun Dhawan	An unemployed small town couple start their own garment business.	
2018	Thugs of Hindostan	Vijay Krishna Acharya	Amitabh Bachchan, Aamir Khan, Katrina Kaif, Fatima Sana Shaikh	In 1795, a band of thugs aspire to free Hindostan from the rule of the East India Company. Alarmed, the British send a con-artist to infiltrate and counter the threat.	
2019	War	Siddharth Anand	Hrithik Roshan, Tiger Shroff, Vaani Kapoor	An Indian soldier is assigned to eliminate his mentor, a former soldier gone rogue.	
2019	Mardaani 2	Gopi Puthran	Rani Mukerji, Vishal Jethwa	A policewoman goes up against a young rapist and serial killer.	
2021	Bunty Aur Babli 2	Varun V. Sharma	Saif Ali Khan, Rani Mukerji, Siddhant Chaturvedi, Sharvari	Two scam artists are forced out of retirement when their calling card begins appearing across India.	
2022	Jayeshbhai Jordaar	Divyang Thakkar	Ranveer Singh, Shalini Pandey	A timid man flees with his wife to protect their daughter from foeticide.	
2022	Samrat Prithviraj	Chandraprakash Dwivedi	Akshay Kumar, Sanjay Dutt, Sonu Sood, Manushi Chhillar	Samrat Prithviraj Chauhan of the Chauhan dynasty, clashes with Muhammad Ghori, a ruler from the Ghurid dynasty who led the Islamic Conquest of Hindustan.	
2022	Shamshera	Karan Malhotra	Ranbir Kapoor, Sanjay Dutt, Vaani Kapoor	Set in the 1800s, a dacoit tribe fight for independence against British rule.	
2023	Pathaan	Siddharth Anand	Shah Rukh Khan, Deepika Padukone, John Abraham	An exiled RAW agent must prevent a disgruntled terrorist from releasing a deadly synthetic virus.	
2023	The Great Indian Family	Vijay Krishna Acharya	Vicky Kaushal, Manushi Chhillar	A religious Hindu man has a crisis when he finds out that he is Muslim by birth.	
2023	Tiger 3	Maneesh Sharma	Salman Khan, Katrina Kaif, Emraan Hashmi	Framed as traitors by a vengeful terrorist, two spies embark on a dangerous mission to clear their names.	
2025	Saiyaara	Mohit Suri	Ahaan Panday, Aneet Padda	Two artistic souls find harmony through music despite their contrasting worlds. As feelings deepen, age and circumstances challenge their undeniable bond.	
2025	War 2	Ayan Mukerji	Hrithik Roshan, N. T. Rama Rao Jr., Kiara Advani	A rogue agent infiltrates a multinational terror syndicate while being pursued by another, equally dangerous agent who has a history with him.	
2026	Mardaani 3	Abhiraj Minawala	Rani Mukerji, Janki Bodiwala, Mallika Prasad	A veteran policewoman investigates the case of 93 young girls who have gone missing in three months.	
2026	Alpha	Shiv Rawail	Alia Bhatt, Sharvari, Bobby Deol, Anil Kapoor	A young assassin seeks to take down her mentor's illicit super-soldier program while learning the truth about her family.	
2027	Mupapa † (Note: The film is co-produced with Posham Pa Pictures.)	Sameer Saxena	Ayushmann Khurrana, Shreya Chaudhry	TBA	
2027	Beparwah †	Ali Abbas Zafar	Ahaan Panday, Sharvari, Aaishvary Thackeray, Bobby Deol, Jimmy Sheirgill, Anya Singh	TBA	
2027	Mohit Suri's Untitled Next †	Mohit Suri	Ahaan Panday, Aneet Padda	TBA	
2028	Abhay Pannu's Untitled Next †	Abhay Pannu	Varun Dhawan	TBA	

=== YRF Studios ===
In 2005, Chopra built YRF Studios in Mumbai. In 2006, the first film shot at YRF Studios was the romantic thriller Fanaa. Since then, several notable films have been shot at YRF Studios, including Kabhi Alvida Naa Kehna (2006), Partner (2007), Taare Zameen Par (2007), Dostana (2008), Wanted (2009), 3 Idiots (2009), Dabangg (2010), Bodyguard (2011), Ra.One (2011), Agneepath (2012), Chennai Express (2013), Jai Ho (2014), and PK (2014). The studio consists of six floors and spans 20 acres. YRF Studios has also been rented out for other film and television productions, including 10 Ka Dum and Kaun Banega Crorepati for Sony Entertainment Television, as well as Kya Aap Paanchvi Pass Se Tez Hain?, Koffee With Karan, and Satyamev Jayate for STAR India.

=== YRF Distributors ===
YRF since launching their distribution arm, has not just distributed films produced by them but also several films made by other production companies, within India as well as overseas, which includes a variety of independent films and Parallel Cinema productions such as Godmother (1999), Zubeidaa (2001), Maqbool (2004), and Meenaxi: A Tale of Three Cities (2004) among others. In recent years, YRF has distributed successful films like Tu Jhoothi Main Makkaar (2023), Laapataa Ladies (2024), and Chhaava (2025). While they mostly distribute Hindi films, they have also distributed a few regional films in various languages.

In 2013, the company's distribution team sold the satellite rights of its venture Dhoom 3 for ₹75 crore (US$8.0 million) to Sony Entertainment Television.

=== YRF Home Entertainment ===
YRF Home Entertainment division produces and releases Audio CDs, DVDs, Blu-ray Discs & VCDs. While these include films from YRF's own film catalogue, the division also selectively acquires films from outside banners for releasing them across Home Video formats. YRF Home Entertainment Forever Classics Collection includes many of their own classic films, directed by the company's founder, Yash Chopra and his son Aditya Chopra, besides several popular films from Raj Kapoor Films and B.R. Films, among others.

=== YRF Music ===
The company impacted the music industry through chartbuster soundtracks in their filmography such as Darr (1993), Dilwale Dulhaniya Le Jayenge (1995), Dil To Pagal Hai (1997) and Saiyaara (2025).

=== 2009 Disney buyout-refusal ===
In 2007, The Walt Disney Company entered Indian entertainment through a three-film co-production agreement with YRF, Ta Ra Rum Pum, Thoda Pyaar Thoda Magic, and Roadside Romeo. Disney's move was seen as a bid to increase its global recognition and finally enter the increasingly lucrative Indian cinema arena. In 2009, Disney offered a 49% acquisition of YRF for ₹2,500 crore (US$270 million) (unadjusted for inflation), which took the valuation of the Indian entertainment company to ₹5,000 crore (equivalent to ₹140 billion or US$1.5 billion in 2026). The acquisition proposal did not materialise, as Yash Raj Films chose not to proceed with Disney's offer and continued to operate independently till date.

=== Aditya Chopra as Vice-Chairman ===
From 2007 to 2010, the company saw an all-time low, with several of their high-budgeted films failing at the box office, and thereby suffering losses amounting to millions. The films broke YRF's perfect success ratio and were oddly released one after another. Some of the most unsuccessful films produced under the banner were Jhoom Barabar Jhoom, Laaga Chunari Mein Daag, Aaja Nachle, Tashan, Thoda Pyaar Thoda Magic, Roadside Romeo, Dil Bole Hadippa!, Rocket Singh: Salesman of the Year and Pyaar Impossible.

Aditya Chopra then took over as the vice-chairman of Yash Raj Films in 2010, soon after the release of the film Badmaash Company under the same banner.

In 2011, the company went into production of three individual films with Aamir Khan for Dhoom 3, Shah Rukh Khan for Jab Tak Hai Jaan and with Salman Khan for Ek Tha Tiger, the first installment in the YRF Spy Universe. The three films would become the most expensive productions ever undertaken by YRF; Ek Tha Tiger was produced at ₹75 crore (US$8.0 million), Jab Tak Hai Jaan was produced at ₹60 crore (US$6.4 million) and Dhoom 3 was produced at ₹150 crore (US$16 million).

Film	Day of Release	Screen Releases	Distribution	Budget	Worldwide Gross
Ek Tha Tiger	Eid (2012)	3,850 screens	YRF Distributors	₹75 crore (US$8.0 million)	₹320 crore (US$34 million)
Jab Tak Hai Jaan	Diwali (2012)	3,100 screens	YRF Distributors	₹60 crore (US$6.4 million)	₹241 crore (US$26 million)
Dhoom 3	Christmas (2013)	5,250 screens	YRF Distributors	₹150 crore (US$16 million)	₹542 crore (US$58 million)

All three of these films broke box office records in India and went on to become some of the highest-grossing films of their time. Ek Tha Tiger, which released on the 66th Independence Day of India, earned approximately ₹320 crore (US$34 million) and became the eleventh highest-grossing film of Indian cinema. Jab Tak Hai Jaan opened worldwide on the Diwali day of 2012 and went on to earn ₹241 crore (US$26 million) and became the fifteenth highest-grossing film in India. Dhoom 3 released in (Hindi, Tamil, Telugu and Arabic) on the Christmas week of 2013 and grossed approximately ₹542 crore (US$58 million), in the worldwide market and went on to become the twelfth highest-grossing film of Indian cinema, as of January 2022.

=== Aditya Chopra as Chairman ===
After the death of Yash Chopra in October 2012, Aditya Chopra was elevated to the position of chairman and Chief Executive of the company's studio wing. Facing overwhelming pressure by the Indian bourses to be publicly listed around the same period, the company went for a soft-launch on 3 January 2013.

The company received angel investment by institutional fund-raisers such as LIC of India, RNT Associates, PremjiInvest, Catamaran Ventures, Maruti Udyog and Unilazer Ventures. YRF was made open to Indian enterprises only, and no FDI was accepted. Venture capitalists also showed interest in Adi Godrej, Y. C. Deveshwar, Kumar Birla, Arundhati Bhattacharya, Anand Mahindra, Chanda Kochhar, Sunil Mittal, Shikha Sharma and Uday Kotak investing undisclosed sums. YRF produced more films under the chairmanship of Chopra and the new management.

== YRF Entertainment ==
In November 2011, YRF Entertainment was announced as a subsidiary of Yash Raj Films, in Beverly Hills, California, US, with Uday Chopra as the CEO.

By 2023, YRF Entertainment was transformed into the streaming division of Yash Raj Films.

=== Film ===
Year	Title	Language	Notes	Ref.
2014	The Longest Week	English		
2014	Grace of Monaco	English		
2024	Maharaj	Hindi	Released on Netflix	
2024	Vijay 69	Hindi	Released on Netflix	

=== Television ===
Year	Title	Language	Platform	Notes	Ref.
2023	The Romantics	English; Hindi	Netflix	Documentary series	
2023	The Railway Men	Hindi	Netflix		
2025	Mandala Murders	Hindi	Netflix		
2026	Akka	Hindi	Netflix		
2027	Tunnel Men †	Hindi	Netflix		

== YRF Television ==
YRF Television was a TV production company, based in Mumbai, India, and promoted by Aditya Chopra. YRF Television, although it produced a small number of programmes, all of which were content-oriented productions. It was mainly focused on creating and producing unique, distinctive shows for television audiences, rather than most of the shows that were developed during that time, aiming to provide television viewers with compelling content through fresh, contemporary, and engaging storylines.

YRF Television's shows include Lift Kara De, Seven - The Ashvamedha Prophecy, Mahi Way, Rishta.com, Powder, Khotey Sikkey, Kismat. It was owned by Yash Raj Films (YRF) and entered into an exclusive agreement with Sony Entertainment Television to produce exclusive fiction and non-fiction content for the channel.

== Works with newcomers ==
YRF launched a number of budding screenwriters and directors under their banner throughout these years. Directors and screenwriters such as Kunal Kohli, Kabir Khan, Sanjay Gadhvi, Ali Abbas Zafar, Jaideep Sahni, Siddharth Anand, Shimit Amin, Habib Faisal, Shaad Ali, Maneesh Sharma and Vijay Krishna Acharya debuted under YRF and have gone on to become independent entities in films. The company also produced films for filmmakers such as Anil Mehta, Chandraprakash Dwivedi, and Pradeep Sarkar under their banner. The company was ranked as one of the most powerful film production companies in India in a survey conducted by Filmfare in 2006.

=== Talent Management ===
YRF Talent, the talent management division of Yash Raj Films, also manages several actors and actresses.

== Offices ==
YRF is headquartered in Mumbai. In India, YRF has a network of distribution offices in Mumbai, Delhi, Jalandhar, Jaipur, Amravati, Indore, Bengaluru, Hyderabad, Kolkata, Chennai and Kochi. Internationally, there are offices in the United Kingdom, the United States of America, and the United Arab Emirates.

== Tie-ups ==
Throughout the years of its existence, YRF entered into various business agreements with independent film and media entities present in the country.

Entity	Period	Description
Saregama	1995–2005	Music rights of all films produced under the YRF banner (deal existed until the launch of the company's independent music distribution leg, YRF Music)
Raj Kapoor Films	1995–present	Satellite and home entertainment rights to all films produced under the Raj Kapoor Films banner through the company's home entertainment division, YRF Home Entertainment
Sony Pictures Networks India	1995–2018; 2025–present	Exclusive satellite rights of all films produced under the YRF banner
Dharma Productions	1998–2008	Film distribution and home entertainment rights of all films produced by Dharma Productions (deal existed until the release of Dostana)
FilmKRAFT	2000–2008	Theatrical and home entertainment rights to all films produced under the FilmKRAFT banner (deal existed until the release of Krazzy 4)
Disney	2006–2008	3-film (Ta Ra Rum Pum, Thoda Pyaar Thoda Magic and Roadside Romeo) co-production agreement with Walt Disney Studios
The IMAX Corporation	2012–present	Multi film co-production agreement for releasing films such as Dhoom 3, Thugs of Hindostan, War, Shamshera, Pathaan, Tiger 3, and War 2 in the IMAX format.
Dolby Laboratories	2013–present	Multi-film co-production agreement for all YRF projects (as of October 2013)
The Nikkatsu Corporation	2013–present	3-film exclusive distribution agreement for Ek Tha Tiger, Jab Tak Hai Jaan and Dhoom 3 in the Japanese market
Dell Inc.	2013–present	Joint Venture agreement with Dell Computers for digitization and electronic re-distribution of the entire YRF Library up to Fiscal year 2015
Dibakar Banerjee Productions	2013–2015	3-film (Titli, Detective Byomkesh Bakshy, Sandeep Aur Pinky Faraar) co-production agreement for feature films to be directed by Dibakar Banerjee and his assistant Kanu Behl.
Red Chillies Entertainment	2014–present	Theatrical film distribution of multiple films
Luv Films	2019–present	Theatrical film distribution of multiple films
Star India	2019–present	Exclusive satellite rights of all films produced under the YRF banner
Amazon Prime Video	2016–2025	Exclusive streaming rights of all films produced under the YRF banner
Netflix	2025–present (films)	Exclusive streaming rights of web series and films produced under YRF Entertainment, the streaming division of YRF.
Posham Pa Pictures	2024–present	Theatrical films co-production
Rusk Media	2026	Strategic Investment for co-creating original animation and vertical micro-drama intellectual property(IP) targeting Gen Z and Gen Alpha audiences.
