= Dhoom (film series) =

Film series

- Dhoom film series logo
- Created by: Aditya Chopra
- Original work: Dhoom (2004)
- Owner: Yash Raj Films
- Years: 2004-present

Print publications
- Comics: Dhoom: Redux 893

Films and television
- Film(s): Dhoom (2004); Dhoom 2 (2006); Dhoom 3 (2013)

Games
- Video game(s): Dhoom (2004); Dhoom 2 (2006); Dhoom 3: The Game (2013)

Audio
- Soundtrack(s): Dhoom; Dhoom 2; Dhoom 3

Miscellaneous
- Budget: ₹150 (3 films)
- Box office: ₹791.24 crore (3 films)

Dhoom is an Indian caper action film series produced by Yash Raj Films. The series revolves around Assistant Commissioner of Police Jai Dixit (Abhishek Bachchan) and his sidekick Sub Inspector, later Inspector, Ali Akbar Fateh Khan (Uday Chopra), on missions to capture professional thieves. It is the sixth largest Indian film franchise in terms of box-office revenue.

The latest installment in the series Dhoom 3 has earned over ₹557 crore worldwide. As of 2024, Dhoom is the thirteenth highest-grossing film franchise in Indian cinema.

== Overview ==
=== Dhoom (2004) ===
A mysterious gang of bikers are on a robbing spree, where A.C.P Jai Dixit gets Ali Akbar Fateh Khan, a mechanic, to assist him in the case. With the clock ticking, it's up to the duo to nab the thieves red-handed.

The film stars Abhishek Bachchan and Uday Chopra as buddy cops Jai Dixit and Ali Khan, while John Abraham plays the antagonist, with Esha Deol and Rimi Sen playing supporting roles.

=== Dhoom 2 (2006) ===
Jai and Ali are assigned to trail an international thief codenamed "Mr. A", who steals priceless artifacts and has chosen Mumbai as his next target.

The film introduces Hrithik Roshan and Aishwarya Rai Bachchan as the antagonists and also introduces Bipasha Basu in a dual supporting role, while Abhishek Bachchan and Uday Chopra reprise their roles as Jai Dixit and Ali Khan.

=== Dhoom 3 (2013) ===
When Sahir, a circus entertainer trained in magic and acrobatics, turns into a thief to take down a corrupt bank in Chicago that is responsible for his father's death, Jai and Ali are called to catch him.

The film introduces Aamir Khan as the antagonist, while Abhishek Bachchan and Uday Chopra reprise their roles as Jai Dixit and Ali Khan, and Katrina Kaif and Tabrett Bethell play supporting roles.

== Films ==
Film	Release date	Director	Screenwriter(s)	Story by	Producer
Dhoom	27 August 2004	Sanjay Gadhvi	Vijay Krishna Acharya, Aditya Chopra	Aditya Chopra	Aditya Chopra
Dhoom 2	24 November 2006	Sanjay Gadhvi	Vijay Krishna Acharya, Aditya Chopra	Aditya Chopra	Aditya Chopra
Dhoom 3	20 December 2013	Vijay Krishna Acharya	Vijay Krishna Acharya, Aditya Chopra	Aditya Chopra	Aditya Chopra

=== Dhoom (2004) ===
Dhoom was the first installment of the series which was released on 27 August 2004, and received mixed-to-positive reviews. The film became a commercial success and its lifetime worldwide adjusted gross is ₹72.5 crore (US$7.5 million). Overseas gross of Dhoom stands at US$2 million with its US gross at $330,400.

=== Dhoom 2 (2006) ===
Dhoom 2 was the second installment in this series which was released on 24 November 2006 in India, where it received critical acclaim from critics.

Taran Adarsh of Bollywood Hungama gave 4.5 out of 5 stars, reporting "On the whole, Dhoom 2 is a winner all the way. For Yash Raj, who've not only produced but also distributed the film, Dhoom 2 should emerge as one of the biggest hits of their career." Rachel Saltz of The New York Times reviewed, "The pleasure principle is palpable in the giddy, slick Dhoom 2, a satisfying example of the new, thoroughly modern Bollywood. In India, Dhoom 2 broke several box-office records, mainly those for opening day and opening weekend grosses, including a first week of ₹66 million in Mumbai and ₹179 million for all of India. It grossed US$979,000 in North America in 63 theatres over its three-day opening weekend ($1.3 million over four days), becoming the third largest opening weekend for a Bollywood film in North America. Dhoom 2 is estimated to have grossed US$8,750,000 total in the overseas markets.

=== Dhoom 3 (2013) ===
Dhoom 3 was the third installment of the series, which was released on 20 December 2013 and received mixed-to-positive reviews from critics.

Taran Adarsh of Bollywood Hungama rated the film 4.5 out of 5 stars and said, "On the whole, DHOOM-3 is one solid entertainer loaded with attitude and star power that will leave fans of the series salivating for more." The film went on to gross ₹4 billion (US$42 million) worldwide in just ten days, and becomes the eleventh highest-grossing Indian film of all time.

== Cast and characters ==
This table lists the main characters who appear in the Dhoom Franchise.

List indicator
- A dark grey cell indicates the character was not in the film.

Actors	Films		
Actors	Dhoom (2004)	Dhoom 2 (2006)	Dhoom 3 (2013)
Uday Chopra	Sub Inspector / Inspector Ali Akbar Fateh Khan	Sub Inspector / Inspector Ali Akbar Fateh Khan	Sub Inspector / Inspector Ali Akbar Fateh Khan
Abhishek Bachchan	ACP / DCP Jai Dixit	ACP / DCP Jai Dixit	ACP / DCP Jai Dixit
Rimi Sen	Sweety J. Dixit	Sweety J. Dixit	
John Abraham	Kabir Sharma		
Esha Deol	Sheena Rai		
Arav Chaudhary	Rahul		
Ajay Pande	Vinod		
Farid Amiri	Tony		
Rohit Chopra	Rohit		
Manoj Joshi	Shekhar Kamal		
Hrithik Roshan		Aryan Singhania "Mr. A" / Queen Elizabeth II	
Aishwarya Rai		Sunehri Kaur	
Bipasha Basu		Shonali Bose / Monali Bose	
Aamir Khan			Sahir Khan / Samar Khan
Katrina Kaif			Aaliya Hussain
Jackie Shroff			Iqbal Haroon Khan
Siddharth Nigam			Young Sahir Khan / Young Samar Khan
Tabrett Bethell			Victoria Williams

== Additional crew and production details ==
Occupation	Film		
Occupation	Dhoom (2004)	Dhoom 2 (2006)	Dhoom 3 (2013)
Director	Sanjay Gadhvi	Sanjay Gadhvi	Vijay Krishna Acharya
Producer	Aditya Chopra	Aditya Chopra	Aditya Chopra
Story	Aditya Chopra	Aditya Chopra	Aditya Chopra; Vijay Krishna Acharya
Screenplay & Dialogues	Vijay Krishna Acharya	Vijay Krishna Acharya	Vijay Krishna Acharya
Editor	Rameshwar S. Bhagat	Rameshwar S. Bhagat	Ritesh Soni
Music	Pritam	Pritam	Pritam
Lyrics	Sameer Anjaan	Sameer Anjaan	Sameer Anjaan; Kausar Munir; Amitabh Bhattacharya
Background Score	Salim–Sulaiman	Salim–Sulaiman	Julius Packiam
Cinematography	Nirav Shah	Nirav Shah; Vikas Sivaraman	Sudeep Chatterjee
Production Design	Sartaj Singh	Vinod Guruji; K.K. Muralidharan; Rachna Rastogi	Rajnish Hedao; Sumit Basu; Snigdha Basu
Action Directors	Allan Amin	Allan Amin	Conrad Palmisano; Sham Kaushal
Costume Designers	Anaita Shroff Adajania	Anaita Shroff Adajania	Anaita Shroff Adajania; Manoshi Nath; Rushi Sharma
Choreographer(s)	Vaibhavi Merchant; Ashley Lobo; Remo D'Souza; Shruti Merchant	Vaibhavi Merchant; Shiamak Davar	Vaibhavi Merchant
Production Companies	Yash Raj Films	Yash Raj Films	Yash Raj Films
Distributing Companies	Yash Raj Films	Yash Raj Films	Yash Raj Films
Running Time	129 minutes	152 minutes	172 minutes

== Reception ==
=== Box office performance ===
The franchise has been notable for its profit, with Dhoom and its follow-up having earned a combined profit of ₹823.7 crore, according to IBtimes.

Film	Release date	Budget	Box office revenue	Ref.
Dhoom	27 August 2004	₹11 crore (US$2.43 million)	₹72.5 crore (US$16 million)	
Dhoom 2	24 November 2006	₹35 crore (US$7.73 million)	₹162 crore (US$35.76 million)	
Dhoom 3	20 December 2013	₹175 crore (US$29.86 million)	₹556.74 crore (US$95.01 million)	
Total		₹221 crore (US$23 million) (three films)	₹791.24 crore (US$82 million) (three films)	

Critical reception

Film	Rotten Tomatoes
Dhoom	N/A (1 reviews)
Dhoom 2	93% (7/10 average rating) (14 reviews)
Dhoom 3	67% (6.6/10 average rating) (21 reviews)

== Home media ==
Films	Satellite Rights	Digital Rights
Dhoom	Star Gold	Netflix
Dhoom 2	Star Gold	Netflix
Dhoom 3	Star Gold	Netflix

== Influence ==
The movie had a significant cultural impact among urban Indian youth. It was blamed for an increase in incidents of street racing, bike-borne theft and stunting on public roads. Besides, there was a new impetus to the bike-modifying scene with youth going in for modifications to their bikes ranging from free flow exhaust systems to addition of NOS kits. In Malappuram district of Kerala, four members of a group of criminals had cracked the floor of South Malabar Gramin Bank in the early hours on 30 December 2007 and looted ₹ 2.5 million and 80 kilograms of gold, a total worth of Rs. 80 million, considered to be one of the biggest thefts in Kerala's crime records. The Kerala Police have arrested four people in connection with this and the leader admitted that he was inspired by Dhoom. The media in India drew parallels to Dhoom 2.

== Graphic novel ==
A graphic novel named Dhoom: Redux 893, has been published in 2012 by Yomics.

== Video games ==
- Dhoom (2004) and Dhoom 2 (2006), video games by FXLabs based on the first and second films of the series.
- Dhoom:3 The Game and Dhoom:3 Jet Speed by 99games based on the third film of the series.

== Rumoured projects ==
There have been large number of false rumours spread of an upcoming sequel to Dhoom 3, some rumours stating that Akshay Kumar would be in Dhoom 4. However, Yash Raj Films later clarified that they had never asked Akshay for a role in the film. In fact they further even stated that they did not even have a script, plot, or even an idea, at that point. The response that the production company gave even further clarified that there was no actors yet even signed or in consideration for the so-called Dhoom 4 by the production company.

This was not the first time such a rumour relating to Dhoom 4 happened: when Shah Rukh Khan was rumoured to be in the film, one of the directors at the production company stated a similar statement that there was no story for a Dhoom 4. The actor himself even stated that he had not yet been offered to sign up for a Dhoom 4 film. This was the same case when other actors were speculated, with the production house stating the same response. In fact in at some time in 2018, a spokesperson of the production company stated that there were no current plans for the movie. However, around the time of the release of Thugs of Hindostan, a film made by the same director of Dhoom 3, some people from the production house stated the possibility of a release of Dhoom 4 lies on how successful the movie is.
