= Dhoom 2 =

2006 Indian film by Sanjay Gadhvi

- Theatrical release poster
- Directed by: Sanjay Gadhvi
- Written by: Vijay Krishna Acharya
- Story by: Aditya Chopra
- Produced by: Aditya Chopra
- Starring: Hrithik Roshan; Abhishek Bachchan; Aishwarya Rai; Uday Chopra; Bipasha Basu
- Cinematography: Nirav Shah; Vikas Sivaraman
- Edited by: Rameshwar S. Bhagat
- Music by: Songs: Pritam; Score: Salim–Sulaiman
- Production company: Yash Raj Films
- Distributed by: Yash Raj Films
- Release date: 24 November 2006
- Running time: 152 minutes
- Country: India
- Language: Hindi
- Budget: ₹35 crore
- Box office: est.₹151.38 crore

Dhoom 2 (transl. Blast 2), also known as Dhoom 2: Back in Action, is a 2006 Indian Hindi-language action thriller film directed by Sanjay Gadhvi with script and dialogues written by Vijay Krishna Acharya from a story by Aditya Chopra, who produced the film under Yash Raj Films. The film, a sequel to Dhoom and the second installment of the Dhoom series, stars Hrithik Roshan, Abhishek Bachchan, Aishwarya Rai, Uday Chopra, and Bipasha Basu.

Dhoom 2 was shot primarily in India, Durban and Rio de Janeiro, becoming the first major Hindi film to be shot in Brazil. Dhoom 2 was released on 24 November 2006 to positive reviews from critics, with praise for its action sequences, soundtrack, cinematography and cast performances (particularly Roshan), but criticism for its script and pacing. The film grossed over ₹1.514 billion and became the highest grossing Hindi film of 2006. It became the highest-grossing Hindi film of all time at the time of its release, before being surpassed by Om Shanti Om (2007), and the second highest-grossing Hindi film in overseas markets behind Kabhi Alvida Naa Kehna (2006), also co-starring Bachchan.

At the 52nd Filmfare Awards, Dhoom 2 received 8 nominations, including Best Film, Best Director (Gadhvi) and Best Actress (Rai), and won Best Actor (Roshan). The film also marks the second collaboration between Bachchan and Roshan after Main Prem Ki Diwani Hoon (2003), and the fourth between Bachchan and Rai after Dhai Akshar Prem Ke (2000), Kuch Naa Kaho (2003) and Umrao Jaan (2006); the latter two fell in love during the production of Dhoom 2 and got married the following year.

Dhoom 2 proved to be controversial post release, due to an appeal by the Mumbai city police commissioner to censor the fast-paced action scenes, owing to fears that it would inspire Indian youths to ride their motorcycles rashly, resulting in an increase in the number of road accidents.

A sequel titled Dhoom 3 was released on 20 December 2013. Abhishek Bachchan has since named Dhoom 2 as his favorite film in the series.

== Plot ==
In the Namib Desert. Mr. A skydives onto a train that is carrying Queen Elizabeth II, where he steals her crown by disguising himself as the Queen, beats her guards and escapes. ACP Jai Dixit and newly promoted SI Ali Akbar Khan are introduced to Shonali Bose, Jai's best friend and a special officer assigned to investigate Mr. A's case. During the initial investigation, Jai analyses the underlying trend in Mr. A's heists and calls him a "perfect thief" getting impressed by the patterns of his heists and concludes that the theft will follow in one of two famous Mumbai city museums. Jai realizes that the artifact in the museum, which he is guarding, happens to be imperfect and rushes to the other museum, where a Mr. A disguised as a statue then an old security staff steals a rare diamond and escapes from the museum.

Mr. A is about to catch a flight, but he sees on the TV that someone else is claiming to be himself and learns that the imposter challenges the cops by saying that they will steal an ancient warrior sword. In response, Jai, Shonali and Khan enforce a strict guard at the location of the sword. Mr. A meets the thief who made the claim on TV in the room that holds the sword. The police are alerted, but Mr. A swiftly manages to steal the sword and escape with the imposter injuring Shonali in the confrontation. The impersonator turns out to be Sunehri Kaur, who idolises Mr. A. Sunehri wants to form an alliance with Mr. A, but he turns her down. After a game of basketball, Mr. A finally agrees to work with Sunehri.

In Rio de Janeiro, Mr. A and Sunehri plan their next heist. As Jai's analysis has named Rio as the location of Mr. A's next heist, Jai and Ali travel there and meet Monali, Shonali's twin sister who falls in a consensual love with Ali. Later, Sunehri meets with Jai to discuss her partnership with Mr. A, revealing that they are working together and Jai has promised Sunehri freedom from prison in exchange. The plan is for Sunehri to get close to Mr. A and find out his next plan so that the police can arrest him, but she begins to have her doubts. Mr. A and Sunehri fall in love with each other, where he unveils his real identity as Aryan Singhania and starts preparing Sunehri with his methods for next heist. During the Rio Carnival, Aryan, disguised as one of the entertainers, sees Sunehri and Jai together and realizes that Sunehri has been working undercover for Jai. Later Aryan spends the night amongst Jai's team and with Sunehri along with revealing himself to Jai and engaging in a cop-thief relationship conversation with him.

The next day, Aryan forces Sunehri to play a game of Russian roulette, though she doesn't want to shoot him. After six attempted shots, neither is killed, because Aryan never loaded the gun. Sunehri admits that she betrayed Aryan and confesses her love for him and they shares a passionate kiss. In their final heist, Aryan and Sunehri steals some early Lydian coins while disguised as performing dwarfs and later as school going kids. With the heist successfully pulled off, Jai realises that he has been betrayed, as Sunehri called him on the phone to reveal that she wants to stay with Aryan and breaks off their deal, forcing Jai and Ali to chase them. After the chase, all of them end up on the top of a waterfall, where Ali catches Sunehri while Aryan and Jai exchange blows at each other. Sunehri, despite conveying her feelings for Aryan, shoots him after he indirectly asks her to kill him by pointing towards Jai that if he had ever loved someone to the extent he would die by his lover's hands for the sake of their love. Aryan falls from the waterfall, after which Jai allows Sunehri to go free as her punishment to stay alone as she can't betray not even herself by staying alone same as once Aryan stated to her.

Six months later, it is revealed that Aryan survived and has opened a restaurant in the Fiji islands with Sunehri and they have happily settled with each other. Jai meets Aryan and Sunehri at the restaurant and states that he does not wish to imprison the couple despite their crimes as the thieves inside them are already dead now and they have started a new life afresh despite them agreeing to surrender themselves. Aryan reveals that all of his robberies artifacts can be found via a digital watch. Jai is aware of the couple's feelings towards each other and releases them with a warning against returning to their life of crime. After leaving, Jai receives a phone call, and informs Ali, who seems to have settled with Monali, that they should be heading back to India for their next case while Aryan and Sunehri are shown to have a happy life through the title track.

== Cast ==
- Hrithik Roshan in a dual role as
  - Aryan Singhania alias Mr. A: A skilled thief and Sunehri's love-interest
  - Queen Elizabeth II (Cameo)
- Abhishek Bachchan as A.C.P Jai Dixit
- Aishwarya Rai as Sunheri Kaur: A thief and Aryan's love-interest
- Uday Chopra as Sub Inspector Ali Akbar Fateh Khan: Jai's right-hand man; Monali's love-interest
- Bipasha Basu in a dual role as
  - A.C.P Shonali Bose: Jai's colleague; Monali's twin sister
  - Monali Bose: Ali's love-interest; Shonali's twin sister
- Rimi Sen as Sweety J. Dixit: Jai's wife (special appearance)
- Yusuf Hussain as Mumbai Police Commissioner
- Mohit Chauhan as Chief Security Guard
- Sushant Singh Rajput as an uncredited background dancer behind Hrithik Roshan in the song "Dhoom Again"

== Production ==
=== Development ===
The Dhoom franchise began with the release of Dhoom in 2004. The film emerged as a commercial success at the box-office and received positive reviews from audiences, but mixed-to-negative reviews from critics. As a result, producer Yash Chopra announced plans for a sequel, titled Dhoom 2 – Back in Action. John Abraham, portrayer of Kabir Sharma, the villain of the predecessor, was eliminated from the sequel because Chopra did not want Dhoom 2 to repeat the stories featured in its predecessor. Instead, Hrithik Roshan and Aishwarya Rai were introduced into the franchise as the sequel's main villains. Rai's character was summarized as Catwoman, a female fictional comic book femme fatale or anti-hero. Rai stated, "All I can tell you is it would be nothing like anything you've seen me do before." Producer Aditya Chopra told Rai to lose weight after she gained it for her role in Bride & Prejudice (2004). Yash Chopra stated, "But yes, the role does require Rai to convey oodles of sensuality. She has asked for a couple of months to get into shape. We (at Yash Raj Films) are very clear about every character in every script and what's required of the actors. Before Dhoom, Esha Deol was specifically briefed about the look and the attitude she needed to cultivate. She readily agreed, and look at what Dhoom did to her career!" Roshan also lost 5 kg for his role at Aditya Chopra's request. With the exception of Abraham and Deol, all of the other main actors in Dhoom reprised their roles for Dhoom 2.

=== Filming ===
Dhoom 2 was filmed in Mumbai (India), Namibia, Durban (South Africa), and Rio de Janeiro (Brazil), making it the first Bollywood movie to be shot in Brazil. In total, production lasted 18 months and cost of ₹350 million. To ensure the sequel would be different from the original, which became famous for its brash motorcycle stunts, director Sanjay Gadhvi included very few motorcycles in Dhoom 2. Nonetheless, Roshan's role required him to perform several dangerous stunts involving activities such as roller-blading, sand boarding and snow-boarding.

Dhoom 2 made extensive use of visual effects, which were filmed at Yash Raj Studios. While shooting at Yash Raj Studios, the film suffered from a flood that destroyed the studio sets and delayed production. Fight and action sequences were storyboarded before being shown to Gadhvi and Allan Amin, who would make changes. The scenes were then sketched, given "proper shot-list[s]", and shared with Tata Elxsi, who oversaw the pre-visualization of the sequences. Several scenes were filmed with the use of green screen and computer-generated imagery. For example, the stunts Roshan performed on a train in the Namib Desert used green screen; after Roshan recorded the stunts on a set, Gadhvi traveled to the desert to film the background. Other stunts were performed by stuntmen whose faces were later digitally exchanged with the actors'.

The bullet effects and Roshan's gadgets and the mechanical arm were also computer-generated. The scene involving Bachchan coming out of a lake using a jet ski was created using a green screen. The stunt came out at 90 degrees, but Gadhvi wanted a 60 degrees jump. So, it was shot with a Super 35, and hence the angle could be changed. Gadhvi discussed the use of technology in an interview:

We've done animation and pre-visualization for all the action sequences in Dhoom 2 and that is very important in terms of planning, cost effectiveness and also it's a new way of preparing for the shoot and the film especially which is as set on such a large canvas such as Dhoom 2. In Dhoom, we had all the action sequences broken down and written. In this movie, we had very big action sequences, so we had all the scenes storyboarded, and they would be checked, double checked and triple checked by myself, Alan Amin, and Adi, and we would then rectify if needed, and that would be our level of planning.

== Music ==
The soundtrack of Dhoom 2 was composed by Pritam Chakraborty with lyrics penned by Sameer except "Dhoom Again" by Asif Ali Beg. Although most of the song's lyrics are primarily written in Hindi with some English, "Dhoom Again" is almost entirely in English. The soundtrack received mixed reviews from critics but high praise from the audience. It became the best-selling Bollywood soundtrack of the year.

== Release ==
Dhoom 2 was released on 24 November 2006 in India, where it received the widest release in Indian cinema at the time with over 1800 prints, including 250 digital copies. Some locations raised ticket prices for the film.

=== Legal issues ===
Mumbai police commissioner calls for censoring of the fast-paced rash driving scenes in the film due to fears that it would inspire Indian youths to ride their motorcycles rashly, resulting in an increase in the number of road accidents. Unlike the original, the robberies depicted in Dhoom 2 were not inspired by any real-life crimes. Dhoom 2 allegedly inspired the robbery of a man by his nephew, who wore clothing similar to Hrithik Roshan in the film while committing the crime. Following the release, Aishwarya Rai received legal notices from several viewers and fans for a kissing scene with Hrithik Roshan.

== Marketing ==
Dhoom 2's teaser trailer was released along with Kabhi Alvida Naa Kehna, which released on 11 August 2006.

It was promoted with several tie-ins. Coca-Cola promoted the film as "Coke Uthale, Dhoom Machale". India's video game producing company FXLabs developed two games based on the film: Dhoom 2 (2007) and Dhoom 2.5 (2008). Pepe Jeans sold Dhoom 2-related garments, including shirts, jeans, bandannas, caps, and metal accessories. Chetan Shah, the country head of Pepe Jeans London, stated – "Pepe Jeans is tremendously excited to be associated with the most awaited movie of the year Dhoom:2. The incredible ensemble cast of Hrithik Roshan, Abhishek Bachchan, Aishwarya Rai, Bipasha Basu and Uday Chopra and the exciting and explosive content of the film encapsulates everything that the Pepe Jeans brand stands for - young, cool, trendy, hip, fashionable and innovative. While promoting Dhoom 2, Roshan admitted feeling foolish over his past statements about his co-star Rai being a "pretty face with no talent" after they worked together for the first time in Dhoom 2. The duo were again cast opposite each other in Jodhaa Akbar (2008) and Guzaarish (2010), and thus went on to become one of the most-loved on-screen pairs of Bollywood.

== Box office ==
In India, Dhoom 2 broke several box-office records, mainly those for opening day and opening weekend grosses, including a first week of ₹66 million in Mumbai and ₹179 million for all of India. In Mumbai, distributors received a profit of ₹94 million on the first week's business. Box Office India awarded it a "blockbuster" rating after the film netted ₹803 million in India and grossed ₹1.5 billion worldwide on a budget of ₹350 million. It is currently the 13th highest-grossing film in India (unadjusted for inflation).

Dhoom 2 grossed US$979,000 in North America in 63 theatres over its three-day opening weekend ($1.3 million over four days), becoming the third largest opening weekend for a Bollywood film in North America. Overall, it was the seventeenth ranked film at the American box office. Box Office Mojo reports it earned a total of $2,643,586 inside the United States and a total of $29,752,841 in other countries, including India. In Dubai, it achieved the highest first day opening for a Bollywood film.

Dhoom 2 ranked sixth among the highest-grossing opening weekends for international films at the United Kingdom box office with a gross (average per screen) of £8,151. At the Australian box office, it had the twelfth highest opening and collected approximately A$176,462. It grossed approximately NZ $51,453 on five screens in New Zealand. Dhoom 2 grossed over US$8,750,000 total in the overseas markets.

== Reception ==
=== India ===
Dhoom 2 received positive reviews from critics.

Taran Adarsh of Bollywood Hungama gave 4.5/5 stars and wrote "Dhoom 2 is a winner all the way. For Yash Raj Films, who've not only produced but also distributed the film, Dhoom 2 should emerge as one of the biggest hits of their career." Rajesh Karkera of Rediff gave 3.5/5 stars and wrote "A complete roller-coaster ride which left me completely enthralled and exhausted. Sure, there are faults when you stop to think rationally. But that does not stop you from being dazzled by the film." Rajeev Masand of CNN-IBN gave 3/5 stars and wrote that Dhoom 2 is without doubt better than its predecessor, and that Roshan is the heart and soul of the film.

=== International ===
On the review aggregator website Rotten Tomatoes, 93% of 14 critics' reviews are positive, with an average rating of 7/10.

Variety wrote "Loaded with enough attitude, Bollywood star-power and buff bodies to stop a speeding train, Dhoom 2 has been doing humongous biz since its 24 November worldwide opening, and provides adequate proof that Yash Raj Films is good for more than just family-oriented romantic comedy-dramas." Rachel Saltz of The New York Times wrote "The pleasure principle is palpable in the giddy, slick Dhoom 2, a satisfying example of the new, thoroughly modern Bollywood. It may represent the new-fangled Bollywood, but old-fashioned star power is what animates and elevates it above its occasional narrative flaws and longueurs."

Ethan Alter of Film Journal International wrote "Dhoom 2 has all of the benefits of a big-budget Bollywood production – big-name stars, exotic locales, well-produced musical numbers and elaborate (by Bollywood standards, anyway) action sequences. It makes no lasting contributions to world cinema, but if 2.5 hours of disposable entertainment are all you're after, you could do far worse." David Chute of L.A. Weekly stated the film was, "A movie meal as satisfying as this one can make you feel that nothing else matters."

Jaspreet Pandohar of BBC wrote "By roping in acclaimed action director Alan Amin to take care of the thrills and spills, you'd expect Gadhvi to have spent time crafting out a sophisticated storyline instead of simply sending his cast on a cat-and-mouse chase around the globe. It's only Roshan's charismatic performance as the criminal mastermind, and the sizzling chemistry he shares with Rai's sassy cohort, that rescues this adventure from becoming an elongated tourism commercial." Manish Gajjar, Bollywood correspondent for BBC Shropshire, wrote "With its high-powered action sequences matching Hollywood standards, Dhoom 2 is a winner all the way at the box office!."

== Accolades ==
Award	Date of the ceremony	Category	Recipients	Result	Ref.
Screen Awards	6 January 2007	Best Actor	Hrithik Roshan	Nominated	
Screen Awards	6 January 2007	Best Actress	Aishwarya Rai	Nominated	
Screen Awards	6 January 2007	Best Comedian	Uday Chopra	Nominated	
Screen Awards	6 January 2007	Jodi No. 1	Aishwarya Rai and Hrithik Roshan	Nominated	
Screen Awards	6 January 2007	Best Choreography	Shiamak Davar (for "Dhoom Again")	Won	
Screen Awards	6 January 2007	Best Action	Allan Amin	Nominated	
Screen Awards	6 January 2007	Best Special Effects	Tata Elxsi	Nominated	
Filmfare Awards	17 February 2007	Best Film	Dhoom 2	Nominated	
Filmfare Awards	17 February 2007	Best Director	Sanjay Gadhvi	Nominated	
Filmfare Awards	17 February 2007	Best Actor	Hrithik Roshan	Won	
Filmfare Awards	17 February 2007	Best Actress	Aishwarya Rai	Nominated	
Filmfare Awards	17 February 2007	Best Music Director	Pritam	Nominated	
Filmfare Awards	17 February 2007	Best Background Score	Salim–Sulaiman	Nominated	
Filmfare Awards	17 February 2007	Best Special Effects	Tata Elxsi	Nominated	
Filmfare Awards	17 February 2007	Best Action	Allan Amin	Nominated	
Stardust Awards	18 February 2007	Actor of the Year – Male	Hrithik Roshan	Nominated	
Stardust Awards	18 February 2007	Actor of the Year – Female	Aishwarya Rai	Won	
Stardust Awards	18 February 2007	Hottest Young Filmmaker	Sanjay Gadhvi	Won	
Zee Cine Awards	1 April 2007	Best Actor – Male	Hrithik Roshan	Nominated	
Zee Cine Awards	1 April 2007	Best Choreography	Shiamak Davar (for "Dhoom Again")	Nominated	
Zee Cine Awards	1 April 2007	Best Action	Allan Amin	Nominated	
Bollywood Movie Awards	26 May 2007	Best Actor	Hrithik Roshan	Won	
Bollywood Movie Awards	26 May 2007	Best Actress	Aishwarya Rai	Nominated	
Bollywood Movie Awards	26 May 2007	Best Comic Actor	Uday Chopra	Nominated	
Bollywood Movie Awards	26 May 2007	Best Cinematography	Nirav Shah and Vikas Sivaraman	Won	
IIFA Awards	7–9 June 2007	Best Film	Dhoom 2	Nominated	
IIFA Awards	7–9 June 2007	Best Actress	Aishwarya Rai	Nominated	
IIFA Awards	7–9 June 2007	Best Supporting Actress	Bipasha Basu	Nominated	
IIFA Awards	7–9 June 2007	Best Performance in a Comic Role	Uday Chopra	Nominated	
IIFA Awards	7–9 June 2007	Best Performance in a Negative Role	Hrithik Roshan	Nominated	
IIFA Awards	7–9 June 2007	Most Glamorous Star	Aishwarya Rai and Hrithik Roshan	Won	
IIFA Awards	7–9 June 2007	Best Music Director	Pritam	Nominated	
IIFA Awards	7–9 June 2007	Best Lyricist	Sameer (for "Krazy Kiya Re")	Nominated	
IIFA Awards	7–9 June 2007	Best Female Playback Singer	Sunidhi Chauhan (for "Krazy Kiya Re")	Nominated	
IIFA Awards	7–9 June 2007	Best Story	Aditya Chopra	Nominated	
IIFA Awards	7–9 June 2007	Best Screenplay	Vijay Krishna Acharya	Nominated	
IIFA Awards	7–9 June 2007	Best Costume Design	Anaita Shroff Adajania	Won	
IIFA Awards	7–9 June 2007	Best Makeup	G. A. James	Won	
MTV India Style Awards	26 October 2007	Most Stylish Film	Dhoom 2	Won	
MTV India Style Awards	26 October 2007	Most Stylish Actor – Male	Hrithik Roshan	Won	
MTV India Style Awards	26 October 2007	Most Stylish Actor – Female	Aishwarya Rai	Won	
MTV India Style Awards	26 October 2007	Most Stylish New Look	Hrithik Roshan	Won	
MTV India Style Awards	26 October 2007	Most Stylish Body	Hrithik Roshan	Won	
MTV India Style Awards	26 October 2007	Most Stylish Couple	Aishwarya Rai and Hrithik Roshan	Won	
MTV India Style Awards	26 October 2007	Most Stylish Song in A Film	Shiamak Davar (for "Dhoom Again")	Won	
MTV India Style Awards	26 October 2007	Most Stylish Bollywood Designer	Anaita Shroff Adajania	Won	

== Home media ==
Dhoom 2 was released in DVD format in February 2007 by Yash Raj Films in all regions as a two-disc set and for region 1 as a single-disc set. The film was released on Blu-ray in December 2009.

== See also ==
- List of highest-grossing Bollywood films
- List of Bollywood films of 2006
