= Dhoom =

2004 Indian film by Sanjay Gadhvi

- Theatrical release poster
- Directed by: Sanjay Gadhvi
- Written by: Vijay Krishna Acharya
- Story by: Aditya Chopra
- Produced by: Aditya Chopra
- Starring: Abhishek Bachchan; John Abraham; Uday Chopra; Esha Deol; Rimi Sen
- Cinematography: Nirav Shah
- Edited by: Rameshwar S. Bhagat
- Music by: Songs: Pritam; Score: Salim–Sulaiman
- Production company: Yash Raj Films
- Distributed by: Yash Raj Films
- Release date: 27 August 2004
- Running time: 129 minutes
- Country: India
- Language: Hindi
- Budget: est.₹11 crore
- Box office: est.₹72.5 crore

Dhoom (transl. Blast) is a 2004 Indian Hindi-language action thriller film directed by Sanjay Gadhvi and produced by Aditya Chopra, who wrote the story with the script by Vijay Krishna Acharya, under Yash Raj Films. The film stars Abhishek Bachchan, John Abraham, Uday Chopra, Esha Deol and Rimi Sen. It is the first installment of the Dhoom franchise. The cinematography and editing were handled by Nirav Shah and Rameshwar S. Bhagat, while the soundtrack and score were composed by Pritam and Salim–Sulaiman respectively.

Dhoom was the first action film produced by Yash Raj Films since Yash Chopra's Vijay. The film revolves around a gang of robbers on motorbikes, led by Kabir (John Abraham), who carry out robberies in Mumbai, while a cop Jai Dixit (Abhishek Bachchan) and a motorbike dealer Ali Akbar Fateh Khan (Uday Chopra) are assigned to stop Kabir and his gang.

Dhoom was released on 27 August 2004 to mixed reviews from critics with praise for its performances, action sequences and soundtrack, but criticism for its script and it was negatively compared to other Hollywood franchises like Fast and Furious, Death Race, and Ocean's. The film became a commercial success by grossing over ₹290 million (US$3.1 million) in India, thus becoming the third highest-grossing Indian film of 2004. It also achieved cult status over the years since its release.

At the 50th Filmfare Awards, Dhoom received 6 nominations, including Best Film, Best Villain (John Abraham) and Best Music Director (Pritam), and won 2 awards – Best Editing and Best Sound Design.

The film spawned a film series with its sequels titled Dhoom 2 and Dhoom 3, where Abhishek Bachchan and Uday Chopra reprise their roles as Jai Dixit and Ali Akbar Khan.

== Plot ==
Kabir Sharma and his motorcycle gang carry out robberies in banks and other public places in Mumbai, causing chaos for the police. A.C.P Jai Dixit is assigned to investigate the case, where he seeks the help of Ali Akbar Fateh Khan, a local bike dealer, and creates a plan to trap the gang, but to no avail. Kabir taunts Jai, claiming that he cannot catch him even if he was right in front of him. Kabir is proven correct and Jai's inability causes him to part ways with Ali.

Kabir Sharma lures Ali into his gang as a substitute for Rohit, a member of Kabir's gang, who was killed by Jai. Ali falls in love with Sheena, another member of the gang. The gang plans their next and final heist in Goa before parting ways. Kabir and his gang rob a casino on New Year's Eve, but Kabir realizes that Jai led him into a trap. It is revealed that Ali was actually working with Jai, and a fight ensues.

Kabir manages to escape and goes back to the gang's truck, where Ali has kept Sheena hostage. Kabir beats up Ali for his betrayal, but Jai arrives and saves Ali. Kabir and his gang, except Sheena, escape with Jai and Ali chasing after them. Jai and Ali eliminate the gang and corner Kabir. Rather than letting Jai arrest him, Kabir Sharma kills himself by riding his bike over the edge of a cliff. Later, Jai and Ali argue with each other in a friendly way.

== Cast ==
- Abhishek Bachchan as A.C.P Jai Dixit
- Uday Chopra as Sub Inspector Ali Akbar Fateh Khan
- John Abraham as Kabir Sharma
- Esha Deol as Sheena Rai, only female member in Kabir's gang
- Rimi Sen as Sweety J. Dixit, Jai's wife
- Manoj Joshi as Shekhar Sharma
- Aarav Chowdhary as Rahul, Kabir's second-in-command
- Farid Amiri as Tony
- Mehul Bhojak as Manu
- Rohit Chopra as Rohit
- Palash Dutta as Chottu
- Sanjay Keni as Munna
- Ajay Pande as Vinod
- Ayesha Raza as Sunaina
- Yusuf Hussain as Commissioner of Police
- Tata Young as herself in an item number "Dhoom Dhoom" (cameo appearance)

== Production ==
Aditya Chopra initially had car chases in mind instead of bikes, but Sanjay Gadhvi convinced him otherwise as the rider's faces can be seen, and he had a craze for bikes in his youth.

== Soundtrack ==
Pritam composed the songs for Dhoom while Salim–Sulaiman composed the original score. The title track "Dhoom Dhoom" was released in a remixed version song by the Thai-American singer Tata Young. The song and its music video featuring Tata Young proved to be a major hit in India during 2004 and 2005. The original song was sung by Sunidhi Chauhan. Other tracks on the soundtrack included "Dilbara", "Shikdum", and "Salaame". The lyrics were penned by Sameer. According to the Indian trade website Box Office India, with around 22,00,000 units sold, this film's soundtrack album was the year's third highest-selling.

== Reception ==
=== Box office ===
Dhoom was a commercial success at the box office and ended up netting about Rs. 4.5 crores from the Mumbai circuit in 2004. Its gross net amount in India was ₹29 crore (US$3.1 million), and its lifetime worldwide adjusted gross is ₹72.5 crore (US$7.7 million). Overseas gross of Dhoom stands at US$2 million with its U.S. gross at $330,400.

=== Critical response ===
Rajesh Karkera of Rediff.com said that "Dhoom does have a few loopholes but the film's fast-paced energy is more than enough to ensure your eyes don't stir from the screen for two-and-a-half hours", on the performance side, Chopra "steals the show", Bachchan is "impressive as the cool and confident cop. Abraham stalks though his role with ease. Deol and Sen only need to look beautiful in their limited presence in this sweat 'n' leather flick". Chitra Mahesh from The Hindu said that the film takes the genre of The Fast and the Furious, Ocean's Eleven and similar others, and wrote that "the actions scenes are extremely well done with zooms and pacy editing, while the music is more raucous than melodious". Appreciating the acting, she said, "Chopra is delightful. Bachchan as Jai does his role with style and grit and is proving to be a wonderful actor. Abraham looks terrific and suits the role of the mean-but-savvy thief".

Time Out critic stated: "Shamelessly ripping off plot ideas and entire sequences from Tango & Cash, Lethal Weapon, The Fast and Furious, Ocean's Eleven and Thelma and Louise, this energetic and surprisingly enjoyable nonsense zooms along at full-throttle, braking only for the peppy songs". Rating 3 out of 5, David Parkinson from Radio Times called it a "slick and stylish Indian drama" and wrote: "Style unashamedly triumphs over substance throughout, but the story rattles along and the set pieces are very slickly staged ... this rousing adventure owes as much to Hollywood and Hong Kong as it does to the crime classics of the 1970s". Omar Ahmed from Empire rated 2 in 5 and said that "Clearly regarding itself as Bollywood's answer to The Fast and The Furious, director Gadhvi's latest marks a departure for studio Yash Raj Films. Sadly, it's not the good kind of departure, with the studio abandoning its usually innovative approach and replacing it with an anxious attempt to blind its audience with style ... Another film that falls into the classic trap of trying to beat Hollywood at its own game instead of focusing on its primary strength – cultural uniqueness", but opined that the actors' performances are remarkable.

Taran Adarsh of IndiaFM rated 1.5 out of 5, and said: "Dhoom has gloss, but no substance. Dhoom has style, but no script. Dhoom has thrills in abundance, but the outcome is least exciting. In short, Dhoom ranks amongst YRF's weakest films" and that the film relies "too heavily on thrills", the bike chase in the story are "far more interesting than the story itself. In fact, all you remember at the end of the show are some expertly-executed chases [Allan Amin], not the drama"; the film also seems to take inspirations from The Fast and The Furious and Biker Boyz. Calling Dhoom a "testosterone-overdose", Anupama Chopra of India Today wrote that "Dhoom is adolescent heaven-fast bikes, hot babes, tons of kick-ass action with no-strings-attached ... But there are lots of trendy split screenshots of shiny bikes burning rubber and fast-paced stunts involving boats and trucks. Not to mention sexy songs with water hoses. Acting isn't the point here either. The performances are pure posture."

== Awards and nominations ==
Award	Ceremony date	Category	Recipients	Results	Ref.
Screen Awards	12 January 2005	Best Comedian	Uday Chopra	Nominated	
Screen Awards	12 January 2005	Best Music Director	Pritam	Nominated	
Screen Awards	12 January 2005	Best Background Music	Salim–Sulaiman	Won	
Screen Awards	12 January 2005	Best Cinematography	Nirav Shah	Nominated	
Screen Awards	12 January 2005	Best Editing	Rameshwar S. Bhagat	Won	
Screen Awards	12 January 2005	Best Sound Design	Dwarak Warrier	Nominated	
Screen Awards	12 January 2005	Best Action	Allan Amin	Nominated	
Global Indian Film Awards	25 January 2005	Best Comedian	Uday Chopra	Nominated	
Global Indian Film Awards	25 January 2005	Best Music Director	Pritam	Won	
Global Indian Film Awards	25 January 2005	Best Female Playback Singer	Sunidhi Chauhan (for "Dhoom Machale Dhoom")	Won	
Global Indian Film Awards	25 January 2005	Best Editing	Rameshwar S. Bhagat	Won	
Stardust Awards	20 February 2005	Breakthrough Performance – Female	Rimi Sen	Nominated	
Filmfare Awards	26 February 2005	Best Film	Dhoom	Nominated	
Filmfare Awards	26 February 2005	Best Villain	John Abraham	Nominated	
Filmfare Awards	26 February 2005	Best Music Director	Pritam	Nominated	
Filmfare Awards	26 February 2005	Best Female Playback Singer	Sunidhi Chauhan (for "Dhoom Machale Dhoom")	Nominated	
Filmfare Awards	26 February 2005	Best Editing	Rameshwar S. Bhagat	Won	
Filmfare Awards	26 February 2005	Best Sound Design	Dwarak Warrier	Won	
Zee Cine Awards	26 March 2005	Best Villain	John Abraham	Won	
Zee Cine Awards	26 March 2005	Best Comedian	Uday Chopra	Nominated	
Zee Cine Awards	26 March 2005	Best Female Playback Singer	Sunidhi Chauhan (for "Dhoom Machale Dhoom")	Won	
Zee Cine Awards	26 March 2005	Best Song of the Year	"Dhoom Machale Dhoom"	Won	
Zee Cine Awards	26 March 2005	Best Dialogue	Vijay Krishna Acharya	Nominated	
Zee Cine Awards	26 March 2005	Best Background Score	Salim–Sulaiman	Nominated	
Zee Cine Awards	26 March 2005	Best Costume Design	Anaita Shroff Adajania	Nominated	
Zee Cine Awards	26 March 2005	Best Editing	Rameshwar S. Bhagat	Nominated	
Zee Cine Awards	26 March 2005	Best Action	Allan Amin	Won	
Zee Cine Awards	26 March 2005	Best Special Effects	Pankaj Khandpur	Nominated	
Zee Cine Awards	26 March 2005	Best Sound Re-Recording	Leslie Fernandes	Nominated	
Zee Cine Awards	26 March 2005	Best Audiography	Dwarak Warrier	Nominated	
Zee Cine Awards	26 March 2005	Best Film Processing	Yash Raj Films	Nominated	
Bollywood Movie Awards	30 April 2005	Best Comedian	Uday Chopra	Nominated	
Bollywood Movie Awards	30 April 2005	Best Villain	John Abraham	Won	
Bollywood Movie Awards	30 April 2005	Best Female Playback Singer	Sunidhi Chauhan (for "Dhoom Machale Dhoom")	Won	
IIFA Awards	9–11 June 2005	Best Film	Dhoom	Nominated	
IIFA Awards	9–11 June 2005	Best Supporting Actress	Esha Deol	Nominated	
IIFA Awards	9–11 June 2005	Best Villain	John Abraham	Won	
IIFA Awards	9–11 June 2005	Best Comedian	Uday Chopra	Nominated	
IIFA Awards	9–11 June 2005	Best Music Director	Pritam	Nominated	
IIFA Awards	9–11 June 2005	Best Female Playback Singer	Sunidhi Chauhan (for "Dhoom Machale Dhoom")	Won	
IIFA Awards	9–11 June 2005	Best Action	Allan Amin	Won	

== In popular culture ==
Several bank robberies happened shortly after the film released in the similar style as shown in the film.
