= Vijay Krishna Acharya =

Indian filmmaker

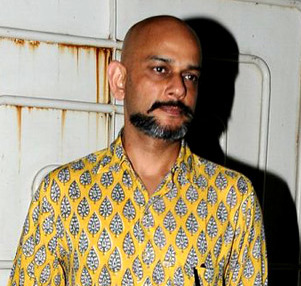
- Born: Kanpur, Uttar Pradesh, India
- Education: Kirori Mal College
- Occupation: Film director
- Years active: 2004–present
- Known for: Dhoom 3
- Spouse: Anusheh Khan

Vijay Krishna Acharya is an Indian film director, screenwriter, dialogue writer known for his works in Hindi films and television shows.

== Personal life ==
Acharya is married to Anusheh Khan, sister of director Kabir Khan.

== Career ==
He began his career as a scriptwriter after his work on the film Dhoom franchise. His directorial debut was the film Tashan which opened to negative reviews. Though his second attempt at film directing Dhoom 3 which was the third installment of the Dhoom franchise, went on to gross ₹4 billion (US$42 million) worldwide in just ten days, to become the highest-grossing Bollywood film of all time in international markets at the time and as of September 2020, it is the twelfth highest-grossing Indian film of all time. It was the 78th highest-grossing film of 2013 worldwide. The film was screened during the 2014 International Film Festival of India in the Celebrating Dance in Indian cinema section. The film won the Telstra People's Choice Award at the 2014 Indian Film Festival of Melbourne.

His first independent spoof was Channel Mast on VI TV, by the late director Sudhanshu Mishra. His other spoofs include Ramkhilavan CM and Family, Public Hai Sab Jaanti Hai and Krishna Sharma CA, which later gave shape to Krishna Arjun. He has written scripts for and directed Hindi shows including Just Mohabbat, Life Nahin Hai Laddoo, Son Pari, Shaka Laka Boom Boom and Jassi Jaissi Koi Nahin.

== Filmography ==
Year	Title	Director	Story	Screenplay	Dialogues
2004	Dhoom	No	No	Yes	Yes
2006	Dhoom 2	No	No	Yes	Yes
2007	Guru	No	No	No	Yes
2008	Tashan	Yes	Yes	Yes	Yes
2010	Raavan	No	No	No	Yes
2013	Dhoom 3	Yes	Yes	Yes	Yes
2018	Thugs of Hindostan	Yes	Yes	Yes	Yes
2023	The Great Indian Family	Yes	Yes	Yes	Yes
