= Sanjay Gadhvi =

Indian filmmaker (1965–2023)

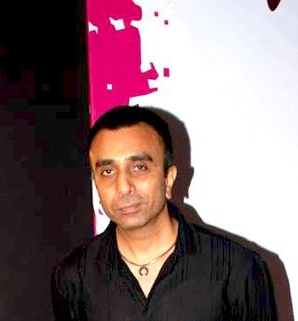
- Gadhvi in 2011
- Born: 22 November 1965; Bombay, Maharashtra, India
- Died: 19 November 2023 (aged 57); Mumbai, Maharashtra, India
- Occupations: Film director; writer
- Years active: 2000–2020
- Known for: Dhoom, Dhoom 2
- Spouse: Gina
- Children: 2

Sanjay Gadhvi (22 November 1965 – 19 November 2023) was an Indian film director and writer, who was known for the first two instalments of the Dhoom series.

== Early life ==
Sanjay Gadhvi was born to Manubhai Gadhvi, a well-known figure in Gujarati folk literature. His father moved into Mumbai's first 14-floor skyscraper on Peddar Road before he was born. As a child he studied at Campion School and was friends with industrialist Kumar Mangalam Birla.

== Career ==
Gadhvi's career began by assisting Anant Balani with Tu Hi Bataa, starring Arjun Rampal and Raveena Tandon. The film was never released. He made his directorial debut with Tere Liye (2000), which performed poorly. His first film with Yash Raj Films was Mere Yaar Ki Shaadi Hai (2002), which enjoyed moderate success. He first gained attention directing the action thriller Dhoom in 2004, followed by its sequel Dhoom 2. The films starred Abhishek Bachchan, Uday Chopra, and Rimi Sen, with Hrithik Roshan, Aishwarya Rai, and Bipasha Basu joining the cast for the sequel.

== Death ==
Gadhvi died from a heart attack in Mumbai, on 19 November 2023, at the age of 57.

== Awards ==
Gadhvi won the 2007 Stardust Awards in "Hottest Young Film Maker title" category for Dhoom 2 (2006).

== Filmography ==
Year	Title	Director	Writer	Ref.
2001	Tere Liye	Yes		
2002	Mere Yaar Ki Shaadi Hai	Yes	Yes	
2004	Dhoom	Yes		
2006	Dhoom 2	Yes		
2008	Kidnap	Yes		
2012	Ajab Gazabb Love	Yes		
2020	Operation Parindey	Yes		
