= Rani Mukerji filmography =

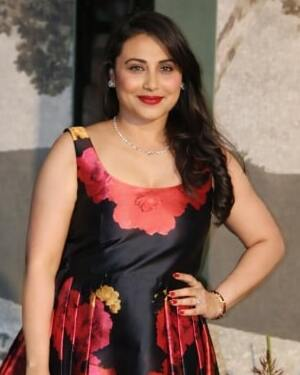
Mukerji in 2025

Hindi film actress Rani Mukerji made her screen debut in Biyer Phool (1996), a Bengali film directed by her father Ram Mukherjee. Her first leading role was that of a rape victim in the 1996 social drama Raja Ki Aayegi Baaraat. In 1998 she received wider recognition for her role alongside Aamir Khan in the action film Ghulam, and had her breakthrough as the romantic interest of Shah Rukh Khan's character in the romantic drama Kuch Kuch Hota Hai. The latter earned Mukerji her first Filmfare Award in the Best Supporting Actress category. She followed this by playing the leading lady in several films, including Hello Brother (1999) and Nayak: The Real Hero (2001), none of which helped propel her career forward.

Mukerji's career prospects improved in 2002 when she starred in Yash Raj Films' Saathiya, a romantic drama that gained her a Filmfare Critics Award for Best Actress. For her roles in the 2004 romantic comedy Hum Tum and the composite drama Yuva, Mukerji became the only actress to win both the Filmfare Award for Best Actress and Best Supporting Actress, respectively, in the same year. Also that year, she starred in Veer-Zaara—the highest-grossing Bollywood film of the year. In 2005, she received praise for portraying a blind, deaf and mute woman in the drama Black, and played a con woman in the crime comedy film Bunty Aur Babli. For her performance in Black, she was awarded the Best Actress and Best Actress (Critics) trophies at Filmfare. The following year, she played an unhappily married woman in the drama Kabhi Alvida Naa Kehna.

Following a leading role in the financially successful drama Ta Ra Rum Pum (2007), Mukerji starred primarily in films produced by Yash Raj Films for the next two years. None of these films performed well at the box office, after which she featured as a talent judge for the Sony Entertainment Television reality show Dance Premier League (2009). The role of a headstrong television reporter in the 2011 thriller No One Killed Jessica earned her another Best Supporting Actress trophy at Filmfare, and the film proved to be her first box office success in four years. In 2012, she portrayed a grieving mother in the supernatural thriller Talaash: The Answer Lies Within and in 2014 she appeared as a police officer in the crime thriller Mardaani. Following a four-year hiatus, Mukerji played a woman suffering from Tourette syndrome in Hichki (2018). She reprised her role in the sequel Mardaani 2 (2019), which was also a commercial success. In 2023, she starred as the real-life character of a woman whose children were taken away by the Norwegian Child Welfare Services in the drama Mrs. Chatterjee vs Norway, which performed averagely at the box office and won her another Filmfare Critics Award for Best Actress and her first National Film Award for Best Actress in a Leading Role. She reprised her role again in Mardaani 3 (2026) which performed well at the box office.

== Films ==
Key
†	Denotes films that have not yet been released

Year	Title	Role	Notes	Ref.
1996	Biyer Phool	Mili Chatterjee	Bengali film	
1996	Raja Ki Aayegi Baaraat	Mala	Credited as Ranee	
1998	Ghulam	Alisha		
1998	Kuch Kuch Hota Hai	Tina Malhotra		
1998	Mehndi	Pooja		
1999	Mann	Dancer	Special appearance in the song "Kaali Naagin Ke Jaisi"	
1999	Hello Brother	Rani		
2000	Badal	Rani		
2000	Hey Ram	Aparna Ram	Simultaneously shot in Tamil	
2000	Hadh Kar Di Aapne	Anjali Khanna		
2000	Bichhoo	Kiran Bali		
2000	Har Dil Jo Pyar Karega	Pooja Oberoi		
2000	Kahin Pyaar Na Ho Jaaye	Priya Sharma		
2001	Chori Chori Chupke Chupke	Priya Malhotra		
2001	Bas Itna Sa Khwaab Hai	Pooja Shrivastav		
2001	Nayak: The Real Hero	Manjari		
2001	Kabhi Khushi Kabhie Gham	Naina		
2002	Pyaar Diwana Hota Hai	Payal Khurana		
2002	Mujhse Dosti Karoge!	Pooja Sahani		
2002	Saathiya	Dr. Suhani Sharma Sehgal		
2002	Chalo Ishq Ladaaye	Sapna		
2003	Chalte Chalte	Priya Chopra Mathur		
2003	Chori Chori	Khushi Malhotra		
2003	Calcutta Mail	Bulbul/Reema^{[I]}		
2003	Kal Ho Naa Ho	Dancer	Special appearance in the song "Maahi Ve"	
2003	LOC: Kargil	Hema		
2004	Yuva	Shashi Biswas		
2004	Hum Tum	Rhea Prakash		
2004	Veer-Zaara	Saamiya Siddiqui		
2005	Black	Michelle McNally		
2005	Bunty Aur Babli	Vimmi "Babli" Saluja		
2005	Paheli	Lachchi Bhanwarlal		
2005	Mangal Pandey: The Rising	Heera		
2006	Kabhi Alvida Naa Kehna	Maya Talwar		
2006	Baabul	Malvika "Milli" Talwar Kapoor		
2007	Ta Ra Rum Pum	Radhika (Shona)		
2007	Laaga Chunari Mein Daag	Vibhavari/Natasha^{[I]}		
2007	Saawariya	Gulab		
2007	Om Shanti Om	Herself	Special appearance in the song "Deewangi Deewangi"	
2008	Thoda Pyaar Thoda Magic	Geeta		
2008	Rab Ne Bana Di Jodi	Herself	Special appearance in the song "Phir Milenge Chalte Chalte"	
2009	Luck by Chance	Herself	Cameo	
2009	Dil Bole Hadippa!	Veera Kaur/Veer Pratap Singh^{[II]}		
2011	No One Killed Jessica	Meera Gaity		
2012	Aiyyaa	Meenakshi Deshpande		
2012	Talaash: The Answer Lies Within	Roshni Shekhawat		
2013	Bombay Talkies	Gayatri	Segment: Ajeeb Dastaan Hai Yeh	
2014	Mardaani	Shivani Shivaji Roy		
2018	Hichki	Naina Mathur		
2018	Zero	Herself	Cameo	
2019	Mardaani 2	Shivani Shivaji Roy		
2021	Bunty Aur Babli 2	Vimmi "Babli" Trivedi		
2023	Mrs. Chatterjee vs Norway	Debika Chatterjee		
2026	Mardaani 3	Shivani Shivaji Roy		
2026	King †	TBA	Filming	

== Television ==
Year	Title	Role	Notes	Ref.
2009	Dance Premier League	Judge		
2011	C.I.D.	Meera Gaity	Episode: "Abhijeet Ke Ateet Ka Raaz"	
2013	Saraswatichandra	Herself		
2018	Yeh Hai Mohabbatein	Naina Mathur	Guest appearance	
2023	The Romantics	Herself	Documentary series	

== Documentary ==
Year	Title	Role	Notes	Ref.
2000	Bollywood im Alpenrausch	Herself	Swiss documentary film Uncredited; cameo appearance	
2002	Gambling, Gods and LSD	Herself	Canadian-Swiss documentary film Cameo appearance	
2005	The Outer World of Shah Rukh Khan	Herself	British documentary film	

== Music video appearances ==
Year	Title	Performer(s)	Role	Album	Ref.
2002	"Tera Chehra"	Adnan Sami	Girlfriend	Tera Chehra	

== Footnotes ==
^{^[I]}She played a single character who has two different names.
^{^[II]}She played the role of a woman who masquerades as a man.
^{^[III]}Bombay Talkies consisted of four short films, directed by Anurag Kashyap, Dibakar Banerjee, Zoya Akhtar and Karan Johar.

== See also ==
- List of awards and nominations received by Rani Mukerji
