= List of awards and nominations received by Rani Mukerji =

Rani Mukerji awards and nominations
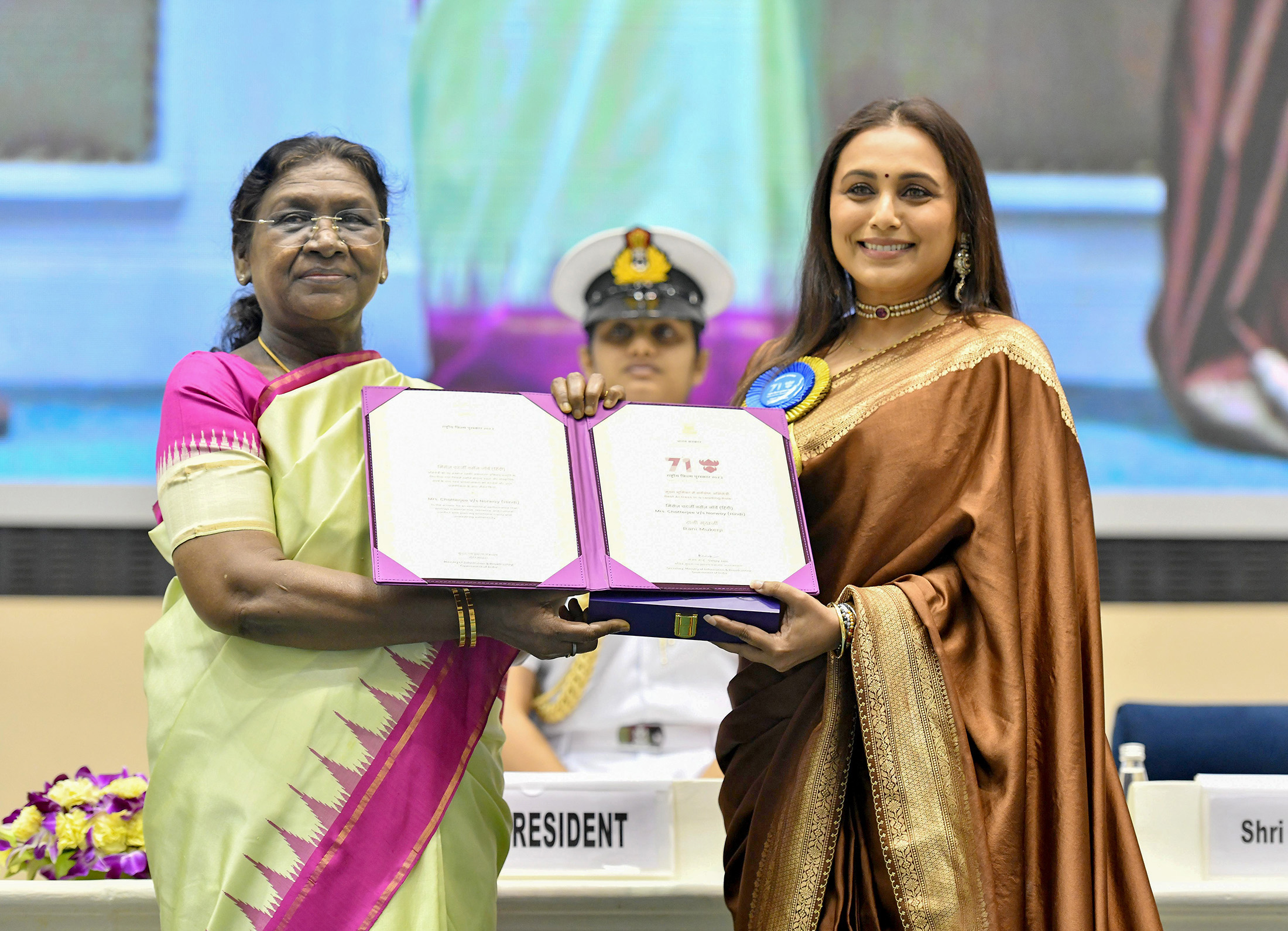
- President of India Droupadi Murmu presenting Mukerji with the National Film Award for Best Actress for Mrs Chatterjee Vs Norway
Awards and nominations
Award	Wins	Nominations
Bollywood Movie Awards	3	7
Filmfare Awards	8	21
GIFA Awards	1	2
IIFA Awards	5	10
National Film Awards	1	1
Screen Awards	7	18
Stardust Awards	2	5
Zee Cine Awards	5	14
Anandalok Puraskar Awards	5	5
Bengal Film Journalists' Association Awards	2	2
BIG Star Entertainment Awards	1	7
Lycra MTV Style Awards	1	1
Sabsey Favourite Kaun Awards	4	4
Sansui Viewer's Choice Awards	1	3
Star Guild Awards	1	3
Times of India Film Awards	0	2

Totals (Note: Certain award groups do not simply award one winner. They acknowledge several different recipients, have runners-up, and have third place. Since this is a specific recognition and is different from losing an award, runner-up mentions are considered wins in this award tally. For simplification and to avoid errors, each award in this list has been presumed to have had a prior nomination.)
- Wins: 45
- Nominations: 83

Rani Mukerji is an Indian actress who has won several awards and nominations. Known for her work in Hindi-language films, Mukerji made her film debut with a supporting role in the Bengali film Biyer Phool (1996), which was directed by her father Ram Mukherjee. She made her Hindi debut with Raja Ki Aayegi Baraat in 1996, for which she received her first award at the Star Screen Awards for Best Fresh Talent. The following year she was featured in two successful films. For her third film, Kuch Kuch Hota Hai (1998), she earned the award for Best Supporting Actress at the 44th Filmfare Awards. She won the Zee Cine Award for Best Actress in a Supporting Role and the Lux Face of the Year accolades at the Zee Cine Awards. Following this, she starred in several movies, some of which were critically and commercially successful, such as Hey Ram (2000) which was chosen as India's official entry to the Oscars and Badal (2000) which was one of the highest-grossing films of that year. For her performance in Har Dil Jo Pyar Karega (2000), she was nominated for Best Supporting Actress at the 46th Filmfare Awards and the following year Mukerji starred in Chori Chori Chupke Chupke.

Mukerji was then noted for her role in Shaad Ali's marital drama Saathiya (2002). Her portrayal of a medical student who struggles with married life at a young age in the film earned her first Filmfare Award for Best Actress nomination and she also won her first Filmfare Award for Best Actress (Critics) at the same ceremony. The role garnered her several Best Actress nominations at major award ceremonies, including organizations like, International Indian Film Academy (IIFA), Zee Cine and Screen which also bestowed her with a Special Jury Award. She again garnered critical acclaim and commercial success with Chalte Chalte (2003), Yuva (2004), Hum Tum (2004), Veer-Zaara (2004), Black (2005), Bunty Aur Babli (2005), Kabhi Alvida Naa Kehna (2006), Ta Ra Rum Pum (2007), Laaga Chunari Mein Daag (2007), Saawariya (2007), No One Killed Jessica (2011), Talaash: The Answer Lies Within (2012), Mardaani (2014), Hichki (2018) and Mardaani 2 (2019). All these movies earned her nominations and wins at major award ceremonies, of which Hum Tum (2004) and Black (2005) won her two Filmfare Awards for Best Actress and the latter also gave her the Filmfare Award for Best Actress (Critics). She won the Filmfare Award for Best Supporting Actress for Yuva (2004) and No One Killed Jessica (2011) respectively. She also received the Star Screen Award Jodi No. 1 for two consecutive years for her pairing opposite Abhishek Bachchan in Bunty Aur Babli (2005) and Shah Rukh Khan in Kabhi Alvida Naa Kehna (2006).

She got her Rajiv Gandhi Award in 2004, a national honor. Apart from winning merit awards based on her performances, Mukerji was awarded various non-acting honors at major award functions. These include being the Celebrity Model of the Year at the Idea Zee F Awards as well as the Most Stylish Actor at the MTV Lycra Awards. She has topped every Top Ten Actresses’ Listing by Filmfare for several consecutive years, often she is cited as the Ten Most Powerful Names of Bollywood, sometimes being the only woman making it to that list from year to year. Mukerji was chosen as the Best Television Personality of the Year for judging the show Dance Premier League (2009). IIFA-FICCI Frames has named her as one of the ten most powerful entertainers of the decade. In 2011, she was bestowed with the greatest honor, the Actor of the Decade Award, by the India Leadership Conclave's Indian Affairs's Business Leadership Awards as well as by the Kelvinator Gr8 Women Achievers Club. In 2013, Mukerji was honored by the US Council on the day of Barack Obama's inauguration into office for Contribution to Indian Cinema and TSR National Film Awards recognized her as Bollywood's Ever Shining Star. She was commemorated with Excellence in Acting at GQ India's Men of the Year Award that same year. In 2015, Mukerji was felicitated by The National Institute of Gender Justice towards her contribution to gender sensitization. In 2017, she was honored by the Prime Minister of Mauritius, Pravind Jugnauth, for her Outstanding Contribution to Cinema during Mauritius Cinema Week in celebration of 50 years of the country's independence from British rule.

== Anandalok Puraskar Awards ==
The Anandalok Puraskar Awards ceremony is one of the most prominent film events for Bengali Cinema in India. Mukerji has received five awards over the past for the Hindi section.

Year	Category	Film	Result	Ref.
2003	Best Actress	Saathiya	Won	
2005	Best Actress	Hum Tum	Won	
2006	Best Actress	Black	Won	
2010	Best Actress (Critics)	Dil Bole Hadippa!	Won	
2011	Best Actress	No One Killed Jessica	Won	

== Bengal Film Journalists' Association Awards ==
The Bengal Film Journalists' Association Awards were founded by the oldest Association of Film critics in 1937. It is one of the most prestigious awards held in India. Mukerji has received two awards.

Year	Category	Film	Result	Ref.
2003	Best Actress (Hindi)	Saathiya	Won	
2006	Best Actress (Hindi)	Black	Won	

== BIG Star Entertainment Awards ==
The BIG Star Entertainment Awards is an awards ceremony for the Hindi film industry. Mukerji has won one award from seven nomination.

Year	Category	Film	Result	Ref.
2010	Film Actor of the Decade - Female	—N/a	Nominated	
2011	Most Entertaining Film Actor – Female	No One Killed Jessica	Nominated	
2011	Most Entertaining Actress in a Social Role	No One Killed Jessica	Won	
2013	Most Entertaining Actress in a Social Role	Bombay Talkies	Nominated	
2014	Most Entertaining Actress in a Social Role	Mardaani	Nominated	
2014	Most Entertaining Film Actor – Female	Mardaani	Nominated	
2014	Most Entertaining Actress in a Thriller Role	Mardaani	Nominated	

== Bollywood Movie Awards ==
The Bollywood Movie Awards was an annual film award ceremony held in Long Island, New York, United States between 1999 and 2007 celebrating films and actors from the Bollywood film industry. Mukerji has won three awards from seven nominations.

Year	Category	Film	Result	Ref.
2003	Best Actress	Saathiya	Nominated	
2003	Best Actress (Critics)	Saathiya	Won	
2004	Best Actress	Chalte Chalte	Nominated	
2005	Best Actress	Hum Tum	Won	
2005	Best Supporting Actress	Yuva	Won	
2006	Best Actress	Black	Nominated	
2007	Best Actress	Kabhi Alvida Naa Kehna	Nominated	

== Filmfare Awards ==
The Filmfare Awards are presented annually by The Times Group to honor both artistic and technical excellence of professionals in the Hindi language film industry of India. Mukerji has won eight awards (most for any actress). Mukerji has been nominated 21 times in various categories, making her the most-nominated performer in the female categories. Mukerji is the first and only actress to have ever won both the Best Actress and Best Supporting Actress trophies in a single year (2005). She is also the first and only actress to date to win both the Best Actress and Best Actress (Critics) awards during the same year (2006) for the same film.

Year	Film	Result	Ref.⁣
Best Actress
2003	Saathiya	Nominated	
2004	Chalte Chalte	Nominated	
2005	Hum Tum	Won	
2006	Black	Won	
2006	Bunty Aur Babli	Nominated	
2007	Kabhi Alvida Naa Kehna	Nominated	
2008	Laaga Chunari Mein Daag	Nominated	
2015	Mardaani	Nominated	
2019	Hichki	Nominated	
2020	Mardaani 2	Nominated	
2024	Mrs. Chatterjee vs Norway	Nominated	
Best Supporting Actress
1999	Kuch Kuch Hota Hai	Won	
2001	Har Dil Jo Pyar Karega	Nominated	
2005	Veer-Zaara	Nominated	
2005	Yuva	Won	
2008	Saawariya	Nominated	
2012	No One Killed Jessica	Won	
2013	Talaash: The Answer Lies Within	Nominated	
Best Actress (Critics)
2003	Saathiya	Won (Note: Tied with Manisha Koirala for Company.)	
2006	Black	Won	
2024	Mrs. Chatterjee vs Norway	Won (Note: Tied with Shefali Shah for Three of Us.)	

== Global Indian Film Awards ==
The Global Indian Film Awards was an award ceremony for the Hindi film industry held abroad in 2005 and 2007, no longer held now. Mukerji has received one award from two nominations.

Year	Category	Film	Result	Ref.
2005	Best Actress	Hum Tum	Won	
2005	Best Actress in a Supporting Role	Veer-Zaara	Nominated	
2007	Best Actress	Kabhi Alvida Naa Kehna	Nominated	

== Indian Film Festival of Melbourne ==
The Indian Film Festival of Melbourne (IFFM) is an annual Indian film festival based in Melbourne, Australia. It is presented by Film Victoria and the State Government of Victoria, and produced by Mind Blowing Films, a Melbourne-based distributor of Indian cinema across Australia and New Zealand. Founded in 2010, the festival was previously called Bollywood & Beyond, and from 2012 was re-established as an initiative of the Victorian Coalition Government Victorian Government that aims to strengthen ties between the Indian film industry and Victoria.

Year	Category	Film	Result	Ref.
2018	Best Actress	Hichki	Won	
2018	Excellence in Cinema	—N/a	Won	
2023	Best Performance Female (Feature)	Mrs. Chatterjee vs Norway	Won	

== Indian Television Academy Awards ==
The Indian Television Academy Awards, also known as the ITA Awards, is an annual award ceremony organised by the Indian Television Academy to honour excellence in Hindi-language television and OTT platforms.

Year	Category	Work	Result	Ref.
2013	GR8! Women Achievers	Excellence in Versatility	Won	
2023	ITA Scroll of Honour	—N/a	Won	

== Indian Telly Awards ==
The Indian Telly Awards is an annual award for excellence both on-screen and behind-the-scenes of Hindi-language television.

Year	Category	Work	Result	Ref.
2009	Best Television Personality of the Year	Dance Premier League	Won	

== International Indian Film Academy Awards ==
The International Indian Film Academy Awards are presented annually by the International Indian Film Academy to honour both artistic and technical excellence of professionals in Bollywood, the Hindi language film industry. Mukerji has won five awards from thirteen nominations, including a special nomination for Star of the Decade – Female. She holds the record for the most wins in the Best Actress category, leading with four wins.

Year	Category	Film	Result	Ref.
2003	Best Actress	Saathiya	Nominated	
2004	Best Actress	Chalte Chalte	Nominated	
2005	Best Actress	Hum Tum	Won	
2005	Best Supporting Actress	Veer-Zaara	Won	
2005	Best Supporting Actress	Yuva	Nominated	
2006	Best Actress	Black	Won	
2006	Best Actress	Bunty Aur Babli	Nominated	
2007	Best Actress	Kabhi Alvida Naa Kehna	Won	
2008	Best Supporting Actress	Saawariya	Nominated	
2009	Star of the Decade – Female	—N/a	Nominated	
2015	Best Actress	Mardaani	Nominated	
2019	Best Actress	Hichki	Nominated	
2024	Best Actress	Mrs. Chatterjee vs Norway	Won	

== National Film Awards ==
Year	Category	Film	Result	Ref.
2025	Best Actress	Mrs. Chatterjee vs Norway	Won	

== Sabsey Favourite Kaun Awards ==
The Sabse Favourite Kaun Awards were presented annually by Star Gold. The nominees and awardees were decided by public voting after a voting campaign spanning across 30 cities all over India. Votes are usually sent via the official website and through SMS. The awards were discontinued after 2010. Mukerji holds the record for the most awards, all four wins were consecutive wins.

Year	Category	Film	Result	Ref.
2005	Sabsey Favourite Heroine	Hum Tum & Veer-Zaara	Won	
2006	Sabsey Favourite Heroine	Black	Won	
2007	Sabsey Favourite Heroine	Kabhi Alvida Naa Kehna	Won	
2008	Sabsey Favourite Heroine	Ta Ra Rum Pum & Laaga Chunari Mein Daag	Won (Note: Tied with Katrina Kaif for Singh Is Kinng)	

== Sansui Viewer's Choice Awards ==
The Sansui Viewer's Choice Awards was an annual awards ceremony presented to the Bollywood film industry, which were boycotted by Shah Rukh Khan in 2005, now no longer held. Mukerji has won one award from three nominations.

Year	Category	Film	Result	Ref.
2001	Best Supporting Actress	Har Dil Jo Pyar Karega	Nominated	
2003	Best Actress (Jury)	Saathiya	Won	
2003	Best Actress	Saathiya	Nominated	
2004	Best Actress	Chalte Chalte	Nominated	

== Screen Awards ==
The Screen Awards is the only award ceremony in India to be involved with the Executive Director and the Governor of the Academy of Motion Picture Arts and Sciences. They are presented annually to honor professional excellence in the Hindi language film industry of India. Mukerji has garnered seven wins from eighteen nominations, including two wins and one nomination for Jodi No. 1 (with Abhishek Bachchan in 2005 and 2006 and Shahrukh Khan in 2007).

Year	Category	Film	Result	Ref.
1997	Best Fresh Talent	Raja Ki Aayegi Baraat	Won	
1999	Best Actress	Ghulam	Nominated	
2003	Best Actress	Saathiya	Nominated	
2003	Special Jury Award	Saathiya	Won	
2004	Best Actress	Chalte Chalte	Nominated	
2005	Best Actress	Hum Tum	Won	
2005	Best Supporting Actress	Veer-Zaara	Nominated	
2005	Best Supporting Actress	Yuva	Won	
2005	Jodi No. 1 (along with Abhishek Bachchan)	Yuva	Nominated	
2006	Best Actress	Black	Won	
2006	Jodi No. 1 (along with Abhishek Bachchan)	Bunty Aur Babli	Won	
2007	Jodi No. 1 (along with Shahrukh Khan)	Kabhi Alvida Naa Kehna	Won	
2012	Best Actress	No One Killed Jessica	Nominated	
2013	Best Supporting Actress	Talaash: The Answer Lies Within	Nominated	
2015	Best Actress (Popular Choice)	Mardaani	Nominated	
2015	Best Ensemble Cast	Mardaani	Nominated	
2015	Best Actress	Mardaani	Nominated	
2018	Best Actress	Hichki	Nominated	

== Star Guild Awards ==
The Star Guild Awards, also known as Producers Guild Film Awards, are presented by the Bollywood film industry to honor and recognize the professional excellence of their peers. Mukerji has received one award from five nominations.

Year	Category	Film	Result	Ref.
2006	Best Actress in a Supporting Role	Veer-Zaara	Nominated	
2006	Best Actress in a Leading Role	Hum Tum	Nominated	
2006	Best Actress in a Leading Role	Black	Won	
2008	Best Actress in a Leading Role	Laaga Chunari Mein Daag	Nominated	
2012	Best Actress in a Leading Role	No One Killed Jessica	Nominated	
2015	Best Actress in a Leading Role	Mardaani	Nominated	

== Stardust Awards ==
The Stardust Awards is an award ceremony presented annually by Stardust magazine. Mukerji has won two awards from ten nominations. The first ceremony was held in 2004 for films released in 2003, and the last awards ceremony happened in 2016, with several discontinued, intermittent and special Awards.

Year	Category	Film	Result	Ref.
2004	Star of the Year – Female	Chalte Chalte	Nominated	
2005	Star of the Year – Female	Hum Tum	Nominated	
2005	Best Supporting Actress	Yuva	Nominated	
2006	Star of the Year – Female	Black	Won	
2006	Star of the Year – Female	Bunty Aur Babli	Nominated	
2007	Star of the Year – Female	Kabhi Alvida Naa Kehna	Nominated	
2008	Star of the Year – Female	Laaga Chunari Mein Daag	Nominated	
2008	Best Supporting Actress	Saawariya	Nominated	
2010	Star of the Year – Female	Dil Bole Hadippa!	Nominated	
2012	Best Actress – Drama	No One Killed Jessica	Nominated	
2014	Best Thriller – Action Actress	Mardaani	Won	

== Times of India Film Awards ==
The Times of India Film Awards is envisioned to be popular choice awards where Bollywood fans across the world vote on the nomination categories to determine the winners of the popular choice categories.

Year	Category	Film	Result	Ref.
2013	Best Actress in a Comedy	Aiyyaa	Nominated	
2013	Best Actress in a Supporting Role	Talaash: The Answer Lies Within	Nominated	

== Zee Cine Awards ==
The Zee Cine Awards is an award ceremony for the Hindi film industry, now held abroad each year. Mukerji has won four awards from fourteen nominations.

Year	Category	Film	Result	Ref.
1999	Lux Face of the Year	Ghulam & Kuch Kuch Hota Hai	Nominated	
1999	Best Actor in a Supporting Role - Female	Kuch Kuch Hota Hai	Won	
1999	Best Actor – Female	Ghulam	Nominated	
2003	Best Actor – Female	Saathiya	Nominated	
2004	Best Actor – Female	Chalte Chalte	Nominated	
2005	Best Actor – Female	Hum Tum	Won	
2005	Best Actor in a Supporting Role – Female	Yuva	Nominated	
2006	Best Actor – Female	Black	Won	
2006	Best Actor – Female	Bunty Aur Babli	Nominated	
2007	Best Actor – Female	Kabhi Alvida Naa Kehna	Nominated	
2013	Best Actor in a Supporting Role – Female	Talaash	Nominated	
2019	Best Actor (Critics) – Female	Hichki	Nominated	
2024	Best Actor – Female	Mrs. Chatterjee vs Norway	Nominated	
2024	Best Actor (Critics) – Female	Mrs. Chatterjee vs Norway	Won	

== Other awards ==
Year	Award	Category	Work	Result	Ref.
2009	V. Shantaram Awards	Best Actress	Dil Bole Hadippa!	Won	
2013	Asiavision Awards	Excellence in Hindi Cinema	Talaash: The Answer Lies Within & Bombay Talkies	Won	
2015	Vogue Beauty Awards	Ageless Beauty	—N/a	Won	
2018	Lux Golden Rose Awards	Charismatic Beauty of the Year	Hichki	Won	
2020	Lions Gold Awards	Best Actress	Mardaani 2	Nominated	
2023	Pinkvilla Style Icons Awards	Super Stylish Role Model	—N/a	Won	
2023	Hello! Hall of Fame Awards	Outstanding Performance of the Year	Mrs Chatterjee vs Norway	Won	
2024	Pinkvilla Screen and Style Icons Awards	Star of the Year	Mrs Chatterjee vs Norway	Won	
2026	The Telegraph She Awards	The She Power Award		Won	
2026	Raj Kapoor Special Contribution Award	-	-	Won	

== Media honours ==
In addition to the industry awards, Mukerji has received various kinds of honours from noted magazines.

Year	Honour	Awarding organisation	Result	Ref.
2003	Top Ten Actresses #3	Filmfare	Won	
2003	Best Actress #2	Rediff	Won	
2004	Top Ten Actresses #1	Filmfare	Won	
2004	Ten Most Powerful Names of Bollywood #10	Filmfare	Won	
2004	Bollywood's Most Beautiful Actresses #5	Rediff	Won	
2004	Best Actress #1	Rediff	Won	
2005	Top Ten Actresses #1	Filmfare	Won	
2005	Ten Most Powerful Names of Bollywood #8	Filmfare	Won	
2005	Best Actress #1	Rediff	Won	
2006	Top Ten Actresses #1	Filmfare	Won	
2006	Ten Most Powerful Names of Bollywood #5	Filmfare	Won	
2006	Best Actress #1	Rediff	Won	
2006	Asia's Sexiest Women #36	Eastern Eye	Won	
2007	Top 10 Actresses Who Ruled Bollywood #9	Bollywood Entertainment Australia	Won	
2007	50 Most Beautiful Women #2	Femina	Won	
2007	Most Powerful Actress #5	Rediff	Won	
2007	Bollywood's Best Actresses Ever #4	Rediff	Won	
2007	Bollywood's Best Dressed Women #1	Rediff	Won	
2008	50 Most Beautiful Women #11	Femina	Won	
2008	Top Ten Most Iconic Bollywood Actresses of All Time #10	Wonderlist	Won	
2012	Best Actress #10	Rediff	Won	
2013	50 Beautiful Faces: 100 years of Indian Cinema #2	The Times of India	Won	
2014	Best Actress #7	Rediff	Won	
2018	Best Actress #10	Rediff	Won	

== National honours and recognitions ==
- 2004: Rajiv Gandhi Award for her contribution to the entertainment industry.
- 2005: Mukerji was the only actor to be invited by the Indian Prime Minister Manmohan Singh for the official banquet in honour of visiting Pakistan President General Pervez Musharraf.
- 2005: Mukerji was the guest of honour at the state dinner, in honour of the Singapore Prime Minister Lee Hsien Loong
- 2009: Mukerji was among the ten recipients of IIFA-FICCI Frames' award for Most Powerful Entertainers of the Decade.
- 2009: GQ Excellence Award for Achievement in Films.
- 2011: Kelvinator Gr8 Women Achievers Award Actor of the Decade.
- 2011: Young Women Achievers Award Excellence in Cinema.
- 2012: PETA India acknowledged Mukerji with a Hero to Animals Award for her compassionate work for animals.
- 2012: T.SUBBARAMI REDDY TV9 FILM AWARD BOLLYWOOD EVER-SHINING STAR FEMALE
- 2013: Mukerji was honored by the US Council on the day of Barack Obama's inauguration into office for Contribution to Indian Cinema.
- 2013: Honored at the 3rd Petrochem GR8! Women Awards in Dubai for Most Successful Actress.
- 2013: Commemorated with Excellence in Acting at GQ India's Men of the Year Awards.
- 2013: Honored at the 19th Kolkata International Film Festival with Panch Kanya Award.
- 2015: Felicitated at a charity dinner hosted by The British Asian Trust in London for her Contribution to the fight against human trafficking.
- 2015: Felicitated by Mumbai University for her Contribution to Indian Cinema.
- 2015: Felicitated by National Institute of Gender Justice for her Contribution towards Gender Sensitization.
- 2017: Recognized and honored by the Prime Minister of Mauritius, Pravind Jugnauth, for her Outstanding Contribution to Cinema.
- 2018: Felicitated at the NBT Utsav Awards for her immense contribution in promotion of Indian language, culture and art through her perseverance, performance and love for the craft.
- 2018: Hoists Indian National Flag at the Indian Film Festival of Melbourne (IFFM).
- 2018: Honored at Lead the Change Pride Awards for her life changing portrayal of an aspiring teacher having Tourette Syndrome in Hichki by WCRC and KVG Media.
- 2018: Honored at the Forbes India Tycoons of Tomorrow with Icon Of Cinema for her exemplary contribution in the field of cinema and entertainment.
- 2019: Honoured with the Most Influential Cinema Personality in South-East Asia at Asian Business Leaders Conclave.
- 2019: Maharashtra Achievers’ Awards for the Most Powerful Performer of the Year for Hichki.
- 2025: Rani Mukerji was honoured with the ‘Excellence in Women Empowerment Through Cinema Award’ by The Bhamla Foundation.
- 2026: Gauravanta Gujrati awards for Outstanding contribution in Indian cinema
- 2026: Vandematram Puraskar for Outstanding contribution in Indian cinema
- 2026: Forbes India Icon of Excellence award For Excellence in Cinema
- 2026: The Hollywood Reporter India's Women in Entertainment 2026 Timeless Icon Award remarkable body of work in Entertainment Industry
- 2026: Raj Kapoor Special Contribution Award at the 62nd Maharashtra State Film Awards for contribution in Indian cinema
- 2026: Honorary Doctor of Letters by La Trobe University Australia for incredible contribution to Indian cinema
- 2026:Honoured at Indian Film Festival of Melbourne for Special citation for excellence in acting
