= 49th Filmfare Awards =

2004 awards for Hindi cinema

- Date: 20 February 2004
- Site: Mumbai
- Hosted by: Shahrukh Khan; Saif Ali Khan; Archana Puran Singh
- Official website: www.filmfare.com

Highlights
- Best Film: Koi... Mil Gaya
- Critics Award for Best Film: Munna Bhai M.B.B.S.
- Most awards: Kal Ho Naa Ho (8)
- Most nominations: Kal Ho Naa Ho (14)

Television coverage
- Network: Sony Entertainment Television (India)

The 49th Filmfare Awards took place on 20 February 2004 in Mumbai.

The ceremony was hosted by Shahrukh Khan, Saif Ali Khan and Archana Puran Singh. This edition of the event was sponsored by Indian conglomerate Manikchand Group.

Kal Ho Naa Ho led the ceremony with 14 nominations, followed by Koi... Mil Gaya with 10 nominations and Munna Bhai M.B.B.S. and Tere Naam with 8 nominations each.

Kal Ho Naa Ho earned 8 awards, including Best Actress (for Preity Zinta), Best Supporting Actor (for Saif Ali Khan) and Best Supporting Actress (for Jaya Bachchan), thus becoming the most-awarded film at the ceremony.

Preity Zinta received dual nominations for Best Actress for her performances in Kal Ho Naa Ho and Koi... Mil Gaya, winning for the former, her first and only win in the category.

== Main awards ==
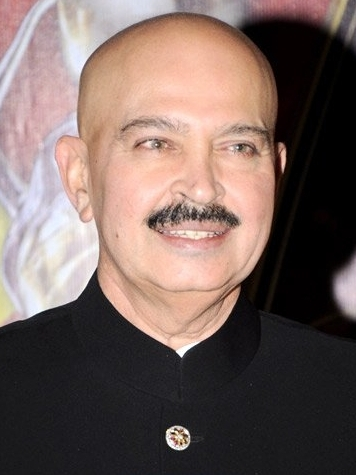
Rakesh Roshan, Best Director winner

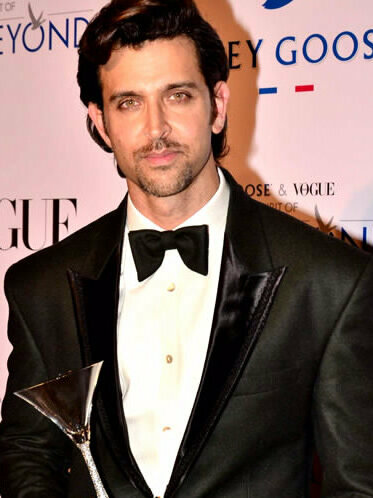
Hrithik Roshan, Best Actor winner

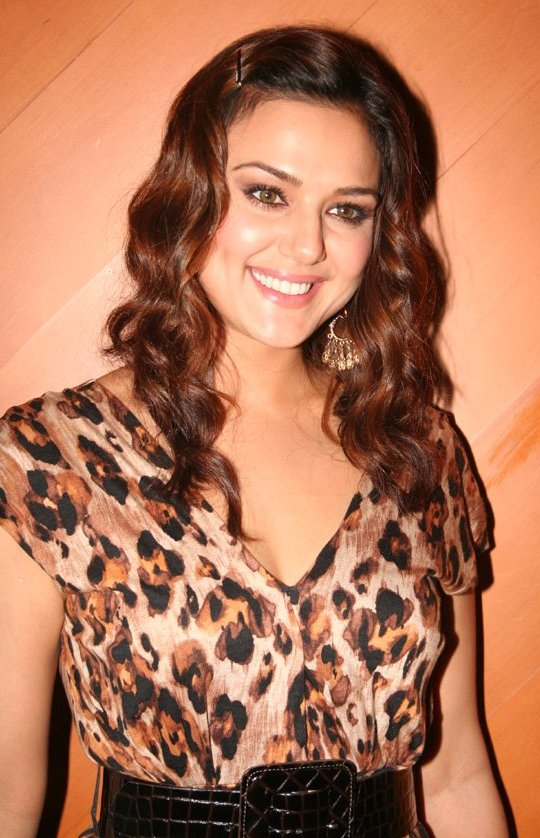
Preity Zinta, Best Actress winner

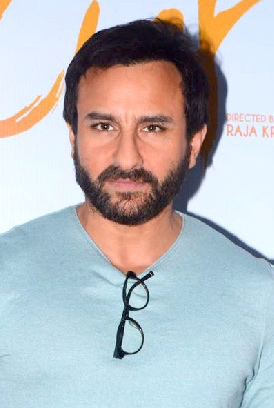
Saif Ali Khan, Best Supporting Actor winner

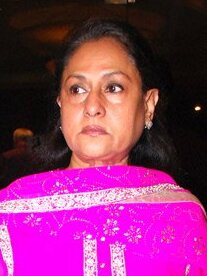
Jaya Bachchan, Best Supporting Actress winner

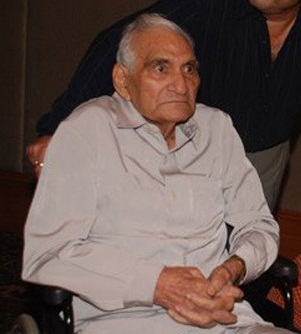
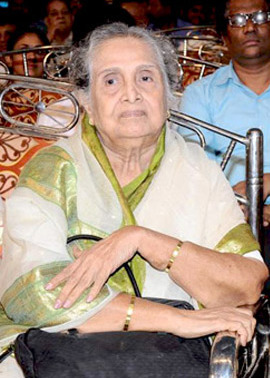
B. R. Chopra, Sulochana Latkar and Nirupa Roy, Lifetime Achievement Awardees

=== Main awards ===
Best Film	Best Director
Koi... Mil Gaya; Baghban; Kal Ho Naa Ho; Munna Bhai M.B.B.S.; Tere Naam; Andaaz	Rakesh Roshan – Koi... Mil Gaya; J. P. Dutta – LOC: Kargil; Nikhil Advani – Kal Ho Naa Ho; Rajkumar Hirani – Munna Bhai M.B.B.S.; Ram Gopal Verma – Bhoot; Satish Kaushik – Tere Naam
Best Actor	Best Actress
Hrithik Roshan – Koi... Mil Gaya as Rohit Mehra; Ajay Devgan – Gangaajal as Amit Kumaar; Amitabh Bachchan – Baghban as Raj Malhotra; Akshay Kumar – Andaaz as Raj Malhotra; Salman Khan – Tere Naam as Radhe Mohan; Shah Rukh Khan – Kal Ho Naa Ho as Aman Mathur	Preity Zinta – Kal Ho Naa Ho as Naina Catherine Kapur; Bhumika Chawla – Tere Naam as Nirjara Bharadwaj; Hema Malini – Baghban as Pooja Malhotra; Preity Zinta – Koi... Mil Gaya as Nisha; Rani Mukherjee – Chalte Chalte as Priya Chopra; Urmila Matondkar – Bhoot as Swati
Best Supporting Actor	Best Supporting Actress
Saif Ali Khan – Kal Ho Naa Ho as Rohit Patel; Abhishek Bachchan – Main Prem Ki Diwani Hoon as Prem Kumar; Arshad Warsi – Munna Bhai M.B.B.S. as Circuit; Manoj Bajpai – LOC: Kargil as Grenadier Yogender Singh Yadav; Salman Khan – Baghban as Alok Raj	Jaya Bachchan – Kal Ho Naa Ho as Jennifer Kapur; Priyanka Chopra – Andaaz as Jia; Rekha – Koi... Mil Gaya as Sonia Mehra; Shabana Azmi – Tehzeeb as Rukhsana Jamal; Shenaz Treasurywala – Ishq Vishk as Alisha Sahay
Best Comic Role	Best Negative Role
Sanjay Dutt – Munna Bhai M.B.B.S. as Murli Prasad Sharma "Munna Bhai"; Boman Irani – Munna Bhai M.B.B.S. as Dr. J. C. Asthana; Johnny Lever – Koi... Mil Gaya as Chellaram Sukhwani; Paresh Rawal – Fun2shh as John D'Souza; Paresh Rawal – Hungama as Radheshyam Tiwari; Rajpal Yadav – Kal Ho Naa Ho as Guru	Irrfan Khan – Haasil as Rannvijay Singh; Bipasha Basu – Jism as Sonia Khanna; Feroz Khan – Janasheen as Saba Karim Shah; Preity Zinta – Armaan as Sonia Kapoor; Yashpal Sharma – Gangaajal as Sunder Yadav
Best Male Debut	Best Female Debut
Shahid Kapoor – Ishq Vishk	Lara Dutta & Priyanka Chopra – Andaaz
Best Music Director	Best Lyricist
Kal Ho Naa Ho – Shankar–Ehsaan–Loy; Chalte Chalte – Jatin–Lalit; Koi... Mil Gaya – Rajesh Roshan; LOC: Kargil – Anu Malik; Tere Naam – Himesh Reshammiya	Kal Ho Naa Ho – Javed Akhtar – Kal Ho Naa Ho; Andaaz – Sameer – Kisi Se Tum Pyaar Karo; Chalte Chalte – Javed Akhtar – Tauba Tumhare Yeh Ishaare; LOC: Kargil – Javed Akhtar – Ek Saathi Aur Bhi Tha; Tere Naam – Sameer – Tere Naam
Best Playback Singer – Male	Best Playback Singer – Female
Kal Ho Naa Ho – Sonu Nigam – Kal Ho Naa Ho; Andaaz – Kumar Sanu – Kisi Se Tum Pyaar Karo; Chalte Chalte – Abhijeet – Suno Na Suno Na; Koi... Mil Gaya – Udit Narayan – Idhar Chala; Tere Naam – Udit Narayan – Tere Naam	Jism – Shreya Ghoshal – Jadoo Hai Nasha Hai; Chalte Chalte – Alka Yagnik – Tauba Tumhare Yeh Ishaare; Ishq Vishk – Alisha Chinai – Chot Dil Pe Lagi; Kal Ho Naa Ho – Alka Yagnik – Kal Ho Naa Ho (Sad Version); Koi... Mil Gaya – K. S. Chithra – Koi Mil Gaya; Tere Naam – Alka Yagnik – Odhni

=== Technical Awards ===
Best Story	Best Screenplay
3 Deewarein – Nagesh Kukunoor	Munna Bhai M.B.B.S. – Vidhu Vinod Chopra, Rajkumar Hirani and Lajan Joseph
Best Dialogue	Scene of the Year
Munna Bhai M.B.B.S. – Abbas Tyrewala	Karan Johar – Kal Ho Naa Ho (The Diary Scene)
Best Action	Best Choreography
Qayamat: City Under Threat – Allan Amin	Koi... Mil Gaya – Farah Khan – "Idhar Chala"
Best Cinematography	Best Art Direction
Pinjar – Muneesh Sappel	Chameli – Aseem Bajaj
Best Background Score	Best Editing
Gangaajal – Wayne Sharpe	Bhoot – Shimit Amin
Best Sound
Bhoot – Dwarak Warrier

==== Special awards ====
Filmfare Special Award
- Kareena Kapoor – Chameli
Lifetime Achievement Award
- Baldev Raj Chopra
- Nirupa Roy
- Sulochana Latkar
RD Burman Award
- Vishal–Shekhar – Jhankaar Beats
Motolook Of The Year
- Saif Ali Khan – Kal Ho Naa Ho
Power Award
- Amitabh Bachchan & Shah Rukh Khan

=== Critics' awards ===
Best Film (Best Director)
Munna Bhai M.B.B.S. – Rajkumar Hirani
Best Actor	Best Actress
Hrithik Roshan – Koi... Mil Gaya as Rohit Mehra	Urmila Matondkar – Bhoot as Swati

== Biggest Winners & Nominees ==
- Kal Ho Naa Ho – 8/14
- Koi... Mil Gaya – 4/10
- Munna Bhai M.B.B.S. – 4/8
- Bhoot – 3/4
- Andaaz – 2/7
- Jism – 1/3
- 3 Deewarein – 1/1
- Chameli – 1/1
- Pinjar – 1/1
- Gangaajal – 1/3
- Ishq Vishk 1/3
- Haasil – 1/1
- Qayamat: City Under Threat – 1/1
- Baghban – 0/4
- LOC: Kargil – 0/4
- Chalte Chalte – 0/5
- Tere Naam – 0/8

== See also ==
- Filmfare Awards
- 50th Filmfare Awards
- List of highest-grossing Bollywood films
