= Rani Mukerji =

Indian actress (born 1978)

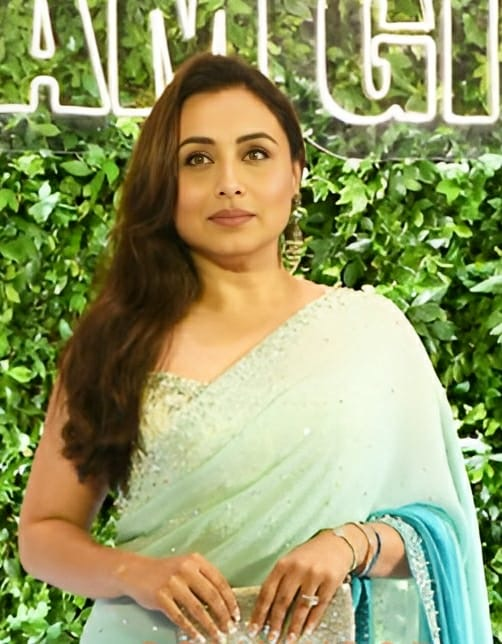
- Mukerji in 2023
- Born: 21 March 1978 (age 48); Bombay, Maharashtra, India
- Education: SNDT Women's University
- Occupation: Actress
- Years active: 1996–present
- Works: Full list
- Spouse: Aditya Chopra (m. 2014)
- Children: 1
- Father: Ram Mukherjee
- Family: Mukherji family; Chopra family
- Awards: Full list

Rani Mukerji (Hindustani pronunciation: [raːni mʊkʰərdʒi]; born 21 March 1978) is an Indian actress who works in Hindi films. One of the highest-paid actresses of the 2000s, She is the recipient of multiple accolades, including a National Film Award and eight Filmfare Awards.

Born into the Mukherjee-Samarth family, Mukerji graduated with a Home Science degree in SNDT Women's University. She began acting as a teenager by starring in her father Ram Mukherjee's Bengali-language film Biyer Phool and in the social drama Raja Ki Aayegi Baaraat (both 1996). Mukerji had her first commercial success with the action film Ghulam and breakthrough with the romance Kuch Kuch Hota Hai (both 1998). Following a brief setback, the year 2002 marked a turning point for her when she was cast by Yash Raj Films as the star of the drama Saathiya.

Mukerji established herself by starring in several commercially successful romantic films, including Chalte Chalte (2003), Hum Tum, Veer-Zaara (both 2004), Bunty Aur Babli (2005), and Kabhi Alvida Naa Kehna (2006). She also gained praise for playing an abused wife in the political drama Yuva (2004) and a deaf and blind woman in the drama Black (2005). Mukerji's collaborations with Yash Raj Films from 2007 and 2010 produced several unsuccessful films and led critics to bemoan her choice of roles. This changed when she played a headstrong journalist in the biographical thriller No One Killed Jessica (2011). Further success came with the thrillers Talaash (2012), Mardaani (2014), Mardaani 2 (2019) and Mardaani 3 (2026), the social message-drama Hichki (2018), which emerged as Mukerji's highest-grossing release, and the drama Mrs. Chatterjee vs Norway (2023), which earned her the National Film Award for Best Actress.

Mukerji is involved with humanitarian causes and is vocal about issues faced by women and children. She has participated in concert tours and stage shows, and featured as a talent judge for the 2009 reality show Dance Premier League. Mukerji is married to filmmaker Aditya Chopra, with whom she has a daughter.

== Early life and background ==
Mukerji was born in Bombay (present-day Mumbai) on 21 March 1978 into the Mukherjee-Samarth family. Her father, Ram Mukherjee, was a former film director and one of the founders of Filmalaya Studios. Her mother, Krishna Mukherjee, was a former playback singer. Her elder brother, Raja Mukherjee, is a film producer and director. Her maternal aunt, Debashree Roy, is a Bengali film actress and her paternal second cousin, Kajol, is a Hindi film actress and her contemporary. Another paternal second cousin, Ayan Mukerji, is a scriptwriter and film director. Despite her parents and many of her relatives being members of the Indian film industry, Mukerji was uninterested in pursuing a career in film. She said, "There were already too many actresses at home and I wanted to be someone different".

Mukerji received her education at Maneckji Cooper High School in Juhu and graduated with a degree in Home Science from SNDT Women's University. She is a trained Odissi dancer and began learning the dance form while in the tenth grade. As part of an annual tradition, the Mukherjee family celebrates the festival of Durga Puja in the suburban neighbourhood of Santacruz every year. Mukerji, a practising Hindu, takes part in the festivities with her entire family.

In 1994, director Salim Khan approached Mukerji to play the lead female role in his directorial, Aa Gale Lag Jaa. Her father disapproved of a full-time career in film at such a young age, so she rejected the offer. At age 18, following her mother's suggestion that she pursue acting on an experimental basis, Mukerji accepted leading roles in the social drama Raja Ki Aayegi Baaraat, Khan's second offer to her, and her father's Bengali film Biyer Phool, both of which were released on 18 October 1996. Before she began work on Raja Ki Aayegi Baaraat, Mukerji trained at Roshan Taneja's acting institute. She portrayed a rape victim who is forced to marry her rapist. Although the film was a commercial failure, Mukerji's performance earned her a special recognition trophy at the annual Screen Awards ceremony. Following the film's poor showing at the box office, Mukerji returned to college to complete her education. However, inspired by her cousin Kajol's success in Hindi films, she decided to pursue a full-time career in films.

== Career ==
=== Breakthrough and initial struggle (1998–2001) ===
In 1998, Mukerji starred opposite Aamir Khan in Vikram Bhatt's action film Ghulam, her first commercial success. Though her role in the film was brief, the song "Aati Kya Khandala" earned her public recognition. Due to Mukerji's husky voice, Bhatt had someone with a higher pitched voice dub her lines; Mukerji stated that it was done as her voice "did not suit the character". In the same year, Karan Johar cast her opposite Shah Rukh Khan and Kajol in his directorial debut Kuch Kuch Hota Hai. The role was originally written for Twinkle Khanna, but when she and several other leading ladies rejected it, Johar signed Mukerji on the insistence of Khan and the filmmaker Aditya Chopra. She played Khan's character's love interest and later wife, Tina who dies after giving birth to their daughter. Johar had originally intended to dub Mukerji's voice, but she improved her diction and eventually provided her own voice. Reviewing the film for India Today, Nandita Chowdhury wrote that it was "the gorgeous Rani who steals the show. Oozing oomph from every pore, she also proves herself an actress whose time has come". Kuch Kuch Hota Hai proved a breakthrough for Mukerji; it had earnings of over ₹1.03 billion (US$11 million) to emerge as the year's top-grossing Hindi film, and won eight Filmfare Awards, including Best Supporting Actress for Mukerji. Following this, she had starring roles in Mehndi (1998) and Hello Brother (1999), critical and commercial disappointments that failed to propel her career forward.

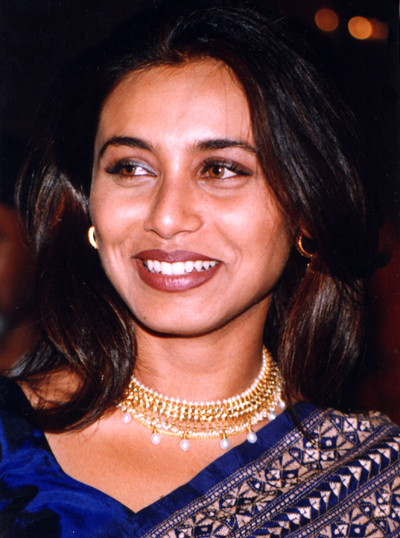
Mukerji at the audio release of Chori Chori Chupke Chupke in 2001

By 2000, Mukerji wanted to avoid typecasting as a "standard Hindi film heroine" and thus decided to portray more challenging roles in addition to the archetypical glamorous lead. In Badal and Bichhoo, two male-centric action dramas (both starring Bobby Deol), she played roles that were met with little acclaim from critics. A supporting role in Kamal Haasan's bilingual film Hey Ram proved more rewarding. The film was a partly fictionalised account of Mahatma Gandhi's assassination and Mukerji played a Bengali school teacher who is raped and murdered during communal riots in Calcutta. Having only portrayed glamorous roles thus far, she was challenged by Haasan's insistence on realism and to appear on screen without wearing make-up; she believed that the experience changed her approach to acting. The controversial subject matter of Hey Ram led to poor box office earnings, but the film was critically acclaimed and selected as India's official entry to the Oscars. A critic of Deccan Herald took note of her performance. After starring in the romantic comedies Hadh Kar Di Aapne and Kahin Pyaar Na Ho Jaaye, Mukerji starred alongside Salman Khan and Preity Zinta in the romantic comedy Har Dil Jo Pyar Karega, which earned her second nomination for the Filmfare Award for Best Supporting Actress nomination. Padmaraj Nair of Screen found her role to be "too meagre for her to prove herself" but added that "she is quite adequate in whatever scenes she has been given". It was a moderate box-office success.

Mukerji's first film of 2001, Chori Chori Chupke Chupke, was released after controversy over the film's funding by the Mumbai underworld delayed it by a few months. The film, based on surrogacy, marked her second collaboration with Salman Khan and Zinta. Film critic Sukanya Verma found Mukerji to be "handicapped with a role that doesn't give her much scope" and preferred the "meatier" role of Zinta. The film played well at the box office. In Bas Itna Sa Khwaab Hai and Nayak: The Real Hero, films that failed to gain a wide audience theatrically, Mukerji played the love interests of Abhishek Bachchan and Anil Kapoor respectively. In a review for the latter film, Sarita Tanwar of Rediff.com bemoaned that she had "very little to do except being part of some magnificently picturised songs". She had an extended cameo in her final release that year, Kabhi Khushi Kabhie Gham. An article in Mint summarised that a majority of her roles post Kuch Kuch Hota Hai were "inconsequential".

=== Established actress (2002–2006) ===
Mukerji began collaborating with Yash Raj Films in 2002, when the company cast her in two productions: Mujhse Dosti Karoge!, a romantic comedy co-starring Hrithik Roshan and Kareena Kapoor, and Saathiya, a remake of the Tamil romance Alaipayuthey. The former performed poorly at the box office, as did her two collaborations with Govinda that year—Pyaar Diwana Hota Hai and Chalo Ishq Ladaaye. The romantic drama Saathiya, however, proved a turning point in her career. At the 48th Filmfare Awards, she received her first Best Actress nomination and was awarded the Critics Award for Best Actress (shared with Manisha Koirala in Company). Shaad Ali cast her in the role of Suhani Sharma, a medical student who deals with the troubles of being married at a young age, for the vulnerability that he found in her. She refused the offer at first as she disliked the idea of remaking an accomplished film but was convinced to accept the part by the film's producer Aditya Chopra. In it, she played opposite Vivek Oberoi, with whom she did not enjoy working, saying that his "attitude was bothersome". Saathiya emerged as a commercial success. The BBC wrote that "Mukerji plays the character of a middle-class girl with great conviction", and Udita Jhunjhunwala of Mid-Day added that "her expressions and acting are understated in a role that fits her like a glove".

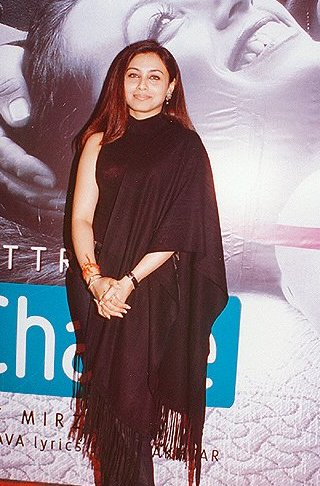
Mukerji at the audio launch of Chalte Chalte in 2003

The year 2003 marked the beginning of the most successful period in Mukerji's career. She replaced Aishwarya Rai to play the lead opposite Shah Rukh Khan in Aziz Mirza's romance Chalte Chalte. Media reports suggested that Rai was replaced after feuding with her then boyfriend Salman Khan on the film's sets, but Shah Rukh Khan insisted that Mukerji had been the original choice for the role. Mukerji believed that the theme of Chalte Chalte, which dealt with misunderstandings between a married couple, was similar to that of Saathiya, and she tried to lend variety to the role by putting "them against a different background". She has said that working with Shah Rukh Khan was a learning experience for her, and he would often scold her if she performed inadequately. A commercial success, Box Office India credited it as a career comeback for Mukerji, and she received her second nomination for the Filmfare Award for Best Actress. None of her other releases of the year—Chori Chori, Calcutta Mail, and LOC: Kargil—made a mark.

At the 50th Filmfare Awards, Mukerji won both the Best Actress and Best Supporting Actress awards, becoming the only actress to win both awards in the same year. The Best Supporting Actress win was for Mani Ratnam's Yuva (2004), a composite film with an ensemble cast, about three youngsters from different strata of society whose lives intersect by a car accident; Mukerji was cast as Shashi Biswas, a poor Bengali housewife who is abused by her husband, a local goon (Abhishek Bachchan). She based her role on her house helps who were abused by their husbands and observed their body language and speaking style. Taran Adarsh wrote, "Amongst the leading ladies, it is Rani Mukerji who is the best of the lot. The role demanded an actress of substance and Rani more than lives up to the expectations." She won the Best Actress award for her starring role as Rhea Prakash in Kunal Kohli's Hum Tum (2004), a romantic comedy about two headstrong individuals who meet at different stages of their lives. The film pitted her opposite Saif Ali Khan and proved one of the biggest commercial successes of the year. The Hindu found Mukerji's portrayal of Rhea to be "self-assuredly competent" and Tanmaya Kumar Nanda of Rediff.com wrote, "Rani is her usual collected self, changing into the many hues of her character with the ease of a chameleon".

This success continued when Yash Chopra cast her in his period romantic drama Veer-Zaara (2004). Set against the background of India–Pakistan relations, it is about the titular star-crossed lovers (Shah Rukh Khan and Preity Zinta). In a part originally written for a man, Mukerji played a Pakistani lawyer who tries to help the couple. With a worldwide gross of ₹940 million (US$10 million), Veer-Zaara emerged as the highest-grossing Hindi film of the year, and it was later screened at the Berlin International Film Festival. Derek Elley of Variety took note of the "quietly dignified perf from Mukerji", and the BBC opined that she "deserves praise for her acting. To act through your eyes and not using dialogue is an art. Rani for one, has perfected this." She won the IIFA Award for Best Supporting Actress, and received her fourth nomination in the same category at Filmfare.

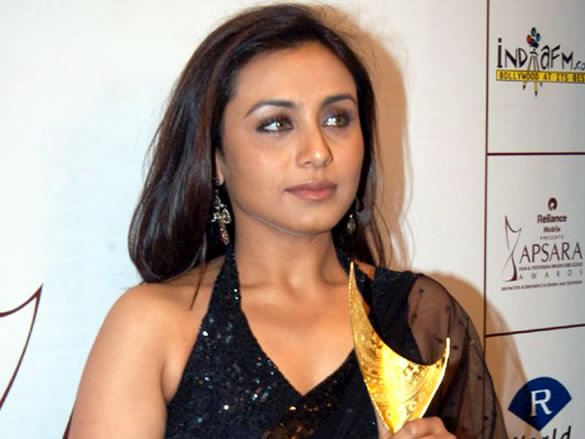
Mukerji at the Apsara Awards ceremony, where she was awarded Best Actress for her performance in Black (2005)

In 2005, Outlook magazine published that Mukerji had established herself as the most successful actress of contemporary Hindi cinema. Her first film role that year was opposite Amitabh Bachchan in Sanjay Leela Bhansali's Black, a drama about an alcoholic man who dedicates his life to teach a blind and deaf girl how to communicate. Bhansali wrote the part of the blind-deaf girl specifically for Mukerji, who was initially hesitant to take on the role due to its "challenging" subject matter. Once Bhansali enforced his faith in her, she agreed and began studying sign language with professionals at the Helen Keller Institute in Mumbai. Black won several awards including two National Film Awards and 11 Filmfare Awards, and Richard Corliss of Time featured it as the fifth best film of the year. Empire magazine called Mukerji's performance "astonishing", and Filmfare included her work in their listing of Indian cinema's "80 Most Iconic performances" and wrote, "Rani has left an indelible mark with this role that usually comes once in a lifetime for most". She became the only actress to win both the Best Actress and Best Actress – Critics trophies at the Filmfare Awards ceremony.

Mukerji received a second Best Actress nomination that year at Filmfare, and her fifth overall, for her work opposite Abhishek Bachchan in Bunty Aur Babli, which marked her fifth collaboration with Yash Raj Films. She played the title character of Babli, a con woman. The film was the second highest-grossing Hindi film of 2005. Namrata Joshi of Outlook wrote that she "plays to the gallery with ease". Mukerji followed it with Amol Palekar's fantasy film Paheli, reuniting her with Shah Rukh Khan. The film was a box office flop in India but was given a strong international release; it was screened at the Sundance Film Festival and was India's submission for the Best Foreign Language Film at the 79th Academy Awards. Raja Sen of Rediff.com was impressed by the film as well as Mukerji's performance which he called "another perfectly played part". Mukerji's final release of the year was the period film Mangal Pandey: The Rising, about the titular soldier. Director Ketan Mehta initially approached her for a cameo appearance, which was developed into a larger part during filming. Her role was that of Heera, a prostitute who becomes the love interest of Pandey (Aamir Khan). Derek Elley mentioned that despite a small role, Mukerji made "the most of her feisty nautch-girl".

Mukerji turned down an offer from Mira Nair to star in the English film The Namesake, choosing instead to reteam with Karan Johar in Kabhi Alvida Naa Kehna (2006), a drama about infidelity. Collaborating once again with Shah Rukh Khan, Abhishek Bachchan and Zinta, she played an unhappily married woman who has an affair with a married man. Commenting on the divisive nature of her role, Mukerji said that it changed her own perception of love and marriage. Kabhi Alvida Naa Kehna was a popular release, earning over ₹1.13 billion (US$12 million) to emerge as the highest-grossing Hindi film in overseas to that point. Rajeev Masand wrote that the "consistently competent Rani Mukherjee takes on the film's toughest role — a part that may be hard to sympathise with — but she injects it with tenderness and believability", but Kaveree Bamzai of India Today dismissed it as another one of her roles requiring the "art of weeping copiously and smiling valiantly". It won Mukerji a third consecutive IIFA Award for Best Actress and a sixth Best Actress nomination at Filmfare. The poorly received melodrama Baabul was her final film appearance of that year.

=== Professional setback (2007–2009) ===
Following the failure of Baabul, Yash Raj Films cast Mukerji in Siddharth Anand's family drama Ta Ra Rum Pum in the role of a racing driver's (Saif Ali Khan) wife and the mother of two. She was excited to play the part of a mother for the first time, and modelled her character after her own mother. Released in 2007, the film was a financial success, but received mixed reactions from critics. Khalid Mohamed hailed Mukerji's performance as "near flawless" but Rajeev Masand thought that neither she nor Khan "are able to make much of an impression because their characters are so unidimensional and boring." The drama Laaga Chunari Mein Daag from director Pradeep Sarkar starred Mukerji as a young woman who is forced to moonlight as a prostitute to fend for her family. Her portrayal earned her a seventh Best Actress nomination at Filmfare, but the film had poor critical and financial returns. Shubhra Gupta of The Indian Express noted that Mukerji was responsible for "hold[ing] the film together, even if her part, both as the ingénue and the hooker, doesn't have freshness".

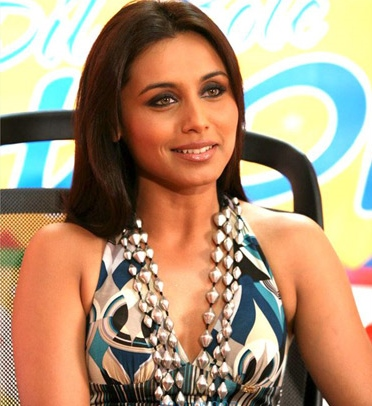
Mukerji at a promotional event for Dil Bole Hadippa! in 2009

Mukerji once again played a prostitute in Bhansali's Saawariya, an adaptation of Fyodor Dostoevsky's White Nights, co-starring Ranbir Kapoor and Sonam Kapoor. She insisted that the consecutive prostitutes she played were different from each other, with the one in Saawariya having "no problem with her profession". Her only release in three years not produced by Yash Raj Films, it was the first Indian film produced by a Hollywood studio, Sony Pictures. The film was a box office flop and met with poor reactions from critics. Mukerji's performance, which was described by A. O. Scott of The New York Times as "divine", earned her a second Filmfare nomination that year, this time for Best Supporting Actress, her fifth in the category. By the end of 2007, Mukerji's popularity had begun to wane. Rediff.com attributed this to her "monotonous pairing" with the same set of actors; Hindustan Times published that she had become an "exclusive Yash Raj heroine" which hindered other filmmakers from approaching her.

After a series of dramatic parts, Mukerji sought to play a light-hearted part, which she found in Kunal Kohli's Thoda Pyaar Thoda Magic (2008), a children's film about an angel who comes to Earth to help four troubled kids. In a scathing review, Khalid Mohamed criticised Mukerji's choice of roles and wrote that "she's one-dimensional, either darting full blast smiles or tetchy scowls. Her costumes, too, are uneasy-on-the-eyes". The film had low box office returns and further contributed to a decline in Mukerji's career prospects. An India Today article spoke of her "running out of luck at the box office" and mentioned her decline in endorsements.

In an attempt to overcome this decline, Mukerji lost weight and underwent a makeover. She continued to collaborate with Yash Raj Films, taking on a starring role opposite Shahid Kapoor in the romantic comedy Dil Bole Hadippa! (2009). Mukerji had high expectations from the film in which she played a cricket-obsessed Punjabi village girl masquerading as a man, and it had its world premiere at the Toronto International Film Festival. The Economic Times critic Gaurav Malani was disappointed with the picture and wrote that Mukerji "comes up with a spirited performance but her mock sob-whine-whimper do not amuse anymore. Also after a point you dislike visualizing the charming actress as the moustached male player". The film was Mukerji's fourth financial failure in a row. When questioned about her recent spate of flops with the Yash Raj Films banner, she defended the collaborations, saying that "I stand by those films regardless of their fate". Later that year, she featured as a talent judge for the Sony Entertainment Television reality show Dance Premier League. She agreed to appear on television to gain visibility during a low phase in her film career.

=== Success in thrillers and Hichki (2010–2019) ===
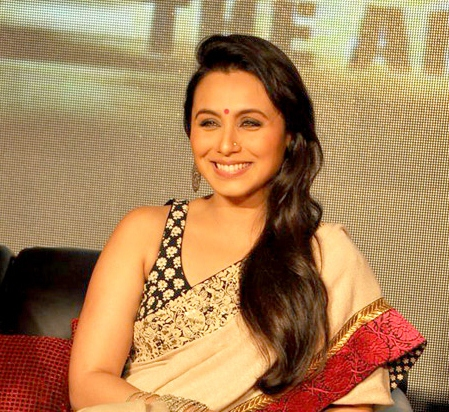
Mukerji at the audio release of Talaash: The Answer Lies Within in 2012

Aniruddha Guha of Daily News and Analysis described Mukerji's performance in the 2011 film No One Killed Jessica as "one of her best performances till date". Co-starring Vidya Balan, the film was Mukerji's first commercial success since Ta Ra Rum Pum, and was especially noted for being so in the absence of a male star. Based on the Jessica Lal murder case, it featured Mukerji as a fictionalised foul-mouthed journalist who is deeply involved with the case. She has described how different the role was from the ones she had previously played, saying, "I actually had to play a man!" Certain critics, however, were critical of her performance, including Anupama Chopra, who called her role "the fatal, false note", arguing that "the character is written superficially and Rani's portrayal of her is equally banal. It's all about externals. She argues a lot and proudly labels herself a bitch, but her hair stays perfectly in place and in the end, she even gets to do a super-hero-like slow motion walk." Even so, the role earned her a third Best Supporting Actress trophy at Filmfare.

Mukerji next accepted a leading role in the comedy of manners Aiyyaa (2012). Under the direction of Sachin Kundalkar, she played a woman with a heightened sense of smell who develops a one-sided attraction towards Prithviraj Sukumaran's character. Critically and commercially unsuccessful, Rediff.com criticised her decision to star in the film, writing that she "gets no support from the way her character is written". Greater success came for her portrayal of Roshni Shekhawat, a mother grieving the death of her child, in Reema Kagti's psychological thriller Talaash: The Answer Lies Within. Co-starring Aamir Khan and Kareena Kapoor, the film had worldwide earnings of over ₹1.74 billion (US$19 million) to emerge as the year's eighth highest-grossing Hindi film. Ronnie Schieb of Variety described Mukerji as "vivid in a quietly sympathetic role", and she received her seventh nomination for the Filmfare Award for Best Supporting Actress.

In 2013, Mukerji starred in the anthology film Bombay Talkies consisting of four short films. She was part of the segment helmed by Johar, in which she played a journalist who discovers that her husband (Randeep Hooda) is gay. The film was screened at the 2013 Cannes Film Festival. Despite poor box office returns, Bombay Talkies met with critical acclaim, particularly for Johar's segment; Tushar Joshi of Daily News and Analysis praised the subtlety in Mukerji's performance. The following year, Mukerji starred in Pradeep Sarkar's crime thriller Mardaani, in which she played the lead role of Shivani Shivaji Roy, a Marathi policewoman involved in a kidnapping case that leads her to uncover secrets of human trafficking. She took on the role to show girls "how they need to protect themselves". In preparation, she interacted with senior officials of Mumbai Police, and learned the Israeli self-defence technique of Krav Maga. Rajeev Masand credited Mukerji for "investing Shivani with both physical strength and emotional courage, she gives us a hero that's hard not to root for", and Anupama Chopra commended her for providing her character with both "steely resolve" and "emotional depth". The film was a commercial success and garnered Mukerji her eighth nomination for the Filmfare Award for Best Actress.

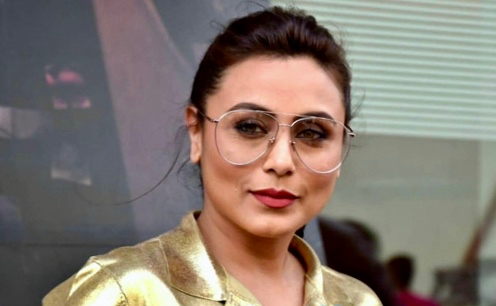
Mukerji promoting Mardaani 2 in 2019

Following the birth of her child, Mukerji took a four-year hiatus to focus on her daughter and was persuaded by her husband, Aditya Chopra, to return to acting. She was keen to work on a project that would accommodate her parental commitments and found it in the comedy-drama Hichki (2018). Inspired by Brad Cohen's autobiography Front of the Class, the film tells the story of Naina Mathur, an aspiring teacher suffering from Tourette syndrome who must prove herself by educating underprivileged children. Mukerji interacted with Cohen and she trained to make her character's motor and vocal tics appear spontaneous and not rehearsed. In a mixed review, Anna M. M. Vetticad of Firstpost wrote that she "lifts Hichki every time she is on the scene, bringing empathy and charm to Naina's character without at any moment soliciting the audience's pity." It earned ₹2.33 billion (US$25 million) worldwide, a majority of which came from the Chinese box office, and its success led Mukerji to express an interest in working more frequently in the future. She received her ninth nomination for the Filmfare Award for Best Actress.

Mukerji reprised her role as Shivani Shivaji Roy in Mardaani 2 (2019), directed by Gopi Puthran, who wrote the first film. In it, Roy faces off against a young rapist (Vishal Jethwa). The Indian Express wrote that Mukerji is "in command right through as she works to a script which pushes her to the fore at every given chance", but Rahul Desai of Film Companion criticised her for overplaying Roy "as more of a Dhoom franchise character" than a cop. Mardaani 2 performed well at the box office and received her tenth nomination for the Filmfare Award for Best Actress.

=== Intermittent work (2020–present) ===
In 2021, Mukerji reprised her role in Bunty Aur Babli 2, a spiritual successor to her 2005 film Bunty Aur Babli 2 where she co-starred opposite Saif Ali Khan. The film received negative reviews from critics, and was a commercial failure, though Mukerji's performance and comic-timing received praise. She next appeared in the legal drama Mrs. Chatterjee vs Norway, based on the real-life story of a Bengali immigrant couple whose children were taken away by the Norwegian Child Welfare Services. It marked her first project in a decade not to be produced by Yash Raj Films. She based her character's diction and mannerisms on her own mother. The film was mostly received poorly by critics, who found Mukerji overly melodramatic, although some reviewers noted her growing impetus in latter portions. Reviewing the film for Screen Daily, Namrata Joshi dismissed its melodramatic tone, adding that "most disappointing is an otherwise reliable Mukherji being far from effective in her shrill and showy turn". Still, the film emerged as a sleeper hit and earned Mukerji multiple accolades, including her third Filmfare Critics Award for Best Actress (shared with Shefali Shah for Three of Us), her fourth IIFA Award for Best Actress, her first National Film Award for Best Actress in a Leading Role, in addition to her eleventh nomination for the Filmfare Award for Best Actress.

Mukerji reprised her role as Shivani Shivaji Roy in the crime-thriller Mardaani 3. It received a more lukewarm reception from critics compared to its predecessors, but outgrossed both of them to become the highest-grossing film of the franchise. Dhaval Roy of The Times of India concluded that "Mardaani 3 isn't without flaws, but it still holds as a solid franchise outing anchored by Rani Mukerji's performance". Saibal Chatterjee found it to be among the finest of her 30-year acting career. She will next reunite with Shah Rukh Khan for the action-thriller King directed by Siddharth Anand.

== Personal life ==
Mukerji prefers not to publicise her personal life. She limits her interactions with the media and is sometimes labelled a recluse; she said in a 2011 interview: "Today actors have become more open with the media. But this has posed a problem for actors like me because if I don't do that, then I end up being called reclusive. So now I have changed myself and am easily approachable." Mukerji has collaborated frequently and maintained a close friendship with actors Shah Rukh Khan and Aamir Khan, and filmmaker Karan Johar. She does not have any social media accounts, as she prefers to keep a low profile.

The nature of Mukerji's relationship with filmmaker Aditya Chopra was the topic of fervent tabloid reporting in India, though she refused to publicly talk about it. On 21 April 2014, she married Chopra at a private Bengali ceremony in Italy. The following year, she gave birth to their daughter Adira. She has said that "the time spent being a mother is the happiest period of my life". Mukerji has said that she believes in maintaining a work-life balance after motherhood, adding that "it is extremely important for [a mother] to have a career and use her time constructively". In 2023, she revealed that she had a miscarriage in 2020, five months into her second pregnancy. A practising Hindu, Mukerji participates in Hindu festivals, including Durga Puja.

== Off-screen work ==
=== Stage shows and other appearances ===
Mukerji has participated in several concert tours, world tours and televised award ceremonies. Her first concert tour, "Magnificent Five", was in 1999 in which she performed with actors Aamir Khan, Aishwarya Rai, Akshaye Khanna and Twinkle Khanna. The "Temptations 2004" concert had Mukerji perform alongside Shah Rukh Khan, Saif Ali Khan, Preity Zinta, Arjun Rampal and Priyanka Chopra. Shown in over 22 countries across the world, it was Bollywood's most prominent international concert. The following year, she participated in the "Temptations 2005" concert in New Delhi with Shah Rukh Khan, Fardeen Khan, Ameesha Patel and Malaika Arora Khan; the show was organised to help raise funds for the National Centre For Promotion of Employment for Disabled People (NCPEDP).

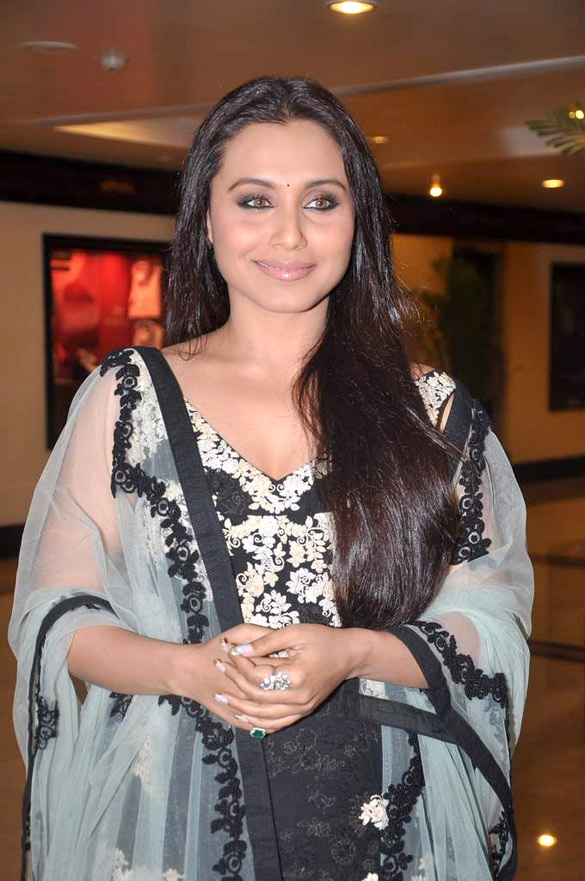
Mukerji at an event in 2015

In 2010, Mukerji performed at a concert in the Army Stadium of Dhaka, Bangladesh with several Bollywood actors including Shah Rukh Khan, Rampal and Ishaa Koppikar. For the "Temptations Reloaded" concert of 2012 in Jakarta, Mukerji performed alongside Shah Rukh Khan, Zinta and Bipasha Basu, for the 2013 concert of the same name in Auckland, she performed with Shah Rukh Khan, Madhuri Dixit and Jacqueline Fernandez, and in 2014 she performed in Malaysia with Shah Rukh Khan, Dixit, Yo Yo Honey Singh and Arijit Singh.

Mukerji has taken part in documentaries including Bollywood im Alpenrausch, Gambling, Gods and LSD, The Outer World of Shah Rukh Khan and The Romantics. Mukerji also appeared in the music video "Tera Chehra" with Adnan Sami.

=== Humanitarian work ===
Alongside her acting career, Mukerji is involved with humanitarian causes and is vocal about issues faced by women and children. Mukerji was appointed as an ambassador by Procter & Gamble and the non-governmental organization (NGO) Child Rights and You for their joint venture, Shiksha, to endorse the cause of children's education. In 2011 she set up a Stroke Treatment Fund, in association with the Indian Stroke Association, to pay for the treatment of financially deprived stroke-affected patients. She has made public appearances to support other charities and causes. In March 2004, she visited the Indian army unit in Pokhran, Rajasthan, to interact with the jawan troops for the NDTV reality show Jai Jawan. A decade later, in August 2014, she visited the jawans again at Baramulla. In February 2005, Mukerji and several other Bollywood actors participated in the 2005 HELP! Telethon Concert to raise money for the victims of the 2004 Indian Ocean earthquake.

In March 2006, Mukerji celebrated her birthday with the physically challenged children of the Helen Keller Institute; she had previously worked with them while preparing for her role in Black. In November 2010, she was part of a fund raising auction for the "Because I am a Girl" charity campaign. In 2014, Mukerji attended a charity dinner on child trafficking hosted by the British Asian Trust in London, where she was felicitated by Prince Charles for raising awareness on the issue through her work in Mardaani. Mukerji also attended "Junoon" charity cricket match, hosted by the Rotaract Club of HR College Mumbai in 2012.

Mukerji appeared as celebrity guest on Kaun Banega Crorepati's Hindi and Bengali version, after which she donated the received prize money for social causes. She donated Hindi versions prize money to the Bandra Holy Family Hospital, for their NICU centre and donated Bengali versions money for other charity works. In 2012, PETA India acknowledged Mukerji with a Hero to Animals Award for her compassionate work for animals. She lends her support to cancer initiatives and created awareness alongside the NGO, Cancer Patients Aid Association (CPAA). In 2023, Femina honoured her for her association with Amitabh Bachchan Foundation, the Indian Cancer Society, the Teach For India programme and the Swachh Bharat Abhiyan (where she worked as a Swachh Bharat Ambassador).

== Artistry and screen persona ==
Mukerji is cited in the media as one of the most popular and accomplished actresses in mainstream Hindi cinema. As part of a career analysis, Sukanya Verma noted that after making an unconventional debut in films, Mukerji oscillated between success and failure for a few years before achieving "the status of a star, performer and showgirl". Indo-Asian News Service reported that during her initial years in the industry, Mukerji was written off as the successful Kajol's poor cousin for being "plump" and "short". Raja Sen opined that despite that, Mukerji "slogged her way with grit" to emerge a successful star.

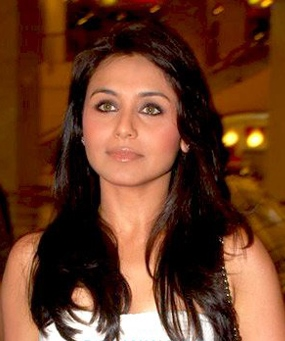
Mukerji in 2009

Writing about her acting skills, Forbes India noted that she "went on to master her skills to such an extent that she could easily absorb the nuances of the characters she played and effortlessly become that person on screen." Mukerji's directors Pradeep Sarkar and Reema Kagti have taken note of how much Mukerji prepares for her roles, with Kagti adding, "She gets obsessive about the role and wants to know everything about her character. What's her character's back-story, what is going on in her head at a specific point". Mukerji described her approach to acting in 2012:

A month before I start shooting, I sit with my director, try to understand how he has visualised the character on the screen and take notes. Then I start working on the most basic thing – the look. It's very important that the physical appearance of the character gets decided because if I look the character, it makes it all the more believable. Once that is achieved, I go into the finer nuances of what the girl is like, her background. And then from there [...] I have to get the accent right.

Mukerji avoids being typecast, and has been credited in the media for her versatility. Manjula Negi of Hindustan Times said that she balances between high-profile blockbusters and small-scale films. Namrata Joshi of Outlook adds that she is unafraid to take risks and portray roles that "none of her contemporaries have been able to do".

The media cites her as an "unconventional beauty" – her husky voice, eyes and smile being her distinctive features. Baradwaj Rangan believes that Mukerji's "sandpaper-scratchy, I'm-recovering-from-a-bad-cold" voice sets her apart from her contemporaries. and Filmfare described her screen presence as "earthy, effervescent and emotional".

Mukerji is noted for maintaining her career post-marriage and motherhood. When Mukerji made her screen comeback with Hichki, Nayandeep Rakshit complimented her for managing to stay relevant. The commercial success of Hichki and Mardaani 2, both released after her marriage, led Filmfare to credit Mukerji for breaking "the stereotype that actresses have battled for generations that post marriage and kids, an actress' career gets over in Bollywood".

== In the media ==
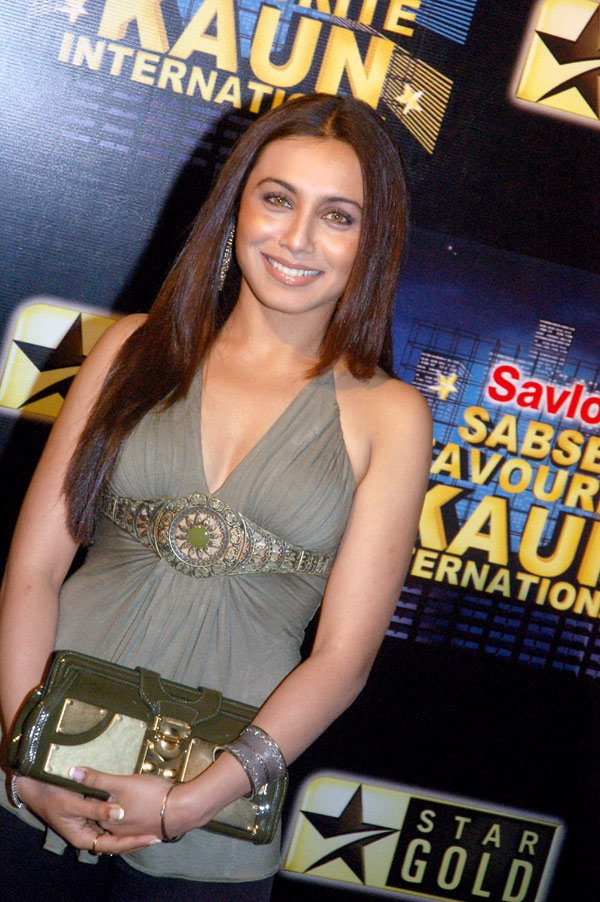
Mukerji's husky voice, accentuated eyes and smile have been identified by the media as her trademark

Mukerji has featured in listings of the highest-paid actresses in Bollywood. Mukerji appeared in Box Office India's "Top Bollywood Actresses" list for six years and topped the list for two consecutive years (2005–2006). In its "All Time Top Actress" list, she was placed third and was further placed second in its top actresses list from 2000–2009. In Rediff.com's annual listing of "Best Bollywood Actresses", she topped the list for three consecutive years (2004–2006). She was further placed second in 2003, fifth in 2007, tenth in 2012, seventh in 2014, tenth in 2018, and fifth in 2023. Mukerji was also placed in Rediff.com's other listing — "Powerlist: Top Bollywood Actresses", "Bollywood's Best Actresses of all time", "Bollywood's Wonder Women", "Women of Many Faces"., and "Best Dressed Woman" in Hindi cinema. Mukerji featured among the "Greatest Bollywood Stars" in a UK poll celebrating 100 years of Indian cinema in 2013. Filmfare featured her in their "Ten Most Powerful People in Bollywood" list for two consecutive years (2005–2006). She was later placed in their "Top Ten Actresses" list from 2003 to 2006. Outlook India placed Mukerji in its 75 Best Bollywood Actresses list. India Today placed her in a similar list of top Bollywood actresses.

Mukerji has been featured in some lists of the most beautiful actresses. Femina listed her in their "50 Most Beautiful Women" list in 2007 and 2008. The UK magazine Eastern Eye placed her in their "Asia's Sexiest Women" list between 2006 and 2012. In Times of India's "Most Desirable Women" list, she was placed 46th in 2009. In 2011, American hip hop duo Blue Scholars named a song after Mukerji in their album Cinemetropolis. In 2014, Mukerji was honoured by the US Council on the day of Barack Obama's inauguration into office for Contribution to Indian Cinema. In 2017, she was honoured with the Outstanding Contribution to Cinema Award by the Government of Mauritius, and in 2018, was received an award for Excellence in Cinema at the Indian Film Festival of Melbourne. Mukerji was among the ten recipients of IIFA-FICCI Frames' award for Most Powerful Entertainers of the Decade. Mukerji has been a celebrity endorser for a number of brands and products such as Dabur Amla, Titan Raga, Nestlé Munch, Fanta and Good Knight. Since 2007, Mukerji's popularity was on a decline and she lost out on her brand endorsements to a number of younger actresses.

== Accolades ==
Mukerji has won eight Filmfare Awards. For her roles in the films Kuch Kuch Hota Hai (1998), Yuva (2004) and No One Killed Jessica (2011), she won the Filmfare Award for Best Supporting Actress. She won the Filmfare Award for Best Actress for Hum Tum (2004) and Black (2005), and the Filmfare Critics Award for Best Actress for Saathiya (2002), Black (2005), and Mrs. Chatterjee vs Norway (2023). Mukerji also won the National Film Award for Best Actress in a Leading Role for Mrs. Chatterjee vs Norway (2023). Mukerji won Raj Kapoor Special Contribution Award in 2026.

== See also ==
- List of Indian film actresses
- List of Bengali actresses
- List of Bollywood Clans: The Mukherjees

== Bibliography ==
- Banaji, S. (2006). Reading 'Bollywood': The Young Audience and Hindi Films. Palgrave Macmillan. ISBN 978-0-230-50120-1.
- Cunningham, Stuart; Sinclair, John (2001). Floating Lives: The Media and Asian Diasporas. Rowman & Littlefield. ISBN 978-0-7425-1136-1.
- Dawar, Ramesh (2006). Bollywood Yesterday-Today-Tomorrow. Star Publications. ISBN 978-1-905863-01-3.
- Ganti, Tejaswini (16 February 2012). Producing Bollywood: Inside the Contemporary Hindi Film Industry. Duke University Press. ISBN 978-0-8223-5213-6.
- Joshi, Rishikesh (3 April 2017). "Mardaani - Rani all the way....". First Day, Last Show: Impressions of a Film Lover. Notion Press. ISBN 9781946822741.
- Chatterji, Shoma A (2020). Bollywood Cinema Kaleidoscope. Doshor Publication. ISBN 9-788-1944-4291-2.
