= Manikchand Group =

Industry group

Manikchand Group is a group of industries in India that primarily started out as a company that produced chewable tobacco products called gutka. The company sponsored the Filmfare Awards for many years.

== Profile ==
This group was founded by Mr Rasiklal Manikchand Dhariwal from a small town Shirur-Ghodnadi and named after his father 'Manikchand'. It is headquartered in Pune, the Manikchand Group is a privately owned group of industries in India. It primarily started out as a company that produced chewable tobacco products called gutka in the 1960s. The group is diversified into Pan Masala, Mouth Freshner, Packaged Water (Oxyrich), Offset Printing, Wedding Cards (JRD Print pack), Flexible laminated Packaging (DIL), Electrical Switches (Xen), Flour Mills (MRFM), Construction, Water Bottle Preforms. Some of the industry products act as a front for surrogate advertising through the audio-video media channels due to strict restrictions or bans on tobacco advertising in India. Its products are exported to more than 30 countries.

The company is presently co-owned by Prakash Rasiklal Dhariwal and Janhavi Dhariwal Balan. However, the business is unofficially split as Janhavi Dhariwal Balan being the CMD of Manikchand Oxyrich and JRD Printpack while Prakash Dhariwal owning RMD (Pan Masala, Gutkha and Mouth Freshener), MR Flour Mills and Construction in the name of Dhariwal Constructions Pvt. Ltd.
