= Mrs. Chatterjee vs Norway =

- Theatrical release poster
- Directed by: Ashima Chibber
- Written by: Sameer Satija; Ashima Chibber; Rahul Handa
- Produced by: Nikhil Advani; Monisha Advani; Madhu Bhojwani
- Starring: Rani Mukerji; Anirban Bhattacharya; Jim Sarbh; Neena Gupta
- Cinematography: Alvar Kõue
- Edited by: Namrata Rao
- Music by: Songs: Amit Trivedi; Score: Hitesh Sonik
- Production companies: Emmay Entertainment; Zee Studios
- Distributed by: Zee Studios
- Release date: 17 March 2023
- Running time: 144 minutes
- Country: India
- Language: Hindi
- Budget: ₹29 crore
- Box office: ₹36.53 crore

Mrs. Chatterjee vs Norway is a 2023 Indian Hindi-language legal drama film written and directed by Ashima Chibber. The film stars Rani Mukerji, Anirban Bhattacharya (in his Hindi film debut), Neena Gupta, and Jim Sarbh. The film is inspired by the real-life story of Sagarika Chakraborty and Anurup Bhattacharya, an Indian immigrant couple whose children were taken away by Norwegian authorities in 2011.

The film was theatrically released worldwide on 17 March 2023 and received mixed reviews from critics. Nonetheless, for her performance, Mukerji won several accolades including the National Film Award for Best Actress in a Leading Role, the Filmfare Award for Best Actress (Critics), and the IIFA Award for Best Actress.

== Plot ==
The film follows Debika, a Bengali Hindu immigrant who lives in Stavanger with her husband Aniruddha, son Shubh and five month old daughter Suchi. Two Norwegian Child Welfare Services "Velferd" employees visit them regularly on being reported by the Chatterjees' Norwegian neighbour before separating Shubh and Suchi from Debika during the last visit. This decision is based on a culture clash caused by an alleged misinterpretation of Debika's behaviours.

The Chatterjees are told that they are unfit to hold custody of their children, so Debika decides to win back custody of her children. However, the Chatterjees lose the case due to prevailing Orientalist, cultural imperialist and racist mindset of the Norwegian jury. Debika is branded as mentally unstable and unfit to parent the children. At the Norwegian child shelter, Debika fears the children would be subjected to brainwashing in order to make them forget their Indian identity so that they can be easily integrated into the Norwegian society. Soon Debika learns that the child welfare service is supposed to be a scam to extort from immigrants.

In a second hearing, a former Norwegian child welfare employee corroborates as a witnesses systemic biases against immigrants. Even though, her case is dismissed. Next, she learns of the children's foster location and takes them away to Sweden but is soon caught at the border. Debika is extradited back to Norway, facing charges that further complicate her case. Aniruddha, under pressure from the system blames Debika and divorces her, prioritizing his citizenship.

Debika relocates to India, where she enlists the help of lawyer Vasudha Kamat, her brother-in-law, and Abhijeet, a judge. She sues the Norwegian government through diplomatic channels, highlighting human rights violations. The case gains media attention, drawing support from Indian authorities and exposing flaws in Norway's handling of her children's welfare. Norwegian agents then attempt to botch the return of Debika's children, ensuring that even if the children leave Norway, they cannot be in Debika's care. In a high-stakes final court hearing, Debika testifies her strength as a mother and the cultural misunderstandings that led to the separation. The court rules in her favor, pressuring Norway to return the children. Debika reunites with Shubh and Suchi and live with her parents, once again united as family.

== Cast ==
- Rani Mukerji as Debika Chatterjee
- Anirban Bhattacharya as Aniruddha "Anirudh" Chatterjee, Debika's husband
- Jim Sarbh as Daniel Singh Ciupek
- Neena Gupta as Vasudha Kamat, Indian Minister of External Affairs
- Yuvaan Vanvari as Shubha Chatterjee, Debika and Anirudh's son
- Irha Ali as Suchi Chatterjee, Debika and Anirudh's daughter
- Bodhisvatta Majumdar as Debika's father
- Saswati Guhathakurta as Debika's mother
- Soumya Mukherjee as Anurag Chatterjee
- Ashok Mukherjee as Anirudh's father
- Mithu Chakrabarty as Anirudh's mother
- Balaji Gaur as Advocate Sunania Pratap
- Charu Shankar as Nandini
- Varun Vazir as Biswajeet Sarkar
- Namit as Sunil Kapoor
- Roopangi Vanvari as Rabia
- Sangram Singh as Harman Mehta
- Purnendu Bhattacharya as Madhusudhan Gavai
- Barun Chanda as Judge Abhijit Dutta
- Britta Soll as Matilda Magnus, Velfred officer
- Kärt Tammjärv as Sia Larson, Velfred officer
- Tiina Tauraite as Allis Ramsfjod
- Sara Soulié as Berit Hansen
- Kristjan Sarv as Lars Kristiansen

== Production ==
=== Development ===
Mrs. Chatterjee Vs Norway is the first Indian film to be shot in Estonia. The film was announced by Rani Mukerji in March 2021. The film also marks the Hindi film debut of the Bengali actor Anirban Bhattacharya.

The film is inspired by the real story of Sagarika Chakraborty and her husband Anurup Bhattacharya, an Indian couple living in Norway whose children were taken away by the Norwegian Child Welfare Services, whom the parent's claim had objections against parenting habits that are considered typical in Indian culture.

=== Filming ===
Principal photography began in August 2021. The first production schedule took place in Estonia and was completed by 21 September 2021. The film was wrapped up on 18 October 2021.

== Release ==
=== Theatrical ===
Mrs. Chatterjee Vs. Norway was theatrically released on 17 March 2023.

== Music ==
Mrs Chatterjee Vs Norway

Soundtrack album by Amit Trivedi
- Released: 2 March 2023
- Genre: Feature film soundtrack
- Length: 10:50
- Language: Hindi
- Label: Zee Music Company

Amit Trivedi chronology
Uunchai (2022)	Mrs Chatterjee Vs Norway (2023)	Ghoomer (2023)

Official audio
- Mrs Chatterjee Vs Norway - Full Album on YouTube

The music of the film is composed by Amit Trivedi, with lyrics written by Kausar Munir.

Track listing
No.	Title	Singer(s)	Length
1.	"Shubho Shubho"	Altamash Faridi	2:56
2.	"Maa Ke Dil Se"	Javed Ali, Dipakshi Kalita	3:33
3.	"Aami Jaani Re"	Madhubanti Bagchi	4:04
Total length:			10:50

== Reception ==
=== Critical reception ===
On the review aggregator website Rotten Tomatoes, 13% of 15 critics' reviews are positive, with an average rating of 4.7/10.

Zinia Bandyopadhyay of India Today gave the film 3.5 stars out of five and said, "The best thing about the film is, undoubtedly, Rani Mukerji’s performance. It is not a light watch, but something that is compelling and emotional. However, by the end, the film feels a bit stretched." Bollywood Hungama gave the film 3 stars out of five and said, "It is a hard-hitting drama and is laced with the career-best performance of Rani Mukerji." Monika Rawal of Hindustan Times said, "It remains a true-to-heart account of a gut-wreching story of a mother, but there are so many layers you wish the director dug deeper and explored with the main character."

Sukanya Verma of Rediff.com said, "Instead of feeling her desperation, despair or extreme acts stemming from a mother's primal need to protect her brood, what comes through is hollow theatrics." Saibal Chatterjee of NDTV gave the film 1.5 stars out of five and said, "It is an overheated affair that sucks the air out of an intrinsically moving story that deserved infinitely better." Udita Jhunjhunwala from Mint Lounge said, "It was hard to root for the Chatterjees in a film that has greater recall as a tear-soaked Bollywood drama than a recreation of a real life human-interest story."

=== Box office ===
The film collected ₹3.22 crore on its opening day with a release on 500 screens. The collections saw a 77.95% jump on the second day with the film collecting ₹4.55 crore. On the third day it earned ₹4.91 crore taking its first weekend collection to ₹12.68 crore. As of 20 April 2023, the film has grossed ₹36.53 crore worldwide with grossing 745K Norwegian Krones over the weekend, the film has become the highest grossing Bollywood film in Norway. It later became the most-watched South Asian film in Norway with 8356 admits.

=== Response from Norwegian authorities ===
The Norwegian Embassy in India issued a statement before the release of film:

There has been a lot of attention towards the film, Mrs Chatterjee vs Norway.

The film is a work of fiction, even though it is based on an actual case. The case being referred to was resolved a decade ago in cooperation with Indian authorities and with the agreement of all parties involved. To protect the children and the right to privacy the government can not comment on specific cases due to strict confidentiality regulations. However, some general facts must be set right;

- Children will never be taken away from their families based on cultural differences described. Eating with their hands or having children sleeping in bed with their parents are not considered practices harmful to children and are not uncommon in Norway, irrespective of cultural background.
- Child welfare is not driven by profit. The alleged claim that ‘the more children put into the foster system, the more money they make’ is completely false. Alternative care is a matter of responsibility, and not a money making entity.
- The reason for placing children in alternative care is if they are subject to neglect, violence or other forms of abuse.

— Royal Norwegian Embassy, New Delhi

They further wrote that they "sympathize with the affected families, particularly the children. For those involved, there is no denying that such experiences are difficult.″

Following the release of the film, Norwegian Ambassador Hans Jacob Frydenlund criticized the film, stating that "it incorrectly depicts Norway’s belief in family life and our respect for different cultures." This was countered by Sagarika Chakraborty (the real life person on whose ordeal the film is based) who condemned the statements made by him adding, "When the whole world can see the bond between me and my kids, the Norwegian Government continues to spread lies about her without even knowing her story." She also said that she's getting a lot of love from all over the world and people want to come and meet her after the film. Sagarika said that the Indian Government has helped her immensely. In an op-ed piece in the Indian Express, she specifically referred to the issues surrounding children sharing her bed and being fed.

Jone Skjelbred, Municipal Manager for children, young people and families in Stavanger municipality said that they ″do not want to comment on the case because none of the people who have worked on this case work for them anymore. As a result, they do not have enough knowledge of the matter.″ Gunnar Toresen, who was head of child protection in Stavanger municipality in 2011, said, ″This is not the story as it happened, but the film probably reflects the violent feelings that the case triggered in the family and in India,″ and points out that serious domestic disturbance calls had led the police to show up at the family's house prior to the decision to remove the children from the home. Sutapa Sen Biswas, the former president of Indian Society of Rogaland, has called the film "misleading" and said it "does not portray reality". She is also critical of the film leaving out the real reasons the children were removed from the home.

== Accolades ==
Award	Ceremony date	Category	Recipients	Result	Ref.
Indian Film Festival of Melbourne	11–20 August 2023	Best Actress	Rani Mukerji	Won	
Filmfare Awards	28 January 2024	Best Actress	Rani Mukerji	Nominated	
Filmfare Awards	28 January 2024	Best Actress (Critics)	Rani Mukerji	Won	
Zee Cine Awards	10 March 2024	Best Actor – Female	Rani Mukerji	Nominated	
Zee Cine Awards	10 March 2024	Best Actor (Critics) – Female	Rani Mukerji	Won	
IIFA Awards	28 September 2024	Best Actress	Rani Mukerji	Won	
National Film Awards	1 August 2025	Best Actress in a Leading Role	Rani Mukerji	Won	
