= Chalte Chalte (2003 film) =

2003 Indian film by Aziz Mirza

- Theatrical release poster
- Directed by: Aziz Mirza
- Screenplay by: Aziz Mirza; Robin Bhatt
- Dialogues by: Pramod Sharma; Ashish Kariya; Rumi Jaffery
- Produced by: Juhi Chawla; Shah Rukh Khan; Aziz Mirza
- Starring: Shah Rukh Khan; Rani Mukerji
- Cinematography: Ashok Mehta
- Edited by: Amitabh Shukla
- Music by: Songs: Jatin–Lalit; Aadesh Shrivastava; Score: Aadesh Shrivastava
- Production company: Dreamz Unlimited
- Distributed by: UTV Motion Pictures
- Release date: 13 June 2003
- Running time: 168 minutes
- Country: India
- Language: Hindi
- Budget: ₹11 crore (equivalent to ₹44 crore or US$4.6 million in 2026)
- Box office: ₹43.28 crore (equivalent to ₹174 crore or US$18 million in 2026)

Chalte Chalte (transl. On the Way) is a 2003 Indian Hindi-language romantic comedy drama film directed by Aziz Mirza. The film stars Shah Rukh Khan and Rani Mukerji in the lead roles. It marked the final production venture of Dreamz Unlimited prior to its rebranding as Red Chillies Entertainment in 2003.

Chalte Chalte released on 13 June 2003, and proved to be a commercial success at the box office, grossing ₹43.28 crore (US$5.4 million) worldwide. It received positive reviews from critics upon release, with praise for its theme, screenplay, soundtrack and the lead performances; however, some critics noted a thematic similarity between the film and Saathiya (2002), which also starred Mukerji in the lead. The film was screened at the Casablanca Film Festival.

At the 49th Filmfare Awards, Chalte Chalte received 5 nominations, including Best Actress (Mukerji) and Best Music Director (Jatin-Lalit).

== Plot ==
The film begins in a bowling alley, where a group of friends are awaiting the arrival of Salim. Meanwhile, Deepak arrives with his fiancée Sheetal. When a conversation about love arises, Deepak and the rest find it necessary to make Sheetal aware that true love does exist. They tell her the story of Raj and Priya, two of their closest friends.

Raj Mathur, a graduate of engineering, is the owner of Raj Transport, a small trucking company he founded himself. Raj is a carefree man who is unorganized, messy, lazy, and never on time. He is always happy.

On the other hand, Priya Chopra is a successful fashion designer from a wealthy family. Originally from Greece, she lives with her aunt Anna, who wants to give her the best in life. Priya has her life all planned out – the complete opposite of Raj. These two completely different people meet in a car accident when Priya crashes her car into Raj's truck. Though the two get off to a rocky start, they meet again at the wedding of Salim and Farah, eventually becoming friends. The two slowly fall in love.

Raj learns that Priya is engaged to a man named Sameer. Desperate, he follows Priya to Greece, where he continues to woo her. When it's time to part, Priya realizes that she is in love with Raj. They get married after persuading Priya's parents, and arrive in Mumbai, where Raj welcomes Priya into their home.

Back to the bowling alley in the present: Salim arrives along with Farah and announces that today was Raj and Priya's first wedding anniversary, so they were planning a surprise party. Excited, Sheetal can't wait to meet the famous Raj and Priya, but when they do arrive, they're nothing like what they seemed. The two can't stop arguing.

It is revealed that Raj feels the pressure to meet the expectations of Priya's family and is struggling financially. Priya cannot stand to see her husband in this state and secretly asks her former fiancé for money. When Raj learns of this truth, he gets really angry and accuses Priya of infidelity with Sameer, causing her to run away to her parents. Raj, realizing his error, goes after Priya, only to be insulted by her family.

Priya decides to leave for Greece because she can't stay with Raj but can't stay without him. When Raj is informed of this, he races to the airport to stop Priya. He says he will change and that he has a dream of the two of them starting a family together. Although Priya expresses that she has the same dream, she feels it is impossible for them to be together, so she boards the plane. Giving up, Raj remembers his oath of never giving up on their love and sends his talisman as a reminder to Priya. When Priya receives the talisman, she too recalls Raj's confession. Raj sadly returns home to find Priya waiting for him. She says that the only way to make their dream come true is to be together. In a playful manner, the two get into another argument but they say that this is how they express their love. They continue to argue as the credits roll.

== Cast ==
- Shah Rukh Khan as Raj Mathur
- Rani Mukerji as Priya Chopra
- Jas Arora as Sameer Arora, Priya's former fiancé
- Satish Shah as Manubhai Marfatiya
- Jayshree T. as Mrs. Manubhai Marfatiya
- Rajeev Verma as Kishore Chopra, Priya's father
- Lilette Dubey as Anna Mausi, Priya's aunt
- Johnny Lever as Nandu, a roadside drunkard
- Vishwajeet Pradhan as Vivek
- Suresh Bhagwat as a Dhobi
- Aditya Pancholi as a hostile businessman (special appearance)
- Dinyar Tirandaz as Irani
- Meghna Malik as Farah Zafar
- Suresh Menon as a Shopkeeper
- Masood Akhtar as a Paanwala
- Haidar Ali as a Postman
- Gagan Gupta as Tambi
- Vani Tripathi as a friend
- Sushmita Daan as a flower girl
- Arun Singh as a vegetable seller
- Akhtar Nawaz as a milkman
- Kamini Khanna as female plane passenger
- Bobby Darling as a friend
- Madhavi Chopra as a friend
- Jameel Khan as a traffic policeman

== Production ==
This was the third and final film produced by Shah Rukh Khan and Juhi Chawla's production company, Dreamz Unlimited. The publicity strategy of the film was designed by Dreamz Unlimited.

Filming took place in India and Greece. Two songs for the film were shot in Athens and the island of Mykonos.

According to Khan, Mukerji had been initially offered the role of Priya, but due to prior commitments with Shaad Ali's Saathiya (2002), she turned the role down. Post her refusal, Aishwarya Rai was signed for the role, but was removed from the film after problems occurred with her then-boyfriend, Salman Khan, who is said to have disrupted filming. After Rai's departure, Kajol had been offered the role, but declined due to her pregnancy at the time. This caused a considerable delay in the production of film, before Mukerji agreed to take over the role.

Mukerji had a complete makeover for the role, by MAC Cosmetics India director Mickey Contractor. Contrary to the Hindi-media prejudice of fair skin being considered more attractive, Mukerji and Contractor received praise for her new, tanned complexion, including their use of smoky-eye, which was subsequently used in other films, most notably in Mukerji's Hum Tum (2004), Veer-Zaara (2004) and Kabhi Alvida Naa Kehna (2006) which also starred Khan.

== Soundtrack ==
Chalte Chalte

Soundtrack album by Jatin–Lalit & Aadesh Shrivastava
- Released: 3 May 2003 (India)
- Genre: Feature film soundtrack
- Label: T-Series
- Producers: Jatin–Lalit; Aadesh Shrivastava

Jatin–Lalit chronology
Waah! Tera Kya Kehna (2002)	Chalte Chalte (2003)	Haasil (2003)

Aadesh Shrivastava chronology
Kash Aap Hamare Hote (2003)	Chalte Chalte (2003)	Baghban (2003)

Professional ratings
Review scores
Source	Rating
Bollywood Hungama	3.5/5 stars

The film's soundtrack was composed by the duo Jatin–Lalit and Aadesh Shrivastava. All the songs were written by Javed Akhtar, with the exception of "Layi Ve Na Gaye", written by Babu Singh Maan.

Joginder Tuteja of Bollywood Hungama gave the album 3.5 stars and stated "Chalte Chalte is a romantic album that should go well with both class as well as mass". According to the Indian trade website Box Office India, with around 18,00,000 units sold, this film's soundtrack album was the year's sixth highest-selling.

Vocals were provided by Abhijeet Bhattacharya, Alka Yagnik, Udit Narayan, Sonu Nigam, Sukhwinder Singh and Preeti & Pinky

=== Track listing ===
No.	Title	Lyrics	Music	Singer(s)	Length
1.	"Chalte Chalte"	Javed Akhtar	Jatin–Lalit	Abhijeet Bhattacharya, Alka Yagnik	06:39
2.	"Tauba Tumhare Yeh Ishaare"	Javed Akhtar	Jatin–Lalit	Abhijeet Bhattacharya, Alka Yagnik	05:18
3.	"Layi Ve Na Gaye"	Babu Singh Maan	Aadesh Shrivastava	Sukhwinder Singh	05:45
4.	"Gum Shuda"	Javed Akhtar	Aadesh Shrivastava	Sonu Nigam, Jayesh Gandhi	05:07
5.	"Dagariya Chalo"	Javed Akhtar	Jatin–Lalit	Udit Narayan, Alka Yagnik	06:21
6.	"Chalte Chalte"			Instrumental	05:02
7.	"Tujhpar Gagan Se (Not in the film)"	Javed Akhtar	Aadesh Shrivastava	Preeti & Pinky, Sukhwinder Singh	05:24
8.	"Suno Na Suno Na"	Javed Akhtar	Aadesh Shrivastava	Abhijeet Bhattacharya	05:28
9.	"Music Piece"			Chorus	01:46
10.	"Music Piece with Flute"			N/A	01:46
Total length:					48:36

== Box office ==
Chalte Chalte grossed ₹30.15 crore (US$3.1 million) in India and $2.81 million (₹13.13 crore) in other countries, for a worldwide total of ₹43.28 crore (US$4.5 million), against its ₹11 crore (US$1.1 million) budget. It had the third highest worldwide opening weekend of the year with figures of ₹12.38 crore (US$1.3 million). The film earned ₹20.14 crore (US$2.1 million) during its first week. Worldwide, it is the 4th-highest-grossing Hindi film of 2003.

=== India ===
It opened on Friday, 13 June 2003 across 280 screens, and earned ₹1.50 crore (US$160,000) nett on its opening day, which is the 7th highest first day of the year. In its opening weekend, the film grossed ₹4.52 crore (US$470,000) nett and is the 7th highest opening of the year. It grossed ₹8.23 crore (US$850,000) nett in its first week. The film earned a total of ₹19.44 crore (US$2.0 million) nett and is the 6th-highest-grossing film of 2003. When adjusted for inflation, its total nett gross is ₹69.68 crore (US$7.2 million). It was declared a "hit" by Box Office India.

=== Overseas ===
Outside India, it is the second highest opening of the year as it grossed $1.15 million (₹5.37 crore) in its opening weekend. It went on to gross $1.58 million (₹7.38 crore) in its first week. The film earned a total of $2.81 million (₹13.13 crore) and is the 2nd-highest-grossing film of 2003 behind another Khan-starrer Kal Ho Naa Ho.

== Critical reception ==
Film critic Taran Adarsh praised the film's writing and performances. He wrote, "Chalte Chalte clearly belongs to Shah Rukh Khan, an actor par excellence. One actually runs out of adjectives and personifications if asked to describe this performance by the actor." Vivek Fernandes of Rediff was less positive, and noted that the film "rides on a wafer-thin plot. What could have been an interesting study of marital relations disintegrates into soppy fare. And the blame lies entirely with the exasperatingly predictable screenplay and tacky dialogue."

== Awards ==
Award	Category	Recipients and nominees	Results
49th Filmfare Awards	Best Actress	Rani Mukerji	Nominated
49th Filmfare Awards	Best Music Director	Jatin–Lalit	Nominated
49th Filmfare Awards	Best Lyricist	Javed Akhtar for "Tauba Tumhare Yeh Ishaare"	Nominated
49th Filmfare Awards	Best Male Playback Singer	Abhijeet Bhattacharya for "Suno Na Suno Na"	Nominated
49th Filmfare Awards	Best Female Playback Singer	Alka Yagnik for "Tauba Tumhare Yeh Ishaare"	Nominated
5th IIFA Awards	Best Actress	Rani Mukerji	Nominated
10th Screen Awards	Best Actress	Rani Mukerji	Nominated
10th Screen Awards	Best Music Director	Jatin–Lalit and Aadesh Shrivastava	Nominated
7th Zee Cine Awards	Best Film	Juhi Chawla, Shahrukh Khan and Aziz Mirza	Nominated
7th Zee Cine Awards	Best Actress	Rani Mukerji	Nominated
7th Zee Cine Awards	Best Music Director	Jatin–Lalit and Aadesh Shrivastava	Nominated
7th Zee Cine Awards	Best Lyricist	Javed Akhtar for "Tauba Tumhare Yeh Ishaare"	Nominated
7th Zee Cine Awards	Best Male Playback Singer	Abhijeet Bhattacharya for "Tauba Tumhare Yeh Ishaare"	Nominated
1st Producers Guild Film Awards	Best Male Playback Singer	Abhijeet Bhattacharya for "Tauba Tumhare Yeh Ishaare"	Nominated
1st Producers Guild Film Awards	Best Cinematography	Ashok Mehta	Nominated
1st Stardust Awards	Star of the Year – Female	Rani Mukerji	Nominated
2004 Sansui Viewer's Choice Awards	Best Actress	Rani Mukerji	Nominated
2004 HT Café Film Awards	Best Actress	Rani Mukerji	Nominated
2004 Take One Awards (UK)	Best Actress	Rani Mukerji	Nominated
2004 Pogo Amazing Kids Awards	Most Amazing Actress	Rani Mukerji	Nominated
