= Dil Bole Hadippa! =

- Theatrical release poster
- Directed by: Anurag Singh
- Written by: Jaya-Aparajita
- Produced by: Aditya Chopra
- Starring: Rani Mukerji; Shahid Kapoor; Sherlyn Chopra; Anupam Kher; Dalip Tahil
- Cinematography: Sudeep Chatterjee
- Edited by: Ritesh Soni
- Music by: Songs: Pritam; Background Score: Julius Packiam
- Production company: Yash Raj Films
- Release date: 18 September 2009
- Running time: 148 minutes
- Country: India
- Language: Hindi
- Box office: ₹46.12 crore

Dil Bole Hadippa! (transl. The heart says hurray!) is a 2009 Indian Hindi-language sports comedy film directed by Anurag Singh and produced by Aditya Chopra under the Yash Raj Films banner. It stars Rani Mukerji and Shahid Kapoor.In the film, a young woman pretends to be a man so that she can join an all-male cricket team. It also stars Anupam Kher, Dalip Tahil, Rakhi Sawant and Sherlyn Chopra in supporting roles.

The film is an adaptation of the 2006 film She's the Man by Andy Fickman which was itself an adaptation of William Shakespeare's Twelfth Night. It was released on September 18, 2009.

ASTPL, an Indian software developer, also released a cricket mobile video game based on the film.

== Plot ==
Veera is a young woman who lives in a small village but dreams of playing cricket in the big league, being extremely talented in the game. Veera works in a nautanki and dances with the star performer, Shanno, an arrogant and conceited woman.

Rohan is an accomplished captain of a county cricket team in England. His father, Vicky, and mother, Yamini, are separated. Rohan lives with his mother in England and his father lives in India. Vicky has been captaining the Indian cricket team against the Pakistani cricket team in a tournament called the 'Aman Cup.' Every year, for 8 years, India has lost all matches. To win, Vicky pretends to have a heart attack and asks Rohan to come to India. When Rohan reaches India, he agrees to captain the team for his father, determined to make the team win.

Rohan holds auditions to select the best players, but when Veera goes to audition, she is not allowed to enter because players have to be male. Upset, Veera then disguises herself as a man named Veer and is accepted into the team. One day when a glass of juice is thrown in Veera's face, her hair falls, but she hides it and runs to the men's changing room. Rohan looks for "Veer", but finds Veera in the changing room instead. Veera quickly pretends to be Veer's sister to cover the disguise. Rohan argues with her but later asks "Veer" to bring him to Veera to apologise. Rohan falls in love with Veera as herself (he does not recognise her as Veer). Rohan and Veera go on a date and Veera falls in love with Rohan as well.

The big day of the match arrives, when India is set to play Pakistan in Lahore's Gaddafi Stadium. Rohan's mother arrives at the match and she and Rohan's father are reunited. In the match, Veer gets the other player out and everyone hugs her in joy. In the excitement, one of Veer's brown contact lenses falls out onto Rohan's finger and he realises that Veer is Veera. He argues with her about her deception and goes back to play the match without "Veer". Upset, Veer takes off her disguise, changing back to herself. When Rohan's team starts losing, Vicky tells Rohan that it isn't important to win or lose any more; he is happy that at least through the match, he and his mother came. But Rohan understands how badly his father wants to win this match, so he gets Veera to come back and play the match.

Veera puts her disguise back on and plays well, but in the closing stages, she is tripped by a Pakistan fielder. Rohan rushes to her aid and the medical unit says that Veera's arm is fractured, but she determinedly continues playing. She shows her talent by switching sides and batting with her left hand. They win the match and Rohan asks "Veer" to show his true identity. Everyone is shocked that Veer is actually a woman and accuses her of being a cheat. Veera then gives a heart-touching speech about women and their talents that become useless because of men's dominance. Everybody realises that talented women should be allowed to play with men in cricket teams and gives her a round of significant applause. Veera sees Rohan's love for her and the two are reunited.

== Cast ==
- Shahid Kapoor as Rohan Singh, Vicky's son
- Rani Mukerji as Veera Kaur / Veer Pratap Singh
- Anupam Kher as Chaudhary Vikramjeet Singh (Vicky), Rohan's father
- Dalip Tahil as Liyaqat Ali Khan (Lucky)
- Rakhi Sawant as Shanno Amritsari
- Sherlyn Chopra as Soniya Saluja
- Vimarsh Roshan
- Vallabh Vyas as Home Minister Parimal Chaturvedi
- Vrajesh Hirjee as Chamkila
- Poonam Dhillon as Yamini Singh (Vikram's wife)
- Shonali Nagrani as herself

== Production ==
Filming began on 17 July 2008. Shahid Kapoor's portions were shot in February 2009, since he was shooting for Kaminey from June to December 2008. Urmila Matondkar was initially offered to play a cameo role in the film, but she eventually opted out of the project. Sanjay Leela Bhansali had already bought rights for the title Hadippa. When Yash Raj Films requested him to give them rights for the title, Bhansali refused. Later, it was announced that the movie title would be Dil Bole Hadippa.

== Reception ==
=== Box office ===
It went on to collect a net of ₹ 31.72 crore, and was declared a "flop" by Box Office India.

=== Critical response ===
Taran Adarsh of Bollywood Hungama gave the film two out of five, calling it an "ordinary fare."Sukanya Verma of Rediff.com gave the film 2.5 out of 5, writing, "There's indulgence and there's overkill. But when it stretches beyond that, it's simply an excessive fest of clichés. In that sense alone, Dil Bole Hadippa, though not necessarily a bad film, suffers from too many déjà vu-evoking distractions to wholly work."

== Soundtrack ==
Dil Bole Hadippa!

Soundtrack album by Pritam
- Released: 12 August 2009
- Recorded: YRF Studios; Mumbai, India
- Genre: Film soundtrack
- Length: 30:17
- Label: YRF Music
- Producer: Pritam

Pritam chronology
Love Khichdi (2009)	Dil Bole Hadippa! (2009)	All the Best: Fun Begins (2009)

The soundtrack of Dil Bole Hadippa had been composed by Pritam with lyrics provided by Jaideep Sahni. The melody composition for the track "Ishq Hi Hai Rab" was composed by Mukhtar Sahota, a United Kingdom-based music director. The film score was composed by Julius Packiam.

=== Track listing ===
No.	Title	Singers	Length
1.	"Gym Shim"	Joshilay	03:17
2.	"Bhangra Bistar"	Alisha Chinoy, Sunidhi Chauhan, Hard Kaur	04:45
3.	"Ishq Hi Hai Rab"	Sonu Nigam, Shreya Ghoshal, Mukhtar Sahota	05:25
4.	"Discowale Khisko"	KK, Sunidhi Chauhan, Rana Mazumder	04:26
5.	"Hadippa"	Mika Singh	04:08
6.	"Discowale Khisko" (Remix)	Master Saleem	04:14
7.	"Hadippa" (Remix)	Mika Singh, Sunidhi Chauhan	04:17

== In popular culture ==
After Justin Trudeau was first elected Prime Minister of Canada in 2015, an older video of him dancing to the theme song of the movie surfaced.
