= Dance Premier League =

- Title card
- Genre: Dance reality
- Presented by: Hussain Kuwajerwala; Eijaz Khan; Sara Khan
- Judges: Rani Mukerji; Shiamak Davar
- Country of origin: India
- Original language: Hindi
- No. of seasons: 1
- No. of episodes: 24

Production
- Production location: Mumbai, India
- Cinematography: surindra rao
- Camera setup: Multi-camera
- Running time: Approx. 52 minutes

Original release
- Network: Sony TV
- Release: 9 October – 26 December 2009

Dance Premier League is an Indian dance reality show that premiered on Sony Entertainment Television on 9 October 2009. The series is judged by the known Bollywood film actress Rani Mukerji, and famous Indian choreographer Shiamak Davar who guides all six teams as an 'umpire'. The series replaced Sony TV's long running dance show Boogie Woogie.

== Format ==
- The show consists of six teams, consisting of eight dancers each, that are chosen at auditions across India. One of the six teams consists of NRIs.
- Each zonal team will play against every other zone.
- Each match will have a solo, a duo and a group round. The tally of all three rounds will decide the winner.
- The scoring is like cricket runs, e.g., duck, single, boundary, sixer, etc. The winning team gets 2 points.
- At the end of each match, awards are also given just like cricket, e.g., Man of the match, most 6's, most 4's etc.
- After the league matches the top four teams will play semifinals and then the top two will fight in the finals.
- The points are awarded by the choreographers whose teams have not performed on the day. Shiamak Davar, aworld renowned choreographer is the match umpire and he can question or raise an objection to the points awarded.
- Rani Mukerji, DPL ki Rani (Queen), will choose the man of the match and also award runs for the performances.
- Man of the match gets 6 runs and these runs are added to the Round 3 score of their team.

== Teams ==
Team	Uttar Ke Puttar [North Zone]	Southern Sizzlers [South Zone]	Eastern Tigers [East Zone]	Western Yodhas [West Zone]	Central Surmas [Central Zone]	Desi Pardesi [NRI team]
Choreographer	Pappu and Maalu	Nagendra Prasad and Swaroop	Uma and Gaiti	Harshal and Vitthal	Mini	Howard
Official Supporter*	Salman Khan	Prabhu Deva	Bipasha Basu	Kareena Kapoor	Himesh Reshammiya	Sohail Khan
Participants	Sadhika Sharma	Madan Kumar AV	Deepu Singh	Puneet Cheema	Rohit Thakur	Priyanka
Participants	Varun Mishra	Sneha	Bhimbahadur Gurumg	Vishal Sarvaiya	Prachi Bhosle	Ruel Dausan Varandani
Participants	Aadi Kumar	Vijay Babu	Pratap Singh	Karthik Mohan	Upasana Madan	Kalpita Desai
Participants	Chirag Agarwal	Kishen B.A	Vishay Singh	Prashant Mohan	Ankita Rana	Pravin
Participants	Harish Chaudar	Bindu Prasarna	Monalisa Mandal	Rahul Khot	Tejas Patil	Serena Unadkat
Participants	Dinesh Mudiyar	Sohan Giri	Antareepa Bora	Santosh Kapdi	Anup Bhargav	Alisha Pranjivan
Participants	Annie	Anusha	Sharmi Bose	Shashank Malli	Neharika Soni	Parth Dani
Participants	Sahaj Singh	Taraq Xavier	Binaisha Deshmukh	Karishma Chavan	Sanket Pathak	Karen Pereira

=== Slogans and points ===
Team	Slogan	Match 1	Match 2	Match 3	Match 4	Match 5	Total
Uttar Ke Puttar	Doodh Makhan Khayenge, Chakke Chudake Jayenge	2	0	2	0	1	5
Southern Sizzlers [3rd Place]	Rasam Ki Kasam, Jala Denge Hum	0	0	0	2	2	4
Eastern Tigers	Apna Jalwa Hai, Baki Sab Halwa Hai	0	2	0	0	0	2
Western Yodhas [Winner]	Hamari Thaath Hai, Baki Sabki Waat Hai	2	2	2	2	1	9
Central Surmas [2nd Place]	Hum Hain Surma, Bana Denge Sabka Churma	2	2	0	0	2	6
Desi Pardesi	Hum Pardesi, Kar Denge Sabki Aisi Taisi	0	0	2	2	0	4

- The Official supporters! came to the auditions merely to promote their movies which released at the time. These "official supporters" did not appear on the show.

== Fixtures ==
Date	Match	Score (R1+R2+R3)	Winning Team	Man of the Match
23 October	Uttar Ke Puttar v/s Southern Sizzlers	UKP: 14+17+16 = 47 SS: 10+12+18 = 40	Uttar Ke Puttar	Bindu • Southern Sizzlers
24 October	Eastern Tigers v/s Western Yodhas	ET: 12+14+26 = 52 WY: 19+20+30 = 69	Western Yodhas	Vishal • Western Yodhas
30 October	Central Surmas v/s Desi Pardesi	CS: 18+16+30 = 64 DP: 14+14+13 = 41	Central Surmas	Tejas • Central Surmas
31 October	Uttar Ke Puttar v/s Eastern Tigers	UKP: 16+22+12 = 50 ET: 11+20+30 = 61	Eastern Tigers	Bhimbahadur and Binaisha • Eastern Tigers
6 November	Southern Sizzlers v/s Central Surmas	SS: 10+20+16 = 46 CS: 15+20+31 = 66	Central Surmas	Prachi and Ankita • Central Surmas
7 November	Western Yodhas v/s Desi Pardesi	WY: 24+31+10+6=71 DP: 21+21+26=68	Western Yodhas	Santosh • Western Yodhas
13/14 November	Uttar Ke Puttar v/s Central Surmas	UP: 23+30+22=81 CS: 23+21+20=64	Uttar Ke Puttar	Dinesh • Uttar Ke Puttar
13/14 November	Eastern Tigers v/s Desi Pardesi	ET: 31+20+22=73 DP: 31+17+27=75	Desi Pardesi	Ruel and Priyanka • Desi Pardesi
13/14 November	Southern Sizzlers v/s Western Yodhas	SS: 19+20+21=60 WY: 15+27+37=79	Western Yodhas	Karthik • Western Yodhas
20/21 November	Uttar Ke Puttar v/s Desi Pardesi	UP: 21+22+26=69 DP: 21+24+20+6=71	Desi Pardesi	Karen • Desi Pardesi
20/21 November	Southern Sizzlers v/s Eastern Tigers	SS: 21+22+27=70 ET: 16+18+29+6=69	Southern Sizzlers	Antareepa • Eastern Tigers
20/21 November	Western Yodhas v/s Central Surmas	WY: 24+24+30+6=84 CS: 18+26+30=74	Western Yodhas	Karthik and Vishal • Western Yodhas
27/28 November	Southern Sizzlers v/s Desi Pardesi	SS: 30+20+28+6=84 DP: 16+24+30=70	Southern Sizzlers	Tharak • Southern Sizzlers
27/28 November	Uttar Ke Puttar v/s Western Yodhas	UKP: 18+14+27+6=65 WY: 23+20+22=65	Uttar Ke Puttar & Western Yodhas	Dinesh • Uttar Ke Puttar
27/28 November	Eastern Tigers v/s Central Surmas	ET: 20+23+26+6=75 CS: 24+30+24=78	Central Surmas	Binaisha • Eastern Tigers
12 December	1st Semi-final
18 December	2nd Semi-final
19 December	Match for 3rd position
25 December	Face off between choreographers
26 December	Finals		Western Yodhas	Karthik • Western Yodhas (Man of the Series)
