= Norwegian Child Welfare Services =

Public agencies responsible for child welfare in Norway

The Norwegian Child Welfare Services (Norwegian: Barnevernet; 'child protection') is the public agency responsible for child welfare in Norway. They consist of services in each municipality, which are aided and supervised by different governmental bodies at the state as well as the county level.

The Child Welfare Services' statutory obligation is "to ensure that children and youth who live in conditions that may be detrimental to their health and development receive the necessary assistance and care at the right time." Roughly 3% of all children in Norway receive some sort of measure from the Child Welfare Services, most of them in the form of relief measures to the child and their parents (such as counselling, advice, external support contacts, access to day care etc.). In about one quarter of the cases, the children are placed outside their homes (mainly in foster families or institutions) after care orders.

As of Q2 2026, the Norwegian government has been convicted for violating human rights, in 24 cases at the European Court of Human Rights during the last nine years.

== Organisation ==
The Norwegian Child Welfare Services were established and regulated under the terms of the Child Welfare Act of 1992, which has the purpose "to ensure that children and youth who live in conditions that may be detrimental to their health and development receive the necessary assistance and care at the right time," and "to help ensure children and youth grow up in a secure environment".

The Ministry of Children and Equality (Norwegian Barne- og likestillingsdepartementet, abbreviated BLD) holds the chief jurisdiction over child welfare issues and is responsible for developing regulations and guidelines, but is not involved in individual cases.

Each of the Norwegian municipality is obliged to have Child Welfare Services. These are responsible for the local and year-to-year implementation of the Child Welfare Act (such as preventive work, investigation, support service, approval of foster families, follow-up of children placed in foster families or institutions). This "municipal child welfare" is aided by two agencies that constitute the "governmental child welfare":

- The Norwegian Directorate for Children, Youth and Family Affairs (Norwegian Barne-, ungdoms- og familiedirektoratet, abbreviated Bufdir) is a governmental body responsible for the "theoretical" aspects of child welfare (interpretation of the law and commissioning and dissemination of research).
- The Office for Children, Youth and Family Affairs (Norwegian Barne-, ungdoms- og familieetaten, abbreviated Bufetat) is a governmental body responsible for the "practical" aspects of child welfare (approval and management of child welfare institutions, recruitment and training of foster families).

In addition, the following bodies at the county level are involved in child welfare:

- The County Social Welfare Boards (Norwegian Fylkesnemnda for barnevern og sosiale saker) function as tribunals that have to approve of any compulsory measures and care orders (i.e., decisions that parents lose custody of their child). It has an autonomous position in relation to the Ministry and the County Governor.
- The County Governors, representing the governmental authority at the county level, supervise the activities of the municipalities and child welfare institutions and handle appeals.

== Support and assistance ==
The Child Welfare Services are responsible for implementing measures for children and their families in situations where there are special needs in relation to the home environment. Assistance may be provided as counselling, advisory services, and aid measures, including external support contacts, relief measures in the home, and access to day care.

Under the guidelines of the Norwegian Child Welfare Services, children are entitled to participate in decisions involving their personal welfare, and have the right to state their views in accordance with their age and level of maturity. This applies especially in cases where there are administrative and legal proceedings that will strongly affect the children's day-to-day lives.

== Duties ==
The Child Welfare Services are required to take action if measures implemented in the home environment are not sufficient to safeguard the child's needs. In such cases, the Child Welfare Service may place children under foster care in consultation with the parents, in a child welfare institution, or introduce specific parent–child measures.

Removing a child from the home without parental consent is a measure of last resort in cases of (justifiable suspicion of) serious neglect, maltreatment, violence, abuse, trafficking etc. This requires a decision from the County Social Welfare Board on the basis of a recommendation submitted by the municipal authorities. In urgent cases (i.e. imminent danger for the physical or mental health of the child), the municipal welfare services are entitled (and obliged) to issue a provisional care order. Provisional care orders expire after six weeks unless they are confirmed by the County Social Welfare Board. Decisions taken by the County Social Welfare Board may only be overturned by the courts.

The municipal Child Welfare Services are charged with monitoring the development of children who have been placed in care outside their homes as well as their parents.

Child Welfare Service employees are privy to a large amount of personal client information, and must comply with strict rules of confidentiality. However, information may be provided to other administrative agencies when this is necessary for carrying out child welfare service tasks.

== Statistics ==
According to figures provided by Statistics Norway, 36,800 children received measures from the Norwegian Child Welfare Services at the end of 2015. This means that 2.9% of all children in Norway received some sort of measure. Of these, 12% were aged 0–2 years, 23% 3–5 years, 30% 6–12 years, and 35% 13–17 years. In addition, 6,800 young people aged 18–22 years (1.1% of their age class) received follow-up care.

60% of the 36,800 children received support measures within their families. 16% received support measures while placed outside their homes with the consent of their parents. In the remainder 24% of the cases, children were placed outside their homes after care orders. Of the 14,850 children living outside their homes by the end of 2015, 72% lived in foster families, 14% were old enough to live by themselves with follow-up from the Child Welfare Services, and 8% were taken care of in institutions, while 5% where temporarily placed in private homes awaiting other solutions.

The main reasons for measures (both support measures and care measures) were lacking parenting skills (29%), parents' mental problems (17%), high domestic conflict level (11%) and parents' drug misuse (8%).

Statistics Norway has also published some figures according to immigration status: while 2.2% of all children with Norwegian parents received measures, the corresponding figures were 3.2% for children born in Norway by immigrant parents, and 4.9% for immigrant children. The latter group includes minor asylum seekers arriving without parents.

== Parents' Satisfaction with the Norwegian Child Welfare Services ==
An interview study on parents' experiences of contact with the Norwegian Child Welfare Services indicated variable experiences; however, there were still more parents reporting exclusively positive than exclusively negative experiences. A survey study suggested fair overall satisfaction of parents with the services, with three-quarters of the parents finding their case manager courteous and respectful but less than half of the parents satisfied with finding information on measures offered by the services. Several factors were associated with higher parental satisfaction, including child welfare workers' competence, degree of parental involvement in decision-making processes, and quality of information provided.

One study examining parental experiences with foster care placements with Norwegian Child Welfare Services revealed that parents reported difficulties with loss of identity in their role as parents. In a research report, follow-up of parents with children in foster care was presented as important for social inclusion and better mental health of parents.

== National and international criticism ==
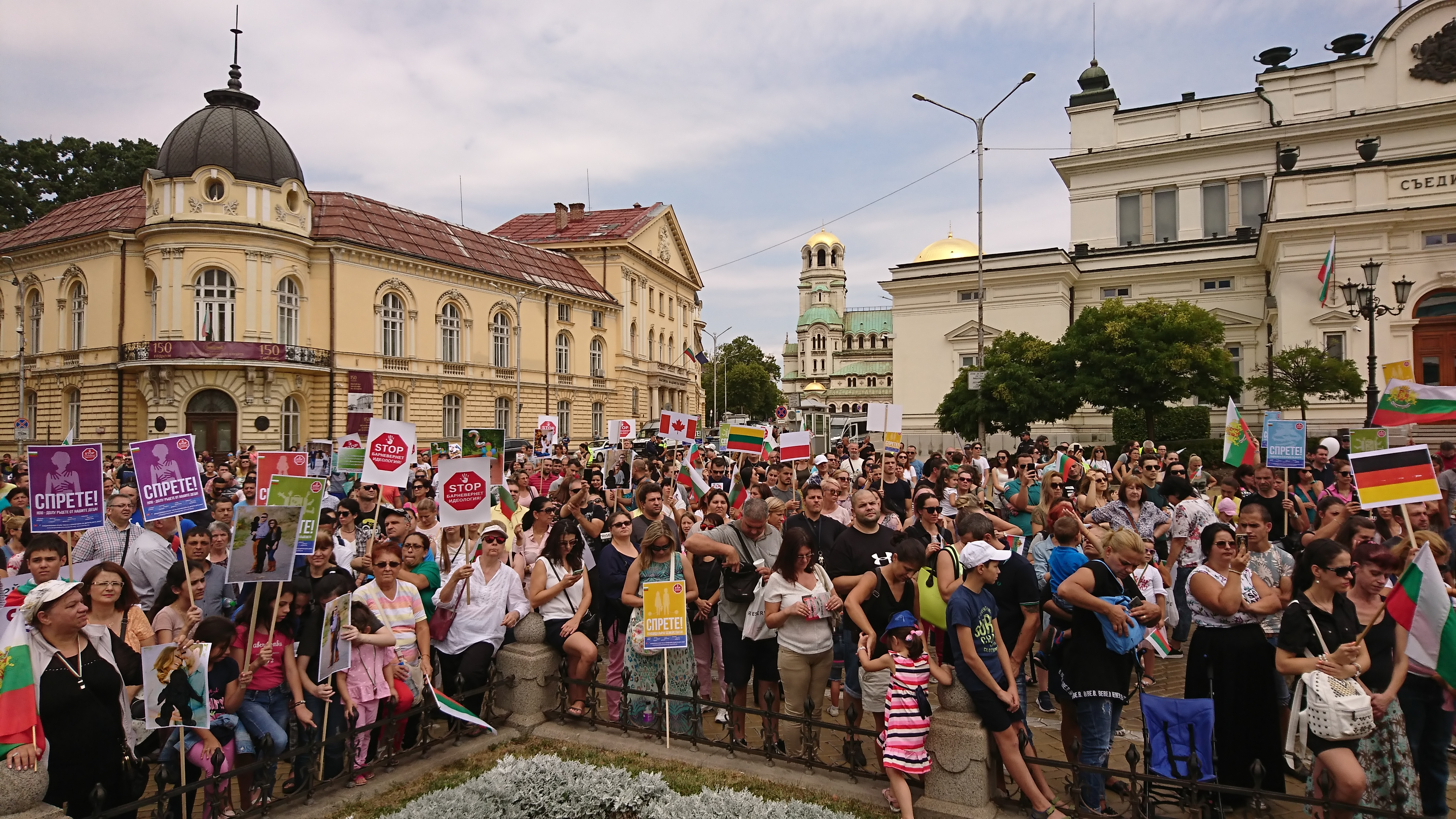
A protest against Barnevernet in Sofia, Bulgaria

The Norwegian Child Welfare Services are periodically the subject of public criticism, generally on two main issues. On the one hand, they are criticised for detecting too few cases of parental neglect and helping children too late (i.e., for having a too high threshold for taking action). On the other hand, they are criticised for taking over custody too easily (i.e., for having a too low threshold for taking action). Taken together, the overall criticism is that the service is slow to take action but heavy handed when it does. Due to their duty of confidentiality, the Norwegian Child Welfare Services themselves cannot participate in public debates of single cases.

The Norwegian Child Welfare Services are obliged to ensure the well-being of all children residing in Norway, irrespective of their (or their parents') nationality. While Norwegian legislation, following the United Nations Convention on the Rights of the Child, treats children as legal subjects in their own rights, some cultures regard children as the sole responsibility of the family. In several cases, therefore, culture clashes seem to exacerbate conflicts between the Child Welfare Services and immigrant parents. Children with a foreign mother are four times more likely than other children in Norway to be forcibly taken from their families and the number of children taken into emergency care rose by 50% in just 5 years (from 2008 to 2013) with the commonest reason for a care order now being simply "lack of parenting skills".

The European Court of Human Rights (ECtHR) have by 2019 accepted twenty six separate hearings against Norway for the activity of its Child Welfare agency since December 2015. The ECHR rendered a judgement in one of these cases on the 7th of September, 2017 with a judgement of "No violation of Article 8". However, on the 10th of September 2019, the Grand Chamber found a violation of Article 8 (the right to respect for family life) on account of shortcomings in the decision-making process leading to the adoption of a boy who had been placed in foster care in the judgment of Strand Lobben and Others v. Norway.

- Pavel Astakhov, former Russian children's ombudsman, made the allegation that the Norwegian Child Welfare Services abducts children from Russia in order to solve "population problems", in what was characterised as propaganda and misinformation by editor in chief of the Barents Observer, Thomas Nilsen.
- Approximately 4000 people who were formerly taken into custody by the child welfare have sought compensation for suffering and abuse while living in orphanages or foster families between 1945 and 1980. Of these, 2637 have received compensation, in total $220 million (2010).
- The services have been severely criticized by the Government of India for taking away two children from an Indian couple who were working in Norway. The case involved Norway's foreign minister (Jonas Gahr Støre) meeting with a special envoy from India in 2012. The father of the two children said to a local newspaper that The Norwegian Child Welfare Service had said the mother was force feeding the children. His point of view was that this was just "cultural difference" and that "it is not easy to understand Norwegian rules for a foreigner". Berit Aarset, who heads Human Rights Alert, Norway, has called the incident "state kidnapping". She says, "This is not the first time such a thing is happening in Norway... the legal system favours the Child Welfare Services and they do what they want all the time... quite often when a Norwegian is married to a non-Norwegian they also do the same thing; they also do this to asylum seekers and in almost every case they say one of the parents has a mental problem just to make their case strong... that is what has happened in [this] case too."
- In two widely publicized cases, the Polish private investigator Krzysztof Rutkowski has helped "kidnap" children (a Russian-born boy and a Polish girl) from Norwegian foster care in order to reunite them with their biological parents. The boy tried to look for help via mail (although he had banned access) to the Russian authorities. He eventually fled from the substitute family with the help of Polish detective. In spite of the threat of prosecution, her mother returned to Norway for her younger son, so far however unsuccessfully. Later Norwegian authorities’ claim for return of the girl has been declined by a Polish court as unjustified. The girl has purportedly been manipulated to confirm that she was mistreated by her parents.
- In May 2011, the two sons of a Czech family Michálák were removed by the Child Welfare Services due to the notifications from school nurses of child sexual abuse by the father; allegations denied by the couple and by the police officers. Parents were exonerated, but although their children were taken only under interim measures, they were not returned. The mother, Eva Michaláková, who has since divorced her husband and continues to reside in Norway, has continued to pursue custody of her children through various channels, including the European Court of Human Rights, where her complaint was rejected without prejudice for non-exhaustion of domestic remedies. The children were separated by social workers and assigned to Norwegian families. The Czech President, Miloš Zeman, compared the organization to the Nazi Lebensborn program, with the claim that the children's organization is raising young Norwegians and that they are so called "de-nationalized". In the Chamber of Deputies of the Parliament of the Czech Republic, and the foreign minister Lubomír Zaorálek has sent a diplomatic note to Oslo regarding the matter. Several other Czech politicians also got involved in efforts to get the children back to their mother, including Jitka Chalánková (MP), Tomáš Zdechovský (MEP) and Petr Mach (MEP). In January 2015, the Norwegian Embassy in Prague published a press release "clarify[ing] some issues regarding the Norwegian child welfare system in the hope that this will help in understanding" this case. However, the Norwegian Embassy soon removed the article. The mother could see her sons twice a year for fifteen minutes. She has however lost her parental rights to both children in 2015, since then she has no right to see them at all. The organization justified its decision among other things by too high media coverage of the case and that the children became accustomed to the foster parents. The children were placed in different foster families, so they cannot speak Czech anymore, they cannot meet each other and are forced to forget their Czech background and roots. In January 2020 the Czech District Court in Hodonín formally commit to care both sons to mother although they are kept in hidden places in Norway and information about them are kept as a secret also for the Czech state.
- In November 2015, a Romanian-Norwegian couple of Pentecostal faith were accused of using physical discipline against their children, and all five children were removed from their custody. In June 2016, the municipality came to terms with the parents, and the children were re-united with their parents. All five children have been returned to their family after a settlement was reached, a county board hinting they will rule against the agency.
- A Romanian family's two children were removed in October 2015. Their daughter was filmed while playing and said she has been slapped by her parents. After one year, the Nord-Troms District Court ruled against the agency and decided to return the children to their family.
- In 2016, a Norwegian family's twin daughters were removed shortly after birth due to the mother's alleged "undetermined mental disability" supposedly diagnosed 11 years earlier when she was 13 years old. The family took Norwegian Child Welfare Services to court, after 7 months eventually they were granted timely care over their biological daughters. Fearing that their daughters may be taken away once again, they fled to Poland and settled in the city of Katowice. On behalf of Norway, they were sought by Interpol as fugitives who kidnapped their own children. In January 2017, the news reached them that the mother was pronounced fully sane, and that they won full custody over their children, however in the end they decided to stay in Poland.
- In May 2017, a Norwegian woman named Silje Garmo fled to Poland with her 1-year-old daughter; the woman claimed she feared the baby would be taken away by Norwegian social services on inflated charges of overusing painkillers and chronic fatigue. Garmo asked for asylum in Poland and was later aided juridically by the Polish Catholic lawyers' association Ordo Iuris. According to the media, in mid-December 2018 the Polish Ministry of Foreign Affairs withdrew their initial objections and consented to Garmo's request. If confirmed, Garmo would be the first Norwegian citizen accepted as a refugee in Europe since the Second World War. Silje Garmo obtained asylum protection in Poland.
- Polish consul Sławomir Kowalski was expelled from Norway after allegedly having acted in a threatening manner towards employees of the Norwegian Child Welfare Services.

On 1 July 2021, in three more cases, Norway was convicted in ECtHR. Two of the cases dealt with limited visitation while child was placed with foster parents - and in one of those cases, the mother was only permitted to see her child, four times per year; the third case dealt with a forced adoption.

== In popular culture ==
- Mrs. Chatterjee vs Norway is a 2023 Indian Hindi-language film. The film is based on the true story of the previously mentioned Indian couple, an adaptation based on Sagarika Chakraborty's autobiography The Journey of a Mother as the mother whose children were taken away by the Barnevernet in 2011. The film depicts how she fought institutionalized white saviour practices and racism in Norway and how she regained the custody of her children after several legal battles lasting three years.
- Fjord (2026) is based on the Bodnariu family case.

== Relevant legislation ==
- Lov av 8.4.1981 nr. 7 om barn og foreldre (barnelova) [Act of 8 April 1981 No. 7 relating to Children and Parents (the Children Act)].
- Lov av 17.7.1992 nr. 100 om barneverntjenester (barnevernloven) [Act of 17 July 1992 No. 100 relating to Child Welfare Services (the Child Welfare Act)].
- Lov av 21.5.1999 nr. 30 om styrking av menneskerettighetenes stilling i norsk rett (menneskerettsloven) [Act of 21 May 1999 No. 30 relating to Strengthening of the Position of Human Rights in Norwegian Legislation (the Human Rights Act)] (declaring the Convention on the Rights of the Child as Norwegian law).
- Lov av 4.9.2015 nr. 85 om gjennomføring av konvensjon 19. oktober 1996 om jurisdiksjon, lovvalg, anerkjennelse, fullbyrdelse og samarbeid vedrørende foreldremyndighet og tiltak for beskyttelse av barn (lov om Haagkonvensjonen 1996) [Act of 4 September 2015 relating to Implementation of Convention of 19 October 1996 on Jurisdiction, Applicable Law, Recognition, Enforcement and Co-operating in Respect of Parental Responsibility and Measures for the Protection of Children (Act on the Hague Convention)].
