= Mardaani (film series) =

Indian film series

Mardaani Trilogy
- Created by: Gopi Puthran
- Original work: Mardaani (2014)
- Owner: Yash Raj Films
- Years: 2014–2026

Films and television
- Film(s): Mardaani (2014); Mardaani 2 (2019); Mardaani 3 (2026)

Mardaani is an Indian Hindi-language crime-thriller film series produced by Aditya Chopra under Yash Raj Films. It follows police officer Shivani Shivaji Roy (Rani Mukerji) as she takes on powerful criminal networks, exposing and dismantling systems of violence against women. The first instalment Mardaani, directed by Pradeep Sarkar, released on 22 August 2014. Its sequel Mardaani 2, directed by Gopi Puthran, released on 13 December 2019. The third and final instalment Mardaani 3, directed by Abhiraj Minawala, was released on 30 January 2026.

The films have explored social issues such as human trafficking, child abduction, systemic misogyny, and violence against women such as rape and serial killings.

== Overview ==
=== Mardaani (2014) ===
The film opens with a secret police operation orchestrated by Shivani Shivaji Roy, a dedicated Crime Branch Senior Inspector of the Mumbai Police, in order to catch a pimp named Rahman from his hideout. She barges in with her team and arrests Rahman, and rescues his mistress. Shivani lives with her husband, Dr. Bikram Roy, and teenage niece, Meera. Prior to the film, she rescued an orphaned girl named Pyaari from being sold by her uncle, and started looking after her like her own daughter. One day, Shivani finds out that Pyaari has been missing from her shelter home for five days and begins an investigation, where she finds out that the mastermind behind this kidnapping is a Delhi-based kingpin named Karan Rastogi (Tahir Raj Bhasin), who runs a cartel involving child trafficking and drugs. Shivani takes the task personally, going beyond her job and duties to nab Karan.

Shivani forces Rahman to reveal the names of Karan's associates and comes across Sunny Katyal (Anant Vidhaat Sharma), a car-dealer who operates Karan's trafficking business in Mumbai. Karan discovers that Shivani is monitoring his cartel's activities and tries to have Katyal killed for becoming a liability. However, Shivani saves Katyal, and he agrees to help her nab Karan. Determined to catch him, Shivani tracks down Karan's aide, Wakeel. Karan, angered, makes sure that Pyaari is sold and raped every day. As a warning, he spreads fake news that Shivani's husband has misused his profession as a doctor to molest a female patient, causing Bikram to be thrown off-duty. He then chops off one of Pyaari's fingers and sends it to Shivani's house in a gift box. Meanwhile, Karan's right-hand man Mattu (Aman Uppal) gets a contract to host a party full of prostitutes from a man named Tandon on behalf of a minister in Delhi, Taneja ji. Mattu also kills one of the girls in Karan's brothel at his orders when she contracts dengue, further scaring Pyaari.

Shivani travels to Delhi and sets up a trap involving decoy drug dealers from Nigeria, who pretend to offer expensive and rare South American cocaine to Karan and Wakeel. As they are negotiating, Shivani barges in with her team. While Karan escapes, Wakeel tries to erase evidence by destroying his mobile phone's SIM card, then commits suicide. Shivani and her Delhi-based teammate Balwinder Singh Sodhi track down a tailor who knew Wakeel for a long time. He reveals that a prostitute named Meenu Rastogi was Wakeel's closest associate. Shivani's continued investigation leads her to Karan's house, where Meenu, revealing herself as Karan's mother, sedates her.

She is abducted and brought to Karan's party. There, Shivani reunites with Pyaari, where she and the other girls are forced to work as prostitutes. Karan invites Taneja ji and allows him to rape Shivani. However, she escapes and ruthlessly beats Taneja before taking him hostage. Shivani single-handedly confronts the situation, forcing Karan into a small room and rescuing the girls. She challenges Karan to fight her when he teases her for being a woman and beats him. Feeling that he might escape the law, given the corrupt police and judicial system, she hands Karan over to the girls, who beat him to death. Subsequently, Sodhi and the entire team barge in and arrest Mattu, Tandon and Karan’s gang members. Meenu is also attacked by the girls and gets paralyzed by shock while Taneja survives before being sentenced to life imprisonment.

=== Mardaani 2 (2019) ===
In Kota, Rajasthan, a 21-year-old psychopath named Sunny kidnaps a young outspoken woman named Latika. He brutally tortures, rapes, and then murders her. Shivani Shivaji Roy, who has qualified in UPSC Examination has been appointed as the new Superintendent of Police of Kota, arrives at the crime scene and clashes with her misogynistic subordinate DSP Brij Shekhawat. The brutality of Latika's assault disturbs Shivani and makes her more determined to catch the killer.

Sunny, who has actually come to Kota from Meerut on a killing contract given by politician Govind Mishra a.k.a. Panditji, sees Shivani on TV when she publicly promises to find Latika's killer. He taunts Shivani by sneaking into her home and stealing her sari. He then dresses up as a woman, tricks a journalist named Kamal Parihar, and kills him; he also hires Pravin, a tea-seller near the police station, to kill Kamal's wife, Aabha Parihar, in a suicide blast, then takes Pravin's place as tea-seller to keep an eye on Shivani, introducing himself as a mute boy named Bajrang.

When Shivani brings in Lahanya, a child from the slums who had witnessed the blast, Sunny kills him. Following the media uproar on the failure of the police to catch the murderer, Shivani is set to be transferred from Kota. As the new investigating officer will take charge after two days, Shivani, along with her fellow officers, decide to catch Sunny within that time. Shivani makes peace with Shekhawat since his network of informers is very strong in the city, and he leads them to his contact, who reveals that the real mastermind behind Kamal Parihar's murder is a youth politician named Viplav Beniwal. Shivani arrests Beniwal's right-hand man Kunwar and tortures him into revealing Sunny's whereabouts. After Sunny kidnaps another outspoken woman, the police track him down. They discover his victim already raped and tortured, but barely alive, and manage to save her.

Sunny, posing as Bajrang, gets a lift from Shivani. Before he can strangle her, Shivani stops him, having realized that Bajrang is Sunny. The two fight but Sunny escapes. The police finds a video of Sunny taken by a bystander, and Shivani has it made viral across social media. Sunny kidnaps Panditji's granddaughter Priyanka for avenging his disrepute and threatens to kill her unless Shivani apologizes to him in a video made public. Shivani and the police barely manage to save Priyanka when another blast happens in the same spot. Shivani is running out of time to catch Sunny and bring him forward.

On the next day, which is Diwali, Shivani attends a live TV show on a news channel where she is questioned by Amit Sharma, the host, shadowing women's capabilities on grounds conventionally acquired by men. Shivani shuts him down by talking about the true shades of what a woman has to go through. When Amit claims that just because of the female superintendent, murder cases are escalating drastically, Shivani answers with wit, which is watched live by Shekhawat and his daughter. Shekhawat realizes his mistake and mends his ways, agreeing to help Shivani. Shivani discovers that Sunny's next target is a politician, Sunanda. That night, amidst the Diwali celebrations, Shivani and her team search for Sunny. She discovers him in the house of a local couple, having taken their daughter and Sunanda hostage. Shivani is knocked unconscious and tied up.

When she wakes up, Sunny is strangling Sunanda; to distract him, Shivani talks about Sunny's mother and his past, which she learned from his father, who is imprisoned in Meerut. When Sunny was a child, his father had tried to murder his mother, who had been an outspoken woman. Out of fear, Sunny's mother tried hiding behind a terrace, but Sunny told his father where she was; his father then killed her. The guilt and trauma of his mother's death has since caused Sunny to become unhinged and take that anger out on other similarly strong, confident women by raping and murdering them. Shivani signals Sunanda and the other hostage to toss nearby buckets of paint onto Sunny, as he is asthmatic. She then gains the upper hand, beating Sunny with his own belt. She kicks him outside and continues beating him as the neighbourhood gathers to watch. Shivani then hands over the belt to Sunanda, who goes on beating Sunny. Right behind Shivani, the camera focuses on the Goddess Durga painting, highlighting the high contrary of the society.

=== Mardaani 3 (2026) ===
In Bulandshahr, Ruhani, the young daughter of Indian Ambassador Sahu, is abducted while playing hide-and-seek with Jhimli, the daughter of a domestic helper. When Jhimli attempts to intervene, she is abducted as well. Meanwhile, in the Sundarbans, SSP Shivani Shivaji Roy dismantles a women and drug trafficking operation. Impressed by her work, Sahu recommends Shivani to lead the investigation into Ruhani’s disappearance, while also announcing a public ransom of ₹2 crore.

The kidnappers initially hand the girls over to Amma, the powerful leader of a beggar mafia network, but later seize Ruhani back to extort the ransom directly. Despite Shivani overseeing the exchange, the criminals evade using a prerecorded video call to deceive the police. One gang member is captured and reveals links to Amma’s organization. Shivani discovers that 93 girls aged eight to nine from impoverished families have gone missing in three months, leading her to suspect that Ruhani was abducted after being mistaken for a poor child.

Following leads, the police track two of Amma’s enforcers to Treta Trust, a rehabilitation organization run by Ramanujan, who claims to work against beggar mafias. The enforcers are killed in an encounter while attempting to murder him. Soon after, Amma intimidates Shivani by intruding her home. A raid on Prince Lodge results in a shootout where the kidnappers are killed, and Ramanujan is sent to rescue Ruhani. He instead murders her, revealing himself as a mole within the police force working for Amma. Amma then threatens Shivani, who vows to rescue Jhimli.

Shivani is removed from the case by senior officials, but continues investigating unofficially. She finds one missing girl in a hospital, terminally ill with advanced cervical cancer, who dies shortly after revealing that several girls were nearly burned alive. Shivani links a symbol in the girl’s drawings to Treta Trust and uncovers Ramanujan’s past as a child abducted by Amma and raised within her network. Shivani arrests Ramanujan and Amma, but due to lack of evidence and manipulation by Ramanujan, he is released, Shivani is suspended, and a key witness dies in custody. Ramanujan, Amma, and accomplice Fatima flee to Colombo.

Shivani forms an independent team and pursues them overseas with Sahu’s support. It is revealed that the girls were abducted to be used as test subjects in illegal experiments involving a mutated HPV virus intended to accelerate cervical cancer drug trials. Girls deemed unsuitable were killed to avoid detection, explaining Ruhani’s murder. Shivani captures Amma and confronts Ramanujan in Colombo, revealing that Fatima was planted as an informant. Amma is killed during an escape attempt, and Ramanujan’s operation is thwarted. Shivani ensures the rescued girls are repatriated.

In the aftermath, Shivani injects Ramanujan with the same virus used on the victims, leaving him to die slowly under custody. She is reinstated into the police force, awarded the President’s Medal, and granted leadership of a special task force with operational autonomy. Jhimli is reunited with her father, and Sahu finds closure.

== Cast and characters ==
List indicator

This section includes characters who will appear or have appeared in more than two films in the series.

- An empty grey cell indicates the character was not in the film, or that the character's official presence has not yet been confirmed.

Characters	Films		
Characters	Mardaani (2014)	Mardaani 2 (2019)	Mardaani 3 (2026)
Shivani Shivaji Roy	Rani Mukerji	Rani Mukerji	Rani Mukerji
Dr. Bikram Roy	Jisshu Sengupta	Jisshu Sengupta	Jisshu Sengupta
Karan "Walt" Rastogi	Tahir Raj Bhasin		
Shiv "Sunny" Prasad Sharma		Vishal Jethwa	
Amma			Mallika Prasad
Fatima Anwar			Janki Bodiwala
Ramanujan			Prajesh Kashyap
Meera	Avneet Kaur	Avneet Kaur	
Inspector Balwinder Singh Sodhi	Mikhail Yawalkar		Mikhail Yawalkar
Jafar	Digvijay Rohidas		Digvijay Rohidas

== Crew ==
Occupation	Film		
Occupation	Mardaani	Mardaani 2	Mardaani 3
Director	Pradeep Sarkar	Gopi Puthran	Abhiraj Minawala
Writer(s)	Gopi Puthran	Gopi Puthran	Aayush Gupta; Deepak Kingrani; Baljeet Singh Marwah
Producer	Aditya Chopra	Aditya Chopra	Aditya Chopra
Cinematography	Artur Żurawski	Jishnu Bhattacharjee	Artur Żurawski
Editor	Sanjib Datta	Monisha Baldawa	Yasha Ramchandani
Composer(s)	Julius Packiam; Salim–Sulaiman	John Stewart Eduri	John Stewart Eduri; Sarthak Kalyani

== Release and reception ==
=== Box office performance ===
Film	Release date	Budget	Box office gross
Mardaani	22 August 2014	₹21 crore (US$2.2 million)	₹59.55 crore (US$6.2 million)
Mardaani 2	13 December 2019	₹27 crore (US$2.8 million)	₹67.12 crore (US$7.0 million)
Mardaani 3	30 January 2026	₹52 crore (US$5.4 million)	₹78.82 crore (US$8.2 million)
Total		₹100 crore (US$10 million)	₹205.49 crore (US$21 million)

=== Critical response ===
Film	Rotten Tomatoes
Mardaani	69% (5.7/10 average rating) (13 reviews)
Mardaani 2	50% (6.3/10 average rating) (14 reviews)
Mardaani 3	50% (6.4/10 average rating) (12 reviews)

== See also ==
- Cop Universe
- YRF Spy Universe
