= Artur Żurawski =

Polish cinematographer

- Born: 1972 (age 53–54); Szczecin, Poland
- Occupation: Cinematographer
- Years active: 1999–present

Artur Żurawski (born 1972) is a Polish cinematographer, director and photographer who works in Poland and internationally. A native of the Baltic port city of Szczecin, he is a graduate of the Academy of Visual Arts in Poznań and the National Film School in Łódź.

In 2014, he was the director of photography on the Indian crime thriller Mardaani, directed by Pradeep Sarkar, produced by Aditya Chopra, with Bollywood star Rani Mukerji in the leading role. In January 2015, the film premiered in the Polish capital, Warsaw, at one of Poland's oldest art houses, Kino Muranów, with Rani Mukerji and Artur Żurawski participating in a question-and-answer session after the screening.

== Filmography ==
- 2026 Mardaani 3
- 2017 Bhoomi
- 2016 Sultan
- 2014 Mardaani
- 2013 Jackpot
- 2011 Komisarz Rozen (TV Movie)
- 2010 Do dzwonka (TV Series)
- 2010 Nowa (TV Series)
- 2010 Gry i zabawy dzieciece (Documentary short)
- 2009 Od pelni do pelni
- 2009 Head to Love (Short)
- 2009 Tylko milosc (TV Series
- 2008 Skorumpowani
- 2007 Trzy po trzy. Numery z kwatery (TV Series)
- 2007 Dzieci piramidy (TV Movie documentary)
- 2006 Fabryka (TV Movie)
- 2006 Zgoda - Miejsce niezgody (TV Movie documentary)
- 2005 Osmy dzien teatru (Documentary short)
- 2005 Warto kochac (TV Series)
- 2005 W drodze (Documentary short)
- 2004 Powrót (Documentary short)
- 2004 Jestem (Short) (director of photography)
- 2003 Konkurs (Documentary short)
- 2003 Zycie przed toba (Documentary short)
- 2003 Ballada o lekkim zabarwieniu erotycznym (TV Mini-Series)
- 2002 Samo zycie (TV Series)
- 2002 U Danusi (Documentary)
- 2001 Mama, Look (Short)
- 2000 Sniezynka (Short)
- 2000 Rozkosze niedzielne (Short)
- 2000 Miedzy sasiadami - posrednik
