= Rono (musician) =

- Also known as: Ronit Sarkar
- Origin: Mumbai, India
- Occupations: Singer-songwriter; musician

Rono, formerly known as Awkward Bong, is the stage name of Ronit Sarkar, a Mumbai-based in the Indian indie music scene. He is the son of Pradeep Sarkar, a prominent Indian director and screenwriter, best known for his films such as Parineeta (2005) and Mardaani (2014).

== Career ==
Rono gained prominence with his indie hit "Main Aur Tum" and has since performed at major music festivals including Bacardi NH7 Weekender (Pune 2015) and Vans New Wave Festival (Bangalore 2015, Delhi 2016). In 2024, he embarked on The Gulaabi Rahi Tour, performing across cities like Pune, Delhi, Kolkata, Kochi, Bangalore, and Mumbai.

== Recognition ==
Rono's talent has garnered attention from various media outlets such as VH1 India's Music Diaries, Rolling Stone India, and IndiEarth. His work has been featured in Ennui.Bomb's "Stupiditties" indie compilations and utilized in advertising campaigns for brands like Tinder.

== Recent work ==
His recent projects include the EP Postcards and singles such as "All Afternoon", "Gulaabi Rahi" and "Aakhri Safar".

== Discography ==
Year	Album/Single	Song name	Ref.
2018	Single	"Yaadon Ka Bundergah"	
2018	Single	"Main Aur Tum"	
2021	EP	"Postcards"	
2021	Single	"Like a Love Song"	
2022	Single	"I Saw You in a Dream"	
2022	EP	"Sienna Tapes"	
2022	Single	"Lost & Lonely"	
2023	Single	"Raat"	
2023	Single	"All Afternoon"	
2024	Single	"Chali Aa"	
2024	Single	"Stranger"	
2024	Single	"Gulaabi Rahi"	
2025	Single	"Aakhri Safar"	
2025	EP	"Prequel"	
2025	Single	"Mehfooz Rakh"	
2025	Album	"Adhoore Se Khwaab"	
