= Screen Award for Best Actor in a Negative Role =

Annual film award in India

The Screen Award for Best Villain is chosen by a distinguished panel of judges from the Indian Bollywood film industry and the winners are announced in January. The award was further extended when they included a separate female category for performance in a villainous role. Though this was only given once in 1996. Frequent winners include Priyanka Chopra and Ronit Roy with 2 wins each.

== Multiple wins ==
Wins	Recipient
2	Priyanka Chopra, Ronit Roy

== Winners ==
Year	Winner	Film
1996	Mithun Chakraborty	Jallad
1997	Ashish Vidyarthi	Is Raat Ki Subah Nahin
1997	Rekha	Khiladiyon Ka Khiladi
1998	Mohan Joshi	Mrityudand
1999	Ashutosh Rana	Dushman
2000	Sayaji Shinde	Shool
2001	Rajpal Yadav	Jungle
2002	Manoj Bajpai	Aks
2003	Ajay Devgan	Deewangee
2004	-	-
2005	Priyanka Chopra	Aitraaz
2006	Nana Patekar	Apaharan
2007	Saif Ali Khan	Omkara
2008	Pankaj Kapoor	The Blue Umbrella
2009	Akshaye Khanna	Race
2010	Boman Irani	3 Idiots
2011	Ronit Roy	Udaan
2012	Prashant Narayanan	Murder 2
2012	Priyanka Chopra	7 Khoon Maaf
2013	Tigmanshu Dhulia	Gangs of Wasseypur
2014	Rishi Kapoor	D-Day
2014	Shilpa Shukla	B.A. Pass
2015	Huma Qureshi	Dedh Ishqiya
2015	Tahir Raj Bhasin	Mardaani
2016	Ronit Roy	Guddu Rangeela

== See also ==
- Screen Awards
- Bollywood
- Cinema of India
