= Bhaiyya Ji =

2024 Indian film by Apoorv Singh Karki

- Theatrical release poster
- Directed by: Apoorv Singh Karki
- Written by: Apoorv Singh Karki; Deepak Kingrani
- Produced by: Vinod Bhanushali; Kamlesh Bhanushali; Manoj Bajpayee; Shabana Raza; Shael Oswal; Samiksha Oswal
- Starring: Manoj Bajpayee; Zoya Hussain; Suvinder Vicky; Jatin Goswami
- Cinematography: Arjun Kukreti
- Edited by: Sumeet Kotian
- Music by: Songs: Manoj Tiwari; Deepak Thakur; Tulika Upadhyay; Score: Sandeep Chowta
- Production companies: Bhanushali Studios Limited; SSO Productions
- Distributed by: Pen Marudhar Entertainment
- Release date: 24 May 2024
- Running time: 131 minutes
- Country: India
- Language: Hindi
- Box office: est. ₹11.76 crore

Bhaiyaa Ji is a 2024 Indian Hindi-language action thriller film written by Apoorv Singh Karki, who co-wrote it with Deepak Kingrani. It stars Manoj Bajpayee in the titular role, reuniting with Karki after the legal drama Sirf Ek Bandaa Kaafi Hai (2023). It received mixed reviews from critics.

== Plot ==
Following the unfortunate death of his younger brother during a small argument, Bhaiyya Ji (Manoj Bajpayee), a retired and feared criminal, embarks on a quest for justice against the influential Gujjar who is responsible. He gathers his faithful associates and sparks a movement of revenge that poses a threat to the entire criminal world.

== Cast ==
- Manoj Bajpayee as Ram Charan Tripathi a.k.a. Bhaiyya Ji
  - Amrit Sachan as Young Bhaiyya Ji
- Bhageerathi Bai Kadam as Choti Ma (Bhaiyya Ji's step-mother)
- Zoya Hussain as Mithali
- Jatin Goswami as Abhimanyu Singh
- Suvinder Vicky as Chandrabhan Singh
- Vipin Sharma as SI Magan
- Abhishek Ranjan as Ravi
- Acharya Anant as Bhola
- Akash Makhija as Vedant
- Amrendra Sharma as Niyaz
- Jaihind Kumar as Pandit
- Nikhil Mehta as Bantu
- Veebhu Sharma as Bobby
- Sonal Devraj as dancer in item song

== Production ==
The film was announced in August 2023. Principal photography commenced on 19 September 2023.

This project is the second collaboration of Manoj Bajpayee and Apoorv Singh Karki after the Sirf Ek Bandaa Kaafi Hai movie.

=== Filming ===
The film was mainly shot in Uttar Pradesh.

=== Casting ===
Manoj Bajpayee plays the titular role while Zoya Hussain plays the lead female role. Suvinder Vicky plays the antagonist.

The official teaser was unveiled on 20 March 2024. The trailer of the movie was released on 9 May 2024.

== Release ==
=== Theatrical ===
The film was theatrically released on 24 May 2024.

=== Home media ===
The film was premiered on ZEE5 from 26 July 2024.

== Soundtrack ==
The music of the film is composed by Manoj Tiwari, Deepak Thakur and lyrics are written by Dr. Sagar . The first single titled "Baagh Ka Kareja" was released on 24 April 2024.The second single titled "Chakka Jaam" was released on 24 May 2024.

Track listing
No.	Title	Lyrics	Music	Singer(s)	Length
1.	Baagh Ka Kareja	Dr. Sagar	Aditya Dev	Manoj Tiwari	2:29
2.	Chakka Jaam	Dr. Sagar	Deepak Thakur	Malini Awasthi, Deepak Thakur	1:47

== Reception ==
Bhaiyya Ji received mixed reviews from critics.

News 18 rated it 3 out of 5 praising Manoj Bajpayee's performance. Jansatta too in its review commended Bajapyee and rated the film 3 out 5.

News 24 too put a watch rating on the movie, raving about Bajpayee's performance while also praising Zoya Hussain and Surendra Vicky. It wrote, "Manoj Bajpayee excels in this role, bringing realism to the character with his desi swag and fitting perfectly into the action scenes, despite being 55."

A critic for Bollywood Hungama rated the film 2.5 stars out of 5 and wrote "Bhaiyya Ji rests on a decent first half and Manoj Bajpayee’s massy performance, but the film fails to impress."

Many other reviewers were not as warm towards the film. On the review aggregator website Rotten Tomatoes, 0% of 5 critics' reviews are positive, with an average rating of 5/10.

Anuj Kumar of The Hindu stated "After spelling out the premise, the narrative takes a predictable shape." Shalini Langer of The Indian Express stated "There is a glimmer of hope that Karki is suggesting a Bihari sub-network that runs through cities such as Delhi that people like us see and not see – and that this could be Bhaiyya Ji’s biggest strength."

Deepa Gahlot of Rediff.com rated 2/5 stars and notes "A film with a one-line plot needed a lot more pizzazz, whistle-worthy dialogue and a large-than-life, invincible protagonist. Karki makes a Rajinikanth kind of actioner (Bhaiyya Ji fights with a bidi in his mouth) but with a realistic soul, and falls between two boats."

Taher Ahmed for Deccan Herald rated 2 stars and commented "The actors playing antagonists do hold their own. But the direction fails to impress, and the action scenes are run of the mill."

Abhimanyu Mathur for Daily News and Analysis praised Bajpayee's performance and stated "He is in Rajinikanth and Balakrishna territory here, playing an ageing but powerful hero. And the actor shows just why he is the most talented actor of his generation."

Amit Bhatia of ABP News opined "‘Bhaiyya Ji’ feels like a film that would have been remarkable 20 to 25 years ago. In today's era of realistic cinema, it comes across as dated."

Kartik Bhardwaj of Cinema Express gave 2 stars out of 5 to the movie and stated "Most of Bhaiyya Ji is all bark and no-bite."

Pragati Awasthi of WION also gave a negative review and wrote "Keep your brain in snooze mode while watching this, as you won’t need to use much of it. With everything illogical happening on screen, this type of movie requires a brain shutdown."

Nandini Ramnath of Scroll.in wrote "Bhaiyya Ji has several characters and scenes that similarly go nowhere."

== Box office ==
Released on 24 May 2024, Bhaiyya Ji collected a total of 11.76 crore at the worldwide box office.
