= Tahir Raj Bhasin =

Indian actor (born 1987)

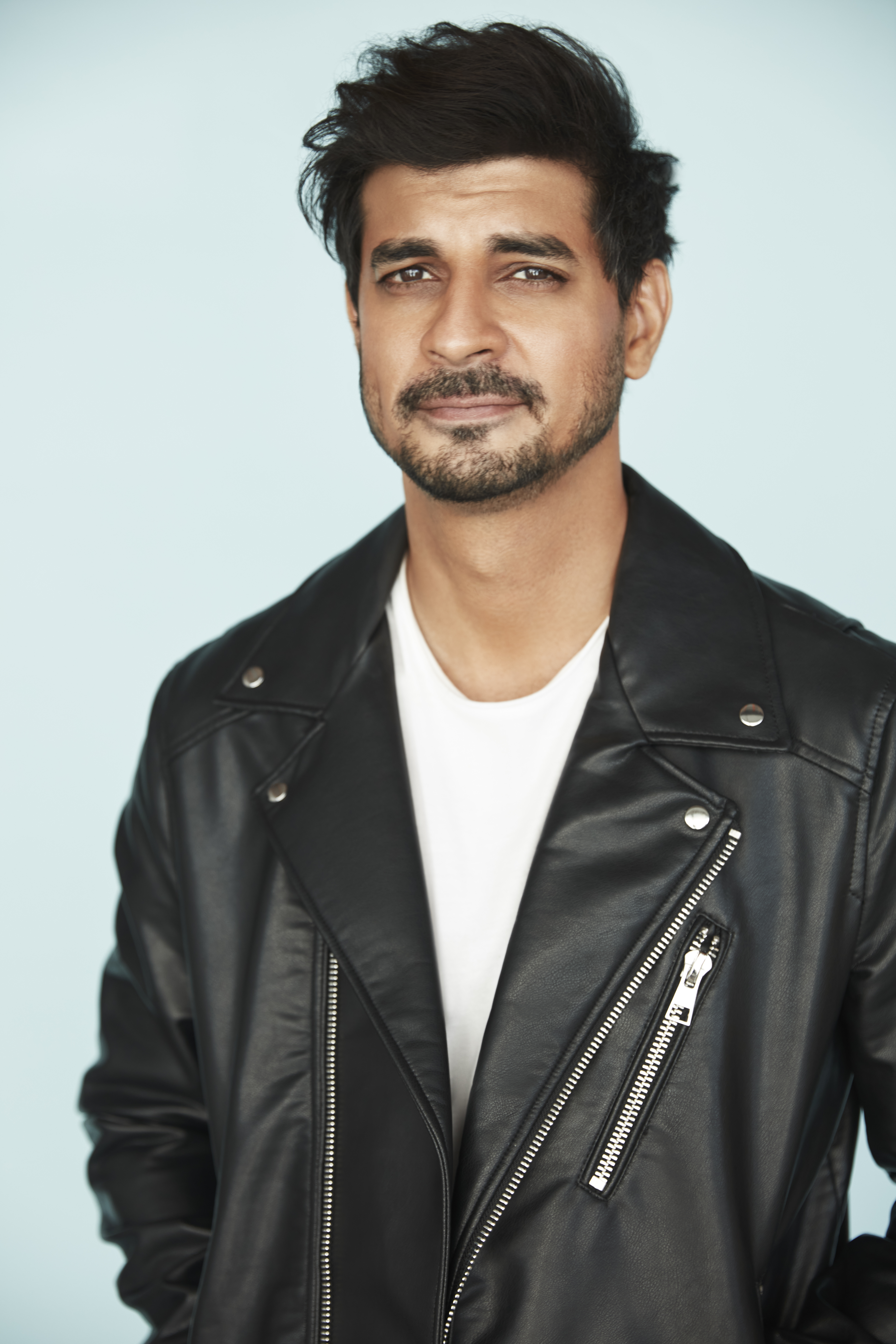
- Bhasin in 2021
- Born: 21 April 1987 (age 39); Delhi, India
- Occupations: Actor; model
- Years active: 2012–present

Tahir Raj Bhasin (born 21 April 1987) is an Indian actor who works in Hindi films. Bhasin made his screen debut with Kismat Love Paisa Dilli (2012) and made brief appearances in Kai Po Che! (2013) and One by Two (2014).

He made his official film debut with Mardaani (2014), which fetched him a Filmfare Award for Best Supporting Actor nomination and the Screen Award for Best Actor in a Negative Role. He also played the best antagonist in Force 2. His next film Chhichhore (2019) was a critical and commercial success. In 2021, he played cricketer Sunil Gavaskar in 83 (2021).

== Early life and work ==
Bhasin was born in New Delhi; his father worked in the Indian Air Force and he is the elder of two siblings. His mother worked for Confederation of Indian Industry and Aptech Computers. His younger brother is a pilot with Cathay Pacific. His father and grandfather both served as fighter pilots in the Indian Air Force. During his school days, he participated in many extra-curricular activities. He played basketball in school and did a lot of dance and theatre in college.

At the age of 13, Bhasin started acting and began his fundamental acting training at the age of 15 at the Barry John Acting School. He studied political science at Hindu College, University of Delhi and did a workshop with Aamir Raza Hussain, who is a theater personality in Delhi. It was when he participated in the IIT Bombay's Mood Indigo festival that he decided to become an actor. He holds a master's degree in media from the University of Melbourne, Australia with special papers in screen media and the history and philosophy of film. At the age of 18, he worked at a national news production company where he hosted a campus talk show for a news channel. Bhasin moved to Mumbai at the age of 23 to pursue acting and concentrate on modeling. He joined the Institute of Advanced Acting and Behavioural Studies for a year, where he learnt about body language and behavioral analytics. In 2013, he took part in the summer intensive acting and voice training program conducted by Naseeruddin Shah.

== Career ==
Tahir committed to acting professionally in 2012, when he featured in four short films for the Film and Television Institute of India and appeared in Indian television advertisements for companies like Samsung and Canon camera. That year, he was seen in a cameo appearance in the comedy thriller film Kismat Love Paisa Dilli, directed by Sanjay Khanduri. After starring in a seven-second role in Abhishek Kapoor's Kai Po Che! (2013), playing the role of senior Ali—the cricketer in the film—Tahir appeared in the romantic comedy One by Two (2014), directed by Devika Bhagat.

In 2014, Tahir made his debut in a leading role with Pradeep Sarkar's crime thriller Mardaani alongside Rani Mukerji, in which he played the role of Karan Rastogi, a Delhi-based human trafficking kingpin. His character in the film, inspired from the American TV series, Breaking Bad, was critically acclaimed and critics praised the representation of a "new, young, chilling face of crime" in Indian cinema. Mohar Basu of Koimoi called Bhasin a "revelation", and Taran Adarsh of Bollywood Hungama mentioned that Bhasin made sure he leaves an "ineradicable impression" even if "pitted against a powerhouse performer" like Mukerji. With the role, Bhasin topped "The Times hotlist'14" in the Best actor in a negative role category, and was nominated for Best Supporting Actor at the annual Filmfare Awards ceremony.

In 2016, Tahir starred in the action spy thriller Force 2 as the antagonist opposite John Abraham and Sonakshi Sinha. His acclaimed portrayal won him a Star screen nomination for best supporting actor.

For his work in Mardaani and Force 2, Tahir ranked in the Forbes magazine 30 under 30 list for 2017. The same year, he was ranked in The Times of India list of top 50 most desirable men.

Tahir walked the red carpet at the 2018 Cannes Film Festival as part of the cast for Nandita Das’s Manto, in which he portrays the 1940s Bollywood star Shyam.

In 2019, he portrayed one of the lead roles in Dangal director Nitesh Tiwari's feature film Chhichhore. The film became a blockbuster hit, grossing over 200 crores at the Indian box office and was awarded the prestigious National Award for best film.

In 2021 Tahir starred In Kabir Khan’s 83, a film about India’s first cricket World Cup victory in 1983. He has essayed the part of the legendary test cricketer Sunil Gavaskar.

In 2022 Tahir had three back-to-back releases: Ranjish Hi Sahi, Yeh Kaali Kaali Ankhein and Looop Lapeta, where he transitioned to playing the romantic lead.

The Netflix series Yeh Kaali Kaali Ankhein became a blockbuster hit and shot to number 1 on Netflix India. The Times of India said in its critique, "Tahir Raj Bhasin (who recently played Sunil Gavaskar in Kabir Khan's ‘83’) is delightful as a trapped Vikrant who is unable to escape. When he discovers that everything in his life is falling apart, including his true love, he makes the audience empathise and sympathise with his character's claustrophobic condition. Tahir's character arc is impressive, and he pulls it off like a pro."

KoiMoi stated in its review, “Tahir Raj Bhasin is literally everywhere. In theatres with 83, on Voot with Ranjish Hi Sahi, on Netflix with Yeh Kaali Kaali Ankhein and Looop Lapeta trailer. And he deserves to be there. The actor has the capability to handle an entire show on his back. As a character that see a 180-degree transformation, there are a lot of expectations from him, and he doesn’t disappoint. Watch out for the scenes he is helpless in, the man knows his craft and how!"

Miss Malini wrote, “Tahir is a revelation. He carries the nuances of Vikrant so effortlessly well and his journey from a small-town boy to a man-on-a-mission is a treat to watch."

He starred in the Netflix film Looop Lapeta opposite Taapsee Pannu, which soared to number 1 on Netflix India's charts and was ranked in the top non-English films worldwide. Tahir's performance as Satya opened to resounding critical acclaim. KoiMoi stated “This is a 2-balls-2-sixes situation for Tahir Raj Bhasin after proving his unerring mettle of acting skills in Yeh Kaali Kaali Aankhein. He underplays Satya big time without crossing the lines to be a caricature." A CNBC TV18 critique said, “Tahir Raj Bhasin is on a dream run right now. Already basking in adulation for his performances in web shows Ranjish Hi Sahi and Yeh Kaali Kaali Aankhein, he’s wild and nimble in Looop Lapeta as Satya." The film is the Indian adaptation of the hit German classic Run Lola Run.

== Personal life and off-screen work ==
In a 2015 interview, Bhasin stated that he had relationships during his school and college days but after being committed to acting, he does not have time for relationships. Bhasin walked for the ninth edition of the fashion show "Ramp For Champs" in 2015 and lent his support to the charity organisation Smile Foundation. The profits made from the event were used to educate girls.

In 2022, he was ranked 20th in GQ India's "30 most influential young Indians" list.

== Filmography ==
Key
†	Denotes films that have not yet been released

=== Films ===
Year	Title	Role	Notes	Ref.
2012	Kismat Love Paisa Dilli	Bamby		
2013	Kai Po Che!	Adult Ali Hashmi		
2014	One by Two	Mihir Deshpande		
2014	Mardaani	Karan "Walt" Rastogi		
2016	Force 2	Shiv Sharma / Rudra Pratap Singh		
2018	Manto	Shyam		
2019	Chhichhore	Derek D’Souza		
2021	83	Sunil Gavaskar		
2022	Looop Lapeta	Satyajeet "Satya"		
2025	Saale Aashiq	Shatru		
TBA	Calling Karan †	TBA	Filming	

=== Web series ===
Year	Title	Role	Notes	Ref.
2016	Love Shots	Nikhil	Episode: "The Road Trip"	
2018	Time Out	Rahul Trivedi		
2019	Pyaar Actually (Real is Rare)	Vivek	2 episodes	
2022	Ranjish Hi Sahi	Shankar Vats		
2022–present	Yeh Kaali Kaali Ankhein	Vikrant Singh Chauhan	2 seasons	
2023	Sultan of Delhi	Arjun Bhatia		
2025	Special Ops	Sudheer Awasthi	Season 2	
2026	Shaque: Trust No One	Alok Ditt		

== Awards and nominations ==
Year	Award	Category	Film	Result	Ref(s)
2014	Filmfare Awards	Best Supporting Actor	Mardaani	Nominated	
2014	Screen Awards	Best Actor In a Negative Role	Mardaani	Won	
2014	Screen Awards	Most Promising Newcomer (Male)	Mardaani	Nominated	
2014	Stardust Awards	Superstar of Tomorrow – Male	Mardaani	Nominated	
2014	Star Guild Awards	Best Performance in a Negative Role	Mardaani	Nominated	
2014	Star Guild Awards	Most Promising Debut – Male	Mardaani	Nominated	
