= Mardaani =

2014 Indian film by Pradeep Sarkar

- Theatrical release poster
- Directed by: Pradeep Sarkar
- Written by: Gopi Puthran
- Produced by: Aditya Chopra
- Starring: Rani Mukerji; Tahir Raj Bhasin; Jisshu Sengupta
- Cinematography: Artur Żurawski
- Edited by: Sanjib Datta
- Music by: Songs: Salim–Sulaiman; Score: Julius Packiam
- Production company: Yash Raj Films
- Distributed by: Yash Raj Films
- Release date: 22 August 2014
- Running time: 113 minutes
- Country: India
- Language: Hindi
- Budget: ₹21 crore
- Box office: ₹59.55 crore

Mardaani (transl. Manly) is a 2014 Indian Hindi-language action thriller film directed by Pradeep Sarkar and produced by Aditya Chopra under the banner of Yash Raj Films. The film stars Rani Mukerji in the lead role, with Jisshu Sengupta, Tahir Raj Bhasin, and Anant Vidhaat Sharma in supporting roles. It is the first instalment in the Mardaani Trilogy. The narrative follows Shivani Shivaji Roy, a policewoman whose interest in the case of a kidnapped teenage girl leads her to uncover the secrets of human trafficking by the Indian mafia.

The film was released on 22 August 2014 and received positive reviews from critics who praised the script and direction, emerging as a moderate success at the box-office. At the 60th Filmfare Awards, the film received five nominations, including Best Actress (Mukerji) and won Best Sound Design (Anilkumar Konakandla and Prabal Pradhan). A sequel titled Mardaani 2 was released in 2019. A third and final installment titled Mardaani 3 was released on 30 January 2026.

== Plot ==
The film opens with a covert police operation orchestrated by Shivani Shivaji Roy, a dedicated Crime Branch Senior Inspector of the Mumbai Police, in order to apprehend a pimp named Rahman from his hideout. She barges in with her team and arrests Rahman, and rescues his mistress. Shivani lives with her husband, Dr. Bikram Roy, and teenage niece, Meera. Prior to the events of the film, she rescued an orphaned girl named Pyaari from being sold by her uncle, and started looking after her like her own daughter. One day, Shivani finds out that Pyaari has been missing from her shelter home for five days and begins an investigation, where she finds out that the mastermind behind this kidnapping is a Delhi-based kingpin named Karan "Walt" Rastogi (Tahir Raj Bhasin), who runs a cartel involving child trafficking and drugs. Shivani takes the task personally, going beyond her job and duties to nab Karan.

Shivani forces Rahman to reveal the names of Karan's associates and comes across Sunny Katyal (Anant Vidhaat Sharma), a car dealer who operates Karan's trafficking business in Mumbai. Karan discovers that Shivani is monitoring his cartel's activities and tries to have Katyal killed for becoming a liability. However, Shivani saves Katyal, and he agrees to help her nab Karan. Determined to catch him, Shivani tracks down Karan's aide, Vakeel (ironically the Hindi word for "lawyer"). Karan, angered, makes sure that Pyaari is sold and raped every day. As a warning, he spreads fake news that Shivani's husband has misused his profession as a doctor to molest a female patient, causing Bikram to be fired. He then chops off one of Pyaari's fingers and sends it to Shivani's house as a gift.

Meanwhile, Karan's right-hand man Mattu (Aman Uppal) gets a contract to host a party full of prostitutes from a man named Tandon on behalf of a minister in Delhi, Taneja ji. Mattu also kills one of the girls in Karan's brothel at his orders when she contracts dengue, further frightening Pyaari.

Shivani travels to Delhi and sets up a trap involving decoy drug dealers from Nigeria, who pretend to offer expensive and rare South American cocaine to Karan and Vakeel. As they are negotiating, Shivani barges in with her team. While Karan escapes, Vakeel tries to erase evidence by destroying his mobile phone's SIM card, then commits suicide. Shivani and her Delhi-based teammate Balwinder Singh Sodhi track down a tailor who knew Vakeel for a long time. He reveals that a prostitute named Meenu Rastogi was Vakeel's closest associate. Shivani's continued investigation leads her to Karan's house, where Meenu, revealing herself to be Karan's mother, sedates her.

She is abducted and brought to Karan's party. There, Shivani reunites with Pyaari, as she and the other girls are forced to work as prostitutes. Karan invites Taneja ji and allows him to rape Shivani. However, she escapes and ruthlessly beats Taneja before taking him hostage. Shivani single-handedly takes control of the situation, forcing Karan into a small room and rescuing the girls. She challenges Karan to fight her when he teases her for being a woman and then thrashes him. Concerned that he might evade justice, given the corrupt police and judicial system of the country, she hands Karan over to the girls, who beat him to death. Subsequently, Sodhi and the entire team barge in and arrest Mattu, Tandon and Karan’s gang members. Meenu is also attacked by the girls and gets paralysed by shock while Taneja survives before being sentenced to life imprisonment.

== Cast ==
- Rani Mukerji as Senior Inspector Shivani Shivaji Roy, Mumbai Crime Branch
- Tahir Raj Bhasin as Karan "Walt" Rastogi, a Delhi-based human trafficking kingpin
- Jisshu Sengupta as Dr. Bikram Roy, Shivani's husband
- Anant Vidhaat Sharma as Sunny Katyal
- Mona Ambegaonkar as Meenu Rastogi, Walt's mother
- Anil George as Vakeel Saab, Walt's assistant
- Aman Uppal as Mattoo
- Mikhail Yawalkar as Sub Inspector Balwinder Singh Sodhi
- Priyanka Sharma as Pyaari
- Avneet Kaur as Meera, Shivani's niece
- Digvijay Rohidas Jafar
- Ashish Warang as More
- Sanjay Taneja as Taneja
- Gautam Babbar as Tandon
- Peter Muxka Manuel as Mboso
- Eddie Teal as Mbangwa
- Sharika Raina as Alka
- Rio Kapadia as JCP Sinha
- DV Vivek as JCP Iyer
- Saanand Verma as Kapil
- Mahika Sharma as a victim

== Production ==
Mukerji, who played the role of a crime branch officer in the film, met the Mumbai Police Crime Branch Chief as part of research for her role. It was speculated that her role was inspired by IPS officer Meera Borwankar, who was an investigation officer in the Mumbai 26/11 attacks. For her role, Mukerji trained in Krav Maga, a street-fighting, self-defence system developed for the Israeli military.

== Soundtrack ==
The film's soundtrack was composed by Salim-Sulaiman.

No.	Title	Lyrics	Singer(s)	Length
1.	"Mardaani Anthem"	Kausar Munir	Sunidhi Chauhan, Vijay Prakash	2:30

== Marketing and release ==
The official trailer was released on 24 June 2014. The Central Board of Film Certification required that the use of a profanity and scene depicting rape of a teenage girl be removed from the trailer. Because of the film's social message, the film was made tax free in Madhya Pradesh by Chief Minister Shivraj Singh Chouhan within the first week of its release. Later, Uttar Pradesh and Maharashtra made the film tax-free.

In Pakistan, Central Board of Film Censors gave the film adult Certificate but objected on few scenes. The Board asked for seven cuts and wanted certain scenes to be blurred, but the film makers were of the view that "it would lead to loss of the essence of the narration of the movie" and hence decided not to screen the movie in Pakistan.

Mardaani premiered at the Kino Muranów theatre in Warsaw, Poland on 29 January 2015, where it received a standing ovation.

== Reception ==
=== Critical response ===
On the review aggregator website Rotten Tomatoes, 69% of 13 critics' reviews are positive, with an average rating of 5.7/10.

Shakti Shetty of Mid-Day gave the film 4 out of 5 stars and wrote "Pradeep Sarkar offers a pragmatic and compelling story of what it is to chase down the bad guy with Rani Mukerji as an inspector who simply won't give up". Subhash K. Jha of SKJBollywoodNews gave 4 out of 5 stars, praising the film's soundtrack, writing "Mardaani cleans out the noises and yet retains a high decibel of authenticity in the complementary relationship between sight and sound". Taran Adarsh of Bollywood Hungama gave the film 3 out of 5 stars and wrote, "[E]nacting the part of the tough-talking cop who goes in pursuit of those who run the sex trafficking ring, Rani strikes a true to life, forceful pose and also lends her character the much-needed intensity, strength and dignity. The agony that drives her forward is visible on her face and is one of the prime reasons that makes this story easy to swallow". Rachit Gupta of Filmfare gave 3 out of 5 stars, writing "You can watch Mardaani for all the wrong reasons and feel underwhelmed. Don't watch it for Rani Mukerji trying to be a Salman Khan. She’s not". The Times of India gave 3.5/5 stars writing "While there is nothing in the plot that you haven't seen before, it is still watchable for the superb performance of Rani". Anupama Chopra of Hindustan Times gave 3 out of 5 stars, praising the cast performances but criticised the climax.

== Awards and nominations ==
Award	Category	Nominee	Result
Filmfare Awards	Best Actress	Rani Mukerji	Nominated
Filmfare Awards	Best Supporting Actor	Tahir Raj Bhasin	Nominated
Filmfare Awards	Best Sound Design	Anilkumar Konakandla and Prabal Pradhan	Won
Filmfare Awards	Best Screenplay	Gopi Puthran, S. Hussain Zaidi, Vibha Singh	Nominated
Filmfare Awards	Best Editing	Sanjib Dutta	Nominated
IIFA Awards	Best Actress	Rani Mukerji	Nominated
Screen Awards	Best Actress	Rani Mukerji	Nominated
Screen Awards	Best Villain	Tahir Raj Bhasin	Won
Star Guild Awards	Best Actress	Rani Mukerji	Nominated
Star Guild Awards	Best Villain	Tahir Raj Bhasin	Nominated
Stardust Awards	Best Thriller – Action Actress	Rani Mukerji	Won
BIG Star Entertainment Awards	Most Entertaining Film Actor – Female	Rani Mukerji	Nominated
BIG Star Entertainment Awards	Most Entertaining Actress in a Social Role	Rani Mukerji	Nominated
BIG Star Entertainment Awards	Most Entertaining Actor in a Thriller Role	Rani Mukerji	Nominated

== Prequel ==
A prequel titled Mardaani 2 directed by Gopi Puthran was released on 13 December 2019.
