= Aditya Chopra =

Indian filmmaker (born 1971)

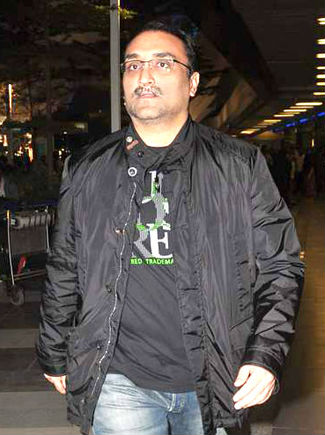
- Chopra in 2012
- Born: 21 May 1971 (age 55); Bombay, Maharashtra, India
- Education: University of Mumbai
- Occupations: Film director; Producer; Screenwriter; Studio executive
- Years active: 1988–present
- Board member of: Tata Strategic Management (2012–present)
- Spouses: Payal Khanna (m. 2001; div. 2009); Rani Mukerji (m. 2014)
- Children: 1
- Parents: Yash Chopra; Pamela Chopra
- Family: Chopra; Mukerji

Aditya Chopra (born 21 May 1971) is an Indian film director, producer, and studio executive who works in Hindi Cinema. He is the Chairman of India's multi-national film, media, and entertainment conglomerate Yash Raj Films (YRF). The films he has produced make him the highest grossing Indian film producer of all time.

Having denied Chopra admission into the National School of Drama due to his severe stammering as a young applicant, the Film Division of India eventually honored him with the National Award for his achievements in 1995, 2004, 2007 and 2015. Widely regarded as the most influential executive in Indian entertainment, Chopra has however rejected the publicity and fame that came with being Yash Chopra's son and the chief executive of Yash Raj Films.

== Early life ==
Chopra, the elder son of late filmmaker Yash Chopra and Pamela Chopra, was born on 21 May 1971. His only sibling is actor and producer, Uday Chopra. He is the nephew of film producers B.R. Chopra and Yash Johar, and the cousin of filmmakers Ravi Chopra and Karan Johar. He completed his secondary education at Bombay Scottish School, earning his Indian Certificate of Secondary Education. He graduated from Sydenham College of Commerce and Economics, along with Anil Thadani, Karan Johar, and Abhishek Kapoor.

== Filmmaking career ==
Chopra started his film-making career at the age of 18 as an assistant director, working with his father on films such as Chandni (1989), Lamhe (1991) and Darr (1993). He also wrote his first screenplays for his father's Parampara (1992) and his mother's independently produced film Aaina (1993), which was the only film not directed by his father that he was an assistant director on.

=== 1995: Directorial debut and success ===
Chopra, after gaining a respectable amount of experience, started independently at the age of 23 with the all-time blockbuster romantic comedy-drama Dilwale Dulhaniya Le Jayenge (1995), with Shah Rukh Khan and Kajol, for which he was the director and writer. The film was scripted by Chopra and produced by his father Yash Chopra, under the YRF banner. Chopra started work on the script of the film in 1990, at the age of 19, and gradually spent time making about five drafts of the film's original script. Chopra even managed to convince his brother Uday Chopra and Karan Johar, both aspiring filmmakers, to enter the film industry as assistant directors with the film. Chopra once said that the presence of his relatives during the making of the film worked as a huge emotional support. Dilwale Dulhaniya Le Jayenge eventually went on to become one of the biggest hits of all time and won the National Film Award for Best Popular Film Providing Wholesome Entertainment and the Filmfare Award for Best Film, in addition to the Filmfare Award for Best Director for Chopra.

=== 1996–2002: Extensive work in Yash Raj Films ===
Chopra eventually went on to write the dialogues and the story of his father's 1997 musical romance Dil To Pagal Hai, (which won the National Film Award for Best Popular Film Providing Wholesome Entertainment), also made under YRF. His next film as a director was the musical romantic drama Mohabbatein (2000) starring Amitabh Bachchan, Shahrukh Khan and Aishwarya Rai, and also launched his brother Uday Chopra into the film industry. The film was also written and co-produced by Chopra and emerged as the highest-grossing film of the year, earning Chopra his second nomination for the Filmfare Award for Best Director. The next film under the banner was the romantic comedy Mere Yaar Ki Shaadi Hai (2002), which released in June 2002, starring his brother Uday alongside Tulip Joshi, Bipasha Basu and Jimmy Sheirgill. The film did moderately well at the box office. The studio's final release that year was the romantic drama Saathiya, a remake of the Tamil film Alai Payuthey, which starred Vivek Oberoi opposite Rani Mukerji. The film proved to be a major hit at the box office.

=== 2004: Breakthrough in production ===
In 2004, Chopra produced the romantic comedy Hum Tum, the action thriller Dhoom and the epic love saga Veer-Zaara (for which he was also the screenwriter) under the YRF banner. All three films went on to become major critical and commercial successes, earning more than ₹200 crore (US$21 million) (unadjusted for inflation) in the worldwide market. The films became the sixth, third and highest-grossing Indian films of 2004. The company won most of the Indian film awards in the year, with Veer-Zaara also winning the National Film Award for Best Popular Film Providing Wholesome Entertainment.

Chopra then produced and wrote several other highly critically and commercial successful films over the years, namely Bunty Aur Babli, Salaam Namaste, Fanaa, Dhoom 2 and Chak De India (which also won the National Film Award for Best Popular Film Providing Wholesome Entertainment).

Chopra also made his third film as a director in 2008 with the romantic comedy Rab Ne Bana Di Jodi starring Shahrukh Khan and launching newcomer Anushka Sharma. The film received mixed reviews upon release, but emerged as one of the highest-grossing films for Khan and YRF at that time, earning ₹172 crore (US$18 million) in the worldwide market. The film earned Chopra his third nomination for the Filmfare Award for Best Director.

YRF launched a number of budding screenwriters and directors under their banner throughout these years. Directors and screenwriters such as Karan Johar (his Kuch Kuch Hota Hai was co-produced and released by Yash Raj Film Distributors), Kunal Kohli, Kabir Khan, Sanjay Gadhvi, Jaideep Sahni, Siddharth Anand, Shimit Amin, Habib Faisal, Shaad Ali, Maneesh Sharma and Vijay Acharya debuted under YRF and have gone on to become independent entities in films. The company also produced films for filmmakers such as Anil Mehta and Pradeep Sarkar under their banner. The company was eventually ranked at Number 1 (among the most successful film production companies in India) in a survey conducted by Filmfare and at number 27 (among the most successful film production companies in the world) in a survey by The Hollywood Reporter, both under the vice-chairmanship of Chopra.

=== Return to film direction: Befikre (2016) ===
In September 2015, YRF announced Chopra's directorial comeback with the romantic comedy Befikre, scheduled for a December 2016 release. In October 2015, it was announced that Ranveer Singh and Vaani Kapoor were cast in the lead roles. In December 2015, YRF announced that the music of the film will be produced by Vishal–Shekhar and Jaideep Sahni, both of whom would return to collaborate with YRF after roughly 9 years. The film marked Chopra's directorial comeback 8 years after Rab Ne Bana Di Jodi (2008). A theatrical trailer of the film was released at the Eiffel Tower and across social media platforms in the month of October. The film was budgeted at ₹70 crore (US$7.5 million) (including print and advertising costs) and released across 2900 screens worldwide on 9 December 2016. It opened to widespread negative reviews across platforms and faced heavy losses to its business because of the currency demonetisation implied by the Government of India a few days prior to its release. The film managed to gross ₹63 crore (US$6.7 million) after a two-week theatrical run at the global box office, failing to manage break-even business for YRF.

== Career as studio executive ==
In 2004, Chopra started producing under the YRF banner. He produced Hum Tum, Dhoom and Veer-Zaara (for which he was also the screenwriter), all three films went on to become critical and commercial blockbusters, earning more than ₹200 crore (US$21 million) (unadjusted for inflation) in the worldwide market. The films became the sixth, third and highest-grossing Indian films of 2004. The company won most of the Indian film awards in the year, with Veer-Zaara also winning the National Film Award for Best Popular Film Providing Wholesome Entertainment.

The company saw an all-time low, with several of their high-budgeted films not doing well at the box office, despite favourable critical reviews and the company thereby suffering losses amounting to millions from 2007 to 2010. The films broke YRF's perfect success ratio and were oddly released one after another. Some of the most unsuccessful films produced under the banner were Jhoom Barabar Jhoom, Laaga Chunari Mein Daag, Tashan, Thoda Pyaar Thoda Magic, Roadside Romeo, and Pyaar Impossible. Chopra then took over as the Vice Chairman of Yash Raj Films in 2010, soon after the release of the film Badmaash Company under the same banner.

Chopra has produced several commercially viable projects including off-beat content not necessarily fitting into the realm of "masala films". Chopra is the first to move towards the film studio model through independent projects helmed by talent under his banner. Major post-production work of the company is completed at YRF Studios (co-founded by his ex-wife Payal Khanna), where Chopra is chief executive. The Government of India appealed both Chopra and Mani Ratnam to focus on content created locally under its Make in India and Atmanirbhar Bharat initiatives. In June 2018, he was awarded membership into the Academy of Motion Picture Arts and Sciences by the Producers Guild of America. Apart from emerging as an equitable brand, his company earned the status of a movie mogul through distribution networks spread across the globe.

== Legal issues and controversies ==
=== Ghajini ===
Photographers of the Indian media caught a glimpse of the extremely-reclusive Chopra on 27 December 2008. Chopra's Rab Ne Bana Di Jodi and Aamir Khan's Ghajini were the two big Indian releases of the year 2008 and were pitted against each other by the press; Rab Ne Bana Di Jodi was to release on Diwali and Ghajini was to release on Christmas, with a gap of a few weeks between them. Chopra was present at a private screening of Ghajini that was held by Khan, for members of the film industry. Chopra was seen leaving through the back entrance of the theatre premise around 2 am, just before the end credits of the film. On spotting multiple journalists outside the venue, he reportedly panicked and desperately sprinted towards his car to avoid being photographed. Chopra pulled down the sun visor of his car and drove away.

=== Failed acquisition of Yash Raj Films by Walt Disney ===
The Walt Disney Company entered India in 2007 through a co-production agreement (Ta Ra Rum Pum, Thoda Pyaar Thoda Magic, and Roadside Romeo) with YRF. Disney's move was seen as a bid to increase its global presence and enter Indian entertainment. This was followed by Warner Bros., Columbia Pictures, Universal Pictures, and 20th Century Fox, who made similar moves.

Post the release of the three films, Disney attempted a ₹5,000 crore (US$530 million) hostile takeover of YRF in December 2009. The offer was pushed after its acquisitions of Pixar and Marvel from the previous year. YRF however fought the offer and continued as a domestic entity, heavily aided by the Tata Sons. This was followed by the exits of Dick Cook from Walt Disney and Sanjeev Kohli from YRF. In June 2011, Disney acquired UTV at ₹2,000 crore (US$210 million) to establish Disney-UTV. Records from the Registrar of Companies of the same year showed that YRF received investments from LIC of India, Catamaran Ventures, and Maruti-Udyog.

In December 2016, Disney-UTV announced a temporary closure of its offices. After the release of its final film in July 2017, Disney exited all film operations in India and was permanently liquidated. In January 2019, YRF reached a ₹19,000 crore (US$2.0 billion) valuation by SEBI, thereby making it the largest Indian film production company of all time.

=== Failed acquisition of B.R. Films by 20th Century Fox ===
In 2010, 20th Century Fox launched its Indian operations and partnered with B.R. Films to co-produce its first project titled Banda Yeh Bindaas Hai. However, a few months into production, the film was permanently stalled due to creative and scheduling conflicts amongst the makers. This delay led to a lawsuit filed by Fox against B.R. Films and Ravi Chopra claiming breach of contract and severe financial damages. In its appeal, Fox demanded the transfer of licensing rights of the entire B.R. Films catalogue, including the television series Mahabharat, along with a monetary compensation of ₹32 crore (US$3.4 million). In July 2012, the Sessions Court of Mumbai ordered B.R. Films to remit the demanded assets to avoid foreclosure of its studio and family residence in Juhu, Mumbai.

In April 2013, Aditya Chopra submitted a promissory note to the sitting bench of the Bombay High Court against the ₹32 crore (US$3.4 million) loan; the letter guaranteed full repayment of the loan and was co-signed by Arundhati Bhattacharya and N. Chandrasekaran. The loan was settled in July of the same year and all licensing rights were transferred back to B.R. Films. Ravi Chopra did not produce any film post this settlement till his demise in November 2014. In 2016, 20th Century Fox announced a complete shut down of its Indian operations, leading to the exits of Vijay Singh (from Fox Star Studios) and Emma Watts (from 20th Century Studios).

In 2017, B.R. Films went into production of three independent projects titled Bareilly Ki Barfi, Ittefaq, and Pati Patni Aur Woh. Produced at ₹95 crore (US$10 million), the films collectively grossed more than ₹240 crore (US$26 million) at the global box office. All three films were distributed by YRF Distributors at 0% commission with Ittefaq becoming the first (and only) remake of a YRF project.

=== Son of Sardaar ===
In 2012, Ajay Devgan, Viacom 18 Motion Pictures and Eros International together moved the Competition Commission of India against Yash Raj Films and Aditya Chopra, accusing the company of using monopolistic business practices and rampantly abusing their dominant position and clout in the Entertainment Industry of India by entering into a tie-in arrangement with 1,500 single screen film exhibitors (out of a total of 2,100) of India, that obliged them to showcase the company's Jab Tak Hai Jaan (and not Son of Sardaar) on the Diwali week of 2012 and continue its theatrical run for two weeks after the worldwide release. The trio eventually moved the Competition Appellate Tribunal on 30 October 2012 against YRF but were turned down by the bench heading the Tribunal.

Both films opened on 13 November 2012; Jab Tak Hai Jaan released on 3500 screens and Son of Sardar released on 2000 screens, in the worldwide market. However, in November 2013, the CCI dismissed the case filing as they found YRF to not be in contravention of the Competition Act of India; YRF won the case.

=== Raees ===
Raees (2017) was a film produced by Excel Entertainment and Red Chillies Entertainment helmed by Rahul Dholakia. Principal photography of the film was completed in April 2015 and a few months were allotted to its post-production work. A teaser/trailer of the film was released across social media platforms and attached to Bajrangi Bhaijaan on 17 July 2015 announcing it as a 5 July 2016 release; packaged and presented as an Eid project. However, sensing an opportunity in the same period, YRF went ahead to green-light its own Sultan, slated for release on the same day, in January 2016. Principal photography with Salman Khan and Anushka Sharma was completed in 3 months followed by post-production work being completed in May. A teaser/trailer and other marketing material featuring both Khan and Sharma were released simultaneously starting in April across platforms and networks. The film was ready for a 5 July release and as a result, around 4230 theatre screens available in India would have been divided among the two films.

Realising a loss in business to both films, Ritesh Sidhwani and Shah Rukh Khan, the producers of Raees approached Chopra to work out a settlement to ensure both projects are exhibited comfortably across centres. However, Chopra disagreed to shift his release date stating the poor performance of Khan's prior releases (Dilwale and Fan) in the global box office. Moreover, Chopra ensured that YRF Distributors (his film distribution leg) exhibit Sultan to more than 3100 screens (out of the total 4230), apparently abusing his dominant position and clout in the Entertainment Industry of India, an allegation that he has battled several times in the past.

Sultan eventually released on 6 July 2016, as planned by YRF, across 4310 Indian screens and 1130 screens internationally, to gross ₹501 crore (US$54 million) in the worldwide market and Raees was postponed to 26 January 2017, scheduled to release alongside Kaabil on the same day.

=== Paani ===
In November 2012, YRF green-lit their first Indian-American war drama co-production titled Paani with DreamWorks Pictures. The film was to be helmed by Shekhar Kapur and Sushant Singh Rajput was signed for the lead role in December of the same year. Principal photography was to start in June 2013, and it was planned as a December 2015 release by both Chopra and Kapur. A. R. Rahman was roped in to score the music of the film and pre-production work started in January 2013 with the entire cast and crew at YRF Studios.

In February 2013, Sanjay Leela Bhansali offered the lead role to Rajput in his Shakespearean tragic romance Ram-Leela, which was scheduled to be shot throughout the year 2013. Chopra, however, advised Rajput to turn down the role to focus solely on Paani and led Bhansali to sign Ranveer Singh (through YRF Talent) instead. In November 2013, Chopra shelved Paani stating affordability issues faced by YRF during pre-production work. Ram-Leela meanwhile opened to overwhelming critical and box office success in the same period with both Bhansali and Singh being awarded extensively for their work.

Rajput was later signed for another independent YRF projects; Detective Byomkesh Bakshy scheduled to release in April 2015, which was a box-office bomb.

=== Pathaan ===
On 12 December 2022, YRF released a song from the fourth project of its spy universe titled "Besharam Rang" across all media platforms. Picturised on Deepika Padukone and Shah Rukh Khan in the outskirts of Benicàssim, the song was written by Vishal–Shekhar and Kumaar. Choreography and direction was by Vaibhavi Merchant. A few days after release of the song, it started gaining criticism among right-wing ideologists for its lyrics, Padukone's appearance in a saffron bikini, and Khan's appearance in green trousers. A boycott call on Twitter by the name "#BoycottPathaan" began to trend with a section of users calling the visuals "vulgar" and "infuriating".

Chopra wrote to the Office of the Prime Minister explaining this issue a week before the release of the film. On 18 January 2023, the Prime Minister of India sent out a warning to the workers of all national political parties to "strictly refrain from making comments on films". It was the first-ever public statement strategically released by the PMO to safeguard the release of a film in India. The Ministry for Information and Broadcasting further cautioned political leaders and workers against making remarks on important films. Followingly, the state governments of Gujarat, Uttar Pradesh, Madhya Pradesh, and Assam assured YRF protection for its viewers and assurance that protestors will be strictly prosecuted. On 24 January 2023, a day before the release of the film, the Vishva Hindu Parishad released a statement to its members that they were "satisfied" with the certification of the film and assured that all protests will be ceased.

At the time of the statement, Pathaan was slated to be screened in 5500+ movie theatres in India and 2500+ movie theatres in more than 100 countries internationally thereby making it the most widely released Indian film. After two days of its release, 25 additional screens were added after the Chief Justice of Delhi High Court directed Chopra to add an exclusive version of the film for people with disabilities.

On 3 March 2023, Pathaan emerged as the third highest grossing Hindi film of all time.

== Personal life ==
He was married to Payal Khanna until their divorce in 2009. The couple had no children. On 21 April 2014, he married actress Rani Mukerji in a private ceremony in Italy. In December 2015, Rani gave birth to their daughter Adira Chopra.

In 2023, Chopra sat down for an extensive interview for the first time in 28 years for the Netflix series The Romantics, which highlights the rise of Yash Chopra and Yash Raj Films.

== Filmography ==
=== Film ===
Year	Film	Credited as			Notes
Year	Film	Director	Producer	Writer	Notes
1989	Chandni	Assistant	No	No	
1991	Lamhe	Assistant	No	No	
1993	Parampara	No	Associate	Screenplay	
1993	Aaina	Assistant	No	No	
1993	Darr	Associate	No	No	
1995	Dilwale Dulhania Le Jayenge	Yes	No	Yes	
1997	Dil To Pagal Hai	No	Associate	Dialogue	
2000	Mohabbatein	Yes	Associate	Yes	
2002	Mere Yaar Ki Shaadi Hai	No	Associate	No	
2002	Mujhse Dosti Karoge!	No	Associate	Story	
2004	Hum Tum	No	Yes	No	
2004	Dhoom	No	Yes	Story	
2004	Veer-Zaara	No	Yes	Yes	
2005	Bunty Aur Babli	No	Yes	Story	
2005	Salaam Namaste	No	Yes	No	
2005	Neal 'N' Nikki	No	Yes	No	
2006	Fanaa	No	Yes	No	
2006	Dhoom 2	No	Yes	Story	
2006	Kabul Express	No	Yes	No	
2007	Ta Ra Rum Pum	No	Yes	No	
2007	Jhoom Barabar Jhoom	No	Yes	No	
2007	Chak De! India	No	Yes	No	
2007	Laaga Chunari Mein Daag	No	Yes	No	
2007	Aaja Nachle	No	Yes	Story	
2008	Tashan	No	Yes	No	
2008	Thoda Pyaar Thoda Magic	No	Yes	No	
2008	Bachna Ae Haseeno	No	Yes	Story	
2008	Roadside Romeo	No	Yes	No	
2008	Rab Ne Bana Di Jodi	Yes	Yes	Yes	
2009	New York	No	Yes	Story	
2009	Dil Bole Hadippa!	No	Yes	No	
2009	Rocket Singh: Salesman of the Year	No	Yes	No	
2010	Badmaash Company	No	Yes	No	
2010	Lafangey Parindey	No	Yes	No	
2010	Band Baaja Baaraat	No	Yes	No	
2011	Luv Ka The End	No	Presenter	No	
2011	Mere Brother Ki Dulhan	No	Yes	No	
2011	Mujhse Fraaandship Karoge	No	Presenter	No	
2011	Ladies vs Ricky Bahl	No	Yes	Story	
2012	Ishaqzaade	No	Yes	Story	
2012	Ek Tha Tiger	No	Yes	Story	
2012	Jab Tak Hai Jaan	No	Yes	Yes	
2013	Mere Dad Ki Maruti	No	Presenter	No	
2013	Aurangzeb	No	Yes	No	
2013	Shuddh Desi Romance	No	Yes	No	
2013	Dhoom 3	No	Yes	Story	
2014	Gunday	No	Yes	No	
2014	Aaha Kalyanam	No	Yes	No	Tamil film
2014	Bewakoofiyaan	No	Yes	No	
2014	Mardaani	No	Yes	No	
2014	Daawat-e-Ishq	No	Yes	No	
2014	Kill Dil	No	Yes	No	
2015	Dum Laga Ke Haisha	No	Presenter	No	
2015	Detective Byomkesh Bakshy!	No	Yes	No	Co-produced with Dibakar Banerjee
2015	Titli	No	Yes	No	Co-produced with Dibakar Banerjee
2016	Fan	No	Yes	No	
2016	Sultan	No	Yes	No	
2016	Befikre	Yes	Yes	Yes	
2017-	Meri Pyaari Bindu	No	Presenter	No	
2017-	Bank Chor	No	Presenter	No	
2017-	Qaidi Band	No	Yes	No	
2017-	Tiger Zinda Hai	No	Yes	Story	
2018	Hichki	No	Presenter	No	
2018	Sui-Dhaaga	No	Presenter	No	
2018	Thugs of Hindostan	No	Yes	No	
2019	War	No	Yes	Story	
2019	Mardaani 2	No	Yes	No	
2021	Bunty Aur Babli 2	No	Yes	Story	
2022	Jayeshbhai Jordaar	No	Presenter	No	
2022	Samrat Prithviraj	No	Yes	No	
2022	Shamshera	No	Yes	No	
2023	Pathaan	No	Yes	No	
2023	The Great Indian Family	No	Yes	No	
2023	Tiger 3	No	Yes	Story	
2024	Maharaj	No	Yes	No	
2025	Saiyaara	No	Presenter	No	
2025	War 2	No	Yes	Story	
2026	Mardaani 3	No	Yes	No	
2026	Alpha	No	Yes	No	
2027	Sameer Saxena's next	No	Presenter	No	
2027	Ali Abbas Zafar's next	No	Yes	No	
2028	Abhay Pannu's next	No	Presenter	No	
2028	Maneesh Sharma's next	No	Yes	No	
2028	Mohit Suri's next	No	Presenter	No	

=== Television ===
Year	Title	Producer	Executive Producer	Distribution	Notes	Ref.
2010	Seven	Yes	No	Sony	9 Episodes	
2010	Lift Kara De	Yes	No	Sony	28 Episodes	
2010	Powder	Yes	No	Sony	28 Episodes	
2010	Mahi Way	Yes	No	Sony	24 Episodes	
2010	Rishta.com	Yes	No	Sony	26 Episodes	
2011	Khotey Sikkey	Yes	No	Sony	25 Episodes	
2011	Kismat	Yes	No	Sony	25 Episodes	
2023	The Romantics	No	Yes	Netflix	4 Episodes	
2023	The Railway Men	No	Yes	Netflix	4 Episodes	
2023	Vijay 69	No	Yes	Netflix	Feature film	
2025	Mandala Murders	No	Yes	Netflix	8 Episodes	
2025	Akka	No	Yes	Netflix	—N/a	

=== Stage ===
Title	Opening	Curtains	Premiere	Ref.
Come Fall In Love - The Musical	14 September 2022	13 October 2022	Old Globe, San Diego	
Come Fall In Love - The Musical	14 October 2022	13 November 2022	Broadway, New York	
Come Fall In Love - The Musical	29 May 2025	21 June 2025	Opera House, Manchester	
Come Fall In Love - The Musical	22 June 2025	27 July 2025	West End, London	
Come Fall In Love - The Musical	29 June 2027	21 July 2027	National School of Drama, Delhi	
Come Fall In Love - The Musical	22 July 2027	27 August 2027	Prithvi, Mumbai	

== See also ==
- List of Hindi film clans
- List of highest-grossing Bollywood films
- The Romantics (documentary) (2023)
