= Deepak Kingrani =

Indian screenwriter

- Occupation: Screenwriter
- Years active: 2013–present

Deepak Kingrani is an Indian screenwriter who works in Hindi films. He is best known as the writer of the espionage thriller series Special Ops.

== Career ==
After leaving his job in the IT sector, he moved to Mumbai to become a screenwriter. His first film as a screenwriter was the comedy War Chhod Na Yaar (2013), which he wrote the dialogues. His breakthrough came when he wrote the espionage thriller Special Ops (2020) along with Neeraj Pandey streaming on Hotstar.

== Filmography ==
=== Film ===
Year	Title	Story	Screenplay	Dialogue	Notes
2013	War Chhod Na Yaar	No	No	Yes	
2019	Pagalpanti	No	No	Yes	
2023	Sirf Ek Bandaa Kaafi Hai	Yes	Yes	Yes	
2023	Mission Raniganj	Yes	No	Yes	
2024	Bhaiyya Ji	No	Yes	Yes	
2026	Mardaani 3	Yes	No	No	

=== Web series ===
Year	Title	Story	Screenplay	Dialogues	Notes
2020	Special Ops	Yes	Yes	Yes	

== Awards and nominations ==
Year	Title	Award	Category	Result	Notes
2022	Special Ops 1.5: The Himmat Story	IWM Digital Awards	Best Story In A Web Series	Won	
2023	Sirf Ek Bandaa Kaafi Hai	Filmfare OTT Awards	Best Dialogue (Web Original Film)	Won	
2023	Sirf Ek Bandaa Kaafi Hai	Filmfare OTT Awards	Best Story (Web Original Film)	Won	
2023	Sirf Ek Bandaa Kaafi Hai	71st National Film Awards	Best Dialogue	Won	
