= Mardaani 2 =

2019 Indian film by Gopi Puthran

- Theatrical release poster
- Directed by: Gopi Puthran
- Written by: Gopi Puthran
- Produced by: Aditya Chopra
- Starring: Rani Mukerji; Vishal Jethwa
- Cinematography: Jishnu Bhattacharjee
- Edited by: Monisha Baldawa
- Music by: John Stewart Eduri
- Production company: Yash Raj Films
- Distributed by: Yash Raj Films
- Release date: 13 December 2019
- Running time: 103 minutes
- Country: India
- Language: Hindi
- Budget: ₹27 crore
- Box office: ₹67.12 crore

Mardaani 2 (transl. Manly 2) is a 2019 Indian Hindi-language action-thriller film written and directed by Gopi Puthran. It is produced by Aditya Chopra under Yash Raj Films. A sequel to the 2014 film Mardaani and the second instalment in the Mardaani film series, it stars Rani Mukerji in the lead role and Vishal Jethwa in an important role. The narrative follows police officer Shivani Shivaji Roy's attempts to catch a 21-year-old rapist and murderer.

Mardaani 2 was theatrically released on 13 December 2019 and received positive reviews from critics, with praise towards its screenplay, direction and Jethwa's performance but criticism for its pacing. The film was a moderate success at the box office, grossing ₹67.12 crore (US$7.0 million) worldwide. A sequel titled Mardaani 3 was released on 30 January 2026.

== Plot ==
In Kota, Rajasthan, an active serial rapist and killer is targeting women. The killer is 21-year-old Sunny (Vishal Jethwa), an egotistical male chauvinist who rapes and murders women whom he believes have acted beyond what he considers their inferior social status or have wounded his ego. One day, Sunny sees an outspoken young woman named Latika arguing with her boyfriend on the street. Believing that Latika deserves to be punished, he decides to teach her a lesson in his own way. He later kidnaps Latika, and brutally rapes and tortures her before strangling her to death.

The case is assigned to newly appointed Superintendent of Police Shivani Shivaji Roy (Rani Mukerji). During a press conference, Shivani describes Latika's killer as a lowlife and vows to bring him to justice within a few days. Her remarks anger Sunny and wound his ego. In response, he sends Shivani an anonymous letter, secretly enters her house, and steals some of her makeup and clothing. He also begins working at the tea stall located opposite Shivani's police station, allowing him to serve her tea every day while secretly observing her movements.

Sunny is also a contract killer. He accepts a job from politician Viplav Beniwal to assassinate investigative journalist Kamal Parihar and make the death appear to be a suicide. Sunny carries out the murder, but when Shivani examines the crime scene, she immediately realizes that Kamal's death was staged. The sari used to hang Kamal is the same sari that Sunny had stolen from her house. Shivani concludes that the same person is responsible for both Latika's murder and Kamal's killing.

A young boy claims to have witnessed the killer, prompting the police to bring him to the station so that an artist can prepare a sketch of the suspect. Taking advantage of his position at the tea stall, Sunny secretly kills the boy before the sketch can begin. The murder of the young witness sparks public outrage, and Shivani is transferred by her superior. Determined to catch the killer before her transfer takes effect, she decides to solve the case within two days.

Using her police informants in the underworld, Shivani identifies the politician who hired the killer and learns the killer's name. Realizing that his cover is about to be exposed, Sunny attacks Shivani and attempts to kill her. Shivani fights back, but Sunny manages to escape.

Shivani subsequently reveals Sunny's identity on television, along with an old video showing him harassing a woman on a bus. Once again, Sunny's ego is wounded. He retaliates by kidnapping the granddaughter of an MLA and threatens to kill her unless the MLA forces Shivani to publicly apologize to him within two hours. The MLA follows Sunny's instructions and attempts to make Shivani apologize, but she refuses. Shivani instead manages to locate and rescue the MLA's granddaughter. Sunny, now on the run, calls Shivani and challenges her again, announcing that he will kidnap and kill another woman.

By analyzing Viplav Beniwal's network, Shivani and her team determine that Sunny's next target is Sunanda, a political rival of Viplav. They rush to Sunanda's location to protect her, but arrive too late and discover that she has already been kidnapped. The police begin searching for Sunanda. During the investigation, Shivani recognizes several decoys and other attempts by Sunny to divert the police's attention.

Shivani eventually tracks him down and finds Sunny in the house of a local couple whose daughter he took hostage, torturing both Sunanda and the other young woman, whom he is preparing to kill. Sunny knocks Shivani unconscious and ties her up. After regaining consciousness, Shivani stops Sunny from killing Sunanda by talking about his past: as a child, Sunny's abusive father had tried to murder his mother, who had been an outspoken woman. In terror, Sunny's mother had hidden on the roof terrace, but Sunny told his father where she was hiding; his father then strangled her to death. The guilt and trauma of his mother's death caused Sunny to become unhinged and take that anger out on other similarly confident women.

Just as Sunny is about to kill Shivani, Sunanda and the other woman manage to blindside him by throwing paint on him. Shivani then fights Sunny and manages to overpower him. Shivani drives Sunny out into the street, where she brutally beats him in public with a belt. The film ends with Sunanda and the other woman beating Sunny with the belt as Shivani and the neighborhood watch on.

== Cast ==
- Rani Mukerji as SP Shivani Shivaji Roy IPS, Rajasthan Police
- Vishal Jethwa as Shiv "Sunny" Prasad Yadav
- Jisshu Sengupta as Dr. Bikram Roy, Shivani's husband
- Shruti Bapna as Inspector Bharti Angare
- Rajesh Sharma as Amit Kumar
- Prasanna Ketkar as Panditji
- Anurag Sharma as Journalist Kamal Parihar
- Vikram Singh Chauhan as Inspector Anup Singhal
- Deepika Amin as Dr. Harni Kapur
- Sunny Hinduja as Viplav Beniwal
- Avneet Kaur as Meera, Shivani's niece
- Sumit Nijhawan as DSP Shekhawat
- Garima Jain as News Reporter
- Anchal Sahu as Brij's daughter
- Virti Vaghani as Priyanka, Panditji's daughter
- Pariva Pranati as Aabha Parihar
- Tejasvi Singh Ahlawat as Latika Aggarwal
- Richa Meena as Sunanda Choudhary
- Ravi Kothari as SP Vijay
- K. C. Shankar as Inspector General of Police

== Production ==
=== Development ===
On 10 December 2018, Yash Raj Films announced that a sequel to Mardaani titled Mardaani 2 would be written and directed by Gopi Puthran, the writer of Mardaani. Rani Mukerji was confirmed to be reprising her role. Vikram Singh Chauhan and Shruti Bapna were cast in pivotal roles. Vishal Jethwa was cast as the antagonist, marking his feature film debut.

=== Filming ===
Principal photography began on 27 March 2019. The film was extensively filmed in Kota and Jaipur, Rajasthan. Filming was wrapped on 29 May 2019.

== Reception ==
=== Box office ===
The film collected ₹3.80 crore on its opening day. In the next two days, it earned nett ₹6.55 crore and ₹7.80 crore respectively. It grossed ₹67.12 in worldwide areas, consisting of ₹56.63 crore (Indian gross) and ₹10.49 crore (overseas gross).

=== Critical response ===
On the review aggregator website Rotten Tomatoes, 50% of 14 critics' reviews are positive, with an average rating of 6.3/10.

Times of India gave the film 3.5 out of 5 stars describing Mukerji as "the force behind this gritty drama". Hindustan Times said that "Rani Mukerji steals the show in a soul-stirring and well timed thriller". NDTV gave the film 3 out of 5 stars calling Mukerji as ''Good As Ever In This Cop-On-A Mission Thriller. Bollywood Hungama gave the film 3.5 out of 5 stars praising the screenplay and performances of Mukerji and Jethwa. India Today gave the film 3 out of 5 stars praising Puthren's direction and Jethwa's performance.

== Awards and nominations ==
Award	Date of ceremony	Category	Recipient(s)	Result	Ref.
Filmfare Awards	15 February 2020	Best Actress	Rani Mukherjee	Nominated	
Filmfare Awards	15 February 2020	Best Male Debut	Vishal Jethwa	Nominated	
Filmfare Awards	15 February 2020	Best Debut Director	Gopi Puthran	Nominated	
Zee Cine Awards	28 March 2020	Best Actress	Rani Mukherjee	Nominated	
Zee Cine Awards	28 March 2020	Best Male Debut	Vishal Jethwa	Won	

== Sequel ==
A sequel titled Mardaani 3 directed by Abhiraj Minawala was released on 30 January 2026.
