= Mardaani 3 =

2026 Indian film by Abhiraj Minawala

- Theatrical release poster
- Directed by: Abhiraj Minawala
- Written by: Aayush Gupta
- Story by: Aayush Gupta; Deepak Kingrani; Baljeet Singh Marwah
- Produced by: Aditya Chopra
- Starring: Rani Mukerji; Janki Bodiwala; Mallika Prasad; Prajesh Kashyap
- Cinematography: Artur Żurawski
- Edited by: Yasha Ramchandani
- Music by: Songs: Sarthak Kalyani; Score: John Stewart Eduri
- Production company: Yash Raj Films
- Distributed by: Yash Raj Films
- Release date: 30 January 2026
- Running time: 129 minutes
- Country: India
- Language: Hindi
- Budget: est. ₹52 crore
- Box office: est. ₹78.82 crore

Mardaani 3 (transl. Manly 3) is a 2026 Indian Hindi-language action thriller film directed by Abhiraj Minawala and produced by Aditya Chopra under Yash Raj Films. A sequel to the 2019 film Mardaani 2 and the third and final instalment in the Mardaani Trilogy, it stars Rani Mukerji in the lead role, alongside Janki Bodiwala and Mallika Prasad. The narrative follows police officer Shivani Shivaji Roy as she investigates the case of 93 young girls who have gone missing under mysterious circusmtances in just three months.

Mardaani 3 was theatrically released on 30 January 2026.

== Plot ==
In Bulandshahr, Ruhani, the daughter of Indian Diplomat Sahu, is abducted while playing hide-and-seek with Jhimli, the daughter of a domestic help. When Jhimli attempts to intervene, she is abducted as well. Meanwhile, in the Sundarbans, SSP Shivani Shivaji Roy dismantles a women and drug trafficking operation. Impressed by her work, Sahu recommends Shivani to lead the investigation into Ruhani’s disappearance, while also announcing a public ransom of ₹2 crore.

The kidnappers initially hand the girls over to Amma, the powerful leader of a beggar mafia network, but later take Ruhani to extort the ransom directly. Despite Shivani overseeing the exchange, the criminals evade using a prerecorded video call to deceive the police. One gang member is captured and reveals links to Amma’s organisation. Shivani discovers that 93 girls aged eight to nine from impoverished families have gone missing in three months, leading her to suspect that Ruhani was abducted after being mistaken for a poor child.

Following leads, the police track two of Amma’s enforcers to Treta Trust, a rehabilitation centre run by Ramanujan, who claims to work against beggar mafias. The enforcers are killed in an encounter while attempting to murder him. Soon after, Amma intimidates Shivani by breaking into her home. A raid on Prince Lodge results in a shootout where the kidnappers are killed, and Ramanujan is sent to rescue Ruhani. He instead murders her, revealing himself to be a mole within the police force working for Amma. Amma then threatens Shivani, who vows to rescue Jhimli.

Shivani is removed from the case by senior officials, but continues investigating unofficially. She finds one missing girl in a hospital, terminally ill with advanced cervical cancer, who dies shortly after revealing that several girls were nearly burned alive. Shivani links a symbol in the girl’s drawings to Treta Trust and uncovers Ramanujan’s past as a child abducted by Amma and raised within her network. Shivani arrests Ramanujan and Amma, but due to lack of evidence and manipulation by Ramanujan, he is released, Shivani is suspended, and a key witness dies in custody. Ramanujan, Amma, and accomplice Fatima flee to Colombo.

Shivani forms an independent team and pursues them overseas with Sahu’s support. It is revealed that the girls were abducted to be used as test subjects in illegal experiments involving a mutated HPV virus intended to accelerate cervical cancer drug trials. Girls deemed unsuitable were killed to avoid detection, explaining Ruhani’s murder. Shivani captures Amma and confronts Ramanujan in Colombo, revealing that Fatima was planted as an informant. Amma is killed during an escape attempt, and Ramanujan’s operation is thwarted. Shivani ensures the rescued girls are repatriated.

In the aftermath, Shivani injects Ramanujan with the same virus used on the victims, leaving him to die slowly while in custody. She is reinstated into the police force, awarded the President’s Medal, and granted leadership of a special task force with operational autonomy. Jhimli is reunited with her father, and Sahu finds closure.

== Cast ==
- Rani Mukerji as SSP Shivani Shivaji Roy IPS
- Janki Bodiwala as Constable Fatima Anwar
- Mallika Prasad as Amma
- Jisshu Sengupta as Dr. Bikram Roy, Shivani's husband
- Prajesh Kashyap as Ramanujan
  - Somansh Singh Dangwal as young Ramanujan
- Indraneel Bhattacharya as Ambassador Sahu
- Mikhail Yawalkar as Inspector Balwinder Singh Sodhi
- Digvijay Rohidas as Jafar
- Jimpa Sangpo Bhutia as Jimpa
- Avanee Joshi as Ruhani, Sahu's daughter
- Diorr Varghese as Jhimli
- Jaipreet Singh as the Director General of the National Investigation Agency
- Naved Aslam as Home Secretary Vijender Sahani
- Aurobindo Bhattacharjee as ASP, Delhi Police
- Roopangi Vanvari as Smita, Sahu's wife
- Pawan Kumar Singh as Caretaker Monu
- Dhananjay Singh as Inspector General, Uttar Pradesh Police
- Shashie Verma as Station House Officer, Lodhi Colony Station
- Kuldeep Singh as Sub Inspector Ahmed
- Shashank Shende as Aslam
- Rushad Rana as Prajapati
- Mahesh Ginnilal as Lallan
- Deepak Kamboj as Bilal
- Vicky Kanadi as Munna
- Aeklavya Tomer as KD
- Adesh Pandit as Pinku
- Sukumar Tudu as Bengali Boss
- Jeffery Goldberg as Mr. Wyland

== Production ==
=== Development ===
Yash Raj Films officially announced the project on 13 December 2024, with Rani Mukerji confirmed to reprise her role as Shivani Shivaji Roy. Abhiraj Minawala was roped in to direct the film, replacing Gopi Puthran, the writer and director of Mardaani 2. Mallika Prasad was cast as the antagonist, becoming the first female villain in the franchise. Janki Bodiwala was cast in a pivotal role.

=== Filming ===
Principal photography began in March 2025 and concluded in November 2025. Filming took place primarily in Delhi and Mumbai, with additional scenes shot in Haryana, Noida, Pondicherry, and Colombo.

== Music ==
Mardaani 3

Soundtrack album by Sarthak Kalyani
- Released: 20 January 2026
- Recorded: 2025
- Genre: Feature Film Soundtrack
- Length: 3:11
- Language: Hindi
- Label: YRF Music
- Producer: Sarthak Kalyani
External audio
- Babbar Sherni Video Song on YouTube

The single track "Babbar Sherni" was released on 20 January 2026.

Track listing
No.	Title	Lyrics	Music	Singer(s)	Length
1.	"Babbar Sherni"	Shruti Shukla	Sarthak Kalyani	Sarthak Kalyani, Dee MC	3:11
Total length:					3:11

== Release ==
=== Theatrical ===
Mardaani 3 was theatrically released on 30 January 2026. It was initially scheduled to release on 27 February 2026, coinciding with the Holi weekend, before being preponed.

=== Home media ===
The post-theatrical digital streaming rights of the film were acquired by Netflix. The film began streaming on Netflix from 27 March 2026. World Television Premiere Satellite Rights Sony Max Date Confirm Sun 16th August 2026

== Reception ==
=== Box office ===
Mardaani 3 grossed ₹5.95 crore (US$620,000) worldwide on its opening day. In its first week, the film grossed ₹38.94 crore (US$4.0 million) worldwide.

=== Critical response ===
On the review aggregator website Rotten Tomatoes, 50% of 12 critics' reviews are positive, with an average rating of 6.4/10.

A critic from Bollywood Hungama gave 3.5 out of 5 stars, describing the film as a powerful, intense, and hard-hitting thriller that stays true to the sole of the franchise. The review highlighted Mukerji's performance, the direction, screenplay, background score, and technical aspects, but criticised the twists in the second half. Saibal Chatterjee of NDTV gave 3.5 out of 5 stars, writing, "Rani Mukerji delivers a power-packed, unblemished star turn that should rank among the finest of her 30-year acting career". Vineeta Kumar of India Today gave 3 out of 5 stars, praising the cast performances, action sequences, and background score, but felt that no part of the film matches the raw impact of the first film. Dhaval Roy of The Times of India gave 3.5 out of 5 stars, writing, "Mardaani 3 isn't without flaws, but it still holds as a solid franchise outing anchored by Rani Mukerji's performance". Rishabh Suri of the Hindustan Times gave 3 out of 5 stars, praising Mukerji's performance and the pacing, but criticised the narrative. Lachmi Deb Roy of Firstpost gave 4 out of 5 stars, praising the performances of Rani Mukerji and Mallika Prasad.

Shaschi Chaturvedi of News18 gave 3.5 out of 5 stars, praising the cast performances, writing, and technical aspects, however felt there was scope to sharpen the script. Shubhra Gupta of The Indian Express gave 2 out of 5 stars, writing, "Rani Mukerji can't do much with the degree of over-writing and predictable plot-points". Rahul Desai of The Hollywood Reporter India wrote, "Mardaani 3 isn't a bad film. It's just not very good, fresh, surprising or smart. It coasts through on hot air, releashed emotions, and predictable commentary. In other words, it's more of a producer-driven template than a director-and-writer fuelled one".

== Controversy ==
According to reports, the film was allegedly linked to a publicity stunt involving claims of "800 missing children in Delhi", coinciding with the film's release. The Delhi Police stated, "After certain clues, we learned that publicity regarding the increasing number of missing girls in Delhi was being spread in exchange for money. Creating panic for profit will not be tolerated, and strict action will be taken against those involved". However, these claims were denied by Yash Raj Films.
