= Pradeep Sarkar =

Indian film director (1955–2023)

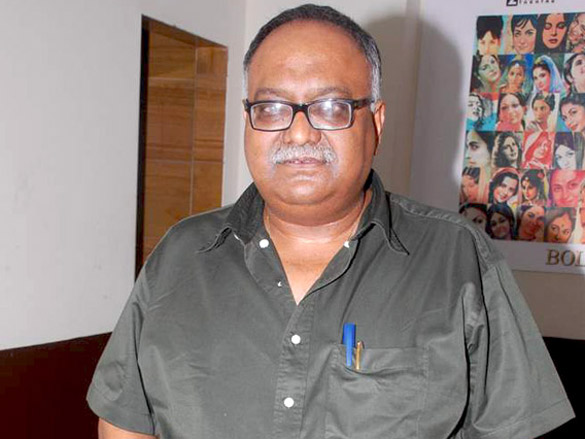
- Sarkar at special screening of Memories in March
- Born: 30 April 1955; Calcutta, West Bengal, India
- Died: 24 March 2023 (aged 67); Mumbai, Maharashtra, India
- Occupations: Director; screenwriter; editor

Pradeep Sarkar (30 April 1955 – 24 March 2023) was an Indian director and screenwriter, best known for directing Parineeta (2005). He was a recipient of the Abby Award, Rapa Award, and the National Film Award. His body of work spans movies, music videos, feature film songs, and over 1000 commercials.

== Personal life ==
Sarkar was born in Kolkata, West Bengal, on 30 April 1955.

He attended Delhi College of Art and graduated with a gold medal in 1979. After a 17-year stint in mainstream advertising as a creative director, he started directing advertisement films within the advertising circles of Delhi. Sarkar was married to Panchali Sarkar, and they have a son, Ronit Sarkar, known as indie musician Rono.

Sarkar was admitted to Lilavati Hospital and Research Centre in Bandra, Mumbai on 22 March 2023 with fever and other complications where he died on 24 March 2023.

== Career ==
Sarkar's production house shot commercials for clients such as Tata Yellow Pages, ICICI Prudential, and Onida KY Thunder. The Aaj Tak TV commercials, shot in black and white, won both the Rapa Award and the Best Director of the Year Award at the Abby's.

Apart from commercials, Sarkar was also a prolific music video director. Shubha Mudgal's Ab Ke Saawan, Euphoria's Dhoom Pichak Dhoom and Maaeri, Sultan Khan's Piya Basanti, and Bhupen Hazarika's Ganga are some of his popular works.

He worked with Vidhu Vinod Chopra and directed songs in Mission Kashmir and Munna Bhai M.B.B.S. Chopra picked Sarkar to direct Parineeta and won the National Film Award in the Best Debut Film of a Director category. Sarkar also won the Best Debutant Director in Screen Awards and the Hottest Young Director in Stardust Awards in 2006. Parineeta also went on to win five Filmfare Awards.

His next three feature films were Laaga Chunari Mein Daag, Lafangey Parindey, and Mardaani, all of which were produced by Yash Raj Films. His 2018 film, Eela, was produced by Ajay Devgn Films. Sarkar was working on his “dream project” at the time of his death. The project titled ‘Priya Interrupted’, it was to be the biopic of Priya Rajvansh. Sarkar's first movie under Yash Raj Films was Laaga Chunari Mein Daag, which the New York Times dubbed as a "feminist fairy tale".

== Filmography ==
Year	Film	Director	Other
2003	Munna Bhai M.B.B.S		Editor
2005	Parineeta	Yes	Art Director
2007	Eklavya: The Royal Guard		Creative Director
2007	Laaga Chunari Mein Daag	Yes	Producer
2010	Lafangey Parindey	Yes	
2014	Mardaani	Yes	
2018	Helicopter Eela	Yes	
2021	Jokhon Ratri Name		Executive Producer

=== Web series ===
Year	Title	Director	Platform(s)	Notes
2019	Coldd Lassi Aur Chicken Masala	Yes	ALTBalaji; ZEE5	
2020	Arranged Marriage	Yes	ZEE5	
2020	Forbidden Love	Yes	ZEE5	
2022	Duranga	Yes	ZEE5	

=== Selected music videos ===
Year	Title	Artists	Notes
1998	Dhoom	Euphoria	From the Album Dhoom.
1999	Ab Ke Saawan	Shubha Mudgal	
2000	Maaeri	Euphoria	From the Album Phir Dhoom.
2000	Piya Basanti	Sultan Khan and K.S.Chithra	
2000	Ganga	Bhupen Hazarika	
2017	Ik Vaari	Ayushmann Khurrana	

== Awards and nominations ==
Year	Award	Work	Result	Notes
2005	Filmfare Award for Best Art Direction	Parineeta	Won	
2005	Zee Cine Award for Most Promising Director	Parineeta	Won	
2005	Filmfare Award for Best Director	Parineeta	Nominated	
2006	Indira Gandhi Award for Best Debut Film of a Director	Parineeta	Won	
