= 54th Filmfare Awards =

2009 awards for Hindi cinema

- Date: 28 February 2009
- Site: Yash Raj Studios
- Hosted by: Ranbir Kapoor; Imran Khan; Deepika Padukone; Konkana Sen Sharma; Karan Johar; Farhan Akhtar
- Official website: www.filmfare.com

Highlights
- Best Film: Jodhaa Akbar
- Critics Award for Best Film: Mumbai Meri Jaan
- Most awards: Rock On!! (7)
- Most nominations: Rock On!! (15)

Television coverage
- Network: Sony Entertainment Television (India)

The 54th Idea Filmfare Awards ceremony, presented by The Times Group and Idea Cellular, was one of India's most prestigious awards ceremony, honoring the best Bollywood films of 2008. It took place on 28 February 2009 at the Yash Raj Studios, Mumbai. Actors Ranbir Kapoor and Imran Khan hosted the first half of the show, while actresses Konkona Sen Sharma and Deepika Padukone hosted the latter half. It was the first time that any of these actors hosted the awards ceremony. The ceremony was televised in India eight days later, on 8 March 2009.

The nominees for the various films were announced on 16 February 2009. Rock On!! led the ceremony with 15 nominations, followed by Jaane Tu... Ya Jaane Na with 12 nominations, Jodhaa Akbar with 11 nominations and Rab Ne Bana Di Jodi with 10 nominations respectively.

Rock On!! won 7 awards, including Best Supporting Actor (for Arjun Rampal) and Best Male Debut (for Farhan Akhtar), thus becoming the most-awarded film at the ceremony.

Jodhaa Akbar won 5 awards under the main category, including Best Film, Best Director (for Ashutosh Gowariker) and Best Actor (for Hrithik Roshan).

Priyanka Chopra won her first Best Actress award for her performance in Fashion, while Asin Thottumkal won Best Female Debut for her performance in Ghajini.

== Awards and nominees ==
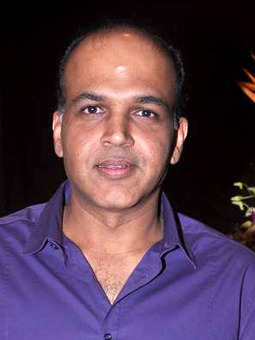
Ashutosh Gowariker, Best Director

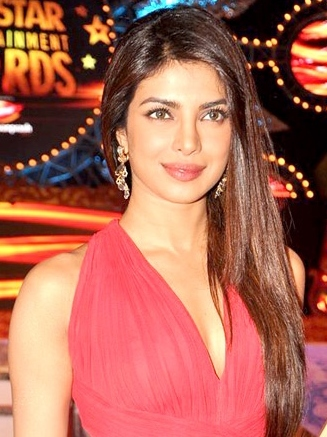
Priyanka Chopra, Best Actress

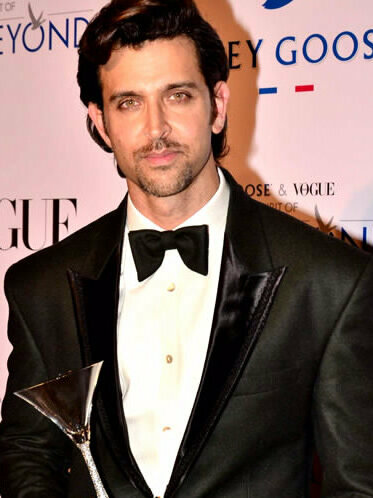
Hrithik Roshan, Best Actor

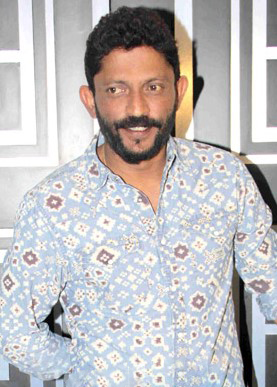
Nishikant Kamat, Best Director Critics

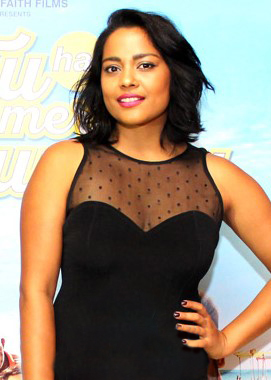
Shahana Goswami, Best Actress Critics

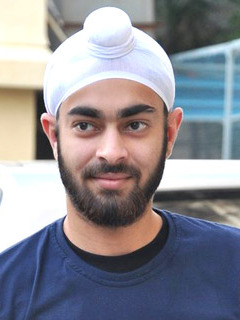
Manjot Singh, Best Actor Critics

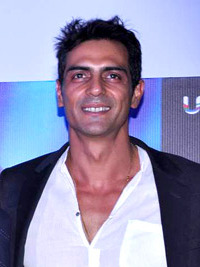
Arjun Rampal, Best Supporting Actor

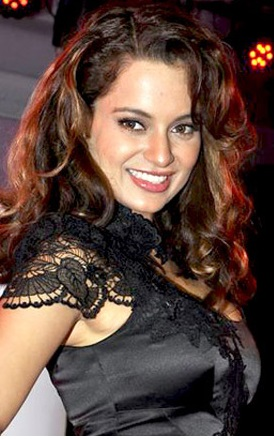
Kangana Ranaut, Best Supporting Actress

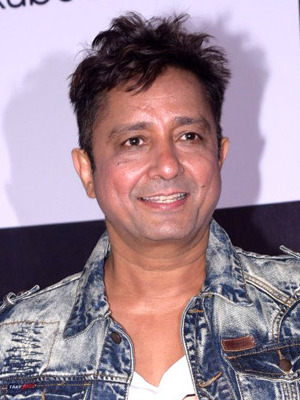
Sukhwinder Singh, Best Male Playback Singer

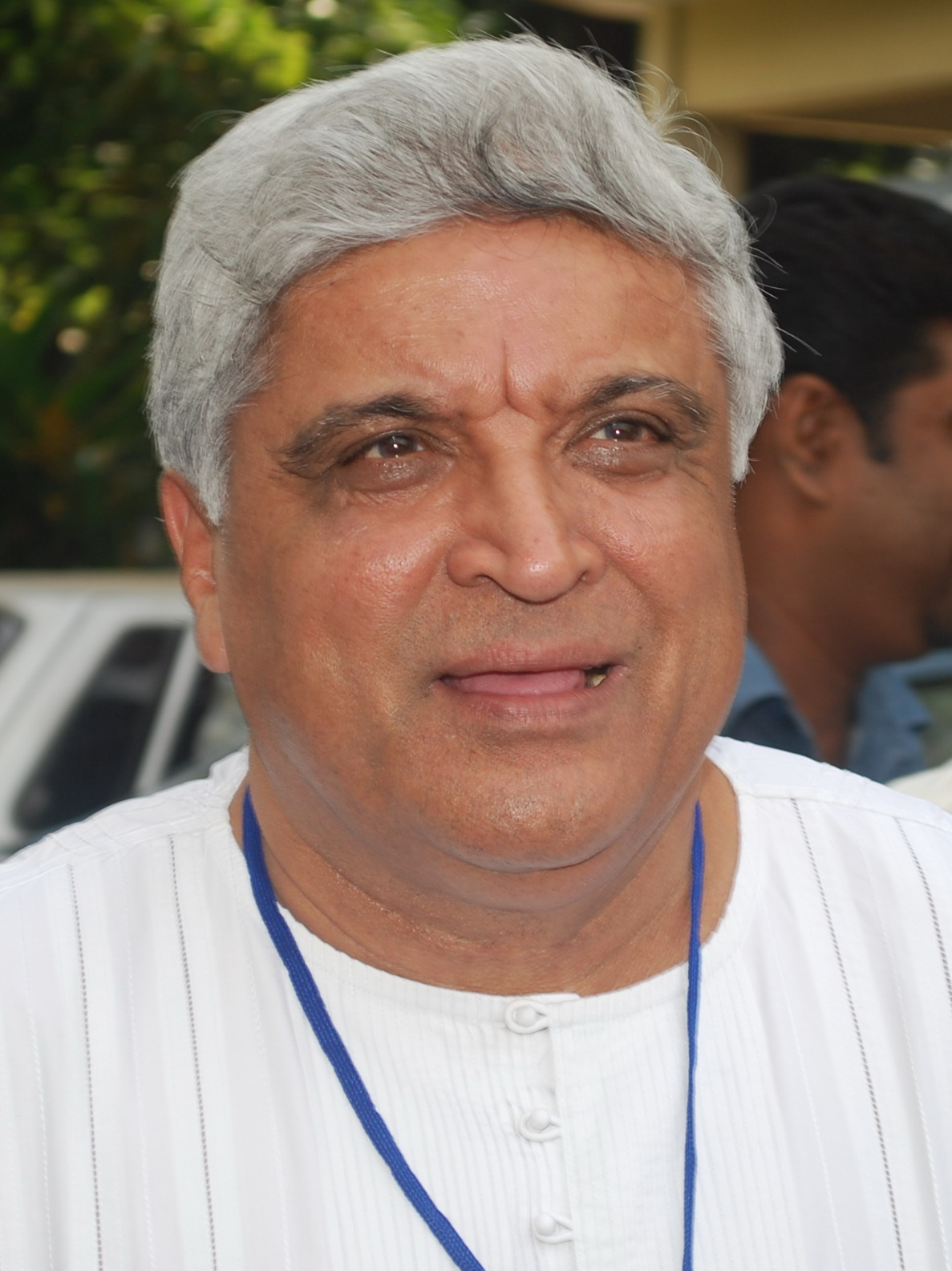
Javed Akhtar, Best Lyricist

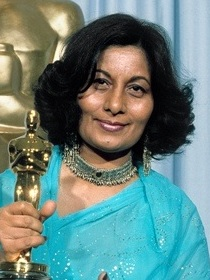
Bhanu Athaiya, Lifetime Achievement Awardee

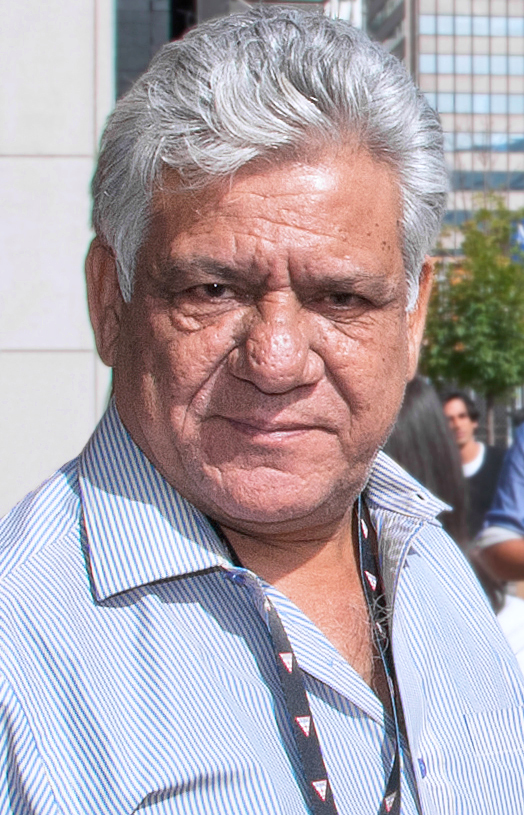
Om Puri, Lifetime Achievement Awardee

=== Main awards ===
Best Film	Best Director
Jodhaa Akbar — Ashutosh Gowariker Productions and UTV Motion Pictures; Dostana — Dharma Productions; Ghajini — Geetha Arts; Jaane Tu... Ya Jaane Na — Aamir Khan Productions; Rab Ne Bana Di Jodi — Yash Raj Films; Rock On!! — Excel Entertainment	Ashutosh Gowariker – Jodhaa Akbar; A. R. Murugadoss – Ghajini; Abhishek Kapoor – Rock On!!; Aditya Chopra – Rab Ne Bana Di Jodi; Madhur Bhandarkar – Fashion; Neeraj Pandey – A Wednesday
Best Actor	Best Actress
Hrithik Roshan – Jodhaa Akbar as Jalaluddin Mohammed Akbar; Aamir Khan – Ghajini as Sanjay Singhania/Sachin Chauhan; Abhishek Bachchan – Dostana as Sameer "Sam" Kapoor; Akshay Kumar – Singh Is Kinng as Happy Singh; Naseeruddin Shah – A Wednesday as "The Common Man"; Shah Rukh Khan – Rab Ne Bana Di Jodi as Surinder Sahni / Raj Kapoor	Priyanka Chopra – Fashion as Meghna Mathur; Aishwarya Rai – Jodhaa Akbar as Jodhaa Bai; Anushka Sharma – Rab Ne Bana Di Jodi as Taani Gupta Sahni; Asin Thottumkal – Ghajini as Kalpana Shetty; Kajol – U Me Aur Hum as Piya Thapar
Best Supporting Actor	Best Supporting Actress
Arjun Rampal – Rock On!! as Joseph 'Joe' Mascarenhas; Abhishek Bachchan – Sarkar Raj as Shankar Nagre; Prateik Babbar – Jaane Tu... Ya Jaane Na as Amit Mahant; Sonu Sood – Jodhaa Akbar as Prince Sujamal; Tusshar Kapoor – Golmaal Returns as Lucky Gill; Vinay Pathak – Rab Ne Bana Di Jodi as Balwinder "Bobby" Khosla	Kangana Ranaut – Fashion as Shonali Gujral; Bipasha Basu – Bachna Ae Haseeno as Radhika / Shreya Rathore; Jiah Khan – Ghajini as Sunita Kalantri; Kirron Kher – Dostana as Mrs. Acharya; Ratna Pathak Shah – Jaane Tu... Ya Jaane Na as Savitri Singh Rathore; Shahana Goswami – Rock On!! as Debbie Mascarenhas
Best Male Debut	Best Female Debut
Farhan Akhtar – Rock On!! as Aditya 'Adi' Shroff; Imran Khan – Jaane Tu... Ya Jaane Na as Jai Singh Rathore; Anurag Sinha – Black & White as Numair Qazi; Harman Baweja – Love Story 2050 as Karan Malhotra; Nikhil Dwivedi – My Name Is Anthony Gonsalves as Anthony Gonsalves; Prateik Babbar – Jaane Tu... Ya Jaane Na as Amit Mahant; Rajeev Khandelwal – Aamir as Dr. Aamir Ali; Sikandar Kher – Woodstock Villa as Sameer / Akshay Kapadia	Asin Thottumkal – Ghajini as Kalpana Shetty; Adah Sharma – 1920 as Lisa Singh Rathod; Anushka Sharma – Rab Ne Bana Di Jodi as Taani Gupta Sahni; Mugdha Godse – Fashion as Janet Sequeira Arora; Prachi Desai – Rock On!! as Sakshi Shroff; Sonal Chauhan – Jannat as Zoya Mathur
Best Music Director	Best Lyricist
A. R. Rahman – Jaane Tu... Ya Jaane Na; A. R. Rahman – Ghajini; A. R. Rahman – Jodhaa Akbar; Pritam – Race; Shankar–Ehsaan–Loy – Rock On!!; Vishal–Shekhar – Dostana	Javed Akhtar – Jashn-E-Bahara – Jodhaa Akbar; Abbas Tyrewala – Kabhi Kabhi Aditi – Jaane Tu... Ya Jaane Na; Gulzar – Tu Hi To Meri Dost Hai – Yuvvraaj; Jaideep Sahni – Haule Haule – Rab Ne Bana Di Jodi; Javed Akhtar – Socha Hai – Rock On!!; Prasoon Joshi – Guzaarish – Ghajini
Best Playback Singer – Male	Best Playback Singer – Female
Sukhwinder Singh – Haule Haule – Rab Ne Bana Di Jodi; Farhan Akhtar – Socha Hai – Rock On!!; K.K. – Khuda Jaane – Bachna Ae Haseeno; K.K. – Zara Sa – Jannat; Rashid Ali – Kabhi Kabhi Aditi – Jaane Tu... Ya Jaane Na; Sonu Niigaam – Inn Lamho Ke Daaman Mein – Jodhaa Akbar	Shreya Ghoshal – Teri Ore – Singh Is Kinng; Alka Yagnik – Tu Muskura – Yuvvraaj; Neha Bhasin – Kuch Khaas Hai – Fashion; Shilpa Rao – Khuda Jaane – Bachna Ae Haseeno; Shruti Pathak – Mar Jawaan – Fashion; Sunidhi Chauhan – Dance Pe Chance – Rab Ne Bana Di Jodi

=== Critics' awards ===
Best Movie
Mumbai Meri Jaan (Nishikant Kamat)
Best Performance
Male	Female
Manjot Singh – Oye Lucky! Lucky Oye!	Shahana Goswami – Rock On!!

=== Technical awards ===
Best Story	Best Screenplay
Abhishek Kapoor – Rock On!!; Aseem Arora – Heroes; Dibakar Banerjee, Urmi Juvekar – Oye Lucky! Lucky Oye!; Neeraj Pandey – A Wednesday; Santosh Sivan – Tahaan	Yogesh Vinayak Joshi, Upendra Sidhaye – Mumbai Meri Jaan; Abbas Tyrewala – Jaane Tu... Ya Jaane Na; Abhishek Kapoor, Pubali Chaudhary – Rock On!!; Ajay Monga, Anuradha Tiwari, Madhur Bhandarkar – Fashion; Shiraz Ahmed – Race
Best Dialogue	Best Editing
Manu Rishi – Oye Lucky! Lucky Oye!; Abbas Tyrewala – Jaane Tu... Ya Jaane Na; K. P. Saxena – Jodhaa Akbar; Neeraj Pandey – A Wednesday; Yogesh Vinayak Joshi – Mumbai Meri Jaan	Amit Pawar – Mumbai Meri Jaan
Best Choreography	Best Cinematography
Longines Fernandes – "Pappu Can't Dance Saala!" from – Jaane Tu... Ya Jaane Na	Jason West – Rock On!!
Best Production Design	Best Sound Design
Vandan Kataria, Monica Angelina Bhowmick – Oye Lucky! Lucky Oye!	Vinod Subramaniyam – Rock On!!
Best Costume Design	Best Background Score
Manoshi Nath, Rushi Sharma – Oye Lucky! Lucky Oye!	A. R. Rahman – Jodhaa Akbar
Best Special Effects	Best Action
John Deitz – Love Story 2050	Peter Hein – Ghajini

=== Special awards ===
Lifetime Achievement
Bhanu Athaiya	Om Puri
Special Jury Mention (certificate)
Prateik Babbar (actor) – Jaane Tu... Ya Jaane Na	Purab Kohli (actor) – Rock On!!
RD Burman Award
Benny Dayal
Best Scene
Rab Ne Bana Di Jodi; Dostana; Jodhaa Akbar; Rock On!!

== Multiple nominations and wins ==
The following films received multiple nominations.

- 10 nominations: Rab Ne Bana Di Jodi and Rock On!!
- 9 nominations: Jodhaa Akbar
- 7 nominations: Fashion, Ghajini and Jaane Tu... Ya Jaane Na
- 5 nominations: Dostana

The following films received multiple awards.

- 5 wins: Jodhaa Akbar and Rock On!!
- 4 wins: Jaane Tu Ya Jaane Na
- 3 wins: Oye Lucky! Lucky Oye!
- 2 wins: Fashion, Ghajini, Mumbai Meri Jaan and Rab Ne Bana Di Jodi
- 1 win: Love Story 2050 and Singh Is Kinng

=== Awards tally ===
– winner of the Filmfare Best Film Award, – nominees for Best Film

- Note : In some cases, the number of nominations can be less than the number of awards won. This is explained by the fact that there are some awards which do not have any nominations. So, a film could have won an award which does not have any list of nominees. Also, Critics' Awards are not included in the number of awards won by the films.

Film	Awards	Nominations	Notes
A Wednesday	0	4	This was Neeraj Pandey's first feature film as a director.; He was also the scriptwriter of the film, and it was his first time as scriptwriter as well.
Bachna Ae Haseeno	0	3	Bipasha Basu got her second nomination for Filmfare Award for Best Supporting Actress, after her role in No Entry. However, she failed to win it both times.; KK became only the third male playback singer to get multiple nominations in the Filmfare Award for Best Male Playback, after Sonu Nigam and Udit Narayan, since 2000.; Shilpa Rao debuted as a female playback singer with this film, and also received her first Filmfare Award for Best Female Playback nomination for this film.
Dostana	0	5	This film was the directorial debut of Tarun Mansukhani.; Dostana was only the second film which was produced by Karan Johar, but not directed by him, to get a nomination under the Filmfare Award for Best Film category (after Kal Ho Naa Ho (2003)). It was the second Karan Johar production which did not win a single Filmfare Award, after Kaal (2005).
Fashion	2	6	This film earned director Madhur Bhandarkar his second nomination under the Filmfare Award for Best Director, after Page 3 in 2006.; Priyanka Chopra won her first ever Filmfare Award for Best Actress for this film. Simultaneously, Kangana Ranaut won her first ever Filmfare Award for Best Supporting Actress for this film. Such a feat was last achieved in 2006, when Ayesha Kapoor and Rani Mukherji won the Best Supporting Actress and Best Actress Award respectively for Black.
Ghajini	2	7	This film saw the directorial debut of South Indian film-maker A. R. Murugadoss, who had also directed the Tamil version of this film. The Tamil version (also titled Ghajini) starred Surya Sivakumar.; South Indian actress Asin Thottumkal debuted in Bollywood with this film, and won the Filmfare Award for Best Female Debut. Incidentally, she had also starred as the female lead in the Tamil version of this film. Thus, she became the first actress to act in the same role in two films (remakes) of two different languages.; Aamir Khan had nominated for Best Actor, he had won previously Taare Zameen Par (2007).
Jaane Tu... Ya Jaane Na	3	7	A. R. Rahman became only the fourth music director in the history of Filmfare to win the Filmfare Award for Best Music Director three times in a row, after Shankar–Jaikishan, Laxmikant Pyarelal and Nadeem Shravan.
Jodhaa Akbar	5	9	Jodhaa Akbar was one of the major award winners, winning five Filmfare Awards, including Best Film, Best Director and Best Actor.
Love Story 2050	1	0	Love Story 2050 was the only film which did not receive any nomination under the categories having nominations, and yet won a Filmfare Award.; This was the first film of Harry Baweja to win a Filmfare Award.
Mumbai Meri Jaan	2	2	This was the Bollywood debut for director Nishikant Kamat. He had previously directed films for Marathi and Tamil cinema.; It later went on to win the National Film Award for Best Special Effects, which went to Govardhan of Tata Elxsi.
Oye Lucky! Lucky Oye!	3	2	Manu Rishi won his first ever Filmfare award for Oye Lucky! Lucky Oye!, winning the Filmfare Award for Best Dialogue.; This film became the largest Filmfare Award-winning Dibakar Banerjee, ahead of Khosla Ka Ghosla, which had won one Filmfare Award.; Manjot Singh received his first award ever for his critically appreciated role in the film, winning the Best Actor (Critics).
Rab Ne Bana Di Jodi	2	10	This was the debut film for actress Anushka Sharma. She was subsequently nominated for Filmfare Award for Best Female Debut, but lost out to Asin Thottumkal.; Shah Rukh Khan did not win an award for the first time under a film directed by Aditya Chopra. He had previously won for Dilwale Dulhaniya Le Jayenge (1995) and Mohabbatein (2000).
Rock On!!	5	10	Arjun Rampal won his first ever Filmfare Award (Filmfare Award for Best Supporting Actor) for his role in this film.; Farhan Akhtar debuted both as a playback singer and as an actor in this film. Subsequently, he won the Filmfare Award for Best Male Debut, and also received a nomination for Filmfare Award for Best Male Playback Singer.; Shahana Goswami received the Filmfare Award for Best Actress (Critics), and became the first actress to achieve this honour for a supporting role.
Singh Is Kinng	1	2	

== See also ==
- List of highest-grossing Bollywood films
