= 20th Screen Awards =

Indian film awards ceremony in 2014

- Date: 14 January 2014
- Hosted by: Shahrukh Khan

Highlights
- Best Picture: Bhaag Milkha Bhaag
- Best Direction: Shoojit Sircar (Madras Cafe)
- Best Actor: Farhan Akhtar (Bhaag Milkha Bhaag)
- Best Actress: Deepika Padukone (Chennai Express / Goliyon Ki Raasleela Ram-Leela)
- Most awards: Goliyon Ki Raasleela Ram-Leela (5)
- Most nominations: Goliyon Ki Raasleela Ram-Leela (16)

Television coverage
- Channel: Life OK
- Network: Star India

The 20th Life OK Screen Awards was the 20th edition of the annual Screen Awards held to honor the best films of 2013 from the Hindi-language film industry (commonly known as Bollywood). The ceremony was held on 14 January 2014 hosted by actor Shahrukh Khan.

Goliyon Ki Raasleela Ram-Leela led the ceremony with 16 nominations, followed by Kai Po Che! with 13 nominations and Dhoom 3 with 12 nominations.

Goliyon Ki Raasleela Ram-Leela won 5 awards, including Best Actress (for Deepika Padukone), thus becoming the most-awarded film at the ceremony.

== Awards ==
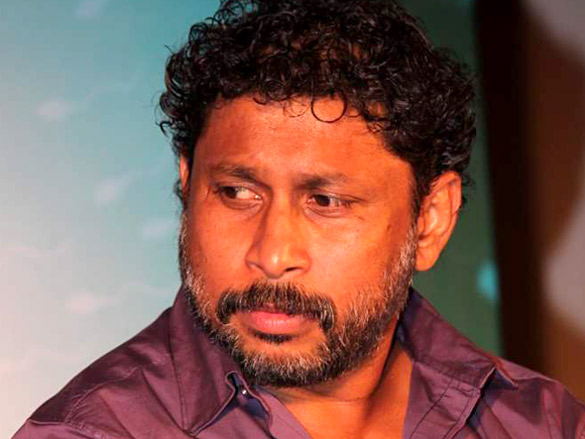
Shoojit Sircar — Best Director (Madras Cafe)

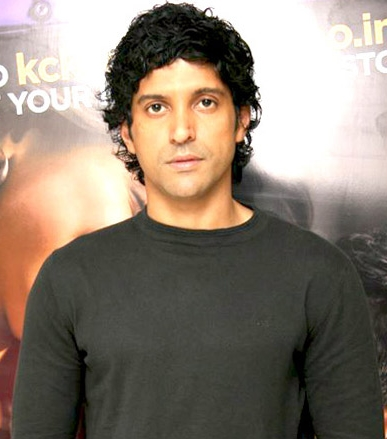
Farhan Akhtar — Best Actor (Bhaag Milkha Bhaag)

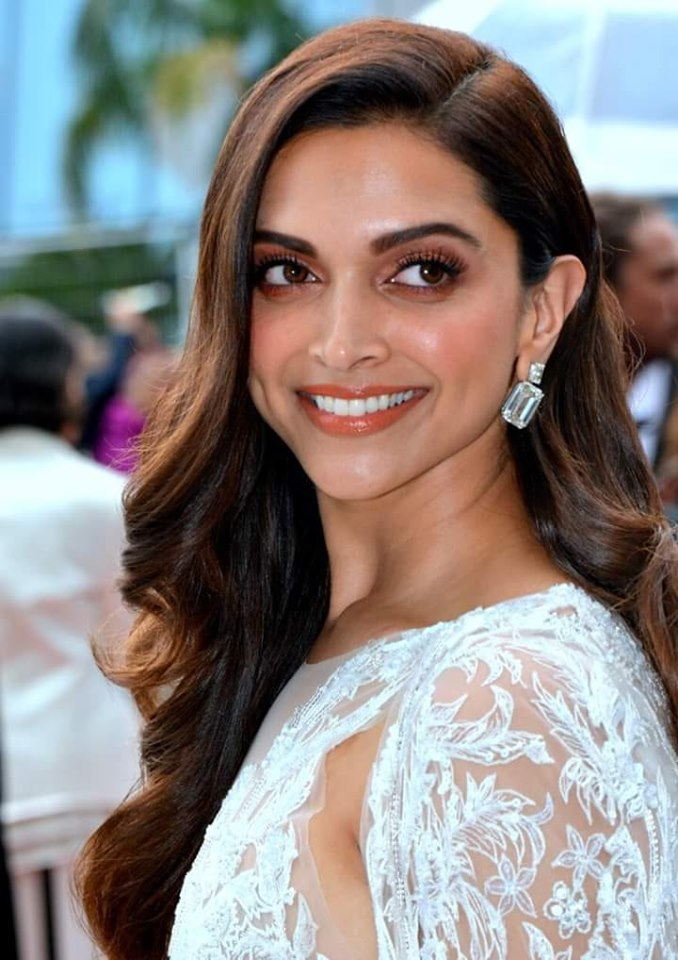
Deepika Padukone — Best Actress (Chennai Express)

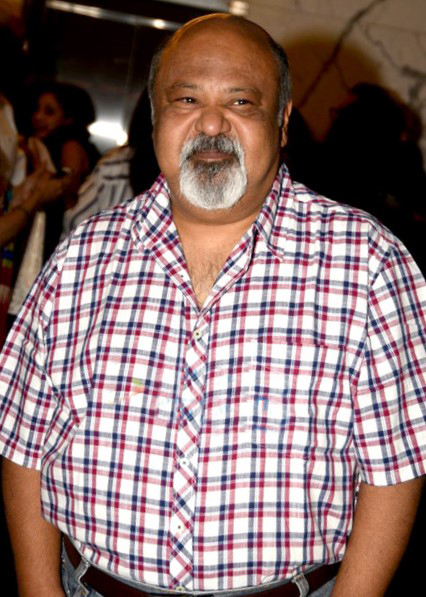
Saurabh Shukla — Best Supporting Actor (Jolly LLB)

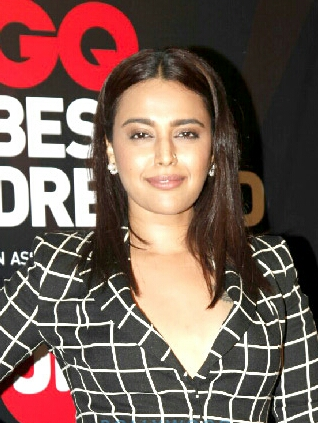
Swara Bhaskar — Best Supporting Actress (Raanjhanaa)

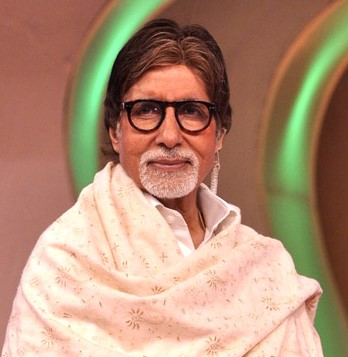
Amitabh Bachchan — Lifetime Achievement Awardee

The winners and nominees have been listed below. Winners are listed first, highlighted in boldface, and indicated with a double dagger (‡).

=== Jury Awards ===
Best Film	Best Director
**Bhaag Milkha Bhaag – Rakeysh Omprakash Mehra, Rajiv Tandon and P.S. Barathi**‡; Goliyon Ki Raasleela Ram-Leela – Sanjay Leela Bhansali and Kishore Lulla; Kai Po Che! – Ronnie Screwvala & Siddharth Roy Kapur; Madras Cafe – John Abraham, Viacom 18 Motion Pictures & Ronnie Lahiri; The Lunchbox – Arun Rangachari, Anurag Kashyap & Guneet Monga; Yeh Jawaani Hai Deewani – Karan Johar	**Shoojit Sircar – Madras Cafe**‡; Abhishek Kapoor – Kai Po Che!; Ayan Mukerji – Yeh Jawaani Hai Deewani; Hansal Mehta – Shahid; Rakesh Roshan – Krrish 3; Rakeysh Omprakash Mehra – Bhaag Milkha Bhaag; Sanjay Leela Bhansali – Goliyon Ki Raasleela Ram-Leela
Best Actor	Best Actress
**Farhan Akhtar – Bhaag Milkha Bhaag**‡; Aamir Khan – Dhoom 3; Dhanush – Raanjhanaa; Irrfan Khan – The Lunchbox; Rajkummar Rao – Shahid; Ranbir Kapoor – Yeh Jawaani Hai Deewani; Shah Rukh Khan – Chennai Express	**Deepika Padukone – Chennai Express / Goliyon Ki Raasleela Ram-Leela**‡; Chitrangada Singh – Inkaar; Nimrat Kaur – The Lunchbox; Parineeti Chopra – Shuddh Desi Romance; Shraddha Kapoor – Aashiqui 2; Sonakshi Sinha – Lootera
Best Supporting Actor	Best Supporting Actress
**Saurabh Shukla – Jolly LLB**‡; Amit Sadh – Kai Po Che!; Anupam Kher – Special 26; Jimmy Shergill – Bullett Raja; Nawazuddin Siddiqui – The Lunchbox; Mohammad Zeeshan Ayub – Raanjhanaa	**Swara Bhaskar – Raanjhanaa**‡; Divya Dutta – Gippi; Kalki Koechlin – Yeh Jawaani Hai Deewani; Konkona Sen Sharma – Ek Thi Daayan; Richa Chadda – Goliyon Ki Raasleela Ram-Leela
Best Actor in a Negative Role – Male	Best Actor in a Negative Role – Female
**Rishi Kapoor** – **D-Day**‡; Boman Irani – Jolly LLB; Jaideep Ahlawat – Commando: A One Man Army; Prakash Belawadi – Madras Cafe; Vivek Oberoi – Krrish 3	**Shilpa Shukla** – **B.A. Pass**‡; Kangana Ranaut – Krrish 3; Konkona Sen Sharma – Ek Thi Daayan; Shabana Azmi – Matru Ki Bijlee Ka Mandola; Supriya Pathak – Goliyon Ki Raasleela Ram-Leela
Best Actor in a Comic Role – Male / Female	Best Child Artist
**Richa Chadda** – **Fukrey**‡; Divyenndu – Chashme Baddoor; Kunal Khemu – Go Goa Gone; Uday Chopra – Dhoom 3; Varun Sharma – Fukrey	**Japtej Singh** – **Bhaag Milkha Bhaag**‡; Naman Jain – Bombay Talkies; Siddharth Nigam – Dhoom 3; Vishesh Tiwari – Ek Thi Daayan
Most Promising Newcomer – Male	Most Promising Newcomer – Female
**Sushant Singh Rajput – Kai Po Che!**‡; Girish Kumar – Ramaiya Vastavaiya; Manish Paul – Mickey Virus; Neeraj Kabi – Ship of Theseus	**Aida El-Kashef – Ship of Theseus**‡; Izabelle Leite – Sixteen; Shree Swara – D-Day; Vaani Kapoor – Shuddh Desi Romance
Most Promising Debut Director	Best Ensemble Cast
**Ritesh Batra – The Lunchbox**‡; Ajay Bahl – B.A. Pass; Anand Gandhi – Ship of Theseus; Kannan Iyer – Ek Thi Daayan; Raj Purohit – Sixteen	**Club 60**‡; Fukrey; Kai Po Che!; Sixteen
Best Music Director	Best Lyricist
**Pritam – Yeh Jawaani Hai Deewani**‡; Ankit Tiwari, Mithoon and Jeet Ganguly – Aashiqui 2; Amit Trivedi – Kai Po Che!; A.R. Rahman – Raanjhanaa; Shankar–Ehsaan–Loy – Bhaag Milkha Bhaag	**Swanand Kirkire – "Manja" – Kai Po Che!**‡; Amitabh Bhattacharya – "Balam Pichkari " – Yeh Jawaani Hai Deewani; Dr. Mahendra Madhukar – "Rooh Mein" – Club 60; Jaideep Sahni – "Dhoop Mein" – Shuddh Desi Romance; Prasoon Joshi – "Zinda" – Bhaag Milkha Bhaag; Prasoon Joshi – "Raghupati Raghav" – Satyagraha
Best Male Playback	Best Female Playback
**Arijit Singh – "Tum Hi Ho" – Aashiqui 2**‡; Amit Trivedi – "Manja" – Kai Po Che!; Benny Dayal – "Badtameez Dil" – Yeh Jawaani Hai Deewani; Raju Singh – "Rooh Mein" – Club 60; Siddharth Mahadevan – "Zinda" – Bhaag Milkha Bhaag	**Shreya Ghoshal – Sunn Raha Hai – Aashiqui 2**‡; Chinmayi – "Titli" – Chennai Express; Monali Thakur – "Sawaar Loon" – Lootera; Shalmali Kholgade – "Balam Pichkari" – Yeh Jawaani Hai Deewani; Sona Mohapatra – "Ambarsariya" – Fukrey

=== Technical Awards ===
Best Story	Best Screenplay
**Mohan Sikka** – **B.A. Pass**‡; Hansal Mehta & Sameer Gautam Singh – Shahid; Raj Purohit & Pawan Sony – Sixteen; Ritesh Batra – The Lunchbox; Subhash Kapoor – Jolly LLB; Sudhir Mishra – Inkaar	**Apurva Asrani, Hansal Mehta & Sameer Gautam Singh** – **Shahid**‡; Abhishek Kapoor, Chetan Bhagat, Pubali Chaudhari & Supratik Sen – Kai Po Che!; Garima Wahal–Siddharth & Sanjay Leela Bhansali – Goliyon Ki Raasleela Ram-Leela; Jaideep Sahni – Shuddh Desi Romance; Mrighdeep Singh Lamba & Vipul Vig – Fukrey; Ritesh Batra – The Lunchbox
Best Dialogue	Best Background Music
**Sameer Gautam Singh** – **Shahid**‡; Jaideep Sahni – Shuddh Desi Romance; Kunal Khemu & Sita Menon – Go Goa Gone; Prasoon Joshi – Bhaag Milkha Bhaag; Sajid-Farhad – Chennai Express	**Shankar–Ehsaan–Loy** – **Bhaag Milkha Bhaag**‡; A. R. Rahman – Raanjhanaa; Hitesh Sonik – Kai Po Che!; Monty Sharma – Goliyon Ki Raasleela Ram-Leela; Surinder Sodhi – Special 26
Best Editing	Best Cinematography
**Deepa Bhatia** – **Kai Po Che!**‡; Chandrashekhar Prajapati – Madras Cafe; Rajesh G. Pandey & Sanjay Leela Bhansali – Goliyon Ki Raasleela Ram-Leela; Raj Purohit – Sixteen; Shree Narayan Singh – Special 26	**Ravi Varman** – **Goliyon Ki Raasleela Ram-Leela**‡; Binod Pradhan – Bhaag Milkha Bhaag; Kamaljeet Negi – Madras Cafe; Natty Subramaniam & Vishal Sinha – Raanjhanaa; Pankaj Kumar – Ship of Theseus; Sudeep Chatterjee – Dhoom 3
Best Production Design	Best Visual Effects
**Wasiq Khan** – **Goliyon Ki Raasleela Ram-Leela**‡; Acropolis – Rajnish Hedao, Snigdha Basu & Sumit Basu – Dhoom 3; Sonal Sawant – Kai Po Che!; Vinod Kumar & Shubhendur Bhattacharya – Madras Cafe; Wasiq Khan – Raanjhanaa	**Red Chillies VFX** – **Krrish 3**‡; Prana Studios – Ek Thi Daayan; Reliance MediaWorks – Goliyon Ki Raasleela Ram-Leela; Tata Elxsi–VCL – Dhoom 3
Best Costume Design	Best Choreography
**Anju Modi** & **Maxima Basu** – **Goliyon Ki Raasleela Ram-Leela**‡; Anaita Shroff Adajania, Manoshi Nath & Rushi Sharma – Dhoom 3; Payal Saluja – Raanjhanaa; Subarna Ray Chaudhuri – Lootera; Varsha–Shilpa – Shuddh Desi Romance	**Remo D'Souza** – **"Badtameez Dil"** – **Yeh Jawaani Hai Deewani**‡; Arsh Tanna–Sameer Tanna – "Nagada Sang Dhol" – Goliyon Ki Raasleela Ram-Leela; Arvind Thakur, Anand Kumar, Jayesh Pradhan; Bosco–Caesar – "Tu Mere Agal Bagal Hai" – Phata Poster Nikhla Hero; Remo D'Souza & Uma–Gaiti – "Bezubaan" – ABCD: Any Body Can Dance; Vaibhavi Merchant – "Kamli" – Dhoom 3
Best Sound Design	Best Action
**Bishwadeep Chatterjee** – **Madras Cafe**‡; Arun Nambiar – Raanjhanaa; Babylon Fonseca – Kai Po Che!; Debasish Mishra & Ganesh Gangadharan – Dhoom 3; Kunal Mehta & Parikshit Lalwani – Goliyon Ki Raasleela Ram-Leela	**Manohar Verma** – **Madras Cafe**‡; Conrad Palmisano & Sham Kaushal – Dhoom 3; Franz Spilhaus – Commando: A One Man Army; Sham Kaushal & Tony Ching – Krrish 3; Tinu Verma – Shootout at Wadala

=== Popular Choice Awards ===
Best Actor	Best Actress
**Shahrukh Khan** – **Chennai Express**‡; Aamir Khan – Dhoom 3; Akshay Kumar – Boss, Once Upon ay Time in Mumbai Dobaara! & Special 26; Aditya Roy Kapur – Aashiqui 2; Dhanush – Raanjhanaa; Farhan Akhtar – Bhaag Milkha Bhaag; Hrithik Roshan – Krrish 3; John Abraham – Madras Cafe, Race 2 & Shootout at Wadala; Ranbir Kapoor – Yeh Jawaani Hai Deewani; Ranveer Singh – Goliyon Ki Raasleela Ram-Leela; Saif Ali Khan – Race 2; Shahid Kapoor – R... Rajkumar	**Deepika Padukone** – **Chennai Express, Goliyon Ki Raasleela Ram-Leela, Race 2 & Yeh Jawaani Hai Deewani**‡; Katrina Kaif – Dhoom 3; Kangana Ranaut – Krrish 3 & Shootout at Wadala; Parineeti Chopra – Shuddh Desi Romance; Priyanka Chopra – Krrish 3; Shraddha Kapoor – Aashiqui 2; Shruti Haasan – D-Day; Sonam Kapoor – Raanjhanaa; Sonakshi Sinha – Lootera & R... Rajkumar

=== Special awards ===
Lifetime Achievement	Life OK Screen Hero Award
**Amitabh Bachchan**	**Deepika Padukone**
Special Jury Award for Best Film	Ramnath Goenka Memorial Award
**Ship Of Theseus**	**Madras Cafe**
Outstanding Contribution to Indian Cinema
**Ronnie Screwvala**

== Superlatives ==
Multiple nominations
Nominations	Film
16	Goliyon Ki Raasleela Ram-Leela
13	Kai Po Che!
12	Dhoom 3
11	Bhaag Milkha Bhaag
11	Raanjhanaa
11	Yeh Jawaani Hai Deewani
9	Madras Cafe
8	Krrish 3
7	Shuddh Desi Romance
7	The Lunchbox
6	Aashiqui 2
6	Chennai Express
5	Ek Thi Daayan
5	Fukrey
5	Shahid
5	Sixteen
4	Lootera
4	Ship of Theseus
4	Special 26
3	B.A. Pass
3	Club 60
3	D-Day
3	Jolly LLB
3	Race 2
3	Shootout at Wadala
2	Commando: A One Man Army
2	Go Goa Gone
2	Inkaar
2	R... Rajkumar

Multiple wins
Awards	Film
5	Goliyon Ki Raasleela Ram-Leela
4	Bhaag Milkha Bhaag
4	Madras Cafe
3	Chennai Express
3	Kai Po Che!
3	Yeh Jawaani Hai Deewani
2	Aashiqui 2
2	B.A. Pass
2	Shahid
2	Ship of Theseus
