= List of accolades received by Once Upon a Time in Mumbaai =

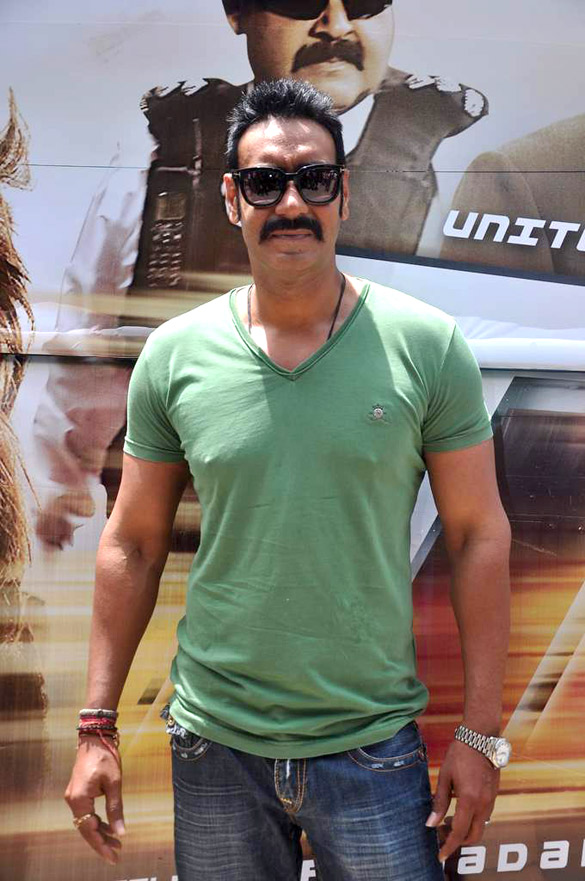
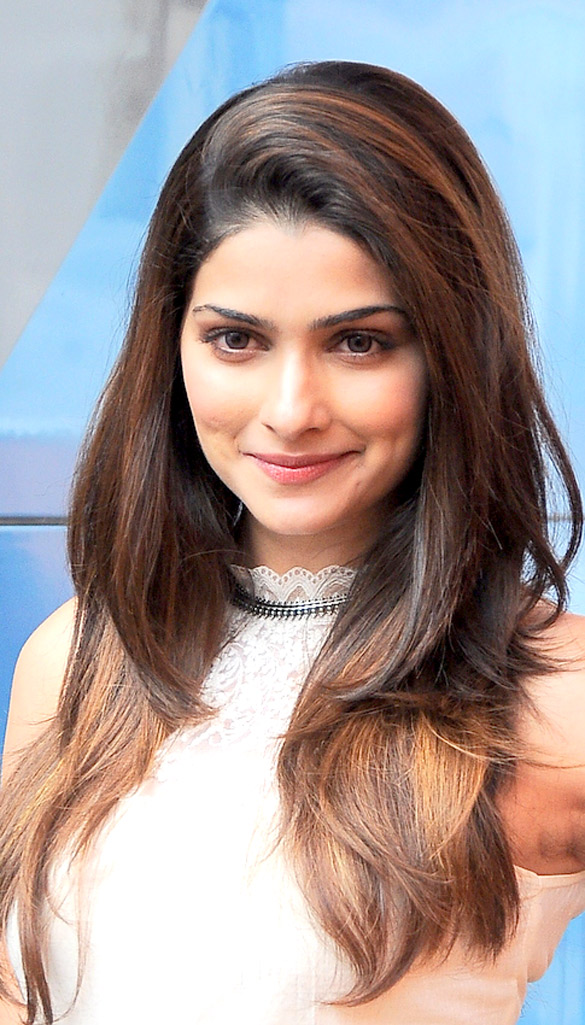
- Devgan (top) and Desai (bottom) as Sultan Mirza and Mumtaz respectively in Once Upon a Time in Mumbaai have garnered their several awards and nominations.
Accolades
Award	Won	Nominated
BIG Star Entertainment Awards	0	7
Filmfare Awards	0	5
Global Indian Music Academy Awards	5	9
International Indian Film Academy Awards	1	12
Kalakar Awards	1	1
Lions Gold Awards	3	3
Mirchi Music Awards	1	6
Producers Guild Film Awards	2	17
Screen Awards	1	11
Stardust Awards	3	8
Zee Cine Awards	5	18
- Total number of awards and nominations (Note: Awards in certain categories do not have prior nominations and only winners are announced by the jury. For simplification and to avoid errors, each award in this list has been presumed to have had a prior nomination.)
Totals	22	97
- References

Once Upon a Time in Mumbaai is a 2010 Indian Hindi-language gangster film written by Rajat Arora and directed by Milan Luthria. It stars Ajay Devgan, Emraan Hashmi, Kangana Ranaut, Prachi Desai and Randeep Hooda. Produced by Ekta Kapoor under the Balaji Motion Pictures banner, Once Upon A Time in Mumbaai was released on 30 July 2010 to generally positive reviews from critics, and was a box office success. The film is loosely based on the lives of Mumbai underworld gangsters Haji Mastan and Dawood Ibrahim.

Produced on a budget of ₹350 million, Once Upon a Time in Mumbaai was released on 30 July 2010 and grossed ₹851.78 million.

== Awards and nominations ==
Award (Note: Awards, festivals and organizations are in Alphabetical order.)	Date of ceremony (Note: Date is linked to the article about the awards held that year, wherever possible.)	Category	Recipient(s)	Result	Ref.
BIG Star Entertainment Awards	21 December 2010	Most Entertaining Film	Ekta Kapoor & Shobha Kapoor	Nominated	
BIG Star Entertainment Awards	21 December 2010	Most Entertaining Director	Milan Luthria	Nominated	
BIG Star Entertainment Awards	21 December 2010	Most Entertaining Film Actor - Male	Ajay Devgn	Nominated	
BIG Star Entertainment Awards	21 December 2010	Most Entertaining Music	Pritam	Nominated	
BIG Star Entertainment Awards	21 December 2010	Most Entertaining Singer – Male	Mohit Chauhan ("Pee Loon")	Nominated	
BIG Star Entertainment Awards	21 December 2010	Most Entertaining Singer – Female	Tulsi Kumar ("Tum Jo Aaye")	Nominated	
BIG Star Entertainment Awards	21 December 2010	Most Entertaining Song	"Pee Loon"	Nominated	
Filmfare Awards	29 January 2011	Best Director	Milan Luthria	Nominated	
Filmfare Awards	29 January 2011	Best Actor	Ajay Devgn	Nominated	
Filmfare Awards	29 January 2011	Best Supporting Actor	Emraan Hashmi	Nominated	
Filmfare Awards	29 January 2011	Best Supporting Actress	Prachi Desai	Nominated	
Filmfare Awards	29 January 2011	Best Music Director	Pritam	Nominated	
Filmfare Awards	29 January 2011	Best Male Playback Singer	Mohit Chauhan ("Pee Loon")	Nominated	
Global Indian Music Academy Awards	30 October 2011	Best Film Album	Once Upon a Time in Mumbaai	Nominated	
Global Indian Music Academy Awards	30 October 2011	Best Music Director	Pritam	Nominated	
Global Indian Music Academy Awards	30 October 2011	Best Background Score	Sandeep Shirodkar	Nominated	
Global Indian Music Academy Awards	30 October 2011	Best Lyricist	Irshad Kamil ("Pee Loon")	Won	
Global Indian Music Academy Awards	30 October 2011	Best Male Playback Singer	Mohit Chauhan ("Pee Loon")	Won	
Global Indian Music Academy Awards	30 October 2011	Best Music Arranger and Programmer	Sandeep Shirodkar ("Pee Loon")	Won	
Global Indian Music Academy Awards	30 October 2011	Best Engineer – Film Album	Eric Pillai	Nominated	
Global Indian Music Academy Awards	30 October 2011	Best Film Song	"Pee Loon"	Won	
Global Indian Music Academy Awards	30 October 2011	MTV Hot Pick of The Year	"Tum Jo Aaye"	Won	
International Indian Film Academy Awards	23–25 June 2011	Best Film	Balaji Motion Pictures	Nominated	
International Indian Film Academy Awards	23–25 June 2011	Best Director	Milan Luthria	Nominated	
International Indian Film Academy Awards	23–25 June 2011	Best Story	Rajat Arora	Nominated	
International Indian Film Academy Awards	23–25 June 2011	Best Screenplay	Rajat Arora	Nominated	
International Indian Film Academy Awards	23–25 June 2011	Best Dialogue	Rajat Arora	Nominated	
International Indian Film Academy Awards	23–25 June 2011	Best Actor	Ajay Devgn	Nominated	
International Indian Film Academy Awards	23–25 June 2011	Best Supporting Actor	Emraan Hashmi	Nominated	
International Indian Film Academy Awards	23–25 June 2011	Best Performance in a Negative Role	Emraan Hashmi	Nominated	
International Indian Film Academy Awards	23–25 June 2011	Best Supporting Actress	Prachi Desai	Won	
International Indian Film Academy Awards	23–25 June 2011	Best Music Director	Pritam	Nominated	
International Indian Film Academy Awards	23–25 June 2011	Best Lyricist	Irshad Kamil ("Pee Loon")	Nominated	
International Indian Film Academy Awards	23–25 June 2011	Best Male Playback Singer	Mohit Chauhan ("Pee Loon")	Nominated	
Kalakar Awards	4 November 2010	Best Supporting Actress	Prachi Desai	Won	
Lions Gold Awards	11 January 2011	Favorite Actor Male - Film	Ajay Devgn	Won	
Lions Gold Awards	11 January 2011	Favorite Supporting Actor Male - Film	Randeep Hooda	Won	
Lions Gold Awards	11 January 2011	Favorite Supporting Actor Female - Film	Prachi Desai	Won	
Mirchi Music Awards	27 January 2011	Album of The Year	Pritam, Irshad Kamil, Neelesh Misra & Amitabh Bhattacharya	Nominated	
Mirchi Music Awards	27 January 2011	Music Composer of The Year	Pritam	Nominated	
Mirchi Music Awards	27 January 2011	Male Vocalist of The Year	Mohit Chauhan ("Pee Loon")	Nominated	
Mirchi Music Awards	27 January 2011	Raag-Inspired Song of the Year	"Tum Jo Aaye"	Nominated	
Mirchi Music Awards	27 January 2011	Best Item Song of the Year	"Parda Parda"	Nominated	
Mirchi Music Awards	27 January 2011	Listeners' Choice Album of the Year	Once Upon a Time in Mumbaai	Won	
Producers Guild Film Awards (Note: Previously known as Apsara Film & Television Producers Guild Awards.)	11 January 2011	Best Film	Balaji Motion Pictures	Nominated	
Producers Guild Film Awards	11 January 2011	Best Director	Milan Luthria	Nominated	
Producers Guild Film Awards	11 January 2011	Best Screenplay	Rajat Arora	Won	
Producers Guild Film Awards	11 January 2011	Best Dialogue	Rajat Arora	Nominated	
Producers Guild Film Awards	11 January 2011	Best Art Director	Nitin Chandrakant Desai	Nominated	
Producers Guild Film Awards	11 January 2011	Best Costume Design	Manoshi Nath & Rushi Sharma	Nominated	
Producers Guild Film Awards	11 January 2011	Best Cinematography	Aseem Mishra	Nominated	
Producers Guild Film Awards	11 January 2011	Best Actor in a Leading Role	Ajay Devgn	Nominated	
Producers Guild Film Awards	11 January 2011	Best Actor in a Supporting Role	Emraan Hashmi	Nominated	
Producers Guild Film Awards	11 January 2011	Best Actor in a Negative Role	Emraan Hashmi	Nominated	
Producers Guild Film Awards	11 January 2011	Best Actress in a Supporting Role	Prachi Desai	Won	
Producers Guild Film Awards	11 January 2011	Best Music Director	Pritam	Nominated	
Producers Guild Film Awards	11 January 2011	Best Lyricist	Irshad Kamil ("Pee Loon")	Nominated	
Producers Guild Film Awards	11 January 2011	Best Male Playback Singer	Mohit Chauhan ("Pee Loon")	Nominated	
Producers Guild Film Awards	11 January 2011	Best Female Playback Singer	Tulsi Kumar ("Tum Jo Aaye")	Nominated	
Producers Guild Film Awards	11 January 2011	Best Choreography	Raju Khan ("Parda Parda")	Nominated	
Producers Guild Film Awards	11 January 2011	Best Sound Recording	Subhash Sahoo	Nominated	
Screen Awards	6 January 2011	Best Film	Once Upon A Time In Mumbaai	Nominated	
Screen Awards	6 January 2011	Best Director	Milan Luthria	Nominated	
Screen Awards	6 January 2011	Best Cinematography	Aseem Mishra	Nominated	
Screen Awards	6 January 2011	Best Actor	Ajay Devgn	Nominated	
Screen Awards	6 January 2011	Best Actor in a Negative Role	Emraan Hashmi	Nominated	
Screen Awards	6 January 2011	Best Supporting Actress	Prachi Desai	Nominated	
Screen Awards	6 January 2011	Best Music Director	Pritam	Nominated	
Screen Awards	6 January 2011	Most Popular Music	Pritam	Won	
Screen Awards	6 January 2011	Best Lyricist	Irshad Kamil ("Pee Loon")	Nominated	
Screen Awards	6 January 2011	Best Male Playback Singer	Mohit Chauhan ("Pee Loon")	Nominated	
Screen Awards	6 January 2011	Best Sound Design	Subhash Sahoo	Nominated	
Stardust Awards	6 February 2011	Best Film – Thriller or Action	Once Upon A Time In Mumbaai	Won	
Stardust Awards	6 February 2011	Best Director – Thriller or Action	Milan Luthria	Nominated	
Stardust Awards	6 February 2011	Dream Director	Milan Luthria	Nominated	
Stardust Awards	6 February 2011	Best Actor in a Thriller or Action	Ajay Devgn	Won	
Stardust Awards	6 February 2011	Actor of the Year – Male	Ajay Devgn	Nominated	
Stardust Awards	6 February 2011	Best Actress in a Thriller or Action	Kangana Ranaut	Nominated	
Stardust Awards	6 February 2011	Best Actor In An Ensemble Cast	Emraan Hashmi	Nominated	
Stardust Awards	6 February 2011	Best Actress In An Ensemble Cast	Prachi Desai	Won	
Zee Cine Awards	14 January 2011	Best Film	Once Upon A Time In Mumbaai	Nominated	
Zee Cine Awards	14 January 2011	Best Director	Milan Luthria	Nominated	
Zee Cine Awards	14 January 2011	Best Story	Rajat Arora	Nominated	
Zee Cine Awards	14 January 2011	Best Dialogue	Rajat Arora	Won	
Zee Cine Awards	14 January 2011	Best Cinematography	Aseem Mishra	Nominated	
Zee Cine Awards	14 January 2011	Best Actor – Male	Ajay Devgn	Nominated	
Zee Cine Awards	14 January 2011	Critics Award for Best Actor – Male	Ajay Devgn	Won	
Zee Cine Awards	14 January 2011	Best Actor in a Supporting Role – Male	Emraan Hashmi	Nominated	
Zee Cine Awards	14 January 2011	Best Actor in a Supporting Role – Female	Kangana Ranaut	Nominated	
Zee Cine Awards	14 January 2011	Best Actor in a Supporting Role – Female	Prachi Desai	Won	
Zee Cine Awards	14 January 2011	Best Music Director	Pritam	Nominated	
Zee Cine Awards	14 January 2011	Best Lyricist	Irshad Kamil ("Pee Loon")	Nominated	
Zee Cine Awards	14 January 2011	Best Lyricist	Irshad Kamil ("Tum Jo Aaye")	Nominated	
Zee Cine Awards	14 January 2011	Best Playback Singer – Male	Mohit Chauhan ("Pee Loon")	Won	
Zee Cine Awards	14 January 2011	Best Playback Singer – Female	Tulsi Kumar ("Tum Jo Aaye")	Nominated	
Zee Cine Awards	14 January 2011	Best Editing	Akiv Ali	Nominated	
Zee Cine Awards	14 January 2011	Best Track of the Year	"Pee Loon"	Won	
Zee Cine Awards	14 January 2011	Sa Re Ga Ma Pa – Song of the Year	"Pee Loon"	Nominated	

== See also ==
- List of Bollywood films of 2010
