= Maxima Basu =

Indian fashion designer, actress and director

Maxima Basu is an Indian fashion designer, actress and director. She was the assistant director of Oscar-winning film Slumdog Millionaire (2009). She has designed for popular Bollywood films like Ram Leela (2013), Bajirao Mastani (2015) and Dangal (2017), which became the highest grossing Indian film of all time, replacing senior designers Rushi Sharma and Manoshi Nath. She won the Filmfare Award for Best Costume Design in 2016 for Bajirao Mastani. She worked in Bajirao Mastani and Ram Leela as a team with designer Anju Modi, both shared 4 wins and 2 nominations jointly. Later, Maxima worked alone for Dangal.

== Personal life and education ==
Maxima is named after Russian novelist Maxim Gorky. She belongs to a Bengali-speaking Basu family residing in Delhi. She is an Alumna of Kalindi College, Delhi University.

After her first marriage ended in a divorce, she married her second husband Prashant in an intimate Hindu wedding ceremony held in Kanpur. The couple met on a film set, where Prashant worked as an Art Assistant.

== Career ==
She made her debut with Slumdog Millionaire (2009), in which she designed costumes and assisted Danny Boyle, who earned the Academy Award for Best Director for the film. Later, she switched to designing costumes with 2013 blockbuster Goliyon Ki Raasleela Ram-Leela. Director Sanjay Leela Bhansali gave her the chance. He later repeated her for his next venture Bajirao Mastani. She was applauded nationally. Sanjay, Priyanka Chopra, Deepika Padukone and Ranveer Singh was all in praise for her dresses on their characters. She earned the Filmfare Award for Best Costume Design in 2016 for the film. In 2017, she worked in two films : Bank Chor and Dangal, the latter being the highest grossing Indian film of all time. In 2017, popular designers Manoshi Nath and Rushi Sharma were scheduled to design dresses for Dangal, the highest grossing Indian film of all time. But co-producer Aamir Khan replaced them with her, giving the reason that they charged too much money for the film's budget. The film earned her second Filmfare Nomination.

== Filmography ==
=== Costume Designer ===
- Laal Singh Chaddha (2022)
- Eclipse (TV series) (2021)
- Laal Kaptaan (2019)
- The Elder One (2019)
- Kalank (2019)
- Raazi (2018)
- Padmaavat (2018)
- Bank Chor (2017)
- Raabta (2017)
- Dangal (2016)
- Bajirao Mastani (2015)
- Goliyon Ki Raasleela Ram-Leela (2013)
- Peepli (Live) (2010)

=== Actress ===
- Ship of Theseus (Nurse) -- 2012
- Peepli (Live) (TV reporter) -- 2010

=== 1st Unit Director/Assistant Director ===
- Ship of Theseus (Segment - Aida's Story)

=== Miscellaneous ===
- Slumdog Millionaire (Assistant : Director)

== Awards ==
Year	Award	Nominated work	Result
2014	Apsara Award for Best Costume Design	Goliyon Ki Raasleela Ram-Leela	Won
2014	IBN Live Movie Award for Best Costume Design	Goliyon Ki Raasleela Ram-Leela	Won
2014	Screen Weekly Award for Best Costume Design	Goliyon Ki Raasleela Ram-Leela	Won
2014	Filmfare Award for Best Costume Design	Goliyon Ki Raasleela Ram-Leela	Nominated
2016	Filmfare Award for Best Costume Design	Bajirao Mastani	Won
2016	Asian Film Award for Best Costume Design	Bajirao Mastani	Nominated
2018	Filmfare Award for Best Costume Design	Dangal	Nominated
2020	Filmfare Award for Best Costume Design	Laal Kaptaan	Nominated
