= Vaishali Menon =

Vaishali Menon is an Indian costume designer and actress who designed for Firaaq (2009) and Unfreedom (2014). She acted in Suno Na... Ek Nanhi Aawaz (2009). She received the Filmfare Award for Best Costume Design in 2010 for Firaaq.

== Filmography ==
=== Costume Designer ===
- Kiss Kis Ko (2004)
- Firaaq (2009)
- Unfreedom (2014)

=== Actress ===
- Suno Na.. Ek Nanhi Aawaz (2009) as Pre-natal course wife

== Awards ==
Year	Award	Film	Result
2010	Filmfare Award for Best Costume Design	Firaaq	Won
