= Filmfare Award for Best Costume Design =

Indian annual film award

- Awarded for: Best Performance by a Costume Designer
- Country: India
- Presented by: Filmfare
- First award: Manish Malhotra, Rangeela (1995)
- Currently held by: Darshan Jalan; Laapataa Ladies (2025)
- Website: Filmfare Awards

The Filmfare Award for Best Costume Design is given by the Filmfare magazine as part of its annual Filmfare Awards for Hindi films.

Dolly Ahluwalia holds a record three wins in this category.

== Multiple wins ==
Wins	Costume Designer
3	Dolly Ahluwalia
2	Manoshi Nath & Rushi Sharma, Veera Kapur EE, Sheetal Sharma, Nidhi Gambhir & Divya Gambhir

== Awards ==
Here is a list of the award winners and the films for which they won.

Year	Movie	Designer
2025	Laapataa Ladies	Darshan Jalan
2024	Sam Bahadur	Sachin Lovelekar, Divvya Gambhir, and Nidhhi Gambhir
2023	Gangubai Kathiawadi	Sheetal Sharma
2022	Sardar Udham	Veera Kapur EE
2021	Gulabo Sitabo	Veera Kapur EE
2020	Sonchiriya	Nidhi Gambhir, Divya Gambhir
2019	Manto	Sheetal Sharma
2018	A Death in the Gunj	Rohit Chaturvedi
2017	Udta Punjab	Payal Saluja
2016	Bajirao Mastani	Anju Modi, Maxima Basu
2015	Haider	Dolly Ahluwalia
2014	Bhaag Milkha Bhaag	Dolly Ahluwalia
2013	Shanghai	Manoshi Nath, Rushi Sharma
2012	The Dirty Picture	Niharika Khan
2011	Do Dooni Chaar	Varsha Shilpa
2010	Firaaq	Vaishali Menon
2009	Oye Lucky! Lucky Oye!	Manoshi Nath, Rushi Sharma
2008	Gandhi, My Father	Sujata Sharma
2007	Omkara	Dolly Ahluwalia
1995	Rangeela	Manish Malhotra

== See also ==
- Filmfare Awards
- Bollywood
- Cinema of India
