= Urmi Juvekar =

Indian screenwriter and filmmaker

- Born: Mumbai, India
- Occupations: Writer, Director, Producer, Actress
- Years active: 1997–present

Urmi Juvekar is an Indian screenwriter and documentary filmmaker best known for writing the screenplays of Oye Lucky! Lucky Oye! (2008), I Am (2010) and Shanghai (2012).

== Early life ==
She pursued a bachelor's degree in Social Work from Mumbai University. Post her graduation, she landed her first job with the Xavier's Institute of Communication at St. Xavier's College, Mumbai.

== Career ==
Urmi began her career in the entertainment industry as a documentary-film writer and director. With the film Darmiyaan: In Between (1997), directed by Kalpana Lajmi, Urmi made her feature film screenwriting debut. She also made a short film, The Shillong Chamber Choir, based on an Indian chamber choir formed in 2001, popularly known by the name Shillong Chamber Choir. Since then, she has written several acclaimed Indian feature films including Shararat (2002), Rules: Pyaar Ka Superhit Formula (2003), Oye Lucky! Lucky Oye! (2008) and I Am (2010), most popularly credited with writing the screenplay for the film Shanghai, which released in 2012 to wide critical and commercial success. Urmi has most recently written the screenplay for the upcoming release Detective Byomkesh Bakshy!, an Indian crime thriller film directed by Dibakar Banerjee and co-produced by Yash Raj Films and Dibakar Banerjee Productions.

== Filmography ==
Film	Year	Credits
Leila	2019	Creator
Detective Byomkesh Bakshy!	2015	Screenwriter
Shanghai	2012	Screenwriter
Love Sex aur Dhokha	2010	Creative Producer
I Am	2010	Screenwriter, Dialogue Writer
Oye Lucky! Lucky Oye!	2008	Screenwriter
Rules: Pyaar Ka Superhit Formula	2003	Screenwriter
Shararat	2002	Story
