= Detective Byomkesh Bakshy! =

2015 Indian film by Dibakar Banerjee

- Theatrical release poster
- Directed by: Dibakar Banerjee
- Written by: Sharadindu Bandyopadhyay; Dibakar Banerjee
- Screenplay by: Dibakar Banerjee; Urmi Juvekar
- Based on: Satyanweshi and Arthamanartham by Sharadindu Bandyopadhyay
- Produced by: Aditya Chopra; Dibakar Banerjee
- Starring: Sushant Singh Rajput; Anand Tiwari; Swastika Mukherjee
- Cinematography: Nikos Andritsakis
- Edited by: Manas Mittal; Namrata Rao
- Music by: Various Artists
- Production companies: Yash Raj Films; Dibakar Banerjee Productions
- Distributed by: Yash Raj Films
- Release date: 3 April 2015
- Running time: 147 minutes
- Country: India
- Language: Hindi
- Budget: ₹35 crore
- Box office: ₹46.8 crore

Detective Byomkesh Bakshy! is a 2015 Indian Hindi-language period mystery thriller film directed by Dibakar Banerjee, who co-produced with Aditya Chopra under Yash Raj Films and Dibakar Banerjee Productions. The film, which is based on the fictional detective Byomkesh Bakshi, stars Sushant Singh Rajput, alongside Anand Tiwari, Neeraj Kabi, Swastika Mukherjee and Meiyang Chang.

Detective Byomkesh Bakshy! was released on 3 April 2015 to positive reviews from critics and became a box office success. A sequel with Sushant Singh Rajput reprising his role was planned, but the film was shelved after his death.

== Plot ==
In November 1942, shortly after the Japanese take over Burma, a group of Chinese men from the Green Gang are unloading opium in Calcutta. They are suddenly ambushed and their leader gets brutally blinded by a mysterious figure. Three months later, the leader decides to return to Calcutta to investigate their missing opium.

Meanwhile, Ajit Kumar Banerjee takes help from Byomkesh Bakshi to find his missing father Bhuvan Banerjee. Byomkesh initially rejects the request, but decides to investigate after his lover marries someone else. The following day, Byomkesh visits the lodging house Bhuvan resided in, headed by Dr. Anukul Guha, and takes a room to investigate. Byomkesh finds Bhuvan's paan box with Ashwini Babu, Bhuvan's roommate, and deduces that he was murdered. Byomkesh visits the closed chemical factory where Bhuvan used to work earlier and meets Anguri Devi, an actress and a close accomplice of the factory's owner Gajanan Sikdaar. Byomkesh finds some letters with Anguri Devi and deduces that Bhuvan was blackmailing Sikdaar, who might have killed Bhuvan and hid his body in the factory.

Byomkesh and Dr. Guha return to the factory and find Bhuvan's body in a machine, causing Deputy Commissioner Wilkie to question Sikdaar. However, Byomkesh discovers the letters are falsely backdated and saves Sikdaar from being framed. Byomkesh follows him home, but is stopped by Anguri Devi, who attempts to seduce him. Byomkesh meets Sikdaar, who immediately has a fit and passes away, having been poisoned. Suspicion falls on Sukumar, who was seen making death threats to Sikdaar. Dr. Guha leaves Calcutta temporarily, but sends Byomkesh a stamp, confirming he had faked the letters and killed Bhuvan. Satyavati, Sukumar's sister, pleads with Byomkesh to help her brother, who she believes is innocent and in hiding. Byomkesh finds the cab Sukumar was last seen in, and the driver directs him to the office of Dr. Watanabe, a Japanese dentist. Byomkesh and Ajit meet Watanabe, saying that they are volunteers for Sukumar's Basant Panchami agitation, but Watanabe suspects them and sends a real volunteer to follow them. Having observed this, Byomkesh and Ajit disguise themselves before following the volunteer back to Watanabe's office. Discovering the ruse, Watanabe kills the volunteer and his receptionist before escaping. The two enter his office and see their corpses, where Byomkesh finds a drawing in the volunteer's pocket.

Returning to the lodge, Byomkesh and Ajit meet Dr. Guha, who admits that he and Sukumar are working with the Japanese to free the country, with Sukumar to lead a Free Bengal, and killed Bhuvan and Sikdaar for betraying them. Returning to their room, Ajit vents about his father, revealing Bhuvan had lost his job at Hind Chemicals when they learned his master formula contained opium and addicted customers. Realising Ashwini is addicted to Bhuvan's custom paan blend, Byomkesh takes a chew and euphorically creates a mural of his understanding of the entire case, revealing Sikdaar said the words Young Gun to him before dying. The next morning, Byomkesh tests the mixture and his own blood; while his blood contains heroin, the paan is clean, making him deduce that Bhuvan had created an "untraceable" formula. Byomkesh learns from Kanai Dao, a fellow lodge resident and licensed opium dealer, that the opium supply in the local areas has been halted, and asks him if he can help Byomkesh meet any heroin suppliers. However, Kanai turns out to be a police informer and turns Byomkesh and Ajit to Wilkie, who tells Byomkesh about Yang Guang, a former Green Gang leader who wanted Calcutta's opium business for himself, and was killed in retaliation, but reportedly survived; Byomkesh realises Sikdaar was referring to him about Yang Guang.

Byomkesh discovers the drawing actually depicts the course of the Ganges through Calcutta and Sukumar's campaign points. With Kanai's help, Byomkesh meets with the Green Gang, where they realise Yang had set a deal with the Japanese to use opium smuggling routes to invade Calcutta by surprise on Basant Panchami, in turn giving Yang control over the city's drug trade. Byomkesh realizes that Anguri Devi is Yang's lover, whom she has not met in 4 years, and she had killed Sikdaar and attempted to seduce Byomkesh on his orders while being unaware of Yang's deal with the Japanese. With the attack scheduled for the next day, Byomkesh meets Wilkie and requests him to set off all air raid sirens at 4 AM, but Wilkie refuses, and Kanai defects to Byomkesh for saving him from the Green Gang. Byomkesh requests Dr. Guha, Satyavati, Sukumar and Dr. Watanabe to meet him at the lodge, pretending to have joined them and claiming they have been betrayed. At the lodge, Byomkesh reveals Dr. Guha is Yang Guang, conned the idealistic Sukumar into his deal, and plans to make Calcutta as the drug capital of the world. Byomkesh states that he informed the authorities about the landing points, but Yang claims that he is bluffing. Anguri Devi attempts to dissuade Yang, nearly shooting him, but he shows affection to draw her in before stabbing her. The air raid sirens are set off; using this, Byomkesh convinces Watanabe to leave and stop the attack to save his men. The Green Gang, having secretly observed the proceedings with Kanai's help, attack Yang.

Byomkesh informs a panicking Satyavati that he was indeed bluffing before being struck unconscious in the chaos. Byomkesh regains consciousness, where he is told by Ajit that the Green Gang has taken Yang. Byomkesh asks Satyavati to marry him, to which she smiles in reply. The Green Gang's leader orders his son to blind Yang in revenge at an abandoned factory, but Yang purposely blinds himself with the poker to turn the tables and kill the gang, where he plans the same for Byomkesh. As the factory siren rings, Byomkesh realises something is amiss.

== Cast ==
- Sushant Singh Rajput as Byomkesh Bakshi
- Anand Tiwari as Ajit Kumar Banerjee
- Neeraj Kabi as Dr. Anukul Guha/Yang Guang
- Divya Menon as Satyavati
- Swastika Mukherjee as Anguri Devi
- Meiyang Chang as Kanai Dao
- Moumita Chakraborty as Leela
- Mark Bennington as Deputy Commissioner Wilkie
- Arindol Bagchi as Ashwini Babu
- Aryann Bhowmik as Young Revolutionary
- Manoshi Nath as Ruby
- Lauren Gottlieb (special appearance in the song "Calcutta Kiss")

== Production ==
=== Development ===
Dibakar Banerjee expressed his desire to make a film on Byomkesh Bakshi so that India will get its own detective. On 28 June 2013, the co-production venture of YRF and Dibakar Banerjee Productions officially announces its first directorial outing with Dibakar Banerjee titled Detective Byomkesh Bakshy! In July 2013, Dibakar Banerjee revealed that YRF had bought the rights of "31 of Byomkesh novels in all languages outside Bangla".

Before shooting, workshops were held for the cast. In an interview Rajput said, "I have taken leave for two to three months for Detective Byomkesh Bakshy! after the release of Shuddh Desi Romance. A lot has to be done for the film like the look of the 1940s' hairstyle, body, accent, but all after this film". The costume was designed by the designer Manish Malhotra.

The sets were designed by Vandana Kataria and, accordingly, the set up showcased the lifestyle of the people who lived during the turbulent times of World War II. To give the look of 1943, the heritage zone of B. B. D. Bagh was transported back to the pre-Independence era with vintage cars and old trams back on the streets. As reports suggest, a lot of VFX was used to reflect old world charm.

=== Casting ===
After Khosla Ka Ghosla, Dibakar Banerjee wanted to make this film and he approached Aamir Khan to play the antagonist. Eventually the deal was cancelled as Aamir chose Dhoom 3 over it. Sushant Singh Rajput was roped in to play the role of Byomkesh Bakshi in mid-2013. Earlier reports suggested that fashion designer Sabyasachi's assistant, Divya Menon, would be making her debut as an actress in this film as Rajput's character's wife.

Rani Mukerji was considered to play the female lead. However, Rani refused the role since the heroine's character had a few bold scenes. The role was later offered to Bengali actress Swastika Mukherjee. On 6 November 2014, Banerjee stated that Mukherjee's role is sketched along the lines of Mata Hari. In March 2014, reports suggested that Meiyang Chang would be seen in the film in an important role. In May 2014, it was revealed that Neeraj Kabi is also part of the film.

=== Filming ===
Shooting for the film began in early 2014, and ended on 12 May 2014. A part of the movie was shot in Kolkata and Mumbai. Some scenes were shot in an abandoned mill in Mumbai's Byculla region. Shooting locations in Kolkata were finalised in February 2012. Shooting took place in Lalbazar, Presidency University, Coffee House and Bow Barracks. The cast was reportedly seen shooting for the film in Agarpara in January 2014.

== Music ==
Detective Byomkesh Bakshy!

Soundtrack album by Various artists
- Released: 14 March 2015
- Genre: Feature film soundtrack
- Length: 26:57
- Label: Yash Raj Music
External audio
- Audio Jukebox on YouTube

Amongst the artists in the album, Sneha Khanwalkar is the only musician who had composed a soundtrack before this. The track used in the teaser, titled "Life's a Bitch", was composed by the New Delhi band Joint Family. The full song of "Bach Ke Bakshy" was published in a music video featuring Sushant, dancing in a parking lot, on 16 March 2015 in the official YRF YouTube channel. The next day, YRF uploaded all the songs in an audio jukebox format.

Track listing
No.	Title	Lyrics	Music	Singer(s)	Length
1.	"Calcutta Kiss"	Madboy/Mink	Madboy/Mink	Imaad Shah, Saba Azad	3:09
2.	"Bach Ke Bakshy"	Sneha Khanwalkar, Dibakar Banerjee	Sneha Khanwalkar, Dibakar Banerjee	Gowri Jayakumar, Big Deal, Thomson Andrews, Trevor Furtado, Rap by: Smokey the Ghost, Craz Professa	5:49
3.	"Byomkesh in Love"	Rishi Bradoo	Blek	Rishi Bradoo, Anil Bradoo, Usri Banerjee	3:18
4.	"Jaanam"	Suryakant Sawhney	Peter Cat Recording Co. (PCRC)	Suryakant Sawhney	3:27
5.	"Chase in Chinatown"	Sandeep Madhavan	Mode AKA	Vyshnav Balasubramaniam, Sandeep Madhavan, Manas Ullas	3:55
6.	"Life's A Bitch"	Akshay De	Joint Family	Akshay De	3:35
7.	"Yang Guang Lives"	IJA	IJA	IJA	4:29
Total length:					26:57

== Marketing and promotion ==
Banerjee says he changed the 'i' at the end of the protagonist's surname Bakshi to 'y' for "typographical balance", stating that the 'i' felt "too thin" and that 'y' was a "stronger alphabet".

A teaser trailer for the film was released on Vine and marks the first film to do so. The production team made a special documentary to celebrate the birthday of Howrah Bridge and did a flash mob on the bridge to the song "Calcutta Kiss" on that day.

Detective Byomkesh Bakshy! team promoted the film in Mumbai College, where a fashion show is inspired by it. Sushant Singh Rajput promoted the film in India Poochega Sabse Shaana Kaun? and Comedy Nights with Kapil. Rajput also promoted the film in the TV series C.I.D. on 30 March 2015, where he appeared as Byomkesh with Anand Tiwari as Ajit.

=== Products ===
A mobile version game named Detective Byomkesh Bakshy!: The Game, has been launched by Games2win (G2W), which was made available on the Google Play Store. It is a hidden objects game. The game, launched with Yash Raj Films Licensing (YRFL), the licensing division of Yash Raj Films, is based on the film, which features Sushant Singh Rajput in the lead. On completing all the levels, a 'Detective Certificate' is awarded to the players, who can post it on social media.

An apparel line titled NOIR 43 was launched at the Amazon India Fashion Week (AIFW), New Delhi, on 26 March.

== Future ==
Prior to release, Banerjee expressed interest in creating a franchise based around Byomkesh Bakshy, if the first film performed well. After its release, Banerjee stated that he had the sequel ready and was hoping to start soon. Banerjee said that Byomkesh's adventures would continue with the upcoming installments exploring his relationship with Ajit, Satyawati and his nemesis.

== Reception ==
=== Critical reception ===
Detective Byomkesh Bakshy! received critical acclaim from critics.

Rohit Vats of Hindustan Times gave 4/5 stars and wrote "It’s a film that will keep you glued to the screen for all the 135 minutes it runs into. Don’t think of even missing a minute of it." Surabhi Redkar of Koimoi gave 4/5 stars and wrote "Detective Byomkesh Bakshy is a delicious thriller filled with elements that make you rack your brains too. This mystery is the one even you would want to solve. Watch it for an amazing story and its even better execution."

Surabhi Redkar of Mid-Day gave 4/5 stars and wrote "Don't miss it. Even if just to go back to the magical world of nostalgia created so beautifully and earnestly by Banerjee and cinematographer Nikos Andritsakis." Kusumita Das from Deccan Chronicle gave 3.5/5 stars and wrote "There are two kinds of audiences for this film --- those who know Byomkesh and those who don’t. Dibakar has a revelation for both. That’s one case neatly solved."

Srijana Mitra Das of The Times of India gave 3.5/5 stars and wrote "A chilling climax masterfully ties up the tale - but 30 minutes less would've given this detective a much tighter grip. Still, DBB! is a fun watch." Shubhra Gupta of The Indian Express gave 3/5 stars and wrote "Detective Byomkesh Bakshy's biggest weakness is its leading man: Sushant Singh Rajput." IBN Live gave 3/5 stars and wrote "In the end the film has a lot going for it, even if it isn't as fully satisfying as Banerjee's previous works. This is a sprawling, ambitious effort with remarkable attention to detail; a film that deserves to be watched, especially for its masterful filmmaking."

=== Box office ===
On its first day Detective Byomkesh Bakshy! collected ₹4.2 crore (US$440,000) nett in India. On its second and third day the film collected ₹4.5 crore (US$470,000) and ₹5.36 crore (US$560,000) respectively, and made a total weekend collection of ₹14.1 crore (US$1.5 million) in India. Its worldwide collection stood at ₹34.68 crores.

== Awards ==
Year	Occasion	Award	Awardee	Result
2016	Stardust Awards	Best actor in a negative role	Neeraj Kabi	Nominated
