= Ishaqzaade =

2012 Indian film by Habib Faisal

- Theatrical release poster
- Directed by: Habib Faisal
- Written by: Habib Faisal
- Story by: Aditya Chopra; Habib Faisal
- Produced by: Aditya Chopra
- Starring: Arjun Kapoor; Parineeti Chopra
- Cinematography: Hemant Chaturvedi
- Edited by: Aarti Bajaj
- Music by: Songs: Amit Trivedi; Score: Ranjit Barot
- Production company: Yash Raj Films
- Distributed by: Yash Raj Films
- Release date: 11 May 2012
- Running time: 132 minutes
- Country: India
- Language: Hindi

Ishaqzaade (transl. Lovers) is a 2012 Indian Hindi-language romantic action film written and directed by Habib Faisal, and produced by Aditya Chopra under the Yash Raj Films banner. It stars Arjun Kapoor in his debut and Parineeti Chopra in lead roles, alongside Gauahar Khan, Natasha Rastogi, Anil Rastogi, and Shashank Khaitan in supporting roles. Set in the fictional town of Almor in Uttar Pradesh, the narrative follows Parma Chauhan and Zoya Qureshi, members of rival political families, whose passionate romance challenges deeply rooted religious and societal divides.

The film marked Kapoor’s first appearance in a leading role, and Chopra’s second following Ladies vs Ricky Bahl (2011). Principal photography took place in various locations across Uttar Pradesh, with cinematography by Hemant Chaturvedi and music composed by Amit Trivedi. The soundtrack features lyrics by Kausar Munir and includes the popular track "Pareshaan," sung by Shalmali Kholgade. The official trailer was released on 15 March 2012, followed by the film’s theatrical release on 11 May 2012.

Upon release, Ishaqzaade received positive reviews from critics, with particular praise directed toward Chopra’s performance, as well as its screenplay and music. Produced on a budget of ₹16 crore (US$2 million), the film emerged as a commercial success, grossing ₹61.3 crore (US$7.5 million) worldwide.

At the 58th Filmfare Awards, the film received four nominations, including Best Actress (Chopra) and Best Male Debut (Kapoor), winning Best Female Playback Singer for Shalmali Kholgade for the song "Pareshaan." Additionally, Chopra was awarded the National Film Award – Special Mention at the 60th National Film Awards for her performance.

== Plot ==
In the town of Almor, the Chauhans and the Qureshis are rival political families with a history of hostility. Parma Chauhan, the wayward grandson of political patriarch Surya Chauhan, struggles for validation in his family due to his reputation as a troublemaker. Zoya Qureshi, the spirited and assertive daughter of Aftab Qureshi, aspires to enter politics but is discouraged by her conservative Muslim family.

During a heated election campaign, Parma and Zoya clash repeatedly but gradually develop mutual attraction. They fall in love and elope, with Parma converting to Islam and assuming the name Parvez. After a staged marriage ceremony, the two consummate their relationship and have sex in an empty train. Parma later reveals that the wedding was a ruse designed to dishonor Zoya and avenge an earlier humiliation. Heartbroken, Zoya attempts to retaliate but is stopped by Parma's mother, Parvati, who urges her son to honor his actions. When Parvati tries to protect the couple, Surya fatally shoots her, prompting Parma to turn against his family and protect Zoya.

Forced to flee, the couple seeks refuge in a brothel managed by Chand Bibi. Although Zoya initially suspects Parma of betrayal, she begins to forgive him as he expresses remorse. They eventually reconcile and marry in a legitimate ceremony. Hoping for reconciliation, Zoya brings Parma to her home, but her father threatens to kill her. The couple escapes once again, planning to flee to Jaipur. However, their families join forces to track them down, viewing their union as a threat to both political legacies and religious boundaries.

Cornered on a college rooftop during Eid, Parma and Zoya engage in a final standoff with their pursuers. With no escape and few bullets left, they choose to shoot each other, dying in each other's arms. Their families depart, believing the matter settled. The film concludes with a message highlighting the tragic consequences faced by interfaith and intercaste couples in contemporary India.

== Cast ==
- Arjun Kapoor as Parma Chauhan
- Parineeti Chopra as Zoya Qureshi Chauhan
- Gauahar Khan as Chand Bibi
- Anil Rastogi as Surya Chauhan, Parma's grandfather
- Natasha Rastogi as Parvati Chauhan, Parma's mother
- Ratan Singh as Aftab Qureshi, Zoya's father
- Charu Rastogi as Zoya's mother
- Shashank Khaitan as Dharma Chauhan
- Ankit Kakkar as Karma Chauhan
- Aftab Ahmed Khan as Shadaab Qureshi
- Jafarpal Dhillon as Sohraab Qureshi
- Usha Bachani as a Prostitute

== Production ==
=== Casting ===
In late 2011, it was announced that Arjun Kapoor would make his acting debut in Ishaqzaade. Initially slated to debut in Virus Diwan, another Yash Raj Films project, Kapoor’s launch was realigned after that film was shelved. Ishaqzaade was developed specifically to introduce him under the Yash Raj banner. Parineeti Chopra, who had made her screen debut the previous year in Ladies vs Ricky Bahl (2011), was cast opposite Kapoor. National Film Award-winning choreographers Rekha and Chinni Prakash, known for their work in Jodhaa Akbar (2008), were brought on to choreograph the film's musical sequences. Veteran action director Sham Kaushal was responsible for staging the action scenes.

=== Filming ===
Filming began on 15 October 2011. A major part of the film was shot in Lucknow, Hardoi, Uttar Pradesh and at other sites near Lucknow.

Principal photography for Ishaqzaade commenced on 15 October 2011. A significant portion of the film was shot on location in and around Lucknow and Hardoi in the Indian state of Uttar Pradesh.

== Soundtrack ==
The music for Ishaqzaade was composed by Amit Trivedi, marking his first collaboration with Yash Raj Films. The lyrics were written by Kausar Munir, with the exception of the track "Chokra Jawaan," which was penned by the film’s writer-director, Habib Faisal. The soundtrack album, which includes remixes of "Pareshaan" and "Jhallah Wallah" by Abhijit Vaghani, was released on 13 April 2012 under the YRF Music label. The film's background score was composed by Ranjit Barot.

== Reception ==
=== Box office ===
Ishaqzaade opened to strong box office performance across India, with theatre occupancy ranging between 70% and 90% on its first day. The film collected ₹4.54 crore (US$540,000) nett on its opening day, followed by ₹5.15 crore (US$610,000) and ₹6.22 crore (US$740,000) on its second and third days, respectively. It earned ₹15.9 crore (US$1.9 million) nett over its first weekend and ₹25.7 crore (US$3.0 million) by the end of its first week.

The film broke the record for the highest first-week collections for a Hindi non-star cast film, previously held by Jaane Tu... Ya Jaane Na (2008). It continued to perform well in subsequent weeks, collecting ₹7.38 crore (US$870,000) in its second weekend and ₹12.5 crore (US$1.5 million) in its second week. The film earned an additional ₹4.34 crore (US$510,000) during its third weekend, solidifying its status as a commercial success. It concluded its theatrical run with a domestic net total of approximately ₹45.39 crore (US$5.5 million) and a worldwide gross of ₹61.3 crore (US$7.5 million) against a budget of ₹16 crore (US$2 million).

=== Critical reception ===
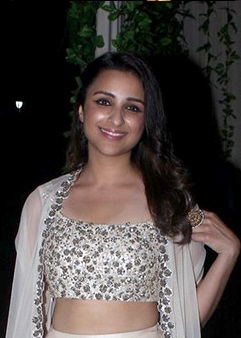
Parineeti Chopra's performance received widespread praise from critics, and she won the National Film Award – Special Mention

Ishaqzaade received positive reviews from critics, with widespread praise for Parineeti Chopra’s performance.

Taran Adarsh of Bollywood Hungama rated the film 3.5 out of 5 stars, describing it as "a volatile and intense story with ample doses of fanatical romance," and praised its performances, music, and mainstream appeal. Mrigank Dhaniwala of Koimoi also gave it 3.5 stars, noting that the film was "an entertaining fare" that relied on its strong first half and engaging performances. Khalid Mohamed of Deccan Chronicle echoed similar sentiments, calling it a film that "gets under your skin... and rocks."

Rachit Gupta of Filmfare rated the film 3 out of 5, referring to it as a "fantastic Indian adaptation of Romeo and Juliet⁣⁣," and appreciated its exploration of love as a force beyond life and death. Dainik Bhaskar awarded the film 3 stars, citing its performances, unconventional climax, and intense chemistry between the leads as highlights, though it noted that the political backdrop might be less relatable to metropolitan audiences. Shomini Sen of Zee News commended director Habib Faisal’s depiction of small-town life and its cultural nuances.

Blessy Chettiar of DNA noted that while the film had a slow start, it picked up significantly and praised Chopra’s performance as scene-stealing. Anupama Chopra appreciated the precision in the storytelling and the leads’ performances, stating that "Ishaqzaade does provide half a good time. How many films can you say that for?" Trisha Gupta of Firstpost acknowledged the film’s sharply drawn characters and Chopra’s standout performance, though she criticized the film’s ending and thematic execution.

== Accolades ==
Award	Date of the ceremony	Category	Recipients	Result	Ref.
Zee Cine Awards	6 January 2013	Best Male Debut	Arjun Kapoor	Won	
Zee Cine Awards	6 January 2013	Best Music Director	Amit Trivedi	Nominated	
Zee Cine Awards	6 January 2013	Best Lyricist	Kausar Munir (for "Pareshaan")	Won	
Zee Cine Awards	6 January 2013	Best Playback Singer – Male	Javed Ali (for "Ishaqzaade")	Nominated	
Zee Cine Awards	6 January 2013	Best Playback Singer – Female	Shalmali Kholgade (for "Pareshaan")	Nominated	
Zee Cine Awards	6 January 2013	Best Dialogue	Habib Faisal	Nominated	
Screen Awards	12 January 2013	Best Actress	Parineeti Chopra	Nominated	
Screen Awards	12 January 2013	Best Male Debut	Arjun Kapoor	Nominated	
Screen Awards	12 January 2013	Best Music Director	Amit Trivedi	Nominated	
Screen Awards	12 January 2013	Best Male Playback Singer	Javed Ali (for "Ishaqzaade")	Won	
Screen Awards	12 January 2013	Best Female Playback Singer	Shalmali Kholgade (for "Pareshaan")	Won	
Screen Awards	12 January 2013	Best Screenplay	Habib Faisal	Nominated	
Screen Awards	12 January 2013	Best Dialogue	Habib Faisal	Nominated	
Screen Awards	12 January 2013	Best Background Music	Ranjit Barot	Nominated	
Screen Awards	12 January 2013	Best Costume Design	Varsha Shilpa	Nominated	
Screen Awards	12 January 2013	Best Choreography	Chinni Prakash and Rekha Chinni Prakash (for "Jhallah Wallah")	Nominated	
Filmfare Awards	20 January 2013	Best Actress	Parineeti Chopra	Nominated	
Filmfare Awards	20 January 2013	Best Male Debut	Arjun Kapoor	Nominated	
Filmfare Awards	20 January 2013	Best Music Director	Amit Trivedi	Nominated	
Filmfare Awards	20 January 2013	Best Female Playback Singer	Shalmali Kholgade (for "Pareshaan")	Won	
Stardust Awards	26 January 2013	Superstar of Tomorrow – Male	Arjun Kapoor	Won	
Stardust Awards	26 January 2013	Superstar of Tomorrow – Female	Parineeti Chopra	Won	
Stardust Awards	26 January 2013	New Musical Sensation – Female	Shalmali Kholgade (for "Pareshaan")	Won	
Producers Guild Film Awards	16 February 2013	Best Actress in a Leading Role	Parineeti Chopra	Nominated	
Producers Guild Film Awards	16 February 2013	Best Actress in a Supporting Role	Gauahar Khan	Nominated	
Producers Guild Film Awards	16 February 2013	Best Male Debut	Arjun Kapoor	Nominated	
Producers Guild Film Awards	16 February 2013	Best Female Playback Singer	Shalmali Kholgade (for "Pareshaan")	Won	
National Film Awards	3 May 2013	Special Mention	Parineeti Chopra	Won	
IIFA Awards	4–6 July 2013	Best Female Playback Singer	Shalmali Kholgade (for "Pareshaan")	Nominated	
