= Rules: Pyaar Ka Superhit Formula =

- Directed by: Parvati Balagopalan
- Written by: Urmi Juvekar
- Produced by: Nirja Shah
- Starring: Milind Soman; Tanuja; Meera Vasudevan; Namrata Barua; Raj Zutshi
- Cinematography: Chinmaya Khatri
- Edited by: Jyotsna Murthy
- Music by: Vanraj Bhatia & Sandesh Shandilya
- Release date: 5 September 2003
- Country: India
- Language: English

Rules: Pyaar Ka Superhit Formula is a 2003 Indian Hindi-language romantic comedy film directed by Parvati Balagopalan.

== Synopsis ==
Radha (Meera Vasudevan) is with an advertising agency, and has a chance to see and meet prominent models. She meets her dream guy, Vikram Verma (Milind Soman), on one such day. Needless to say, she is madly in love with him, but he has his eyes for his girlfriend, the gorgeous model, Maggie (Namrata Barua). Radha's attempts to make him notice her are in vain, and in desperation, she confides in her grandma (Tanuja), for a solution. Her grandma, who wants Radha to get over her crush and get on with her life, instructs her to follow a number of simple rules, which will make Vikram notice her.

- Rule no. 1 - If you want him to notice you, don't pay attention to him, no matter how crazy you are about him.
- Rule no. 2 - Let him come after you!
- Rule no. 3 - Always be a surprise, never let him realize that he has fully understood you.
- Rule no. 4 - Never let him realize that he has the ability to hurt you emotionally.
- Rule no. 5 - Praise him for almost everything, so he is comfortable in saying 'I love you'

She follows all these rules and finally makes him fall in love with her. But then she realizes that she does not love him and that she forced him into loving her by following the rules. She feels very bad about what she has done, and breaks up with him. Vikram feels manipulated and is heartbroken. But as time passes, Radha realizes that she does actually love him and becomes very depressed. Time passes by, and one day Vikram visits her home when she isn't home, and ends up accidentally seeing all of his pictures that she has and realizes that she does love him. He is super thrilled and tries to win her back, but she is still depressed and keeps denying her love for him. One day while filming a movie, Radha accidentally ends up in a hot air balloon in life-threatening danger. Vikram jumps into the balloon and saves her, and they both profess their love for each other as the balloon floats away.

== Cast ==
- Tanuja as Grandmother (Dadi)
- Milind Soman as Vikram Verma
- Meera Vasudevan as Radha
- Namrata Barua as Maggie
- Rajendranath Zutshi as Uday
- Manini Mishra as Uday's wife
- Asif Basra as Aakash
- Manish Chaudhary as Aakash's partner
- Bipasha Basu as Herself (cameo appearance)

== Music ==
Music composed by Vanraj Bhatia and Sandesh Shandilya.

1. "Chhodo Na Mujhe" - Kunal Ganjawala
2. "Chhodo Na Mujhe" v2 - Kunal Ganjawala
3. "Gori Tore Nain" - Sonu Nigam
4. "Gori Tore Nain" (Remix) - Sonu Nigam
5. "Pyar Ke Naam Pe" - Neeraj Shridhar
6. "Radha's Theme"
7. "Uljhanon Ko De Diya" - K. K., Sanjeevani

== Critical response ==
Anupama Chopra of India Today wrote, "Occasionally, the film's energy flags but the performances are good - from Tanuja's wily matriarch (at one point, she checks out Soman and says, 'What a body') to Vasudevan's vulnerably attractive ingenue to Soman, who of course has a tailor-made role. Like first love, Rules feels fresh and mostly fun." Ashish Magotra of Rediff.com gave a positive review, writing, "It is filled with small, lovely moments that make you laugh, cry and share every emotion with the actors onscreen."

Conversely, Taran Adarsh of IndiaFM gave the film 2 out of 5, writing, "RULES: PYAAR KA SUPERHIT FORMULA is a feel good entertainer with a refreshing storyline, but an ordinary screenplay, coupled with some illogical turn of events, take it downhill."
