= Manoshi Nath =

Indian costume designer

Manoshi Nath is an Indian costume designer. Manoshi and her creative partner, Rushi Sharma co-founded Fools’ Paradise Designworks Pvt Ltd. The costume designer duo works extensively in the Indian film industry and are known for their attention to detail while creating authentic characters for their films. They are also known as designers who practice sustainability in Costume Design. Their films have won the Filmfare Award for Best Costume Design twice: First in 2009 for Oye Lucky! Lucky Oye! and then in 2013 for Shanghai.

== Early life ==
Manoshi is a Bengali/Sylhety from Assam and was raised in New Delhi, where she completed her graduation. Inclined toward the arts from childhood, Manoshi apprenticed with directors as a Storyboard Artist, while still in college. She also did a brief stint in an export house where she found a perfect amalgamation of art and fabrics. Manoshi owes her technical knowledge of fabrics to her father who is a textile engineer by profession.

== Career ==
Manoshi always wanted to work in advertising and worked with the director, Pradeep Sarkar on many TVCs and music videos. In this process, she met her creative partner Rushi Sharma in 2000, where they realized how they complemented each other's design ethos.

Manoshi and Rushi designed their first feature film with Dibakar Banerjee’s Khosla Ka Ghosla in 2006. They set up their company Fools’ Paradise in 2007, following which they went on to design costumes for Oye Lucky! Lucky Oye! in 2008. They have designed character costumes for films like Once Upon a Time in Mumbaai (2010), Shanghai (2012), Talaash (2012), Queen(2013), PK(2014), Detective Byomkesh Bakshy! (2016), Thugs of Hindostan (2018), Sherni (2021), Shamshera (2022) and many more.

Manoshi and Rushi started working 15 days before the shooting schedule on the film Khosla ka Ghosla. They designed the production with a limited budget, and the film is often cited as part of a trend in independent Indian cinema during the 2000s. Today, they are hired to begin designing as soon as a script is approved and the actors are chosen.

PK became the highest grossing Bollywood film of its time, with earnings of nearly 754 crore INR. The duo's design of Aamir Khan, Sanjay Dutt and Anushka Sharma in PK received nationwide applause and recognition as well as the Screen Awards for 2015. Manoshi and Rushi laid the seeds of recycling in Costume Design from this film onwards. In PK, they bought clothes off of people’s backs in the streets of Rajasthan to get the most authentic look for the parts. Manoshi and Rushi have also taken extensive efforts to increase the sustainability of their creative process from start to finish. To promote ethical design, they source fabrics directly from weavers and artisans, provide employment with higher living wages to cottage industry workers while believing in the philosophy of buying local. They have also made great efforts to recycle pre-loved costumes from old film stocks. For Jayeshbhai Jordaar (2022), they travelled along the Kutch, creating supply chains for future projects like Maja Ma (2022) and more.

For their sustainability endeavors and SOP’s in Indian costume design, they were awarded the Elle Sustainability Award for Mindful Design (2023).

Manoshi and Rushi have been invited by SRFTI and NIFT to mentor their students on Costume Design. They have hence ventured into creating curriculum around Fashion, Costumes and Sustainability in design.

== Awards ==
Year	Award	Category	Nominated work	Result
2009	Filmfare Awards	Best Costume Design	Oye Lucky! Lucky Oye!	Won
2010	Global Indian Film Awards	Best Costume Design	Once Upon a Time in Mumbaai	Won
2013	Filmfare Awards	Best Costume Design	Shanghai	Won
2013	Filmfare Awards	Best Costume Design	Queen	Nominated
2013	Screen Awards	Best Costume Design	Queen	Won
2014	Screen Awards	Best Costume Design	PK	Won
2015	Filmfare Awards	Best Costume Design	PK	Nominated
2015	Bollywood Style Awards	Best Costume Design	Kangana Ranaut's Queen Catwalk	Won

== Filmography ==
Year	Title
2003	Natale in India
2006	Khosla Ka Ghosla
2008	Oye Lucky! Lucky Oye!
2010	Love Sex Aur Dhokha
2010	Once Upon a Time in Mumbaai
2010	Lafangey Parindey
2010	10ml LOVE
2011	Chalo Dilli
2011	Chillar Party
2012	Satyamev Jayate
2012	Shanghai
2012	Talaash: The Answer Lies Within
2013	Queen
2013	Dhoom 3
2014	Kick
2014	PK
2015	Detective Byomkesh Bakshy!
2016	Sanam Teri Kasam
2016	Azhar
2017	A Gentleman
2017	Simran
2018	Love Per Square Foot
2018	Thugs of Hindostan
2018	Noblemen
2020	Panga
2020	Gulabi Lens (short)
20221	Sherni
2021	Bell Bottom
2022	Jayeshbhai Jordaar
2022	Rashtra Kavach Om
2022	Shamshera
2022	Good Luck Jerry
2022	Cuttputlli
2022	Maja Ma
2022	Ram Setu
2023	Kakuda
2026	Raja Shivaji
