= Varsha Shilpa =

Indian costume designers

Varsha Shilpa is a duo of Indian costume designers, who designed for films like Do Dooni Char (2010), Ishaqzaade (2012), Shuddh Desi Romance (2013), Daawat-e-Ishq (2014) etc. They received Filmfare Award for Best Costume Design for Do Dooni Char. Their design for old couple, Rishi Kapoor and Neetu Singh earned that accolade. They later designed for actor Sushant Singh Rajput, Parineeti Chopra and debutant actress Vaani Kapoor in the film Shuddh Desi Romance (2013). Parineeti Chopra is their regular partner, they designed for her in Ishaqzaade and Daawat-e-Ishq also.

== Fashion shows ==
Actress Huma Qureshi wore a midnight blue ensemble, designed by Varsha Wadhwa of the designer duo in a winter fashion show held on 29 December 2017.

== Filmography ==
- The Last Lear (2007)
- Krazzy 4 (2008)
- Do Dooni Char (2010)
- Ishaqzaade (2012)
- Shuddh Desi Romance (2013)
- Daawat-e-Ishq (2014)

== Awards ==
Year	Award	Film	Result
2011	Filmfare Award for Best Costume Design	Do Dooni Char	Won
2014	Filmfare Award for Best Costume Design	Shuddh Desi Romance	Nominated
2014	Screen Weekly Award for Best Costume Design	Shuddh Desi Romance	Nominated
