= Rushi Sharma =

Indian costume designer

- Occupation: Costume designer
- Notable work: Shanghai (2012 film); Oye Lucky! Lucky Oye!

Rushi Sharma is an Indian costume designer. She and her creative partner Manoshi Nath co-founded Fools Paradise Design Works Pvt Ltd. in 2007 and have worked extensively in the Indian film industry. Rushi and Manoshi are known for creating authentic characters through their attention to detail and are also recognised as designers who practice sustainability in costume design. Their films have won many awards, including two Filmfare Awards for Best Costume Design — the first in 2009 for Oye Lucky! Lucky Oye! and the second in 2013 for Shanghai.

== Early life ==
Rushi studied Fashion Design at NIFT, a leading fashion institute in New Delhi and started working professionally as a costume designer in theatre.

She has also studied sustainable fashion at Polimoda fashion school in Italy.

== Career ==
Rushi worked with India Take One on international commercials and music videos as a costume designer. She met Manoshi Nath in 2000 while working on commercials with Pradeep Sarkar, where they realised how they complemented each other’s design ethos.

The first feature film Rushi and Manoshi designed was Dibakar Banerjee’s Khosla Ka Ghosla (2006). Since they set up their company, Fools Paradise, in 2007, their names have only been taken together. They went on to design costumes for Oye Lucky! Lucky Oye! in 2008, and have designed character costumes for films like Once Upon a Time in Mumbaai (2010), Shanghai (2012), Talaash (2012), Queen (2014), PK (2014), Detective Byomkesh Bakshy! (2016), Sherni (2021), Shamshera (2022), Thugs of Hindostan (2018) and many more.

The film Khosla Ka Ghosla came to them just 15 days before the shooting schedule. They designed the iconic cult film, which influenced the local flavor of indie cinema in the 2000s, on a shoestring budget. Today, Rushi and Manoshi are called to design a film from the day a script is greenlit and the actors are finalized.

PK, a film that they worked on, became the highest-grossing Bollywood film of its time, with nearly 754 crore INR in earnings. Rushi and Manoshi’s designs for Aamir Khan, Sanjay Dutt and Anushka Sharma in PK, for which they won at the Screen Awards (2015), received nationwide applause and recognition.

From then on, Rushi and Manoshi planted the seeds of recycling in costume design. In PK, they bought clothes off of people’s backs in the streets of Rajasthan to get the most authentic look for the parts. Rushi and Manoshi have also made extensive efforts to increase the sustainability of their creative process from start to finish. To promote ethical design, they source fabrics directly from weavers and artisans, provide employment with higher living wages to cottage industry workers, and believe in the philosophy of buying locally. They have also made great efforts to recycle pre-loved costumes from old film stocks. For Jayeshbhai Jordaar (2022), they travelled along the Kutch, creating supply chains for future projects like Maja Ma (2022) and more.

For their sustainability endeavours and SOPs in Indian costume design, they were awarded the Elle Sustainability Award for Mindful Design (2023). Rushi and Manoshi have been invited by SRFTI and NIFT to mentor their students on costume design. They have hence ventured into creating a curriculum around Fashion, Costumes and Sustainability in design.

== Awards ==
| Year | Award | Category | Nominated work | Result |
|---|---|---|---|---|
| 2009 | Filmfare Awards | Best Costume Design | Oye Lucky! Lucky Oye! | Won |
| 2010 | Global Indian Film Awards | Best Costume Design | Once Upon a Time in Mumbaai | Won |
| 2013 | Filmfare Awards | Best Costume Design | Shanghai | Won |
| 2013 | Filmfare Awards | Best Costume Design | Queen | Nominated |
| 2013 | Screen Awards | Best Costume Design | Queen | Won |
| 2014 | Screen Awards | Best Costume Design | PK | Won |
| 2015 | Filmfare Awards | Best Costume Design | PK | Nominated |
| 2015 | Bollywood Style Awards | Best Costume Design | Kangana Ranaut's Queen Catwalk | Won |

== Filmography ==
| Year | Title |
|---|---|
| 2003 | Natale in India |
| 2006 | Khosla Ka Ghosla |
| 2008 | Oye Lucky! Lucky Oye! |
| 2010 | Love Sex Aur Dhokha |
| 2010 | Once Upon a Time in Mumbaai |
| 2010 | Lafangey Parindey |
| 2010 | 10ml LOVE |
| 2011 | Chalo Dilli |
| 2011 | Chillar Party |
| 2012 | Satyamev Jayate |
| 2012 | Shanghai |
| 2012 | Talaash: The Answer Lies Within |
| 2013 | Queen |
| 2013 | Dhoom 3 |
| 2014 | Kick |
| 2014 | PK |
| 2015 | Detective Byomkesh Bakshy! |
| 2016 | Sanam Teri Kasam |
| 2016 | Azhar |
| 2017 | A Gentleman |
| 2017 | Simran |
| 2018 | Love Per Square Foot |
| 2018 | Thugs of Hindostan |
| 2018 | Noblemen |
| 2020 | Panga |
| 2020 | Gulabi Lens (short) |
| 20221 | Sherni |
| 2021 | Bell Bottom |
| 2022 | Jayeshbhai Jordaar |
| 2022 | Rashtra Kavach Om |
| 2022 | Shamshera |
| 2022 | Good Luck Jerry |
| 2022 | Cuttputlli |
| 2022 | Maja Ma |
| 2022 | Ram Setu |
| 2023 | Kakuda |
| 2026 | Raja Shivaji |
