= Anju Modi =

Indian costume designer

Anju Modi is an Indian costume designer who designed for Bajirao Mastani (2015) and Goliyon Ki Raasleela Ram Leela(2013). She earned Filmfare Award for Best Costume Design in 2016.

She was important part of the Indian Fashion Industry since late 90s. Over the years, the Indian fashion industry has witnessed the founder member of the Fashion Design Council of India (FDCI) successfully straddle the roles of an artisan and a designer. Modi is committed to stimulate the growth of Indian textile and craftsmen.

== Brand philosophy ==
Anju Modi's endeavor muses on the philosophy that Design has no language. The designer whose expertise with weaves and crafts is well known, considers weavers and craftsmen her mentors. The concept and inspirations behind Modi's couture metamorphose on account of her state of mind at a particular moment. The core of her collections is the couture and the craftsmanship behind it. Inspired by the charm that reflects in the history of India, Modi has always been enthusiastic about working with film makers who focus on historical characters, rooted in history or mythologies.

She has been collaborating with artisans across the country for a long period of time. She has created an extensive library in areas like weaving, vegetable dyeing, block printing and old traditional embroidery. The driving force behind each of her collections is the Indian heritage, through which she brings out the contemporary charm. Actors like Madhuri Dixit, Kangana Ranaut, Sonam Kapoor, Kareena Kapoor Khan, Kriti Sanon and Jacqueline Fernandes have been seen wearing Modi's ensembles at various occasions.

One of her collection video that depicts a coming-of-age story of a young girl becoming a bride, seems to further reinstate. “The movie starts with a girl playing around in a waterbody with blooming lotuses surrounding her. The vibe is all about innocence and mischievousness. She then gets ready for the union in a red outfit to depict passion and positive energy," she elaborates. The models can be seen dressed in pieces from her latest collection that are as classic as they are breezy and versatile.

== Filmography ==
=== Costume designer ===
- Goliyon ki Raslila- Ram Leela (2013)
- Bajirao Mastani (2016)
- Syeraa Narsimha Reddy (2019)

== Awards ==
| Year | Award | Film | Result |
|---|---|---|---|
| 2016 | Filmfare Award for Best Costume Design | Bajirao Mastani | Won |
| 2016 | Asian Film Award for Best Costume Design | Bajirao Mastani | Nominated |
| 2014 | Apsara Award for Best Costume Design | Goliyon Ki Raasleela Ram-Leela | Won |
| 2014 | IBN Live Movie Award for Best Costume Design | Goliyon Ki Raasleela Ram-Leela | Won |
| 2014 | Screen Weekly Award for Best Costume Design | Goliyon Ki Raasleela Ram-Leela | Won |
| 2014 | Filmfare Award for Best Costume Design | Goliyon Ki Raasleela Ram-Leela | Nominated |
