= Oye Lucky! Lucky Oye! =

2008 Indian film by Dibakar Banerjee

- Theatrical release poster
- Directed by: Dibakar Banerjee
- Written by: Urmi Juvekar; Dibakar Banerjee; Manu Rishi (dialogue)
- Produced by: Ronnie Screwvala
- Starring: Abhay Deol; Paresh Rawal; Neetu Chandra
- Cinematography: Kartik Vijay
- Edited by: Shyamal Karmakar; Namrata Rao
- Music by: Songs: Sneha Khanwalkar; Background Score: Dhruv Dhalla
- Production company: UTV Motion Pictures
- Distributed by: UTV Motion Pictures
- Release date: 28 November 2008
- Running time: 122 minutes
- Country: India
- Language: Hindi

Oye Lucky! Lucky Oye! is a 2008 Indian Hindi-language crime comedy film starring Abhay Deol, Paresh Rawal, Neetu Chandra, Manu Rishi, Manjot Singh and Archana Puran Singh. It was directed by Dibakar Banerjee. The film won the National Film Award for Best Popular Film. The film is inspired by the real life shenanigans of Devinder Singh alias Bunty, a real-life "super-chor", originally from Vikaspuri, Delhi.

== Plot ==
The film begins by depicting the media's obsession with 31-year-old Lucky, a skilled thief operating across various Indian cities. The narrative then shifts to Lucky's teenage years, highlighting a tumultuous family dynamic when his father, Jani (Paresh Rawal), introduces his second wife. A young Lucky is seen impulsively stealing motorbikes with the help of his friend, Bangali, initially driven by the simple wish to impress girls and escape his harsh home life.

As the story progresses into his adult years, Lucky and Bangali find themselves exploited by Gogi (also played by Rawal), a flamboyant marriage contractor who pulls them into a more organized world of crime. During this phase, Lucky's audacity grows; one important sequence shows him deftly navigating a high-society gala, using his charm to blend in while orchestrating a daring heist that underscores his ingenuity. It is also during these years that Lucky develops a tender yet conflicted romantic relationship with Sonal, the sister of a dancer once associated with Gogi.

After enduring further mistreatment at the hands of Gogi, a turning point arrives when Lucky travels to Mumbai. There, he encounters Dr. Handa (another character portrayed by Rawal) and he assumes the alias Sunny Arora. In a parallel narrative, a determined police officer, Devender Singh, intensifies his pressure on Gogi to reveal information about Lucky's activities in Delhi, setting up a tense game of cat and mouse between law enforcement and the criminal underworld.

Back in Delhi, Lucky reconnects with Bengali and embarks on an audacious plan to rob the home of reporter Babul Awasthi, who had infamously dismissed him as a “normal thief.” In a suspenseful sequence, Lucky consults Dr. Handa, unknowingly seeking guidance on infiltrating the reporter's heavily guarded residence. The plan succeeds in a dramatic heist scene, only for tragedy to strike when Awasthi, in a fit of frustration, kills his own dog.

After narrowly escaping capture, Lucky flees with Sonal and Bengali. Along the way, he confronts his estranged brother and learns of his parents’ long-standing separation, a revelation that forces him to reevaluate his life. This introspective encounter, coupled with the cumulative betrayals and losses he has endured, ultimately prompts Lucky to leave his life of crime behind and settle down with Sonal.

Lucky aspires to open a restaurant, in partnership with Handa, but Handa dupes him of his investment and instead makes Bangali a partner, to open the restaurant under his name. Lucky, in a fit of rage, goes on a frenzy of stealing, but, also finds out that Gogi was using Bangali to keep an eye on him.

After meeting Sonal for the last time, he is eventually arrested after escaping three times.

== Cast ==
- Abhay Deol as Lovinder 'Lucky' Singh / Sunny Arora
  - Manjot Singh as the Young Lovinder ‘Lucky’ Singh
- Paresh Rawal in a triple role as
  - Jani Singh
  - Gogi Arora
  - Dr. B. D. Handa
- Neetu Chandra as Sonal
- Manu Rishi as Bangali / Vicky
- Richa Chadha as Dolly
- Archana Puran Singh as Kamlesh Handa
- Anurag Arora as Inspector Devender Singh / Yamraj
- Kamlesh Gill as Chaai Ji (Chadha's Mother)

== Soundtrack ==
All music is composed by Sneha Khanwalkar.

Track list
No.	Title	Artist(s)	Length
1.	"Oye Lucky"	Mika Singh	3:59
2.	"Jugni"	Des Raj Lachkani	5:05
3.	"Tu Raja Ki Raj Dulari"	Rajbir	7:04
4.	"Superchor"	Dilbahar, Akshay Verma	4:44
5.	"Hooriyaan"	Brijesh Shandilya, Himani Kapoor	3:28
6.	"Oye Lucky (Remix)"	Mika Singh, Dj A-Myth	3:49
7.	"Jugni (Remix)"	Des Raj Lachkani, Dj A-Myth	4:40
Total length:			36:49

== Reception ==
=== Critical reception ===
Oye Lucky! Lucky Oye! received positive critical acclaim. Raja Sen of Rediff gave it 4.5/5 stars, saying that "All I can say is – after very gratefully handing it four and a half stars, in case you asked – that this is a movie to love. And one that makes the audience feel just like the hero: really, really lucky." Naresh K. Deoshi of Apun Ka Choice gave the movie 3.5/5 stars, concluding that "Grab a ticket. If you're broke, steal it." Nikhat Kazmi of Times of India gave the movie 3.5/5 stars, commenting that "Oye Lucky! Lucky Oye! works perfectly as a simple story of a young boy (Abhay Deol) who is driven to crime not because he is hungry, poor, starving." Syed Firdaus Ashraf of Rediff gave 3/5 stars, concluding that "The film only fails in the music department, by Sneha Khanwalkar. The dhols and drums get too loud from time to time, and get very annoying. If you can overlook this minor discomfort, go for it!" Rajeev Masand of CNN-IBN gave 3/5 stars, stating that "Watch it because it's a film that respects your intelligence. And films like that are hard to find."

Sonia Chopra of Sify gave it 2.5/5 stars, saying that "Writer-director Dibakar Banerjee cannot live down the expectations Khosla Ka Ghosla brings with it. Banerjee does meet those expectations, however Oye Lucky! is a different product altogether. More than a beginning-middle-end story, Oye Lucky! is more a peek into Delhi's belly, into the characters' lives, and into complex bitter-sweet relationships." Martin D'Souza of Glamsham gave 2.5/5 stars, concluding that "A film with a feel of the eighties, OLLO will identify well with the viewers from the North. But yes, if you want a quiet, funny outing to lighten your mood, watching OLLO is not a bad option." Taran Adarsh of Bollywood Hungama gave the movie 2/5 stars, saying that "On the whole, OYE LUCKY! LUCKY OYE! is a well-executed enterprise, which has its share of limitations. At the box-office, the film caters to the Northern audience mainly – Delhi and Punjab specifically. Besides North, the plexes in Mumbai should fare slightly better."

=== Box office ===
Oye Lucky! Lucky Oye! was an average grosser, with ₹61.4 million (US$640,000) nett in its lifetime, releasing two days after the 26/11 Mumbai attacks.

== Production ==
Originally, Paresh Rawal was only approached by Dibakar Banerjee to play the role of Gogi. He was then convinced by the director to also take on the role of Dr. Handa, and finally the role of Lucky's father. Despite his initial hesitation to sport a beard in the role of Lucky's father, Paresh Rawal called working on this film the most satisfying experience of his career.

== Awards ==
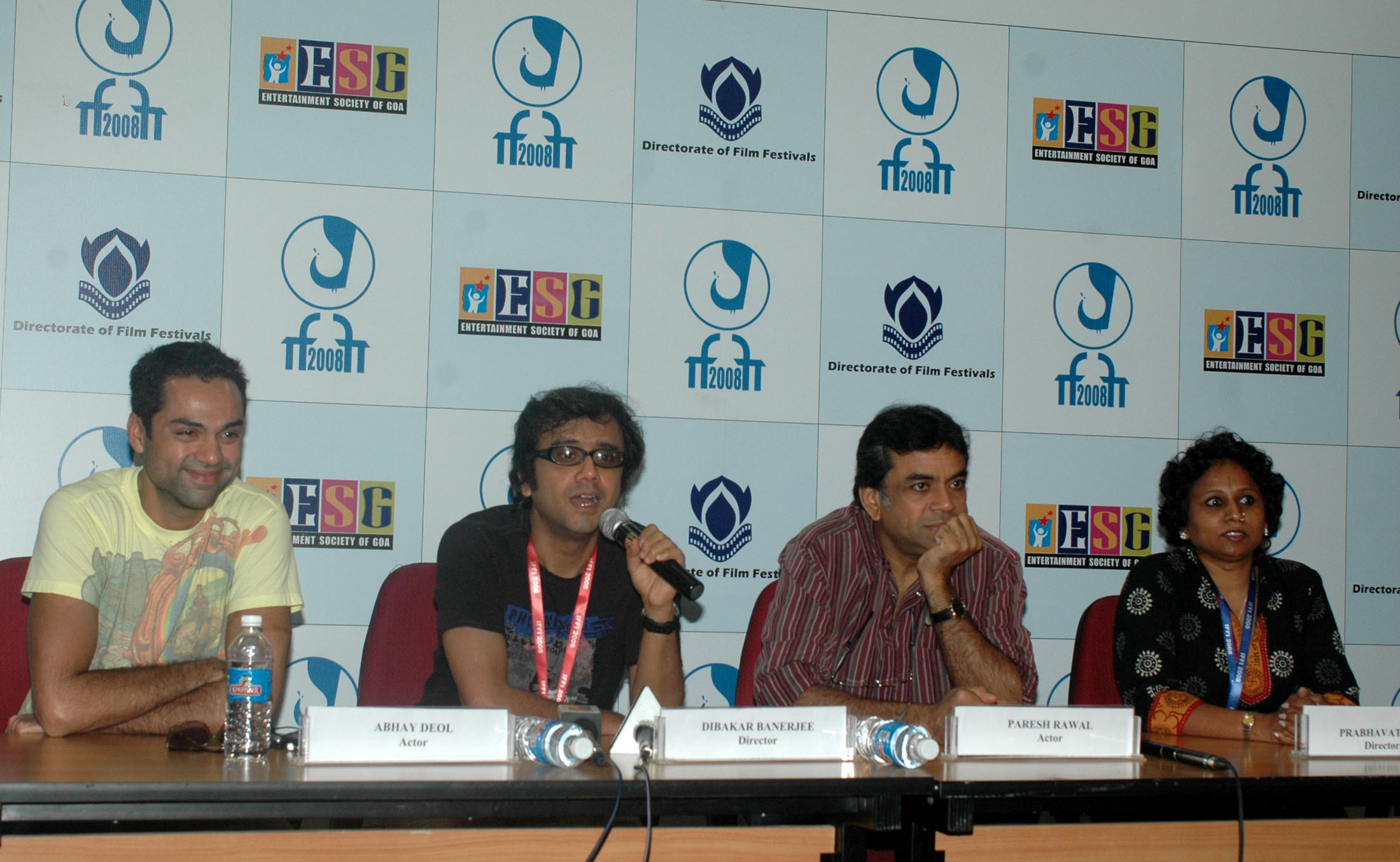
The Director of the film, Dibakar Banerjee, the Actors Paresh Rawal, Abhay Deol and the Director (M&C), PIB, Ms. Prabhavati Akashi at a press conference, during the 39th International Film Festival (IFFI-2008), in Panaji, Goa on 27 November 2008.

- 2009: National Film Award
  - Best Popular Film
- 2009: Filmfare Award
  - Critics Award for Best Actor: Manjot Singh
  - Best Dialogue: Manu Rishi
  - Best Costumes: Rushi Sharma / Manoshi Nath
- 2009: IIFA Award
  - Best Dialogue: Manu Rishi
- 2009: Star Screen Award
  - Best Story: Dibaker Banerjee: Nominated
