= Dibakar Banerjee =

Indian film director

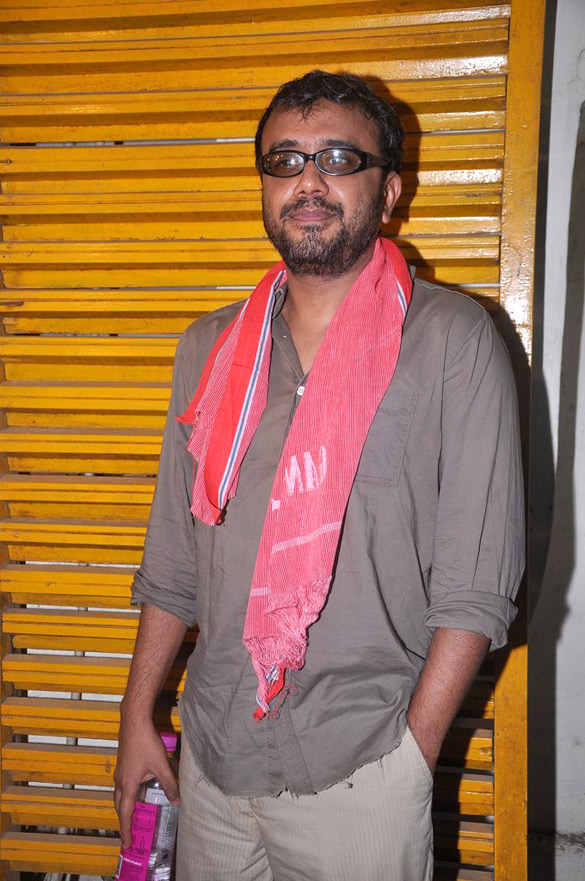
- Banerjee at the screening of Gangs of Wasseypur in 2012
- Born: 21 June 1969 (age 57); New Delhi, India
- Education: National Institute of Design
- Occupations: Filmmaker; screenwriter; lyricist; musician
- Years active: 2006–present

Dibakar Banerjee (born 21 June 1969) is an Indian film director, screenwriter, producer and advertisement-filmmaker known for his work in Hindi films. Banerjee started his career in advertising, being a feature filmmaker, he still continues to be an ad-filmmaker. He also runs his own film production company, Dibakar Banerjee Productions.

As a filmmaker, he is known for Khosla Ka Ghosla (2006), Oye Lucky! Lucky Oye! (2008), both of which won National Film Awards. His next film was the experimental Love Sex Aur Dhokha (2010). It was followed by the political drama Shanghai (2012) and Bombay Talkies (2013), which was made as a celebration of the centenary year of Indian cinema. In 2015, he directed Detective Byomkesh Bakshy!, a film based on the fictional character Byomkesh Bakshi.

== Personal life ==
Dibakar Banerjee was born and raised in New Rohtak Road near Karol Bagh, in West Delhi, and studied at Bal Bharati Public School, Delhi. After finishing his schooling, he joined the National Institute of Design, at Ahmedabad to study visual communications and graphic design, but left it two and a half years later. Back in New Delhi, he worked briefly with audio-visual filmmaker Sam Mathews.

He is married to Richa Puranesh, who has an FMCG marketing background, and the couple lived in Delhi for many years. After the success of Khosla Ka Ghosla, they moved to Mumbai and live in Parel, Mumbai with their two daughters.

== Career ==
Banerjee joined advertising as a copywriter first with Shems Combit, TBWA Anthem, and then he joined Contract Advertising, Delhi, where he worked with Pradeep Sarkar, who was then a creative director at the agency. Screenwriter Jaideep Sahni was also one of his colleagues, who later penned Khosla Ka Ghosla's story, screenplay, dialogues and lyrics. In 1997, he left Contract to launch his own company named Watermark, with two ex- NID friends, to develop promos for Channel V and MTV and Ad films for major brands.

With friend and ex-colleague Jaideep Sahni he conceptualised his debut film "about Delhi, based in Delhi", Khosla Ka Ghosla (2006) starring Anupam Kher and Boman Irani, shot in locations in and around New Delhi. The film was a critical and commercial success and won the National Film Award. The film brought Banerjee in the list of new filmmakers who were bringing about a marked shift in Bollywood themes, which typically focuses on stories & characters from in and around Mumbai.

Banerjee then co-wrote and directed his second feature, Oye Lucky! Lucky Oye! (2008), which was also set in his hometown Delhi. The film starring Abhay Deol, Neetu Chandra and Paresh Rawal, premiered at the International Film Festival of India, Goa, along with Museum of Modern Art, New York. It was released in the 2008 Mumbai attacks weekend to positive reviews and went on to become a sleeper hit. Rachel Saltz of The New York Times described the film as "a breezy mix of satire and realism". Oye Lucky! Lucky Oye! won the National Film Award for Best Popular Film.

In 2010, Banerjee directed India's first film shot entirely on Digital Camera, and to be presented in the found footage style, Love Sex Aur Dhokha. The film was shown through Handycams, CCTV cameras and mobile cameras. Dealing with Issues like honour killings, MMS scandals, and sting operations, the film was released on 19 March 2010 to positive reception and strong box office results. Rajeev Masand of CNN-IBN rated it 4 out of 5, stating " Dibakar Banerjee's Love, Sex aur Dhoka is the most riveting Hindi film in recent memory. [...] You will be shocked, you will be startled, but walking out of the theatre, you know you have just seen what is possibly the most important Hindi film since Satya and Dil Chahta Hai. Not only does it redefine the concept of "realistic cinema", it opens a world of possibilities in terms of how you can shoot films now."

Banerjee's next directorial venture was Shanghai (2012), a political drama involving an assassination of a social activist. Starring Abhay Deol, Kalki Koechlin and Emraan Hashmi, the film was based on the 1967 Greek novel, Z, written by Vassilis Vassilikos. Shanghai premiered at the 2012 Toronto International Film Festival and released on 8 June 2012.

In 2013, Banerjee adapted Satyajit Ray's short story, Patol Babu, Film Star, starring Nawazuddin Siddiqui for Bombay Talkies. It was the part of the anthology film made by four directors, including Anurag Kashyap, Zoya Akhtar and Karan Johar. The film was made as a celebration of 100 years of Indian cinema. Bombay Talkies under-performed at the box office, but was well received by critics; specially Banerjee's story. Anupama Chopra in her review mentioned: "Dibakar narrates his story with such tenderness and Siddiqui is so good that by the end, I was wiping away tears".

Next, Banerjee went on to adapt Byomkesh Bakshi, created by the Bengali writer Sharadindu Bandyopadhyay, as Detective Byomkesh Bakshy! (2015). The film starring Sushant Singh Rajput as the titular character was produced jointly by Yash Raj Films and his own film production company Dibakar Banerjee Productions. Set in the Kolkata of 1940s, the film was released on 3 April 2015 and met with mixed to positive reviews from critics.

Banerjee co-produced Love Sex Aur Dhokha's co-writer Kanu Behl first film as a director, Titli, with Yash Raj Films. The film was selected to take part in the Un Certain Regard section of the 2014 Cannes Film Festival. It was released in India on 30 October 2015, to positive reviews. The same month he returned the National Award for Khosla ka Ghosla along with 12 other filmmakers, in protest against the Ministry of Information and Broadcasting refusing to roll back FTII's appointment of Gajendra Chauhan.

In 2018, Banerjee again collaborated with Kashyap, Akhtar and Johar for the anthology film Lust Stories. Based on the theme of lust, it had stories told through female perspective. Banerjee's story starred Manisha Koirala and Sanjay Kapoor. The film was released on Netflix on 15 June 2018.

In 2020, Banerjee worked alongside Johar, Kashyap, and Akhtar for the third time on the anthology film Ghost Stories that premiered on Netflix on 1 January 2020. Banerjee's short followed a man, played by Sukant Goel, who travels to different towns when he comes across a particularly disturbing one that cannibals inhabit.

Banerjee co-wrote Sandeep Aur Pinky Faraar with Varun Grover which was released on 19 March 2021. The film followed a banker, Sandeep, played by Parineeti Chopra, and a suspended male cop, Pinky, played by Arjun Kapoor, as they navigated an escape after a setup puts them both in danger.

In 2022, Banerjee's Netflix production, Tees, which was announced in 2019, starring Naseeruddin Shah, Manisha Koirala, Huma Qureshi and Divya Dutta, was shelved.

Most recently, Banerjee directed, produced and wrote Love Sex Aur Dhokha 2 which was a sequel to Love Sex Aur Dhokha (2010). The film was released on 19 April 2024 and flopped at the box office. While not being received well at the box office, the film was nominated for five awards at the 70th Filmfare Awards in 2025 including Best Story.

== Filmography ==
Year	Film	Director	Producer	Screenwriter	Lyricist	Note
2006	Khosla Ka Ghosla	Yes				
2008	Oye Lucky! Lucky Oye!	Yes		Yes		
2010	Love Sex Aur Dhokha	Yes	Yes	Yes		
2012	Shanghai	Yes	Yes	Yes	Yes	
2013	Bombay Talkies	Yes		Yes		Short film
2015	Detective Byomkesh Bakshy!	Yes	Yes	Yes		
2015	Titli		Yes			
2018	Lust Stories	Yes		Yes		Short film
2020	Ghost Stories	Yes		Yes		Short film
2021	Sandeep Aur Pinky Faraar	Yes	Yes	Yes	Yes	
2024	Love Sex Aur Dhokha 2	Yes	Yes	Yes		
2026	Badminton	Yes		Yes		Short film
TBA	Tees	Yes		Yes		Shelved film
