= Khosla Ka Ghosla =

2006 Indian film by Dibakar Banerjee

- Theatrical release poster
- Directed by: Dibakar Banerjee
- Written by: Jaideep Sahni
- Produced by: Savita Raj Hiremath; Ronnie Screwvala
- Starring: Parvin Dabas; Tara Sharma; Anupam Kher; Boman Irani
- Cinematography: Amitabha Singh
- Edited by: Sejal Painter
- Music by: Songs: Bapi–Tutul; Dhruv Dhalla; Background Score: Bapi–Tutul
- Production company: Tandav Film Production
- Distributed by: UTV Motion Pictures
- Release date: 22 September 2006
- Running time: 125 minutes
- Country: India
- Language: Hindi
- Budget: est.₹3.75 crore (US$390,000)
- Box office: est.₹6.67 crore (US$690,000) (India Net Collection)

Khosla Ka Ghosla (transl. Khosla's nest) is a 2006 Indian Hindi-language comedy drama film directed by Dibakar Banerjee, in his directorial debut. It was produced by Savita Raj Hiremath under the Taandav Films label and Ronnie Screwvala from UTV Motion Pictures. Written by Jaideep Sahni, the film stars Parvin Dabas, Tara Sharma, Anupam Kher and Boman Irani in the lead roles. The story follows Kamal Kishore Khosla (Kher), a middle-class Delhiite and his family's attempt to reclaim their land which has been seized by a builder, Khurana (Irani).

Banerjee, an advertising filmmaker, wanted to make a feature film which showcased Delhi the way it is. The initial idea conceived by Hiremath and Sahni was about a generation gap. After finishing the script, Sahni informed Banerjee that he had found a producer in Delhi and asked him if he wanted to direct the film; Banerjee agreed to do so. The film had no buyers for two years during which time editing continued. The team showed the film to several people who loved it but were unwilling to back it. In 2006, UTV Motion Pictures stepped in and distributed the film.

Khosla Ka Ghosla was screened at the 2006 Kara Film Festival and was released on 22 September 2006 to positive critical reception. It won the National Film Award for Best Feature Film in Hindi at the 54th National Film Awards. Made on a production budget of ₹3.75 crore, the film earned a total of ₹6.67 crore India Net at the domestic box-office, making it a commercial success. It was later remade in 2008 in Tamil as Poi Solla Porom and in Kannada as Rame Gowda vs Krishna Reddy in 2010.

== Plot ==
Kamal Kishore Khosla (Anupam Kher) is a middle-aged upper-middle-class man residing in New Delhi. His family includes his kind, supportive wife, Sudha (Kiran Juneja); their hot-headed, impulsive older son, Balwant (Ranvir Shorey), also known as Bunty; their ambitious, idealistic younger son, Chiraunji Lal (Parvin Dabas), also known as Cherry; and their confident, tomboyish daughter, Nikki (Rupam Bajwa). Kamal is an ordinary man with simple tastes, who fears that he is so insignificant in life that his own family would not care about him even if he dies. The film begins with a scene of Kamal waking up in the morning after having a nightmare about his own death, where the irony is that no one cares about his death at all, and all his family members and neighbours are more interested in their materialistic needs instead. Kamal has spent all the hard-earned savings of his life from his provident fund to purchase a plot of land in South Delhi. The total cost for the land was ₹30 lakhs as well as additional ₹5 lakhs as commission for Vijendar (Rajendra Sethi), the broker who had facilitated the plot purchase for Kamal. At the prime land, Kamal intends to construct a new two-storey house for his family and also hopes that the location will be convenient for Cherry's workplace. However, Cherry, a software engineer, is not too enthusiastic about his father's plans and intends to move to New York, America to take up a job there, although he has not revealed this to his family yet. The only people Cherry discusses this matter with is his girlfriend, Meghna Chopra (Tara Sharma), a small-time theatre actress, and Asif Iqbal (Vinay Pathak), the travel agent helping him with his passport and visa paperwork. Meghna is upset with Cherry's decision and unsuccessfully convinces him to stay and support his father in the interim instead. Asif mocks Cherry's name, "Chiraunji Lal", as it is very old-fashioned, causing him to feel ashamed and declare to his family that he wishes to change his name. Kamal initially taunts Cherry over his decision, but his friend and neighbour, Amar Singh Sahni (Vinod Nagpal), makes him realise that times have changed and that he should understand Cherry's perspective. Sahni also advises Kamal to spend quality time with Cherry over drinks. After Cherry returns home from work that day, Kamal and Bunty organise a drinks night for him, but he turns furious and states that he does not drink, causing a heated argument between Kamal and Cherry. Kamal insists that Cherry must participate in family matters and fulfill all his responsibilities, when Cherry reveals his decision to move to New York after a formal job interview, disheartening his family.

During their visit to the plot for the ritual of Bhoomipujan, the Khoslas are surprised to discover that their land has been encroached upon by a group of squatters. On further enquiry with Vijendar, they realise that all the squatters are part of a property-usurping underworld headed by an unscrupulous and powerful local builder, Kishan Khurana (Boman Irani). Vijendar advises Kamal to personally meet with Khurana in order to sort out the matter. Kamal and Bunty visit Khurana and his assistant, Munjal (Rajesh Sharma), at Khurana's farmhouse, only to be directed back to Vijendar by Khurana. It eventually turns out that Vijendar was Khurana's accomplice in the plan and advises Kamal and Bunty to bid for the plot in order to reclaim it. However, the cost demanded is around 50% of the initial price of the plot, amounting to ₹15 lakhs, which Kamal neither has nor agrees to pay. Kamal, Bunty, Cherry, and Sahni appeal to local government authorities and political agencies (police, lawyers, ministers, and social workers) for assistance regarding this matter. Unfortunately, none of these entities are willing to confront Khurana and instead, offer nothing more than to get the amount demanded by Khurana reduced to around ₹10 lakhs in exchange for hefty commissions of around ₹2 lakhs for mediating, leaving Kamal aghast. Moved by his father's helplessness, Bunty decides to take action and seeks help from a gang of local wrestlers, who demolish the boundary walls built by Khurana's henchmen and successfully reclaim the plot by force. Nevertheless, this victory is short-lived as the police arrive and arrest Kamal on false charges of trespass to land, orchestrated by Khurana. After spending a day in prison, he is acquitted at Khurana's guileful behest along with a revised offer of ₹12 lakhs. As a result, Kamal's will and pride are both shattered and he resigns to his fate, feeling incapable of fighting back. He pleads with his family to avoid taking any further action, and encourages Cherry to concentrate on the new impending job he is seeking in New York.

However, Cherry, finally understanding the worth of his father, is now determined to help him and meets with Meghna, who cheers him up to support his family. Moreover, Cherry and Meghna visit Asif and discuss the grim situation with him. Asif reveals to them that he has been a former accomplice of Khurana, and that he was cheated by him too for Khurana having usurped Asif's own ancestral land. Asif offers an astute plan for the Khoslas to deceive Khurana and obtain money from him in order to secure their plot. Cherry, Asif, Meghna, and Bunty orchestrate a drama for Khurana involving another plot of land owned by the "Fisheries Department", which is of nine acres and is right next to the highway, but has been vacant for decades. Moreover, they seek help from Bapu (Navin Nischol), Meghna's mentor and the manager of a theatre group, to act as "M. L. Sethi", an industrialist from Dubai, UAE and the owner of the land, as well as Mani (Nitesh Pandey), another actor in Bapu's theatre group, to act as his assistant. Kamal is totally against this drama as he wishes for Cherry to focus on his new impending career in New York and not get trapped with his domestic issues, but Sahni convinces Kamal to give Cherry consent. As part of their drama, Cherry, Asif, Meghna, and Bunty provide Bapu and Mani two mobile phones with numbers of Dubai, a rented Mercedes car with a driver, and a room in a 5-star hotel. They begin the drama with Bapu meeting Vijendar at the hotel and treating him rudely (as Bapu does not deal with brokers) to create the illusion that he has a prime land to sell. Vijendar brings Khurana and Munjal into the picture, and the three of them finally arrive to meet Bapu and Mani at the hotel. In the meeting, Bapu uses Khurana's love for Mata Vaishnodevi to create a personal bond with him, while refusing to acknowledge Munjal and Vijendar. Khurana wishes to see the plot and the appointment is fixed for Friday. The rest of the actors in Bapu's theatre group help create a convincing scenario for Khurana, Munjal, and Vijendar, prompting them to believe the authenticity of the land and its owner, "Sethi Associates".

Later, Bapu and Mani present the fake property documents for the plot provided by Asif to Khurana and Munjal, and Khurana agrees to purchase the plot from Bapu for ₹1.4 crores along with ₹35 lakhs as advance payment in cash. Vijendar demands 3% share of the plot deal, but is silently excluded by Khurana and Munjal. Before the payment, Khurana and Munjal request to visit the land again, forcing the Khoslas, Meghna, and Asif themselves to secretly take on the roles of the labourers there, as all the actors in Bapu's theatre group have now gone to Bangalore to perform at film festivals. After the visit, Khurana and Munjal insistently take Bapu and Mani to Khurana's farmhouse for a drink. At the Khoslas' home, everyone is tremendously worried about Khurana cleverly coercing Bapu into confessing the truth about Sethi Associates not being a legitimate party. However, Bapu and Mani successfully deceive Khurana, who himself becomes drunk instead, and Munjal, taking the ₹35 lakhs in cash from Khurana's farmhouse to the Khoslas' home, which Bapu and Mani proceed to hand over to Cherry, Asif, and others, leaving them all ecstatic. The next morning, Kamal and Cherry visit Khurana and Munjal at Khurana's farmhouse and pay the ransom of ₹12 lakhs from the obtained cash. As a result, Kamal finally regains the possession of his plot, while Khurana is forced to vacate their land. The remaining cash is divided equally between the Khoslas, Asif, and Bapu's theatre group. Cherry decides to change his name to "Chirag", and abandons his plans to move to New York, while Bunty begins his own real estate business. Cherry and Meghna get married, and settle down with Cherry's family in their newly constructed house, "New Khosla Kunj", on the plot. The film ends with a scene of Khurana learning from Munjal that he has been deceived, and deciding to cover up the sham deal with Sethi Associates in order to protect his own reputation, having tasted his own medicine.

== Cast ==
- Anupam Kher as Kamal Kishore Khosla
- Boman Irani as Kishen Khurana
- Parvin Dabas as Chiraunji Lal "Cherry/Chirag" Khosla
- Tara Sharma as Meghna Chopra/Imarti
- Navin Nischol as Bapu / M. L. Sethi
- Vinay Pathak as Asif Iqbal
- Ranvir Shorey as Balwant "Bunty" Khosla
- Kiran Juneja as Sudha Khosla
- Rajendra Sethi as Vijendar
- Rupam Bajwa as Nikki Khosla
- Vinod Nagpal as Mr Amar Sawhney
- Nitesh Pandey as Mani
- Anusha Lall as Katori
- V K Sharma as Insan Singh
- Rajesh Sharma as Munjal
- Danish Aslam as Inspector

== Production ==
Dibakar Banerjee, who was making advertisement films in Delhi, wished to make a feature film "which portrayed Delhi as it is". The initial idea of the generation gap was conceived by Savita Raj Hiremath and her writer friend Jaideep Sahni, who had worked with Banerjee on advertising films. Sahni said the soul of Khosla Ka Ghosla was derived from their experience of growing up in a middle-class house in Delhi. The first half of the film was based on Sahni's personal experience of an incident in his family which left an impression on him. He thought about "how our entire system can so callously and efficiently come together in no time to exploit a common man in trouble." Later Sahni informed Banerjee that he had found a producer from Delhi and asked him if he wanted to direct the film; Banerjee agreed to do so. Banerjee said a real life experience when Sahni witnessed his father being insulted by someone powerful, helped them to develop the character of the antagonist Khurana. Sahni worked on the story for a year-and-a-half and finished in 2003. Both Banerjee and Sahni first approached Anupam Kher to play Kamal Kishore Khosla; he was "hooked" after their discussions.

Vinay Pathak had auditioned for Khurana's character for which Boman Irani was eventually selected, but the team liked Pathak's audition and offered him the role of Asif Iqbal. Ranvir Shorey was selected for the role of Balwant after two or three rounds of auditions. The role of Khurana was also offered to Rishi Kapoor who refused it. Hiremath felt this was because "commercially, it (the role) wasn't working for him." Irani had also initially refused the offer to play Khurana as he felt he was unsuitable for the role of a builder from Delhi since he was a Mumbai-born Parsi. He accepted the role after "a lot of people had raised their eyebrows" at his decision and he felt determined to make it work. Irani drove around and listened to interviews recorded with actual property dealers. He also watched real footage captured using hidden cameras to understand how they behaved. Kher said that he tried to boost the team's morale as the film was made while enduring a lot of stress. Tara Sharma was selected for the role of Meghna after an audition. Banerjee was initially reluctant to give Parvin Dabas the role of Chiraunjilal as he thought the latter would not be able to do justice to the "layered character". Dabas was later cast in the role after a recommendation and an audition. Navin Nischol was cast as Bapu.

During the course of filming, Banerjee kept Irani separate from the rest of the cast as he did not want them to meet. During filming, the investors demanded the addition of action sequences, an item song and changes in the cast. The team did not fancy these changes so Padmalaya Telefilms, their first investor, backed out of the project. Hiremath said that she had to "shell out cash" from her other company. The film's small budget meant there were limited reels to shoot. After the filming finished, the team had no money for post-production. The entire film was shot in 45 days in Delhi during the summer.

The entire opening dream sequence was filmed in one take using a hand-held camera to give it a "separate look from the rest of the film". Amitabha Singh served as the director of photography, while Sejal Painter was the editor. Banerjee had a different, sad ending for the film, but opted for Sahni's version of a more optimistic ending after realising his idea would make the film darker. The film did not have any buyers for two years. During this period editing continued. The team showed the film to several people who loved it but were unwilling to back it. Banerjee said that he gave up on releasing the film after several rejections. Later, in 2006, UTV Motion Pictures stepped in and distributed the film.

== Soundtrack ==
The soundtrack album of Khosla Ka Ghosla was composed by Dhruv Dhalla and Bapi–Tutul while the lyrics were written by Jaideep Sahni. It consists of five songs with vocals by Kailash Kher, Kunal Ganjawala, Sowmya Raoh, Adnan Sami and Qadar Niazi Qawwal. Savita, the film's producer, managed to raise some funds for the music and Sahni wrote the lyrics the same day as he was worried they might miss the opportunity. This was Dhalla's debut film. Banerjee called him after hearing his music samples and asked him to create "a Punjabi number based on the loud attitude of Delhi." Dhalla composed the tune for "Chak De Phattey" in three hours.

The album received moderate reviews. Joginder Tuteja of IndiaFM called it an "average soundtrack with two songs standing out." Further writing: "While 'Chak De Phattey' is a potential chartbuster, 'Intezar Aitbaar Tumse Pyaar' makes for an easy-on-ears listening."

No.	Title	Lyrics	Music	Singer(s)	Length
1.	"Chak De Phattey"	Jaideep Sahni	Dhruv Dhalla	Kailash Kher	5:46
2.	"Din Din Gin Gin"	Jaideep Sahni	Dhruv Dhalla	Kunal Ganjawala	5:26
3.	"Isse Pyar Kaise Karoon"	Jaideep Sahni	Dhruv Dhalla	Kunal Ganjawala, Sowmya Raoh	4:08
4.	"Ab Kya Karenge"	Jaideep Sahni	Bapi-Tutul	Adnan Sami	4:24
5.	"Intezaar Aitbaar Tumse Pyaar"	Jaideep Sahni	Dhruv Dhalla	Qadar Niazi Qawwal, Sowmya Raoh	4:22

== Release and reception ==
Khosla Ka Ghosla was screened at the 2006 Kara Film Festival and the Hay Festival in 2012. It was released theatrically on 22 September 2006 on 125 screens throughout the country. The film was released on the DVD format on 6 November 2006 and is also available on the online streaming platform, Disney+ Hotstar.

=== Critical response ===
Khosla Ka Ghosla opened to widespread critical acclaim upon release. Rajeev Masand lauded the film for its "refreshingly original plot, bang-on casting, killer soundtrack and such crisp editing that there is never a dull moment". A review in The Times of India called it "a small, unpretentious venture with some real funny performances". Raja Sen described the film as the "best comedy Bollywood has seen in the last two decades", adding: "The everyday detailing is exquisite, as is the ensemble cast dealing with a frighteningly realistic first half escaping into a breezily unreal second half. It's sheer magic."

Kaveree Bamzai of India Today declared the film as "a class apart.": "It brings back an innocence to movies missing in the sturm und drang of big budgets and bigger stars." Sukanya Verma of Rediff.com felt the film was charming for its "striking believability and everyday simplicity." However, she noted that it "felt longer than it was." Namrata Joshi described the film as "utterly discreet and unassuming", one that "tries to bring back the clean and simple story-telling of Sai Paranjpye and Hrishikesh Mukherjee." Taran Adarsh noted that the film "loses sparkle in the second hour". He also concluded that on the whole "Khosla Ka Ghosla is a well scripted and executed film that is sure to stand out in the crowd."

Sudhish Kamath of The Hindu included the film on his list of top 10 movies of the decade 2000–2009 saying: "Dibakar Banerjee and Sahni on a shoestring budget chose to bat for the common man's struggle against the powerful and reunited the individual self back with the family." David Parkinson of Radio Times wrote: "Switching between bright comedy and social drama, this is Bollywood entertainment with a conscience." In September 2018, Bhaskar Chawla of Arre noted that the film had "set the template for what was to become a new direction in Hindi cinema" that went "beyond the conventional formula of Bollywood."

=== Box office ===
Khosla Ka Ghosla was made on a production budget of approximately ₹3.75 crore (US$390,000). It earned ₹26 lakh (US$27,000) on its opening day and a total of ₹1.01 crore (US$100,000) at the end of the opening weekend. At the end of its first week, the collection was ₹1.65 crore (US$170,000). The film earned a total of ₹6.67 crore (US$690,000) India Net at the box office after the end of its theatrical run. The gross figure is ₹9.1 crore (US$940,000) including worldwide collection of ₹0.32 crore (US$33,000).

=== Awards ===
Khosla Ka Ghosla won the National Film Award for Best Feature Film in Hindi at the 54th National Film Awards. In October 2015, Banerjee decided to return the award to the government along with 12 other filmmakers, to protest the Ministry of Information and Broadcasting's refusal to roll back Film and Television Institute of India's appointment of Gajendra Chauhan as its chairman. The film's producer, Savita Raj Hiremath, claimed that Banerjee had no right to return the award since it was given to the film and not him.

== Post-release ==
Khosla Ka Ghosla is considered by many critics as one of the best films by Banerjee. It was included in Filmfare's 100 Days series—"With no big stars, relatively unheard of a director and a subject that you wouldn't rate on paper as the most exciting, Khosla Ka Ghosla manages to impress one and all." It was also mentioned in critic and author Shubhra Gupta's book, 50 Films That Changed Bollywood, 1995–2015.

In 2013, The Delhi Police Crime Branch caught a gang of cheats who duped several people by selling them plots belonging to the Delhi Development Authority by using forged documents. The officials said that the method adopted by the gang appeared to have been inspired by the film. The film was remade in Tamil as Poi Solla Porom. Directed by A. L. Vijay, the film starred Karthik Kumar, Piaa Bajpai, and Nedumudi Venu in the lead roles. It was released on 12 September 2008. It was unofficially remade in Kannada by T. N. Nagesh as Rame Gowda Vs. Krishna Reddy in 2010.

== 2024 re-release ==
Khosla Ka Ghosla now considered a cult classic film is set to re-release in theatres after 18 years on 18 October 2024. The producer Savita Raj Hiremath said the main reason the film is being re-released is because, earlier it was difficult to release the film with no distributor wanting to distribute the film. But strong content and word of mouth publicity made the film a superhit. Its dialogues are considered to have an endearing effect becoming part of daily conversations. The demand for the film in today's generation has increased, and so to cater to them the film is being re-released in India across multiplex and single screen theatres.

== Sequel ==
Producer Savita Raj Hiremath said on the sidelines of the re-release of the original movie after 18 years that a sequel film with the original star cast is in the works. Shooting for the sequel started in January 2026. Ravi Kishan and Divya Khosla Kumar joins the original star cast. Principal Photography began in Delhi and Faridabad.
