= Love per Square Foot =

2018 Indian film by Anand Tiwari

- Poster
- Directed by: Anand Tiwari
- Written by: Story & Screenplay: Anand Tiwari; Sumeet Vyas; Dialogues: Sumeet Vyas; Additional Dialogues: Asif Ali Beg
- Produced by: Ronnie Screwvala
- Starring: Vicky Kaushal; Angira Dhar; Alankrita Sahai; Ratna Pathak Shah; Supriya Pathak
- Cinematography: Avinash Arun
- Edited by: Sanyukta Kaza
- Music by: Songs: Sohail Sen; Score: Sohail Sen; Anand Bajpai
- Production company: RSVP Movies
- Distributed by: Netflix
- Release date: 14 February 2018
- Running time: 133 minutes
- Country: India
- Language: Hindi

Love per Square Foot is a 2018 Indian Hindi-language romantic comedy film directed by Anand Tiwari and produced by Ronnie Screwvala, under his newly established banner RSVP Movies. The film, which stars Vicky Kaushal and Angira Dhar in the lead roles, is about Sanjay and Kareena who try to find a house in Mumbai. They do not have enough money to earn individually, in order to buy a home, so they enter into a marriage of convenience.

Anand Tiwari who wrote the script in 2010, along with Sumeet Vyas, was intended to be made into a dark film, later they chose to make it as a romantic comedy film. The shooting of the film took place across Mumbai, within 50 days, during December 2016 and January 2017, whereas post-production works were completed within three months. Anand Bajpai composed the background score, along with Sohail Sen, while Sohail Sen composing the film's soundtrack. The film's cinematography was handled by Avinash Arun and editing done by Sanyukta Kaza.

Originally scheduled for a theatrical release, Anand Tiwari eventually sent the film's final cut to the executives of Netflix India, who approved to release the film online. Thus it became the first Indian film to be released directly on a streaming platform. Billed as the first Indian original film from Netflix, Love Per Square Foot released directly through the streaming platform on 14 February 2018, to coincide with the Valentine's Day. The film was screened at the Beijing International Film Festival, held in China in April 2019.

== Plot ==
The film revolves around Sanjay Kumar Chaturvedi, an IT engineer, and Kareena D'Souza. They both work in the same bank and dream of having their own home but are held back because of problems in their personal lives. Sanjay's boss, Raashi Khurrana is having an extra-marital affair with him, but refuses to leave her husband, Kashin, while Kareena is betrothed to Samuel and constantly held back from her dream of owning a home, by her mother Blossom. Everything changes when Sanjay finds out about a joint housing scheme, and asks Kareena to apply for the scheme with him. She agrees and the movie portrays various problems they have as they are trying to buy the apartment as an unmarried couple.

== Cast ==
- Vicky Kaushal as Sanjay Kumar Chaturvedi (Sanju)
- Angira Dhar as Kareena D'Souza
- Alankrita Sahai as Raashi Khurrana
- Raghubir Yadav as Bhaskar Chaturvedi
- Kunaal Roy Kapur as Samuel Misquitta
- Ratna Pathak Shah as Blossom D'Souza
- Supriya Pathak as Lata Chaturvedi
- Arunoday Singh as Kashin Malhotra
- Brijendra Kala as T. C. Mishra
- Rekha Bhardwaj as Classical Singer
- Ivan Sylvester Rodrigues as Noel Misquitta
- Gajraj Rao as Rehmat Bhai
- Gopal Datt as Pappu Mama
- Ayesha Raza Mishra as Poonam Tiwari
- Ranbir Kapoor as Gattu (Cameo appearance)
- Raviza Chauhan as Tina

== Production ==
=== Development ===
During the shooting of Aisha (2010) in Mumbai, Anand Tiwari witnessed a couple fighting in the middle of Carter Road in Mumbai, while he was heading to Bandra in a local train, where the same couple boarded the train and the fight continued in the train and they passionately hugged after that. He eventually stated as "the journey of love between Bandra and Mumbai Central" in an interview later, further adding that: "I always wanted to show relationships as they happen, as opposed to how they are shown in films".

The central idea of the film is whether ‘home’ is more important than ‘house’, whether the virtue of old-world understanding is more important than the more transactional love of today. I wanted to tell the story of today’s India, 60 percent of which is the youth. I wanted to reach the maximum number of people and I approached the story like a Bollywood masala film — there are songs and dances and whatnot.

— Anand Tiwari, on the core concept of the script, in an interview with Film Companion

Anand wrote the script in late 2010, as a dark film initially, with Vikramaditya Motwane, stating that the script is too dark, and it need to make the character likeable. He then discussed with his friends Manav Kaul and Sumeet Vyas, and decided to make it as a romantic comedy film. While shooting for Finding Fanny, he and Sumeet went for a short trip to Goa for 10 days, were Anand wrote the first draft of the film. He narrated the script to producer Ronnie Screwvala, at his office, whom eventually accepted to produce the film, after liking the script. The film marked Screwvala's return to production after three years. Screwvala, the founder of UTV Motion Pictures, left the company in 2014, after Disney India announced its collaboration. It eventually marked its solo production under his banner RSVP Movies.

=== Casting ===
Initially, Anand wanted Sumeet Vyas to play the role of the protagonist Sanjay Chaturvedi; but the actor changed his mind, and insisted on Vicky Kaushal, who personally worked with Anand and Sumeet in theatre workshops. The film's casting director Honey Trehan suggested Kaushal's name for the script. After being cast in the role, Kaushal stated at the 18th IIFA Awards in Mumbai that "It’s a romantic story mixed with a comedy about a boy and girl trying to find a house in Mumbai. I have never been a part of a happy film. All my earlier films have been on the intense side, so I had a ball shooting for this one. My character Sanjay is ambitious and street-smart. This film will be a proper commercial Hindi film with a lot of dancing and singing incorporated in it". Angira Dhar was hired to play the female lead, in her second collaboration with Anand after Bang Baaja Baarat. Alankrita Sahai plays the role of Sanjay's intimidating boss, Raashi, whereas Ratna Pathak Shah, Supriya Pathak and Raghubir Yadav, essayed the role of Kareena and Sanjay's parents. Ranbir Kapoor made a cameo appearance in the film.

=== Filming ===
Principal photography began in December 2016, with the film being mostly shot around Mumbai, and ended in January 2017. The entire film was shot within a duration of 50 days, including the songs, sequences and the patchwork. During the post-production process, Tiwari took about one-and-a-half months for the first cut and visual effects, with the rest of the dubbing, editing, and sound mixing lasted for two months, by which, the process was completed within three to four months.

== Soundtrack ==
Love per Square Foot

Soundtrack album by Sohail Sen
- Released: 24 January 2018
- Genre: Feature film soundtrack
- Length: 27:34
- Language: Hindi
- Label: Zee Music Company

Sohail Sen chronology
Roy (2015)	Love per Square Foot (2018)	Happy Phir Bhag Jayegi (2018)

The film's soundtrack album is composed and produced by Sohail Sen, with lyrics for the songs were written by Abhishek Dhusia, Sahir Nawab, Sumeet Suvarna, Anand Tiwari, Gopal Datt, Abhiruchi Chand, and Jamil. The soundtrack features vocals by Benny Dayal, Shivangi Bhayana, Udit Narayan, Rekha Bhardwaj, Altamash Faridi, Abhishek Dhusia, Tarannum Malik, Sahir Nawab, and Sumeet Suvarna. Bhardwaj, also made an appearance in the film, as a classical singer, apart from singing the song "Raaz Apne Dil Ke", which has two versions. The soundtrack album features seven tracks and was released by Zee Music Company on 24 January 2018.

Music critics Jay Palav and Anish Mohanty reviewed about the use of jazz, beatbox, classical, western and orchestral arrangements, and instrumentation in the soundtrack. Palav, praised the use of veteran singers, Udit Narayan, Altamash Faridi and Tarannum Malik, in the soundtrack, adding a verdict: "Sohail’s put up a winning OST, which is relatable, warm and accessible". Mohanty, added the final word "After composing for Happy Bhag Jayegi (2016), he makes a good enough comeback to the film music scene with this film, and one looks forward to see the kind of music he rolls out with his upcoming releases".

Track listing
No.	Title	Lyrics	Singer(s)	Length
1.	"Yatri Kripaya Dhyaan De"	Abhishek Dhusia, Sahir Nawab, Sumeet Suvarna	Abhishek Dhusia, Sahir Nawab, Sumeet Suvarna	3:21
2.	"Chicken Dance"	Anand Tiwari	Benny Dayal, Shivangi Bhayana	4:01
3.	"Ishq Mein Bajti Hai Ghanti"	Gopal Datt	Udit Narayan	2:42
4.	"Aashiyana"	Abhiruchi Chand	Altamash Faridi, Tarannum Malik	4:30
5.	"Maqbool Hai"	Jamil	Altamash Faridi	5:10
6.	"Raaz Apne Dil Ke" (Indian)	Gopal Datt	Rekha Bhardwaj	4:09
7.	"Raaz Apne Dil Ke" (Western)	Gopal Datt	Rekha Bhardwaj	3:41
Total length:				27:34

== Release ==
It was taken to Netflix only as a pre-sale digital kind of conversation at that time. It was actually credit to Netflix that they came back and said that they have been doing a lot of interesting stuff as originals across the globe. They have been, for a while, wanting to figure out what would be their first Netflix original release here.

— Anand Tiwari, in an interview with Firstpost, on Love Per Square Foot being the first Indian film directly aired on Netflix.

Initially scheduled for a theatrical release on 8 September 2017, Love Per Square Foot was pushed to 20 April 2018, due to post-production delays. Anand Tiwari later presented the final cut of the film, to the executives of Netflix headquarters in India, with eventually picking it for a release in their platforms. In November 2017, Netflix officially announced the release on its platform, with Love Per Square Foot becoming the first mainstream production from India to be made available on the streaming site.

Love Per Square Foot was preponed from its original scheduled date (20 April 2018), to 14 February 2018, in order to coincide the Valentine's Day. The film's official trailer was premiered on 18 January 2018. It was released as the first Netflix Indian original film in more than 190 countries on 14 February. The film was showcased at Beijing International Film Festival on 26 April 2019.

== Reception ==
Rohit Vats of Hindustan Times gave 3 out of 5 and stated "Love Per Square Foot doesn’t delve deep into matters of the heart, but it’s a feel good film for sure. Angira Dhar makes a promising debut and Vicky Kaushal shows his lighter side. Anand Tiwari handles romance with proper care and maturity. Love Per Square Foot is youthful, urbane and lovable." Ektaa Malik of The Indian Express wrote: "The film has its heart in the right place and would have worked better had it been about twenty minutes shorter." Kriti Tulsiani of News18 wrote "If the name Love Per Square Foot isn't enough to bring a smile to your face, just sit back and relish the conundrums of love and space in the city of Mumbai." Swetha Ramakrishnan of Firstpost gave 3.5 out of 5 stating "Love Per Square Foot is what happens when you have an authentic setting, a stellar cast, the right intentions and good writing all mixed into one film."

Dipti Kahrude of The Quint wrote "In popular culture, millennial lives are almost synonymous with galloping digitization. Love Per Square Foot instead directs its gaze on the middle class realities and aspirations of millennials living with their parents in cramped houses, with no privacy of bedrooms of their own. It bracingly avoids defining them merely by technology. The film may not break thrilling new ground with its subject but the observational humour in the dialogue, the bevy of supporting characters, earnest performances and an assured directorial debut make it worth a watch." Rajat Tripathi of Bollywood Life gave 3.5 out of 5 and wrote "If you are a love bug, Love Per Square Foot will certainly tug at your heartstrings and make you feel giddy. It is the perfect romantic film that we were waiting for. It is the cutest film that has released in the longest time. However, if you are not a sucker for romance, you might want to avoid it."

Rahul Desai of Film Companion gave 3 out of 5 and stated "The film merely uses “space” as a generic trigger to communicate the city's diverse stereotypes." Deepali Singh of Daily News and Analysis gave 2.5 out of 5 and stated "The plot takes a predictable turn towards the end when you know that all’s going to end well after all." Malika Bhagat of The Times of India gave 3 out of 5 stating "The fact that the end panders to the typical romantic in us is why Love Per Square Foot fails to live up to the hype." Avinash Ramachandiran of The New Indian Express wrote "Love Per Square Foot falls in the space of those bitter-sweet dramas about the housing space that we saw in the 1970s."
