= Bombay Talkies (film) =

2013 Indian anthology film

- Theatrical release poster
- Directed by: Karan Johar; Dibakar Banerjee; Zoya Akhtar; Anurag Kashyap
- Written by: Karan Johar; Dibakar Banerjee; Zoya Akhtar; Anurag Kashyap; Reema Kagti
- Produced by: Ashi Dua
- Starring: Rani Mukerji; Randeep Hooda; Saqib Saleem; Vineet Kumar Singh; Nawazuddin Siddiqui; Sadashiv Amrapurkar; Naman Jain; Swati Das; Katrina Kaif; Amitabh Bachchan
- Cinematography: Anil Mehta; Carlos Catalan; Nikos Andritsakis; Rajeev Ravi; Ayananka Bose; Pankaj Kumar
- Edited by: Deepa Bhatia; Aarti Bajaj
- Music by: Amit Trivedi
- Production company: Flying Unicorn Entertainment
- Distributed by: Viacom18 Motion Pictures
- Release date: 3 May 2013
- Running time: 128 minutes
- Country: India
- Language: Hindi
- Budget: ₹30 crore
- Box office: est. ₹10 crore

Bombay Talkies is a 2013 Indian Hindi-language anthology film consisting of four short films, directed by Karan Johar, Dibakar Banerjee, Zoya Akhtar and Anurag Kashyap. The film released on 3 May 2013, coinciding with and celebrating the 100th year of Indian cinema and the beginning of a new era in modern cinema. The title pays homage to the 1930s film studio Bombay Talkies. It screened at the 2013 Cannes Film Festival on 17 May 2013.

Bombay Talkies was the first of three anthology films from Johar, Banerjee, Akhtar and Kashyap. It was followed by Lust Stories in 2018 and Ghost Stories in 2020, the latter two were released on Netflix.

== Plot ==
Introduction

The narrative comprises four distinct short films compiled as an anthology celebrating Indian cinema. Each segment, helmed by a prominent contemporary director, explores themes ranging from identity and artistic integrity to parental expectations and generational cycles.

Ajeeb Dastaan Hai Yeh (Directed by Karan Johar)

Avinash, a young man, confronts his father and defiantly declares his homosexuality, rejecting the derogatory labels his family has used to shame him. Distraught yet determined to start anew, he leaves his parental home. At a railway station, he crosses paths with a young girl singing the classic song "Ajeeb Dastaan Hai Yeh."

Avinash secures an internship at a magazine where he meets Gayatri, who is married to an uptight man named Dev. When Avinash discloses his sexuality to Gayatri, her progressive, unbothered reaction fosters a deep friendship between them. On his birthday, Gayatri invites Avinash to their home for dinner, having beforehand informed a visibly uncomfortable Dev that her colleague is gay.

During dinner, Avinash and Dev bond over their shared passion for vintage Hindi cinema. A subtle physical proximity triggers a noticeable reaction from Dev. The following day, taking advantage of Gayatri's absence, Avinash visits Dev at home, presenting him with a music CD and playfully encouraging him to "come out". He takes Dev to meet the young singing girl, who performs "Lag Jaa Gale". Dev, deeply affected, gives the girl a large sum of money. When he cynically questions if she is lying about using it to feed her siblings, she curtly defends her honesty.

Avinash becomes certain that Dev is a closeted homosexual. However, his expectations are shattered the next day when Gayatri happily confides that she and Dev shared an incredibly passionate night. Recognizing that his own presence sparked Dev's repressed desires, a frustrated Avinash confronts Dev at his workplace. When Avinash attempts a sensual embrace, an embarrassed and enraged Dev violently assaults him. The beating triggers Avinash's repressed trauma of his own father's past physical abuse.

A conflicted Dev later visits Avinash's apartment to apologize. Torn between denial and desire, Dev assaults Avinash again before passionately kissing him. When Dev resumes his violent behavior, an enraged Avinash throws him out. Avinash immediately seeks out Gayatri to reveal the truth. Infuriated, Gayatri refuses to listen and storms home. When Dev arrives and attempts to kiss her, she repels him, realizing that her husband's repressed sexuality, not her own inadequacy, doomed their marriage. Declaring herself free, she terminates the relationship.

The film concludes with a melancholic montage: Avinash sits isolated on his bed; Gayatri independently applies her makeup; and a homeless Dev stands beside the young singing girl. When the girl requests money, Dev claims he has none. She accuses him of lying, to which he hollowly echoes her earlier words—that lying is bad—underscoring the ultimate irony that his entire life and marriage were built on a lie.

Star (Directed by Dibakar Banerjee)

Adapted from Satyajit Ray’s short story "Patol Babu, Film Star," the narrative follows Purandar, a failed stage actor struggling to provide for his wife and ailing daughter after his father’s death. His daughter constantly craves her father's theatrical storytelling, but is routinely left disappointed by his despondent state. Urged by his wife to secure employment, the prideful Purandar refuses to seek out work, expecting opportunities to find him.

By chance, he is selected from a street crowd to portray a pedestrian who accidentally collides with the lead actor in a film shoot. Upon requesting his dialogue script, he is disheartened to learn his entire performance is limited to a single monosyllabic exclamation: "Eh!"

Humiliated, Purandar contemplates walking off the set. However, he experiences a vision of his late stage mentor, who reminds him that no role is insignificant if an actor approaches it with absolute dedication. Reinvigorated, Purandar returns to the set and delivers a flawless, deeply calculated performance, even incorporating his own physical improvisations to widespread directorial praise. Refusing to wait for his financial remuneration, Purandar departs the set filled with immense artistic satisfaction. He rushes home to his daughter, vividly narrating his cinematic experience to her delight, finally fulfilling her desire for his stories.

Sheila Ki Jawaani (Directed by Zoya Akhtar)

Twelve-year-old Vicky secretly harbors an intense passion for Bollywood dancing. His strict father, however, demands that he participate in traditionally masculine sports, pushing him to become a tough football player. A devoted fan of actress Katrina Kaif, Vicky memorizes the choreography to the song "Sheila Ki Jawani". Whenever his parents leave the house, he cross-dresses in his mother's clothes and dances freely. He is eventually caught by his returning parents and severely rebuked for his behavior.

Later, while watching a television interview, Vicky hears Katrina Kaif speak about breaking societal conventions, pursuing dreams despite external obstacles, and keeping one's passions safeguarded in the beginning. Inspired by her words, Vicky finds the courage to continue. Meanwhile, Vicky's sister wishes to attend a school excursion but is denied the necessary ₹2,000 by their father, who has exhausted the household's disposable funds on Vicky’s unwanted football training.

Frustrated that their parents prioritize a sport Vicky despises over her education, the sister vents her disappointment. Realizing the systemic unfairness of the situation, Vicky devises a solution. He offers to dance to raise the required funds. Together, the siblings organize a small, ticketed dance recital for the neighborhood children inside an abandoned garage, where Vicky proudly and openly performs to his favorite cinematic tracks.

Murabba (Directed by Anurag Kashyap)

Vijay, a young man from Allahabad, travels to Mumbai to fulfill the final, eccentric wish of his ailing father. Believing it will grant him spiritual comfort and prolong his life, the father tasks Vijay with locating Bollywood superstar Amitabh Bachchan, feeding him a piece of their homemade murabba (fruit preserve), and bringing back the remaining half of the preserve.

In Mumbai, Vijay faces a grueling ordeal trying to bypass the actor's intense security apparatus. Starving, penniless, and forced to take up odd jobs to survive, Vijay persists until he finally secures a brief personal audience with Bachchan. Moved by Vijay's sheer determination, the actor graciously obliges, consumes half of the murabba, and returns the rest.

Triumphant, Vijay boards a train back to Allahabad, proudly recounting his journey to his fellow passengers. Tragedy strikes when a malicious passenger shatters the glass jar, and another accidentally crushes the remaining preserve. Heartbroken and desperate to keep his father's hope alive, Vijay purchases a replacement jar and fresh murabba before arriving home.

When he presents the substitute preserve, his father immediately senses the deception, accurately deducing that the original jar was broken, forcing Vijay to confess. Smiling, the father reveals a long-hidden generational secret: decades earlier, his own father had sent him to Mumbai on an identical mission to have superstar Dilip Kumar dip his finger into a jar of honey. By the time he reached the actor, the honey was infested with ants, and Dilip Kumar refused. To appease his dying father, Vijay's father had quietly replaced the honey, dipped his own finger into it, and presented it as authentic. His grandfather unsuspectingly ate the honey for years and lived a long life. The film ends with Vijay's father reflecting on how life inevitably comes full circle.

== Cast ==
=== Ajeeb Dastaan Hai Yeh ===
- Rani Mukerji as Gayatri
- Randeep Hooda as Dev
- Saqib Saleem as Avinash
- Shiv Kumar Subramaniam as Avinash's father

=== Star ===
- Nawazuddin Siddiqui as Purandar
- Sadashiv Amrapurkar as the spirit of Purandar's stage mentor

=== Sheila ki Jawani ===
- Naman Jain as Vicky
- Ranvir Shorey as Vicky's father
- Swati Das
- Katrina Kaif as herself (cameo appearance)

=== Murabba ===
- Vineet Kumar Singh as Vijay
- Sudhir Pandey as Vijay's father
- Amitabh Bachchan as Himself (special appearance)

Special appearances

(during the song "Apna Bombay Talkies", in order of appearance)

- Aamir Khan
- Madhuri Dixit
- Karisma Kapoor
- Akshay Kumar
- Juhi Chawla
- Saif Ali Khan
- Rani Mukerji
- Sridevi
- Priyanka Chopra
- Farhan Akhtar
- Imran Khan
- Vidya Balan
- Kareena Kapoor Khan
- Ranveer Singh
- Anil Kapoor
- Shahid Kapoor
- Sonam Kapoor
- Deepika Padukone
- Ranbir Kapoor
- Shah Rukh Khan

== Reception ==
=== Critical reception ===
Bombay Talkies received positive reviews upon release. Taran Adarsh of Bollywood Hungama gave the film 4/5 stars, and noted that the film "is one of those infrequent movies wherein you get to eyeball the superior efforts of four top notch film-makers in less than two hours.This reality alone makes the film a compelling watch, while the superior performances and absorbing themes that the movie prides itself in only serve as an icing on the cake. This celebration of cinema is a must watch!" He said Rani Mukerji is an actor par excellence Anupama Chopra of Hindustan Times also gave the film 4/5 stars, saying "Bombay Talkies is a unique experiment that works very well. The collaboration between four leading directors suggests a confidence that was rare in the industry even a decade ago. I believe that things can only get better from here on." Tushar Joshi gave the film 3.5/5 stars, adding that "Bombay Talkies is a format that needs to be praised for its concept. The sequencing of the stories works and the pace is swift, never showing signs of lethargy. If this was a tribute to 100 years of cinema, then we need to have an array of directors from different genres pay such homages more often." Similarly, Sukanya Verma gave the 3.5/5 stars, concluding that "Bombay Talkies is an absorbing ode to the language of cinema that is part of our collective system." As for performances, she noted that "it’s Rani Mukerji’s flawless artistry as an imprisoned soul wearing a mark of normalcy which elevates the emotional core of Johar’s story." The duo of Banerjee-Nawazuddin creates magic on the screen in 30 mins, adapting Satyajit Ray's short story, "Patol Babu, Film Star."

== Awards and nominations ==
- Karan Johar's segment "Ajeeb Dastaan Hai Yeh" fetched Queer Palm nomination at the 2013 Cannes Film Festival.

== Soundtrack ==
The music of the film is composed by Amit Trivedi with lyrics written by Amitabh Bhattacharya and Swanand Kirkire. "Apna Bombay Talkies" is the only song which brings legendary singers of 90s Kavita Krishnamurthy, Alka Yagnik, Kumar Sanu, Udit Narayan, Sadhana Sargam and Abhijeet together for the first time that too with veteran singer S. P. Balasubrahmanyam. The song features all the singers according to the respective actors they have sung most of their hit numbers making this song one of its kind.

== Sequel ==
The sequel for Bombay Talkies, Lust Stories was released on Netflix on 15 June 2018. It has been co-produced by Ronnie Screwvala and Ashi Dua. Karan Johar's segment stars Vicky Kaushal, Kiara Advani, and Neha Dhupia and concluded filming in December 2017. Zoya Akhtar's segment stars Bhumi Pednekar and Rasika Dugal, Dibakar Banerjee’s short stars Manisha Koirala and Sanjay Kapoor, and Anurag Kashyap’s film stars Radhika Apte and Akash Thoser.
