= RSVP Movies =

Indian film production company

- Type: Private
- Industry: Entertainment
- Predecessor: UTV Motion Pictures
- Founded: 2017
- Founder: Ronnie Screwvala
- Headquarters: Mumbai, Maharashtra, India
- Key people: Ronnie Screwvala
- Products: Film production
- Owner: Ronnie Screwvala
- Website: RSVP Movies

RSVP Movies is an Indian film production and distribution company established by Ronnie Screwvala in 2017.

== History ==
In 2017, Ronnie Screwvala entered the entertainment business with RSVP after his exit from UTV Motion Pictures and produced Love per Square Foot which was digitally released on Netflix in 2018.

Love per Square Foot, starring Vicky Kaushal and Angira Dhar, was the first film produced under RSVP's banner. The film was released on 14 February 2018 and was screened at Beijing International Film Festival 2019. RSVP produced Lust Stories (2018), an anthology film consisting of four short films from four directors, Anurag Kashyap, Zoya Akhtar, Dibakar Banerjee, and Karan Johar. The film has an ensemble cast including Radhika Apte, Bhumi Pednekar, Kiara Advani, Manisha Koirala, Vicky Kaushal and Sanjay Kapoor.

In 2018, RSVP produced Akarsh Khurana's directorial debut Karwaan (2018), starring Irrfan Khan, Dulquer Salmaan and Mithila Palkar. RSVP collaborated with Siddharth Roy Kapur’s Roy Kapur Films for Pihu (2017), which premiered at 2017 International Film Festival of India and screened at the Fajr International Film Festival. The film was released theatrically in November 2018.

RSVP collaborated with Guy in the Sky Pictures and produced Kedarnath (2018) starring Sushant Singh Rajput and Sara Ali Khan. RSVP produced the directorial debut of Aditya Dhar, Uri: The Surgical Strike (2019), starring Vicky Kaushal, Paresh Rawal, Mohit Raina, and Yami Gautam. The film got listed in the top ten Hindi films with the highest domestic net collection and won four National Film Awards including Best Director and Best Actor. In 2019, RSVP produced Sonchiriya, directed by Abhishek Chaubey and starring Sushant Singh Rajput, Bhumi Pednekar, Manoj Bajpayee, Ranvir Shorey and Ashutosh Rana. Vasan Bala's Mard Ko Dard Nahi Hota (2019) starring Abhimanyu Dassani and Radhika Madan was also produced under RSVP's banner. The film premiered at Midnight Madness section of 2018 Toronto International Film Festival and won the People's Choice Award. The film was also screened at 2018 JIO Mumbai Academy of the Moving Image Film Festival.

The Sky Is Pink starring Priyanka Chopra Jonas, Farhan Akhtar, and Zaira Wasim which is going to be premiered at Toronto International Film Festival 2019, Bhangra Paa Le featuring Sunny Kaushal and Raat Akeli Hai starring Nawazuddin Siddiqui, Radhika Apte, and Shweta Tripathi Sharma are some of the acclaimed films. RSVP has also announced three more projects, Natkhat, a short film co-produced with Vidya Balan, Rashmi Rocket, starring Taapsee Pannu and directed by Akarsh Khurana and Sam Bahadur starring Vicky Kaushal and directed by Meghna Gulzar and Tejas starring Kangana Ranaut. In 2021, the company produced its first Telugu film Pitta Kathalu along with Flying Unicorn Entertainment.

== Filmography ==
Key
†	Denotes films that have not yet been released

Feature Films
Year	Title	Language	Director(s)	Notes	Ref
2018	Love per Square Foot	Hindi	Anand Tiwari	Released on Netflix	
2018	Lust Stories	Hindi	Anurag Kashyap; Zoya Akhtar; Dibakar Banerjee; Karan Johar	Anthology Film; Released on Netflix	
2018	Karwaan	Hindi	Akarsh Khurana		
2018	Pihu	Hindi	Vinod Kapri		
2018	Kedarnath	Hindi	Abhishek Kapoor		
2019	Uri: The Surgical Strike	Hindi	Aditya Dhar		
2019	Sonchiriya	Hindi	Abhishek Chaubey		
2019	Mard Ko Dard Nahi Hota	Hindi	Vasan Bala		
2019	The Sky Is Pink	Hindi	Shonali Bose		
2020	Ghost Stories	Hindi	Anurag Kashyap; Zoya Akhtar; Dibakar Banerjee; Karan Johar	Anthology Film; Released on Netflix	
2020	Bhangra Paa Le	Hindi	Sneha Taurani		
2020	Natkhat	Hindi	Shaan Vyas	Short Film	
2020	Raat Akeli Hai	Hindi	Honey Trehan	Released on Netflix	
2020	Paava Kadhaigal	Tamil	Sudha Kongara; Gautham Vasudev Menon; Vetrimaaran; Vignesh Shivan	Anthology Films; Released on Netflix	
2021	Pitta Kathalu	Telugu	Nag Ashwin; B. V. Nandini Reddy; Tharun Bhascker; Sankalp Reddy	Anthology Films; Released on Netflix	
2021	Ankahi Kahaniya	Hindi	Ashwiny Iyer Tiwari; Abhishek Chaubey; Saket Chaudhary	Anthology Films; Released on Netflix	
2021	Rashmi Rocket	Hindi	Akarsh Khurana	Released on ZEE5	
2021	Dhamaka	Hindi	Ram Madhvani	Released on Netflix	
2022	A Thursday	Hindi	Behzad Khambata	Released on JioHotstar	
2022	Wonder Women	English	Anjali Menon	Released on SonyLIV	
2023	Mission Majnu	Hindi	Shantanu Bagchi	Released on Netflix	
2023	Chhatriwali	Hindi	Tejas Deoskar	Released on ZEE5	
2023	Lust Stories 2	Hindi	Konkona Sen Sharma; R. Balki; Sujoy Ghosh; Amit Ravindernath Sharma	Anthology Film; Released on Netflix	
2023	Tarla	Hindi	Piyush Gupta	Released on ZEE5	
2023	Tumse Na Ho Payega	Hindi	Abhishek Sinha	Released on JioHotstar	
2023	Tejas	Hindi	Sarvesh Mewara		
2023	Pippa	Hindi	Raja Krishna Menon	Released on Amazon Prime Video	
2023	Sam Bahadur	Hindi	Meghna Gulzar		
2024	Ullozhukku	Malayalam	Christo Tomy		
2024	Kakuda	Hindi	Aditya Sarpotdar	Released on ZEE5	
2024	Love, Sitara	Hindi	Vandana Kataria	Released on ZEE5	
2024	Despatch	Hindi	Kanu Behl	Released on ZEE5	
2025	Azaad	Hindi	Abhishek Kapoor		
2025	Yuva Sapno Ka Safar	Hindi	Nitya Mehra; Alankrita Srivastava; Anjali Menon; Rima Das; Karan Kapadia; K. M. Ayappa; Suparn Verma; Razneesh “Razy” Ghai	Anthology Film; Released on Waves OTT	
2025	Raat Akeli Hai: The Bansal Murders	Hindi	Honey Trehan	Released on Netflix	
2026	Satluj	Hindi	Honey Trehan	Released on ZEE5	
2026	Lust Stories 3	Hindi	Kiran Rao; Vikramaditya Motwane; Shakun Batra; Vishal Bhardwaj	Anthology Film; Released on Netflix	

Web series
Year	Title	Director(s)	Network	Notes
2020–present	Mismatched	Akarsh Khurana; Nipun Dharmadhikari	Netflix	4 Seasons
2024	Pill	Raj Kumar Gupta	JioHotstar	1 Season
TBA	Panthers †	Rensil D'Silva	TBA	
