= Dancing with Demons =

Indian boxing drama novel

- First edition
- Author: Nidhie Sharma
- Language: English
- Genre: Drama/fiction
- Published: 2014
- Publisher: Harlequin Imprint of Harper Collins
- Publication place: India
- Media type: Print media
- Pages: 296
- ISBN: 935106493X

Dancing with Demons is a boxing drama novel written by Indian filmmaker and screenwriter Nidhie Sharma and published in 2014. The book is India's first boxing fiction novel and revolves around two fallen souls who need to defeat their inner demons to become the people they were destined to be.

== Plot ==
Twenty four year old boxer Karan Pratap Singh is on the brink of winning the Heavy weight Boxing Championship, when during the last round of the Boxing finals, he nearly bludgeons his opponent to death in an uncontrolled fit of rage. In that moment, he loses everything he's worked for and is banned from boxing for four years. The four years of his sporting career, along with his coach and mentor Jerry Fernandez, are lost to a rage that he cannot explain. His fall from glory seems fueled by ruthless arrogance and an anger management problem. That, however, is simply symptomatic of a deeper issue. Buried under layers of his fractured subconscious lies a childhood secret, a demon he needs to vanquish, but cannot come to terms with. Karan must vanquish these demons to become the boxer he was meant to be. He must atone and do what it takes to get back into the ring.

The story also introduces Sonia Kapoor, a young woman with a secret that haunts her but for which she seemingly feels no guilt. Sonia arrives in Mumbai on a stormy night, hoping to disappear along with her secret in the city. She hopes that Mumbai will provide her with anonymity and keep her past hidden. Her past eventually catches up with her.

When fate throws Karan and Sonia together in Mumbai, their inner demons and pasts collide and stir up trouble in their fragile and uncertain present. Is it possible to outrun one's past? And is redemption really possible without forgiveness?

== Book launch and film adaptation ==
The boxing redemption saga will be adapted into a Hindi film. Dancing with Demons was launched and the film announced on 18 November 2014, in an event held in Mumbai which was attended by Bollywood actor Arunoday Singh and filmmaker Sudhir Mishra.

== Critical reception ==
The book is critically acclaimed by several Indian authors. News 18 described the book as "it's promising and keeps you entertained throughout." Writing in Deccan Chronicle Anjana Basu states, "a first for its boxing background and for its romantic pair who are so at odds that it seems unlikely that they will ever manage to get together and find true love in a world of lies." She further adds "Strongly visual and action packed, it’s hardly surprising that the author plans to make it into a film."
