= Lust Stories 3 =

2026 Indian anthology film

- Official release poster
- Directed by: Vikramaditya Motwane; Kiran Rao; Shakun Batra; Vishal Bhardwaj
- Produced by: Ronnie Screwvala; Ashi Dua Sara
- Starring: Radhika Apte; Konkona Sen Sharma; Vijay Varma; Abhishek Banerjee; Gurfateh Pirzada; Sana Thampi; Ali Fazal; Radhika Madan; Aditi Rao Hydari; Siddharth
- Music by: Vishal Bhardwaj; Ram Sampath; Sneha Khanwalkar; Yash Sahai
- Production companies: RSVP Movies; Flying Unicorn Entertainment
- Distributed by: Netflix
- Release date: 18 September 2026
- Running time: 165 minutes
- Country: India
- Language: Hindi

Lust Stories 3 is a 2026 Indian Hindi-language anthology film, and third installment of Lust Stories, consisting of four short film segments directed by Vikramaditya Motwane, Kiran Rao, Shakun Batra and Vishal Bhardwaj. Produced by Ronnie Screwvala of RSVP Movies and Ashi Dua Sara of Flying Unicorn Entertainment, the film has an ensemble cast including Radhika Apte, Konkona Sen Sharma, Vijay Varma, Abhishek Banerjee, Gurfateh Pirzada, Sana Thampi, Ali Fazal, Radhika Madan, Aditi Rao Hydari and Siddharth. The film premiered on Netflix on 18 September 2026.

== Plot ==
=== Swinging (Vikramaditya Motwane) ===
Padma and Shonali are married women whose sex lives with their husbands have stalled in their 40s. A K-drama about swinging couples gives them the idea to swap their husbands during a weekend getaway to Khandala. At the resort, Shonali bribes the hotel manager, David, to play risque games to help couples bond with each others' partners. Shonali pairs up with Padma's husband, Hemant, while Padma pairs up with Shonali's husband, Debu. Debu and Padma bond effortlessly, though Shonali has a harder time seducing Hemant. She learns that Padma has been lying to her about Hemant's likes and dislikes out of jealousy. Despite this, the women go partying together at the in-house dance venue, where they are joined by their respective husbands. Hemant and Shonali dance freely, while Padma calls it a night. Hemant falls while dancing and injures himself, and has to be rushed to the hospital. Shonali goes looking for Padma, but finds her in bed with Debu right before they are about to have sex. Padma accompanies Hemant for treatment in an ambulance, where the couple discover their lost spark and become intimate again. Meanwhile, Shonali leaves Debu alone in their room after an argument. She goes back to the dance floor to enjoy the music, but is joined by the hotel manager, David.

=== Pizza delivery guy (Kiran Rao) ===
Lisa is a nail artist who lives alone in an apartment in Mumbai. She meets and hooks up with a pizza delivery guy, Karan, who works at the pizza shop across the street from her salon. They engage in a casual relationship, but Lisa soon discovers that Karan is a drug dealer, who has been using her apartment to hide drugs along with large sums of money. One afternoon, Lisa is informed by her building's security guard that Karan is in her apartment despite her being away. She quickly comes home, only to realise the man is actually Karan's identical twin brother, Arjun. Arjun is there to collect the drug money to repay their supplier. Knowing their secret, Lisa seduces him so Arjun fails to leave with the cash. Lisa carries on a clandestine affair with both brothers, only to secretly abscond with the money after a week. Karan and Arjun are stunned and flee the city, fearing retribution from their supplier. En route, Karan learns that Arjun had been sleeping with Lisa too, leading to a fight between them.

=== Quarrelling ex-lovers (Shakun Batra) ===
Varun and Sailee are about to divorce after five years of marriage. They have been living separately, but Sailee comes over to their shared apartment to collect her belongings. The two argue over a wall painting, but this ends up resolving in angry sex. When the couple are inadvertently interrupted by Varun's housemaid, Sailee takes off in a fit of rage with the wall painting, prompting their lawyers to ask them to maintain civility for an amicable separation. Despite this, Varun and Sailee continue meeting to have sex. They discuss this with their couples' therapist, but he explains their encounters as a 'dopamine fix'. On the night Varun is vacating their apartment, Sailee visits him again to return the painting. They talk candidly about their failed marriage, and end up bonding over shared trauma and mistakes each committed. Finally, they visit the court for their final hearing walking hand-in-hand together as friends.

=== Erotica (Vishal Bhardwaj) ===
In 1987, Saira is completing her thesis on Urdu literature in Hyderabad, while also teaching at the all-girls college. Her students are obssessed with the erotic English novels of Macy & Ben and will not stop discussing them in class. To prove to them that Urdu is just as versatile as English for writing about sex, Saira takes up authoring erotic stories in her college notebook. She reluctantly circulates them to her female students, who take turns reading them. Her students are enthralled, but the book soon goes missing from one of their bags. Fearing she will be outed as the author of such ‘vulgar’ content, Saira refuses to leave the house for a month. She also disengages in the bedroom, leaving her husband Badru perplexed about her sudden lack of interest in sex. When Saira resumes college, she learns that her stories have become published under a pseudonym with the title, Chulbuli Begum. The book has quickly become a bestseller, as it teaches men in their repressed society about sex and female desires. Saira decides to come clean about the book to Badru, but he claims to having read the book himself. Being a doctor, he finds the content educational, not objectionable, and has been trying to get Saira to read snippets from it as well to improve her mood. Feeling supported by him at last, Saira rediscovers her sex drive and the couple become intimate again after a prolonged abstinence.

== Cast ==
=== Swinging ===
- Radhika Apte as Padma
- Konkona Sen Sharma as Shonali Ghosh
- Vijay Varma as Hemant, Padma's husband
- Abhishek Banerjee as Debendu Ghosh, Shonali's husband

=== Pizza delivery guy ===
- Gurfateh Pirzada in dual roles as
  - Karan, Arjun's twin brother
  - Arjun, Karan's twin brother
- Sana Thampi as Lisa
- Poonam Mathur as Karan and Arjun's mother

=== Quarrelling ex-lovers ===
- Ali Fazal as Varun, Sailee's husband
- Radhika Madan as Sailee, Varun's wife
- Vijay Maurya as Ravi uncle
- Rajat Kapoor as Therapist

=== Erotica ===
- Aditi Rao Hydari as Saira, Badru's wife
- Siddharth as Dr. Badru, Saira's husband
- Gajraj Rao as Abbujaan, Badru's father
- Nivedita Bhargava as Guide madam
- Bhagyashree Tarke as Rajjo, student at Saira's college
- Vaishali Bisht as Rajjo's mother
- Alok Jain as Rajjo's father

== Production ==
=== Development ===
The film was officially commissioned by Netflix, with Vikramaditya Motwane, Kiran Rao, Shakun Batra and Vishal Bhardwaj serving as director, while RSVP Movies and Flying Unicorn Entertainment managed the production.

=== Casting ===
In May 2025, it was reported that Konkona Sen Sharma and Radhika Apte were reportedly cast to appear. Radhika Madan auditioned for the role opposite Ali Fazal in Shakun Batra's segment.

=== Filming ===
Netflix confirmed that the film has entered post-production phase.

== Music ==
Part 4

Released on 10 September 2026
No.	Title	Artist(s)	Length
1.	"Aaye Miyan Khat-Pat"	Rekha Bhardwaj, Vishal Bhardwaj	2:47

Part 1

Released on 20 September 2026
No.	Title	Artist(s)	Length
1.	"Puranpoli"	Sneha Khanwalkar, Kratex, Ganesh Chandanshive	2:47
2.	"Swing Swing"	Sneha Khanwalkar, Han Areum	2:40
3.	"Tu Parwana"	Sneha Khanwalkar, Zoheb Khan	4:26
4.	"Teri Bhabhi"	Shreya Gupta	1:18

Part 2

Released on 22 September 2026
No.	Title	Artist(s)	Length
1.	"Vaari Vaari"	Sona Mohapatra, Koustuv Ghosh, Ram Sampath	3:11
2.	"Zhopu Nako"	Manas Dhiwar, Ram Sampath	2:24
3.	"Lamha Thame"	Ram Sampath, Meenal Jain, Devansh Vaidya	2:52

Part 3

Released on 23 September 2026
No.	Title	Artist(s)	Length
1.	"Jo Bhi Ho"	Yash Sahai	2:46
2.	"Begum aur Pyada"	Yash Sahai	2:06
3.	"Yeh Raste"	Yash Sahai	1:37

== Release ==
In February 2026, Netflix revealed its slate lineup for 2026. The first look of the film was released on 3 February 2026, followed by the trailer on 9 September 2026.

The film was made available to stream on Netflix on 18 September 2026.

== Reception ==
On the review aggregator website Rotten Tomatoes, 87% of 15 critics' reviews are positive, with an average rating of 6.6/10.

Shubhra Gupta of The Indian Express gave 3 stars out of 5 and wrote that "For what it’s worth, these lust stories may be uneven, but they are enjoyable all the same." Tanisha Bhattacharya of NDTV gave 3 stars out of 5 and said that "Lust Stories 3 makes for the perfect guilty-pleasure watch over the weekend." Nandini Ramnath of Scroll.in stated that "Lust Stories 3 is still in the sort-of-safe to be watched at work, opting to be mildly risky rather than boldly risque."

Archika Khurana of The Times of India gave 3 stars out of 5 and said that "It may not consistently match the impact of its predecessors, but its sincerity and willingness to start conversations about intimacy and female pleasure make Lust Stories 3 a watchable addition to the series." Sukanya Verma of Rediff.com rated it 3.5/5 stars and said that "Lust Stories 3 continues its tradition of offering attractively-wrapped pieces of provocation in a box. Only this time, it doesn't dwell too deep into the emotions of sex and enjoys it for what it is." Anuj Kumar of The Hindu writes that "A mirror to modern relationships, the franchise's third instalment sheds its past shock value for the disturbing terrain of emotional isolation."
