= Ghost Stories (2020 film) =

2020 Indian anthology film

- Official release poster
- Directed by: Karan Johar; Dibakar Banerjee; Zoya Akhtar; Anurag Kashyap
- Written by: Karan Johar; Dibakar Banerjee; Zoya Akhtar; Isha Luthra; Avinash Sampath
- Produced by: Ronnie Screwvala; Ashi Dua
- Starring: Sobhita Dhulipala; Mrunal Thakur; Avinash Tiwary; Janhvi Kapoor; Surekha Sikri; Raghuvir Yadav; Gulshan Devaiah; Pavail Gulati; Anish Bamne
- Cinematography: Sylvester Fonseca; Tanay Satam; Kamaljeet Negi; Manu Anand; Mitesh Mirchandani; Ranjan Palit
- Music by: Score: Peji Shahkoti; Songs: Peji Shahkoti; Madan Mohan
- Production companies: RSVP Movies; Flying Unicorn Entertainment
- Distributed by: Netflix
- Release date: 1 January 2020
- Running time: 144 minutes
- Country: India
- Language: Hindi

Ghost Stories is a 2020 Indian Hindi-language anthology horror film, consisting of four short film segments directed by Karan Johar, Dibakar Banerjee, Zoya Akhtar, and Anurag Kashyap. It is co-produced by Ronnie Screwvala and Ashi Dua under their production banner RSVP Movies and Flying Unicorn Entertainment respectively. The film features an ensemble cast, including Mrunal Thakur, Avinash Tiwary, Janhvi Kapoor, Raghuvir Yadav, Sobhita Dhulipala, Vijay Varma, and Pavail Gulati. It was released on Netflix on 1 January 2020.

Ghost Stories is the third of three anthology films from Johar, Banerjee, Akhtar, and Kashyap. It was preceded by Bombay Talkies in 2013 and Lust Stories in 2018, the latter also being released on Netflix.

== Plot ==
=== Zoya Akhtar ===
Sameera, a young nurse, arrives to take care of an ailing bedridden elderly lady, Mrs. Malik in a desolate house. The former is needy, clutching at a reluctant lover Guddu; the latter, a stunner in her time. The lady's son is supposed to be taking care of the old mother for the duration between the change of nurses, but he is not around. Mrs. Malik tells Sameera that her son is sleeping in the next room, but no one is there. Later, it is revealed that her son left her alone for five days and she died of starvation three days earlier. The camera moves away from a shocked Sameera.

=== Anurag Kashyap ===
The story revolves around a pregnant woman named Neha who babysits her late sister's child, Ansh. The obsessive affection of the boy and paranoia of a childless young woman assume terrifying proportions. Neha's mental illness begins to blur the line between delusion and reality.

=== Dibakar Banerjee ===
A man arrives in a small town known as, Bees-ghara, to find it empty, except for a young boy and a girl. He is told that everyone has been eaten by the girl's father who is the councilman of Sau-ghara, the big town. At first, the man refuses to believe them, but when he tries to go out, he encounters a zombie woman who attacks him. The boy rescues him, and back in the safe house, he decides to save the children and alert the local authorities. When he gets out and enters a school, he sees the blind principal behaving strangely. The principal suddenly runs away. The children explain that some people, in order to save themselves from getting eaten, started eating others too as the creatures do not eat those who also eat human flesh. As the man watches, the school principal screams and convulses on the ground. The girl's father, who resembles a hairy humanoid creature enters the school room. The creature's poor vision makes it unable to detect the presence of the man and the children until the girl, overcome by love for her father, goes near him only to be killed and eaten by him. The other two, stunned, do not move for a day, and the monster leaves. The boy has an idea that they take the blood from the girl's remains and cover their faces with it so that the zombies will believe that they too are flesh-eaters and let them go. The entire town center is under surveillance by the girl's father and upon seeing the pair, he checks them personally. He grows suspicious of the boy, who in reaction, eats some of the flesh of the girl. The monster turns to the man, who remains still so as to be unseen, but gets scared and starts running, resulting in him being chased by the eaters. On his way, he falls into a pit trap. He is thrown the girl's hand so that he can demonstrate he is one of them. The man refuses to do so and screams as the girl's father pounces on him, only to wake up from what is supposedly a dream. The man is then confused as he wakes up in the same trap he fell into and runs towards Bees-ghara. Finding the place deserted and burning, he assumes the worst and cries that he failed to save the children. At the same time a car comes, full of people who bear a striking resemblance to the eaters. The man is then taken in a jeep by them, and they tell him that they are people of Sau-ghara and that nobody lives in Bees-ghara after they burned it down because it was a very inferior place.

=== Karan Johar ===
Ira agrees to have an arranged marriage with the handsome and wealthy Dhruv who dwells in a house his grandmother built. On their wedding night, she sees her husband seemingly talking to the grandmother who died 20 years ago. Each night after that, the grandmother comes to bid good night to Dhruv, who seems to be the only one who can see her.

In spite of being an adult, he enjoys playing peek-a-boo with the dead grandmother. Ira questions the maid Shanti (Heeba Shah) and learns that Dhruv was once playing peek-a-boo with his grandmother and accidentally pushed her down the stairs. The grandmother was severely incapacitated and in terrible pain. Despite this, she would make it a point to visit Dhruv each night to wish him a good night. The conversation ends before Ira learns the circumstances of the grandmother's passing. One night, Ira gets tired of Dhruv's attachment to his dead grandmother and storms into her room, still preserved as a shrine to her and screams at the grandmother to leave them alone. The next day, at breakfast, Shanti helps Ira stir her oatmeal. Midway through breakfast, Ira starts having severe stomach cramps and is helped to her bed by Shanti. As Ira lies writhing in pain, Shanti completes their earlier conversation, telling Ira that the grandmother had begged Shanti to put an end to her pain. Being the obedient maid that she is, she mixed highly poisonous castor seeds into her breakfast; thereby, poisoning her to death. The viewer is led to understand that Shanti did the same for Ira. Ira wakes up in a brightly lit room and sees the grandmother hovering over her. Confused, Ira asks how it is that she can now see her. She lets Ira know that this is because Ira is now in her world, implying that Ira is dead. Ira then turns her head to see other human forms while the grandmother tells her that those are the others who, like Ira, did not believe in her presence.

== Cast ==
Zoya Akhtar

- Janhvi Kapoor as Sameera
- Surekha Sikri as Mrs. Malik
- Vijay Varma as Guddu

Anurag Kashyap

- Sobhita Dhulipala as Neha
- Sagar Arya as Neha's husband
- Zachary Braz as Ansh
- Pavail Gulati as Ansh's father

Dibakar Banerjee

- Sukant Goel as Visitor
- Aditya Shetty as Little Boy
- Eva Ameet Pardeshi as Little Girl
- Gulshan Devaiah as girl's Daddy

Karan Johar

- Mrunal Thakur as Irawati "Ira" Kapoor
- Avinash Tiwary as Dhruv
- Jyoti Subhash as Dhruv's Granny
- Kitu Gidwani as Dhruv's Mother
- Sumit Tandon as Dhruv's Father
- Namrata Chopra as Ira's Mother
- Kusha Kapila as Misha
- Shataf Figar as Ira's Father
- Heeba N Shah as Shanti

== Production ==
In April 2019, it was announced that Anurag Kashyap, Zoya Akhtar, Dibakar Banerjee, and Karan Johar will be reuniting again after Bombay Talkies and Lust Stories for a horror film for Netflix. In August, Akhtar began shooting for her segment with Vijay Varma and Janhvi Kapoor. In September, Kashyap began filming for his segment with Sobhita Dhulipala and Pavail Gulati. Mrunal Thakur and Avinash Tiwary have been cast for Johar's segment. Karan Johar found his story through a talent agency. Line producer Shiva Korner and production manager Arun Kumar started shooting for his segment of the anthology on 1 October 2019 in Goa.

== Soundtrack ==
The film score was composed and one song was guest-composed by Peji Shahkoti, while the rest of the songs were composed by Peji Shahkoti.

The lyrics were written by Shellee.

Ghost Stories

Soundtrack album by Peji Shahkoti
- Released: 1 January 2022 (Film)
- Recorded: 2019
- Studio: Netflix
- Genre: Feature Film soundtrack
- Language: Hindi
- Label: Sangeet Music

Track-List
No.	Title	Singer(s)	Length
1.	"Madhaniya"	Asees Kaur & Deedar Kaur
2.	"Mera Saaya"	Lata Mangeshkar

== Reception ==
On the review aggregator website Rotten Tomatoes, 36% of 11 critics' reviews are positive, with an average rating of 5/10. Saibal Chatterjee from NDTV rated the movie 2.5 stars out of 5 and wrote "Let alone genuine jump scares, the film does not even eke out moments that could be deemed spine-chilling".

Swetha Ramakrishnan rated the movie 3 stars out of on Firstpost and wrote "Dibakar Banerjee's political short film elevates an otherwise bland anthology that just isn't scary".
