= Vishal O Sharma =

Indian actor

Vishal Om Prakash
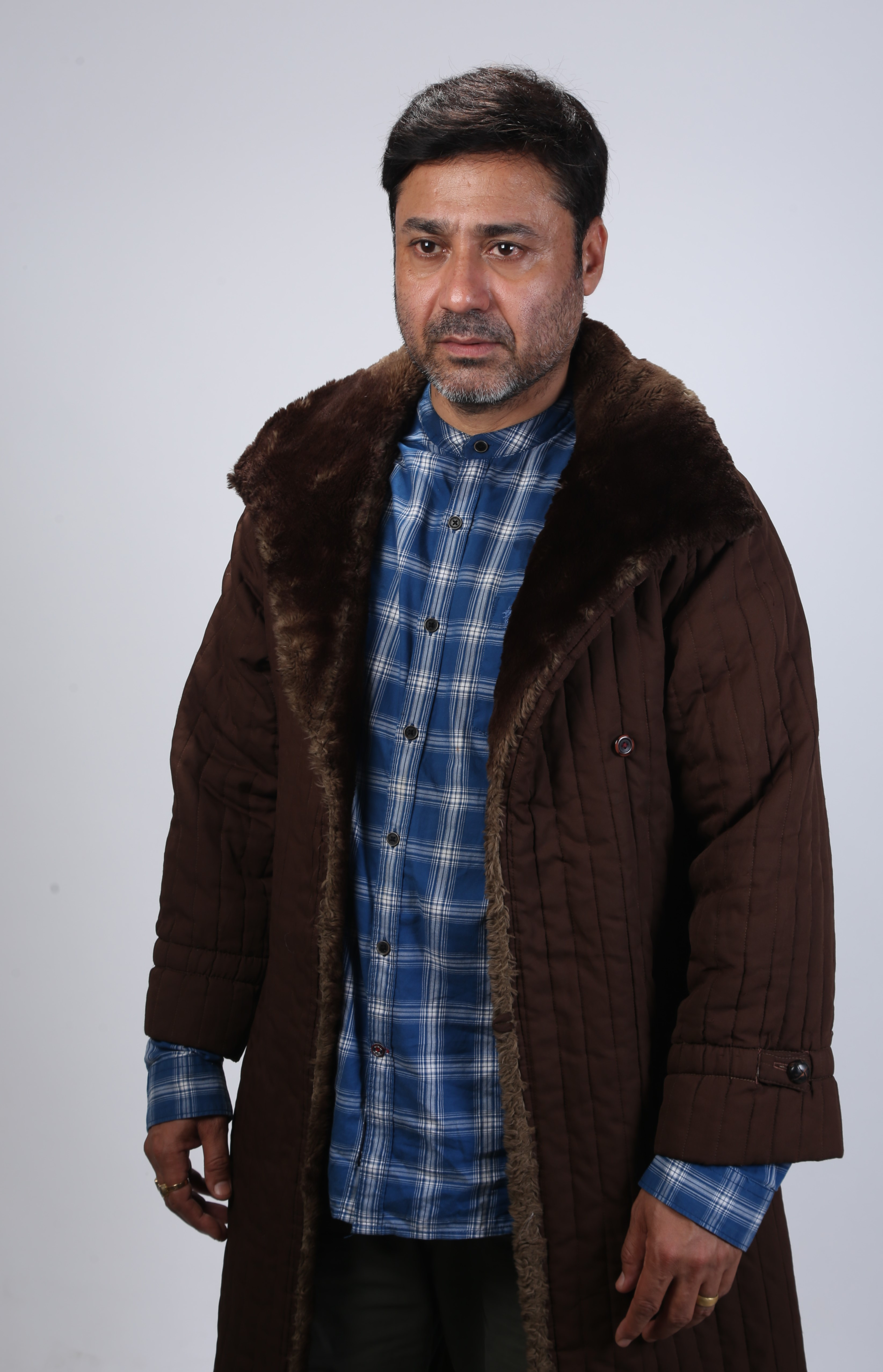
- Born: Lucknow, India
- Occupation: Actor
- Years active: 2004–present

Vishal Om Prakash (a.k.a. Vishal O Sharma) is an Indian actor. He has acted in over 50 films in Hindi, Tamil and Telugu films. His notable roles have included Kumar Deepak in the award winning Peepli Live.

== Personal life ==
Vishal O Sharma was born in Lucknow, India. He did his initial schooling in Gujarat and then moved to Lucknow where he studied at the Spring Dale School.

== Filmography ==
- Aasma (completed) as Nazeer
- 2023 Deceptive Diva
- 2023 Kaamdev
- 2023 Chor Nikal Ke Bhaga
- 2022 L.A.C.
- 2022 Love Hostel as Advocate Ashok Khanna
- 2021 My Client’s Wife as watchman
- 2019 One Night At Villa as Inspector Kuldeep Gomes
- 2019 Khandaani Shafakhana as Jhalla Halwai
- 2018 Bhawani Mandi Tesan
- 2018 Page 16 as Inspector Khurana
- 2017 Firangi as Pehelwan
- 2017 Daddy
- 2016 Lucknow Times as Fatey Singh
- 2015 India's Daughter as Vishal
- 2015 Guddu Rangeela
- 2014 Dikkulu Choodaku Ramayya
- 2013 Ek Bura Aadmi (completed) as Captain Ganesh
- 2013 Jolly LLB as Lawyer
- 2011 Looteri Dulhan TV series, as Diamond Singh
- 2010 Peepli Live as Kumar Deepak
- 2008 My Name Is Anthony Gonsalves as Shiraj Bhai
- 2007 Jab We Met as Aditya's lawyer
- 2007 Laaga Chunari Mein Daag Journey of a Woman as Doctor Ghosh (uncredited)
- 2004 Veer-Zaara
- 2004 Love in Nepal as Negi
