= Lust Stories =

2018 Indian anthology film

- Official release poster
- Directed by: Anurag Kashyap; Zoya Akhtar; Dibakar Banerjee; Karan Johar
- Produced by: Ronnie Screwvala; Ashi Dua
- Starring: Radhika Apte; Bhumi Pednekar; Neil Bhoopalam; Manisha Koirala; Kiara Advani; Vicky Kaushal; Akash Thosar; Neha Dhupia
- Cinematography: Sylvester Fonseca; Álvaro Gutiérrez; K. U. Mohanan; Mitesh Mirchandani
- Edited by: Nitesh Bhatia; Namrata Rao; Pooja Ladha Surti; Utsav Bhagat; Nitin Baid
- Music by: Background Score and Guest Composition: Sameer Uddin; Songs: Amit Trivedi; Tanishk-Vayu; Prateek Kuhad
- Production companies: RSVP Movies; Flying Unicorn Entertainment
- Distributed by: Netflix
- Release date: 15 June 2018 (India)
- Running time: 120 minutes
- Country: India
- Language: Hindi

Lust Stories is a 2018 Indian Hindi-language anthology film, consisting of four short film segments directed by Anurag Kashyap, Zoya Akhtar, Dibakar Banerjee, and Karan Johar and based on the concept of the 2013 anthology film Bombay Talkies. Co-produced by Ronnie Screwvala of RSVP and Ashi Dua of Flying Unicorn Entertainment, the film has an ensemble cast including Radhika Apte, Bhumi Pednekar, Manisha Koirala, Kiara Advani, Vicky Kaushal, Akash Thosar, Neha Dhupia and others.

Lust Stories is the second of three anthology films from Johar, Banerjee, Akhtar and Kashyap, being preceded by Bombay Talkies in 2013 and followed by Ghost Stories in 2020, the latter also being released on Netflix. The film was nominated for two Awards at the 47th International Emmy Awards; Best TV Movie or Miniseries and Best Actress for Apte. A sequel, Lust Stories 2, with segments directed by R. Balki, Konkona Sen Sharma, Amit Ravindernath Sharma, and Sujoy Ghosh, was released in 2023.

== Plot ==
Four short segments are presented linearly, each depicting sex and relationships inside a repressed society (director’s names in parenthesis).

=== Open marriage (Anurag Kashyap) ===
Kalindi is a college professor locked in a long-distance marriage with an older, more sexually-experienced husband, Mihir, who lives abroad. Encouraged to build her own sexual history separate from him, Kalindi engages in a casual encounter with Tejas, a virginal male student. Fearing attachment, she sidelines him while simultaneously pursuing a 'monogamous' relationship with a colleague, Neeraj. Neeraj and Kalindi have awkward sex, causing her to abruptly terminate their relationship. She attempts to insert herself back into Tejas' life, despite him moving on to a new romance with his classmate, Natasha. Consumed by jealousy, Kalindi tracks the couple to sabotage their private moments. This culminates in her breaking into Tejas' apartment, where she finds him alone. Misinterpreting her erratic behaviour as a sign of affection, Tejas promises to abandon Natasha to be with her. Seeing him available again, Kalindi reveals that she’s married and rejects him, leaving him again in a confused state.

=== Sex with the maid (Zoya Akhtar) ===
Ajit is a bachelor who shares a physical relationship with his housemaid, Sudha. Their interactions usually involve them having sex on his bed, after which Sudha resumes her house-cleaning duties. Despite their dissimilar backgrounds, Sudha secretly harbours romantic interest in Ajit. This changes when Ajit’s parents arrive to stay with him. Ajit and Sudha avoid interacting in their presence. Later, his parents host another similarly middle-class family who bring a marriage proposal for Ajit with their daughter. As the parents chat in the living room, Ajit spends time with his prospective fiancée in his room. Sudha spies them sitting close together on his bed, as Ajit initiates intimacy between them to build camaraderie. Confronted with the abrupt end of their relationship, Sudha finishes her chores. Before she leaves, Ajit’s mother passes out sweets to celebrate Ajit's engagement and Sudha accepts one.

=== An extramarital affair (Dibakar Banerjee) ===
Reena is a corporate banker trapped in a stagnant marriage with her husband, Salman. For three years, she has maintained a deeply emotional, clandestine extramarital affair with Salman’s closest friend, Sudhir. The stability of their secret is threatened during one of Reena's visits to Sudhir's residence, where Sudhir reveals that a suspicious Salman has voiced concerns regarding his wife's potential infidelity. Panic ensues, prompting a resolute Reena to suggest that they confess the truth to Salman so they can finally live together openly. She is deeply disheartened by Sudhir’s defensive reaction, as he clearly views abandoning his social circle and betraying his friend as an impossibility.

Taking matters into her own hands, Reena summons Salman to Sudhir's home. She directly confronts her husband, stating that she is profoundly unhappy in their marriage and feels reduced to a maternal caretaker for his children rather than a romantic partner. Once she confesses the three-year duration of her affair with Sudhir, a devastated Salman breaks down, begging her to remain with the family for the sake of their children. Wrapped in immense guilt and emotional exhaustion, Reena yields; later that evening, she and Salman engage in a grief-stricken sexual encounter. The following morning, Reena meets Sudhir one final time to sever ties. She informs him that Salman is fully aware of the betrayal and demands the termination of the affair, but explicitly instructs Sudhir that he must never let Salman know that they are aware of his discovery. Terminating the relationship permanently, Reena departs alongside her husband.

=== Self-satisfaction (Karan Johar) ===
Megha is a school teacher who is newly married to Paras, an office worker. Although Paras is doting and attentive, he finishes prematurely during sex and fails to satisfy her. Megha’s dissatisfaction is exacerbated by the family’s pressure that she bear a child soon. Megha confides in her colleague, Rekha, who suggests using a remote-controlled vibrator. Megha brings home the device and starts experimenting with it. Before she can climax, she is distracted by a commotion in the living room and leaves the device inside her. Paras' grandmother discovers the remote control and starts fiddling with it. The device increases in intensity, causing Megha to experience a highly visible orgasm in front of her in-laws. Scandalized, Paras' mother demands the couple divorce. A month later, the two meet secretly at a cafe after living separately. Unwilling to legally separate, Paras accepts to pay more attention to Megha's physical needs as well if they are to reconcile. They share a quiet moment of hope together over ice cream.

== Cast ==
=== Open marriage ===
- Radhika Apte as Kalindi Dasgupta
- Akash Thosar as Tejas Bhave
- Ridhi Khakhar as Natasha Thakral
- Randeep Jha as Neeraj Choudhry
- Varadha as Mihir Dasgupta

=== Sex with the maid ===
- Bhumi Pednekar as Sudha Maheshwari
- Neil Bhoopalam as Ajit Khanna
- Nikita Dutta as Rukmini Sonkari
- Rasika Duggal as Sonalika Atiharan

=== An extramarital affair ===
- Manisha Koirala as Reena Bahl
- Jaideep Ahlawat as Sudhir
- Sanjay Kapoor as Salman Ahmed Bahl

=== Self-satisfaction ===
- Kiara Advani as Megha Upadhyay
- Vicky Kaushal as Paras Upadhyay
- Neha Dhupia as Rekha

== Production ==
Lust Stories is developed as a sequel to the 2013 anthology film Bombay Talkies. It has been co-produced by Ronnie Screwvala and Ashi Dua under the label of their respective production companies RSVP and Flying Unicorn Entertainment. The four segments of the anthology film have been directed by Anurag Kashyap, Zoya Akhtar and Dibakar Banerjee and Karan Johar respectively.

== Release ==
The international distribution rights for Lust Stories were acquired by Netflix. The film was released on Netflix on 15 June 2018.

== Soundtrack ==
The film score was composed and one song was guest-composed by Sameer Uddin, while rest of the songs were composed by Amit Trivedi, Tanishk-Vayu and Prateek Kuhad.

The lyrics were written by Shellee, Kumar Suryavanshi, Prateek Kuhad and Tanishk-Vayu.

Lust Stories

Soundtrack album by Tanishk-Vayu, Sameer Uddin Amit Trivedi & Prateek Kuhad
- Released: 15 June 2018 (Film)
- Recorded: 2018
- Studio: Netflix
- Genre: Feature Film soundtrack
- Length: 16:00
- Language: Hindi
- Label: Sangeet Music
- Producer: Tanishk Bagchi

Official audio
- Lust Stories - Full Album on YouTube

Track-List
No.	Title	Singer(s)	Length
1.	"Opening Credits Theme"	Sameeruddin	2:14
2.	"Tune Kaha"	Prateek Kuhad	3:41
3.	"Motorcycle"	Shashaa Tirupati	1:24
4.	"Ice-cream"	Various Artists	1:12
5.	"Dilli Waale"	Neha Bhasin	0:43
6.	"Jugni"	Vijay Yamla	2:37
7.	"End Credits"	Various Artists	4:09
Total length:			16:00

== Reception ==
On the review aggregator website Rotten Tomatoes, 100% of 12 critics' reviews are positive, with an average rating of 7.3/10.

Lust Stories delightfully pushes boundaries to tell real stories about real women, who are unapologetic in their imperfections and desires, and go about mending their heart strings the best they can. Lust after all, is never too far from the other L-word. —Suktara Ghosh, in her June, 2018 review for The Quint

Critics praised the film's portrayal of women and its exploration of female sexuality, a subject which has been rarely dealt with in Indian films. Film critic Alaka Sahani used the metaphor of a woman's body is draped in a dupatta while discussing the sheltered sexuality of women in general, a theme that took a central position in the narrative; she praised the handling of the subject matter as clinical in the subversion of such regressive stereotypes associated with women who have an active sex life as the presumably amorous "vamps" in the Indian film industry. Kiara Advani's masturbation scene in the film, using a vibrator, was praised for its frank portrayal of women's sexuality.

Mridula R of The News Minute echoed the sentiment as she praised the film's novelty in the honest portrayal of women, their "liberation, thoughts, [and] decisions". Others were also appreciative of the "glorious women [who] stubbornly and strikingly hold the reins" and the "sometimes not likeable, but definitely relatable women who usually elude our screens". Commentators responded positively to subtlety in the film's use of female protagonists; they were especially impressed by the fact that all of the stories had female protagonists "without being obnoxious about it", how they were wielded "to tell stories from a uniquely different perspective" and how it is a befitting slap on the face of India's morality preachers as an extremely contemporary take on — not sex in India — but on the majority's perception on how it must be represented in culture.

== Sequel ==
Lust Stories 2 is a 2023 Indian Hindi-language anthology film, second installment of Lust Stories, consisting of four short film segments directed by R Balki, Konkona Sen Sharma, Amit Ravindernath Sharma and Sujoy Ghosh. Co-produced by Ronnie Screwvala of RSVP and Ashi Dua of Flying Unicorn Entertainment, the film has an ensemble cast including Tamannaah Bhatia, Kajol, Mrunal Thakur, Amruta Subhash, Angad Bedi, Kumud Mishra, Neena Gupta, Tillotama Shome, Vijay Varma and others.

Lust Stories 3 is a 2026 Indian Hindi-language anthology film, third installment of Lust Stories, consisting of four short film segments directed by Vikramaditya Motwane, Kiran Rao, Shakun Batra and Vishal Bhardwaj. Co-produced by Ronnie Screwvala of RSVP and Ashi Dua of Flying Unicorn Entertainment, the film has an ensemble cast including Radhika Apte, Konkona Sen Sharma, Vijay Varma, Abhishek Banerjee, Gurfateh Pirzada, Sana Thampi, Ali Fazal, Radhika Madan, Aditi Rao Hydari and Siddharth and others.
