= Ek Bura Aadmi =

- Directed by: Ishraq Shah
- Screenplay by: Yashwant Shekhawat, Risho Oberoi and Ishraq Shah
- Story by: Ishraq Shah
- Based on: true incidents
- Produced by: Surendra Rajiv; Zenaida Mastura
- Starring: Arunoday Singh; Kitu Gidwani; Raghubir Yadav; Yashpal Sharma; Angira Dhar; Deepak Singh
- Edited by: Meghna Ashchit
- Music by: Band of Bandagi
- Distributed by: Philind Motion Picture
- Running time: 105 minutes
- Country: India
- Language: Hindi

Ek Bura Aadmi is an unreleased Hindi thriller film directed by Ishraq Shah and produced by Surendra Rajiv and Zenaida Mastura. This is a work of fiction inspired by real-life stories of well-known criminals turned politicians from the North Indian states of UP and Bihar. The film is a realistic portrayal of power politics where money and muscle play very prominent roles. The film was to be released on 26 July 2013. The film features Arunoday Singh, Kitu Gidwani, Raghuveer Yadav and Yashpal Sharma as main characters.

== Cast ==
- Arunoday Singh as Munna Siddiqui
- Kitu Gidwani as Rukmi Devi
- Raghubir Yadav as Prabhunath Pandey
- Yashpal Sharma as Rajnath Chowdhary
- Deepak Singh as Sajid Siddiqi
- Angira Dhar
- Vishal O Sharma as Captain Ganesh
- Vinod Nahardih

== Plot ==
The film revolves around the power politics of the Hindi heartland of UP and Bihar.

== Soundtrack ==
The music as well as the background score has been composed by Tochi Raina and his Band of Bandagi. Lyrics have been penned by Nasir Faraaz, Arafat Mehmood & Ishraq. The film features six songs:

1. Suraj Sehra Mein Akela Hai (Romantic Fusion) – Nasir faraaz
2. Yeh Tamasha Kya Hai (Sufi / Jazz / Rock Fusion) – Sufi
3. Uchal Gayi Chamiya (Item Number / Nautanki) – Mehmood Arafat
4. Gaon Ki Radha Ka Rukh (Folk - Holi) – Ishraq
5. Uth Ja Tham Le Tiranga (Patriotic / Call to Action) – Ishraq

The audio was released by Times Music (Junglee) in Delhi on 14 June and has been made available on all the digital platforms .
