= Angira Dhar =

Indian actress

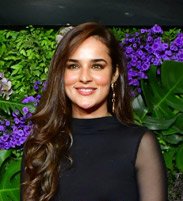
- Dhar in 2025
- Born: Bombay, Maharashtra, India
- Occupation: Actress
- Years active: 2013–present
- Spouse: Anand Tiwari (m. 2021)

Angira Satish Dhar is an Indian actress who appears in Hindi films and television. Her most notable work includes her roles in the films Love per Square Foot (2018), Commando 3 (2019) and Runway 34 (2022) and in the web series Bang Baaja Baaraat (2015) and Saas, Bahu Aur Flamingo (2023).

== Early and personal life ==
Dhar is a Kashmiri Hindu and was born and brought up in Bombay (now Mumbai) and is from its Mulund suburb. Her maternal grandfather was a documentary filmmaker and cinematographer based in Mumbai while her father's family migrated to the city from Srinagar following the exodus of Kashmiri Hindus in the 1990s.

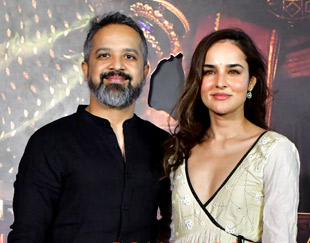
Dhar with her husband Anand Tiwari in 2025

Dhar married Love per Square Foot director, Anand Tiwari, in a secret ceremony on 30 April 2021.

== Career ==
=== Debut and early work (2013-2020) ===
Dhar began her career in TV production with Channel V. She also worked behind the camera as an assistant film director. She also hosted the show Beg Borrow Steal on Bindass. Dhar made her Bollywood debut in 2013 with Ek Bura Aadmi opposite Arunoday Singh.

Dhar had her breakthrough in 2015, when she played a feisty and independent girl in Y-Films's web series, Bang Baaja Baarat opposite Ali Fazal. Firstpost noted, "The gorgeous Angira Dhar really step up to the plate and deliver." The second season of the show started in September 2016.

Dhar played a bank employee in the 2018 film Love per Square Foot opposite Vicky Kaushal. It was the first Bollywood film to release directly on a streaming platform. Hindustan Times termed her "terrific". News18 stated, "The oven-baked pairing of Vicky and Angira is a delight as both deliver an earnest and honest performance throughout."

In 2019, she played a British Intelligence agent in Commando 3 alongside Vidyut Jamwal. Bollywood Hungama wrote, "Angira Dhar is great as the no-nonsense cop and underplays her part."

=== Further career and recent work (2021–present) ===
Dhar played a lawyer in Ajay Devgn's Runway 34 in 2022. Bollywood Hungama said, "Angira Dhar doesn't get much scope." Hindustan Times noted, "Angira Dhar has a smaller part and she does her parts well in handful of scenes."

Dhar played a quick-tempered women into the drugs business in her second web series, Saas, Bahu Aur Flamingo opposite Varun Mitra. Rediff.com stated, "Angira Dhar's flair for sly, snappish parts holds her in good stead."

== Filmography ==
Key
†	Denotes films that have not yet been released

=== Films ===
Year	Title	Role	Notes	Ref.
2013	Ek Bura Aadmi	Unknown		
2018	Love per Square Foot	Kareena D'Souza		
2019	Commando 3	Mallika Sood		
2022	Runway 34	Radhika Roy		
2025	Jombieland	Aanchal Hooda	Punjabi film	

=== Web series ===
Year	Title	Role	Notes	Ref.
2015	Bang Baaja Baaraat	Shahana Arora		
2026	Maa Ka Sum	Ira		

=== Television ===
Year	Title	Role	Notes	Ref.
2013	Beg Borrow Steal	Host		
2023	Saas, Bahu Aur Flamingo	Kajal		

=== Music video appearances ===
Year	Title	Singer	Ref.
2023	"Bairiya"	Arijit Singh	

== Awards and nominations ==
Year	Award	Category	Work	Result	Ref.
2020	Zee Cine Awards	Best Female Debut	Commando 3	Nominated	
