= Zarina Screwvala =

Indian entrepreneur and philanthropist

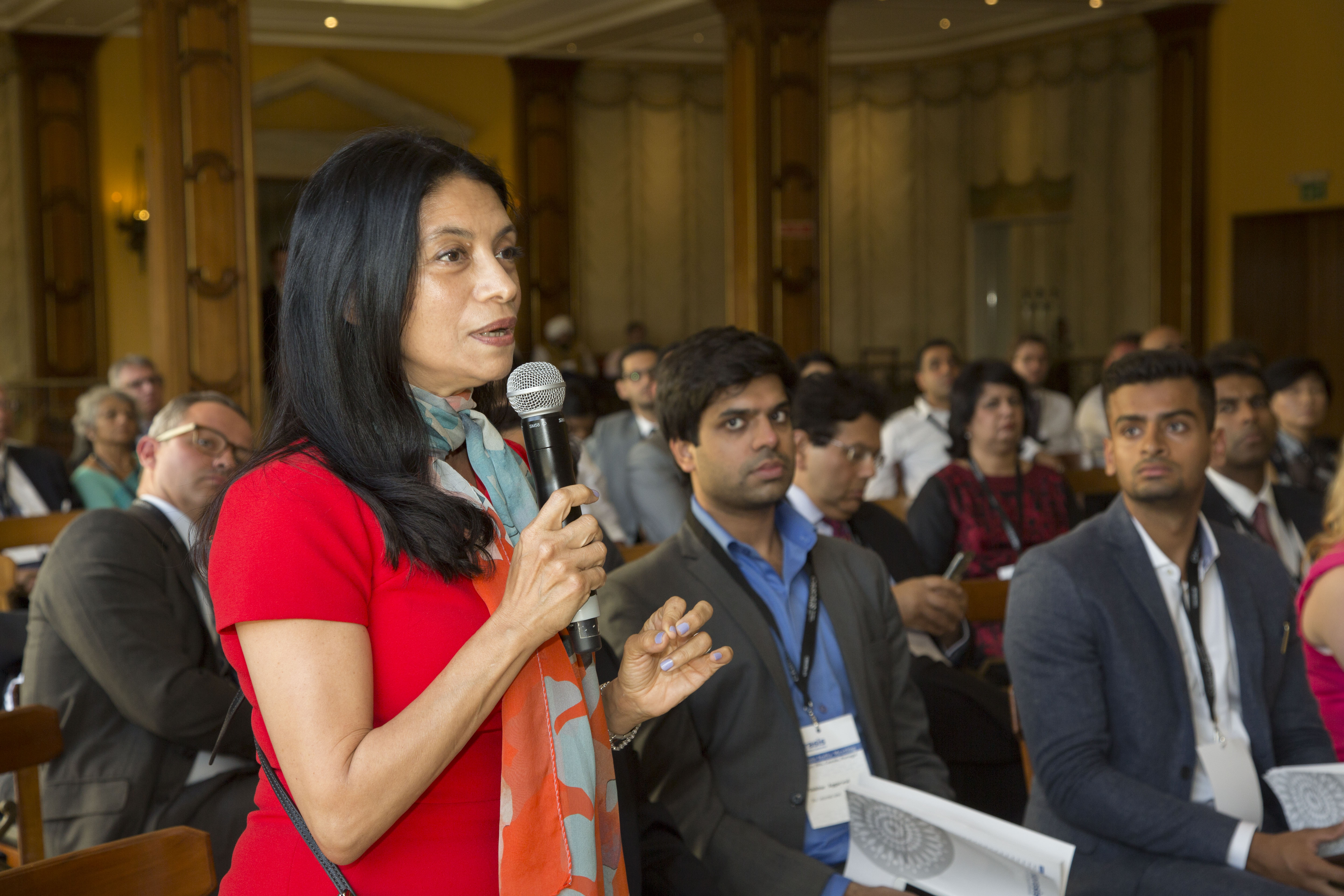
- Screwvala in July 2016
- Born: Zarina Mehta; 1961 (age 64–65); Washington, D.C., U.S.
- Education: St. Xavier's College, Mumbai
- Occupations: Entrepreneur; Philianthropist
- Organization(s): Swades Foundation; UTV Group (now Walt Disney India); Hungama TV; UTV Bindass
- Spouse: Ronnie Screwvala
- Relatives: Suhail Chandhok (son-in-law)

Zarina Screwvala (née Mehta, born 1961) is an Indian entrepreneur and philanthropist. She is currently the Managing Trustee of Swades Foundation, a foundation dedicated towards Rural Empowerment in India.

Previously, she was the Chief Creative Officer at UTV Software Communications (which she co- founded) where she conceptualised, promoted and managed the UTV Bindass, UTV Stars, UTV Action and Hungama TV channels.

== Early life ==
Mehta is from a Parsi family, her father Brigadier Furdoon Siavax Byramji "Duck" Mehta (1920–2021) was an officer in the Indian Army - the first Indian aviator of the Army Aviation Corps and the first Indian commanding officer of the 9 Parachute Field Regiment, her mother Villie Mehta (died 2020) ran a catering business serving Parsi cuisine.

Zarina Mehta was born in Washington, D.C., in the United States and moved to India with her family at the age of eight. She finished her schooling from J.B. Petit School for Girls and went on to pursue her B.A. in economics from St. Xavier's College, Mumbai.

She also holds a master's degree in Marketing and Advertising from Xavier's Institute of Communications.

== Early career ==
Screwvala started her career as a production manager for a play produced by reputed theatre artist Pearl Padamsee. It was during her stint with Pearl that she met Ronnie Screwvala and Deven Khote who later on became her business partners.

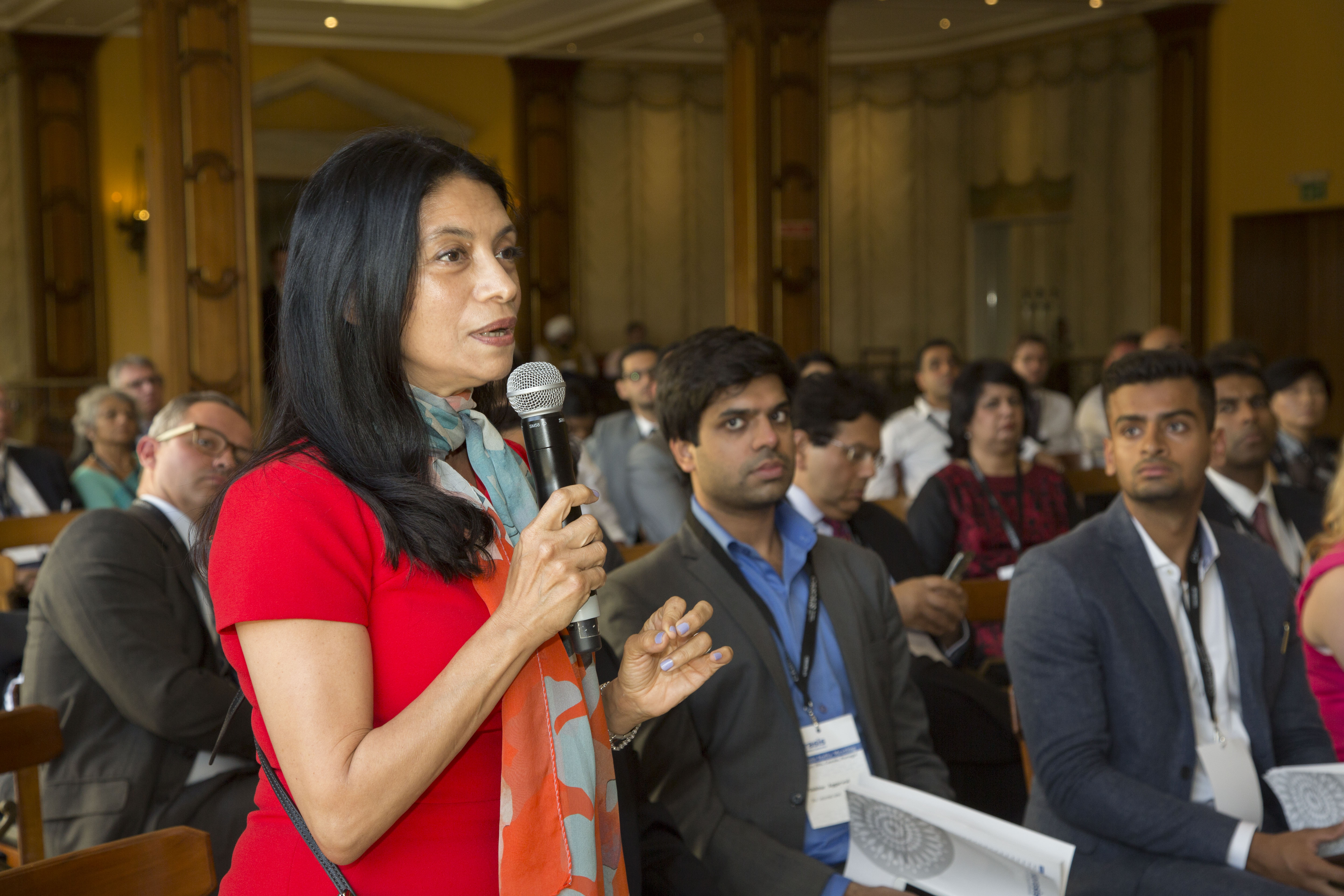
Screwvala at the Horasis India Meeting in 2016

== Career ==
=== United Television (UTV) ===
Screwvala co- founded UTV along with Ronnie Screwvala and Deven Khote in 1990. During the initial days, the company made advertisements and corporate films. In 1990, UTV became the first independent production. house. UTV produced a quiz show for state TV channel Doordarshan. The show was titled 'Mashoor Mahal' and Screwvala was the assistant director of the show. Screwvala also created and directed The Mathemagic Show and produced various other shows like Lifeline (a short film), Contact and Shakuntala

=== Content creator, UTV ===
UTV has been credited with the production of content for India's top entertainment channels like Zee TV, STAR TV and Sony. Zarina and Ronnie Screwvala and Deven Khote gave the country its first-ever reality show – Saanp Seedi (1992) and first daily soap opera Shanti (1994). After the success of Shanti, Screwvala went on to produce various shows, each targeting a different segment of audience. The shows produced by Screwvala were Saaya (targeted at young adults), Snakes & Ladders, Hip Hip Hurray (targeted at teens) and Shaka Laka Boom Boom (targeted at kids).

=== 2005, Hungama TV ===
In 2004, UTV launched Hungama TV, an exclusive channel for kids. She became an integral part of Hungama TV by starting as its 'Head of Programming' and later went on to become the COO.

She launched two very successful shows called Hero - Bhakti Hi Shakti Hai and Sanya and promoted international hits like Doraemon and Shin Chan.

In 2005–2006, she ideated and executed a campaign called Hungama TV Captain's Hunt wherein the channel launched a nationwide search for a "board of directors" composed of kids whose job was to suggest what was right or wrong with content on Hungama TV.

In 2006, Screwvala roped in Bollywood actor John Abraham as the channel's brand ambassador and launched the 'John Aur Kaun' campaign. The initiative aimed to give two kids the opportunity to star in the UTV produced John Abraham film, Dhan Dhana Dhan Goal.

As a result of these marketing efforts, Hungama TV became the No. 1 Kids channel in India in and remained the leader until. In 2006, UTV sold Hungama TV to the Walt Disney Company for $30.5 million.

=== UTV Bindaas ===
In 2007, Screwvala conceptualised and launched UTV Bindaas – a 360-degree Young India entertainment channel that encompassed a channel, on-ground events, mobile entertainment, gaming and merchandising. The brand values of Bindaas were defined as Fun, Frank, Fearless and Freedom and the 360-degree brand targeted Indians in the age group of 15 – 34.

The USP of the channel was its unique programming – stand-up shows, Hollywood blockbusters and thrillers – that was tailored specifically for the target group. The investment into launching all verticals of Bindaas crossed the Rs. 2.7 billion mark.

In 2010, the brand launched a 'What I Am' campaign which aimed to be the voice of young India. In the same year, UTV Bindass was rated the number one youth channel in India. Mehta also spearheaded the overhaul of the UTV branding and created its new identity with her team.

=== Buy-Out ===
In 2011, the Walt Disney Company announced plans to buy-out UTV for $454 million. The deal was finalised in February 2012. In July 2012, after 27 years in the industry, Screwvala quit Disney-UTV.

== Philanthropy ==
=== Swades Foundation ===
Zarina and Ronnie Screwvala set up UTV's Corporate Social Responsibility wing called Society to Heal, Aid, Restore, Educate (SHARE) with a vision to empower 1 million lives in the next 5 years across villages in the state of Maharashtra.

In 2012, SHARE was re-christened and launched as Swades. Swades is dedicated towards the cause of Rural Empowerment and works in the Raigad and Ratnagiri districts of Maharashtra. Currently, Screwvala is the Managing Trustee of Swades and overlooks all the aspects of the Foundation's functioning.

== Personal life ==
Screwvala lives in Breach Candy, Mumbai with her husband Ronnie Screwvala. Her passions are her Labrador Sprite and reading. She studies philosophy at New Acropolis India and is on the board of the Asia Society.
