= Anand Tiwari =

Indian actor and filmmaker (born 1983)

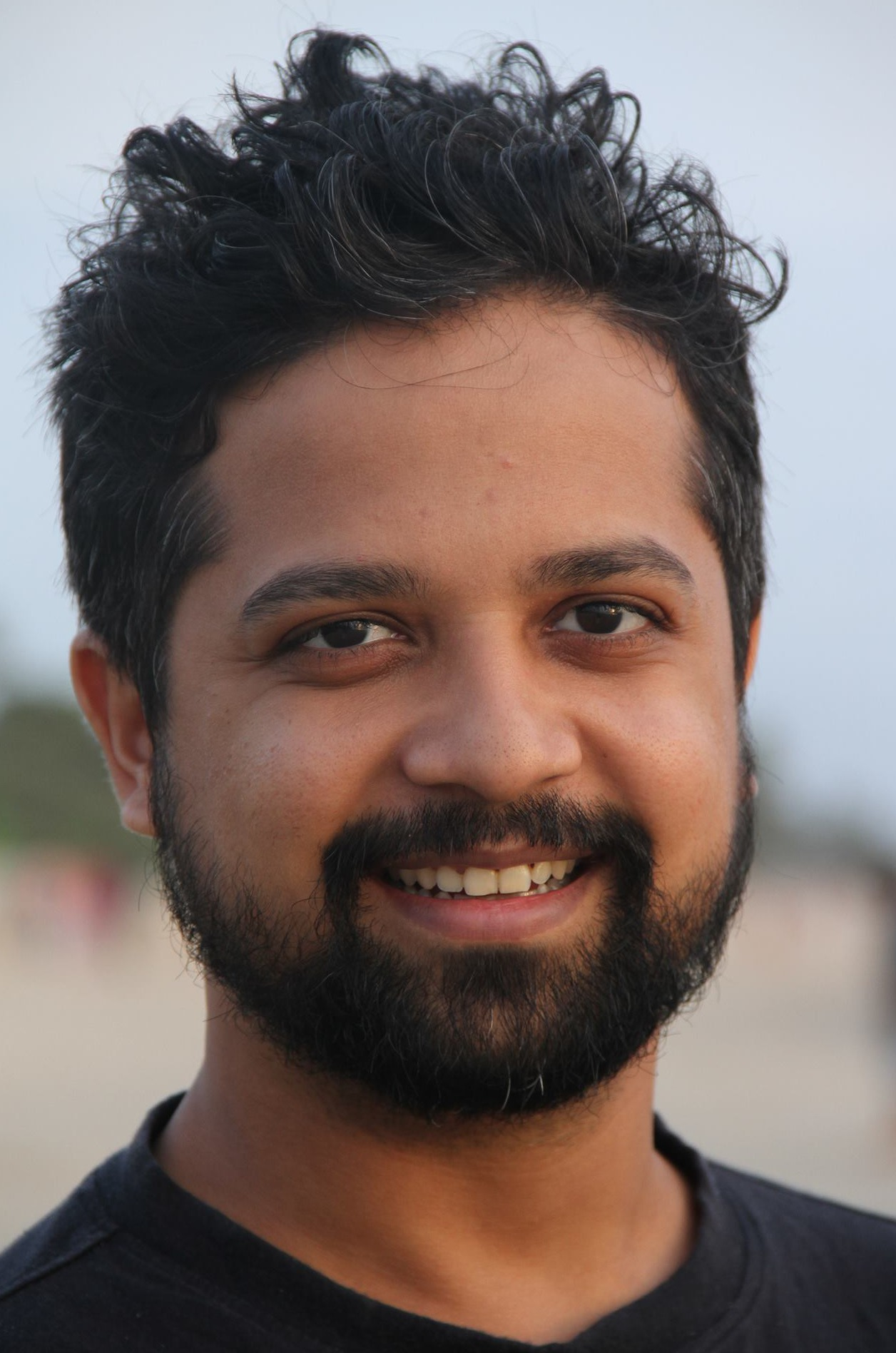
- Tiwari in 2022
- Born: 29 May 1983 (age 43); Bombay, Maharashtra, India
- Occupations: Actor; director
- Years active: 2008–present
- Spouse: Angira Dhar (m. 2021)

Anand Tiwari (born 29 May 1983) is an Indian actor, producer, writer, lyricist and director known for his work in Hindi films. He has appeared in films like Kites (2010), Udaan (2010), Aisha (2010), and Go Goa Gone (2013). As a stage actor, he is best known for Rage Productions' One on One (2010).

Tiwari is the co-founder of the production company Still and Still Media Collective under which he has produced his feature-length directorial debut Love per Square Foot (2018) and his hit series Bandish Bandits. For the latter, he was nominated for a Filmfare OTT Awards for Best Original Story.

== Early and personal life ==
Tiwari grew up in a family of doctors, in Matunga, Mumbai. He started acting in small roles in Marathi theatre in the local Ganpati and Navratri festivals. He frequented Shivaji Mandir in Dadar to watch plays, and also started attending summer acting workshops at his school. Subsequently, he completed his bachelor's in mass media, with a major in advertising, from the University of Mumbai in 2004.

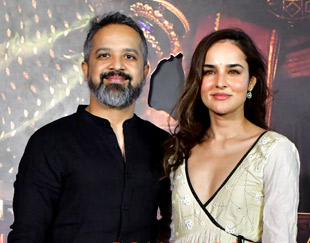
Tiwari with his wife Angira Dhar in 2025

Tiwari married actress Angira Dhar in an intimate wedding ceremony on 30 April 2021.

== Career ==
=== Acting career ===
Tiwari started his career in 2008 by acting in television commercials for brands like Citibank, Jet Airways, Tanishq, Tata ACE and DISH TV. He then transitioned into theatre in Mumbai, working in plays like Dreams of Taleem directed by Sunil Shanbag and Rage Theatre's One On One (2010).

Tiwari made his acting debut in Bollywood by playing small roles in several films including Slumdog Millionaire (2008), The President Is Coming (2009), Udaan (2010) and Kites (2010). He then appeared in supporting roles in the ensemble romantic comedy-drama Aisha (2010) directed by Rajshree Ojha and Go Goa Gone (2013), a zombie action comedy film directed by Raj and D.K. He has also appeared in the Hollywood film Fair Game (2010), which starred Naomi Watts and was an official entry at the Cannes Film Festival.

=== Directing career ===
Tiwari worked as assistant director for Anurag Basu's film Barfi! (2012) He has also worked as assistant co-ordinator and director with Cogito TV and Cyclops Films and Video.

Tiwari made his directorial debut with the 2018 film Love Per Square Foot. Produced by Ronnie Screwvala, under his newly established banner RSVP Movies; the film stars Vicky Kaushal and Angira Dhar in the lead roles. Tiwari who wrote the script in 2010, along with Sumeet Vyas, was originally set to make into a dark film but later decided to turn it into a romantic comedy. Originally scheduled for a theatrical release, Anand Tiwari eventually sent the film's final cut to the executives of Netflix India, who approved to release the film online. Thus it became the first Indian film to be released directly on a streaming platform. The film was screened at the Beijing International Film Festival, held in China in April 2019.

In 2020, Tiwari created, produced and directed the web series Bandish Bandits along with Amritpal Singh Bindra. The series feature debutants Ritwik Bhowmik as Radhe Rathod, a Hindustani Classical musician and Shreya Chaudhary as Tamanna Sharma, a pop singer, who hail from different worlds of music. Exploring the debate of music being a discipline versus a means of liberation. Bandish Bandits released on 4 August 2020, through Amazon Prime Video. It received positive response from critics and audiences, praising the performances of the cast, writing and direction, songs and background score. It was listed by critics as one of the best Indian television shows of 2020. The series was nominated for seven Filmfare OTT Awards including Best Original Story for Tiwari.

Tiwari is also filming for his second collaboration with Kaushal on Bad Newz featuring Tripti Dimri which he will also produce.

== Filmography ==
=== As actor ===
Year	Film	Role	Notes
2008	R(evolution)	Feroz	
2008	Mumbai Meri Jaan	Drug Addict Boy	
2008	Slumdog Millionaire	Newsreader	
2009	The President Is Coming	Kapil Dev Dholakia	
2010	Udaan	Mishter Apu	
2010	Fair Game	Hafiz	
2010	Kites	Robin	
2010	Aisha	Saurabh Lamba	
2010	The Film Emotional Atyachar	Hiten Sardesai	
2011	Jo Dooba So Paar: It's Love in Bihar!	Kishu	
2012	Go Goa Gone	Bunny	
2013	What the Fish	Neerav	
2014	Dishkiyaoon	Rocky	
2014	Finding Fanny	Father Francis	English film
2014	Charlie Kay Chakkar Mein	Dips	
2015	Detective Byomkesh Bakshy!	Ajit Banerjee	
2020	Chhapaak	Bajaj Husband	
2021	Nail Polish	Amit Kumar	ZEE5 Originals film
2024	Ae Watan Mere Watan	Firdaus Engineer	Amazon Prime Video film

=== As director ===
Year	Film	Notes
2012	Neighbours	Short film
2013	Haircut	Short film
2018	Love per Square Foot	Netflix film
2022	Maja Ma	Amazon Prime Video film
2024	Bad Newz	

=== Television ===
Year	Film	Actor	Director	Producer	Writer	Notes
2015	Bang Baaja Baarat	Doctor	Yes	No	Yes	Web series
2015	Sumit Sambhal Lega	Namit	No	No	No	Sitcom
2016	Sex Chat with Pappu & Papa	Papa	No	Yes	No	Web series
2018	Gabru: Hip Hop Ke Shehzaade	No	No	Yes	No	
2020	Bandish Bandits	No	Yes	Yes	Yes	
