= Aisha (2010 film) =

2010 Indian romantic comedy-drama film

- Indian poster
- Directed by: Rajshree Ojha
- Written by: Devika Bhagat (dialogue); Ritu Bhatia (dialogue); Manu Rishi (dialogue)
- Screenplay by: Devika Bhagat
- Based on: Emma by Jane Austen; Clueless
- Produced by: Sunil Manchanda; Rhea Kapoor; Anil Kapoor
- Starring: Sonam Kapoor; Abhay Deol; Ira Dubey; Cyrus Sahukar; Amrita Puri; Anand Tiwari; Arunoday Singh; Lisa Haydon
- Cinematography: Diego Rodriguez
- Edited by: A. Sreekar Prasad
- Music by: Amit Trivedi
- Production company: Anil Kapoor Films Company
- Distributed by: PVR Pictures
- Release date: 6 August 2010
- Running time: 126 minutes
- Country: India
- Language: Hindi
- Budget: ₹12 crore (US$1.2 million)
- Box office: ₹28.65 crore (US$3.0 million)

Aisha is a 2010 Indian Hindi-language romantic comedy-drama directed by Rajshree Ojha. It features an ensemble cast of Sonam Kapoor, Abhay Deol, Ira Dubey, Cyrus Sahukar, Amrita Puri, Anand Tiwari, Arunoday Singh and Lisa Haydon. It is set in the upper-class society of Delhi, India and is an adaptation of Jane Austen's 1815 novel Emma with the same tone as the American film Clueless which is also an adaptation of Austen's novel. The soundtrack of the film, which was composed by Amit Trivedi with lyrics penned by Javed Akhtar, received highly positive reviews from music critics.

Aisha was released on 6 August 2010 and proved to be a moderate commercial success at the box office.

At the 56th Filmfare Awards, Aisha received 2 nominations – Best Supporting Actress and Best Female Debut (both for Puri).

== Plot ==
Aisha Kapoor is a young, rich, upper-class girl who believes that she is perfectly suited for matchmaking, amongst her friends in particular. Her superficial lifestyle and match-making schemes are constantly criticized by her brother-in-law to her elder sister, Aalia, and frenemy/ neighbour, Arjun Burman, who advises her to stop meddling with the lives of other people. Soon, she has a new project: trying to make a match between her middle-class, small-town friend Shefali Thakur and a sweetmeat business tycoon and friend, Randhir Gambhir, much to the chagrin of her best friend Pinky Bose. Aisha creates various circumstances to make Shefali and Randhir fall in love. During one such occasion, she meets her aunt's stepson, Dhruv Singh, whom she becomes attracted to. In the meantime, Arjun introduces Aisha to one of his colleagues, Aarti Menon, who is from New York City. Aisha feels threatened by Aarti's presence and is very antagonistic towards her.

Randhir organizes a river-rafting camp for everyone, and Aisha uses this as a chance to get Randhir and Shefali to spend more time together. Meanwhile, Shefali gets proposed to by her childhood friend, Saurabh Lamba, and she asks Aisha for advice, but Aisha passive-aggressively tells her to reject Saurabh and get with Randhir instead. However, one night during the camp, Randhir takes Aisha for a walk and then confesses his love for her. Confused and taken aback by Randhir's feelings for her, Aisha starts to doubt her match-making skills. Arjun learns of this and Aisha's dismissal of Saurabh at Shefali's behest and gets angry at Aisha, criticizing her for once again meddling with the lives of others and playing with Shefali's feelings. Aisha tries to console heartbroken Shefali. As time passes, Pinky starts to develop feelings for Randhir, and eventually they are engaged. This causes a disagreement between Pinky and Aisha, and they stop speaking to each other.

Disheartened with her previous failed match-making attempt, Aisha tries to match up Shefali with Dhruv. Shefali discovers Aisha's plan and confronts her, telling Aisha that she never viewed her as a friend, but rather as a project, someone whom she tried to mold and fix. Shefali then declares that she has feelings for Arjun. This greatly confuses and hurts Aisha, since she realises that she has been in love with Arjun all this time. Aisha realises that she has been selfish and arrogant all along, playing with the emotions and feelings of her friends. She goes back to her best friend, Pinky, and apologizes for her actions. Dhruv and Aarti get engaged, but Aisha chooses not to attend since she thinks that Arjun will be there with Shefali. After a late-night conversation with her father, Aisha decides spontaneously to go to the engagement and declare her feelings to Arjun. She meets Shefali, who tells her that love cannot be forced or planned, and also reveals that she has found her love in Saurabh, whose proposal she had previously turned down.

Later that night, Arjun and Aisha meet and reminisce about their childhood and friendship, and ultimately declare their love for each other and kiss. The movie ends one year later, at Dhruv and Aarti's wedding, where Aisha states that love is spontaneous and never goes according to plan.

== Cast ==
- Sonam Kapoor as Aisha Kapoor, based on Emma Woodhouse
- Abhay Deol as Arjun Burman, based on George Knightley
- Anand Tiwari as Saurabh Lamba, based on Robert Martin
- Ira Dubey as Pinky Bose, inspired by Miss Taylor (as the protagonist's friend)
- Cyrus Sahukar as Randhir Gambhir, based on Philip Elton
- Amrita Puri as Shefali Thakur, based on Harriet Smith
- Arunoday Singh as Dhruv Singh, based on Frank Churchill
- Lisa Haydon as Aarti Menon, based on Jane Fairfax
- M. K. Raina as Mr. Kapoor, Aisha and Aalia's father, based on Henry Woodhouse
- Anuradha Patel as Chitra Kanwar Singh, Aisha's aunt, inspired by Miss Taylor
- Yuri Suri as Col. Raghuvendra Singh, based on Mr. Weston
- Sameer Malhotra as Karan Burman, Aalia's husband, based on John Knightley
- Vidushi Mehra as Aalia Burman (née Kapoor), Aisha's sister, based on Isabella Woodhouse-Knightley
- Masood Akhtar as Sant Ram

== Soundtrack ==
Aisha

Soundtrack album by Amit Trivedi
- Released: 8 July 2010
- Genre: Film soundtrack
- Label: Sony Music

Amit Trivedi chronology
Udaan (2010)	Aisha (2010)	No One Killed Jessica (2011)

The music of Aisha was composed by Amit Trivedi, with lyrics penned by Javed Akhtar.

=== Track list ===
No.	Title	Artist	Length
1.	"Suno Aisha"	Ash King, Nakash Aziz, Amit Trivedi (Additional Vocals: Addit)	4:19
2.	"Gal Mitthi Mitthi"	Tochi Raina	4:15
3.	"Shaam"	Nikhil D'Souza, Amit Trivedi, Neuman Pinto	4:44
4.	"Behke Behke"	Anushka Manchanda, Samrat Kaushal, Raman Mahadevan	3:43
5.	"Lehrein"	Anusha Mani, Neuman Pinto, Nikhil D'Souza	4:50
6.	"By The Way"	Anushka Manchanda, Neuman Pinto	3:31
7.	"Gal Mitthi" (Bombay Bounce Dhol Mix)	Tochi Raina	4:01
8.	"Lehrein" (Bombay Bounce Lounge Mix)	Anusha Mani, Nikhil D'Souza, Neuman Pinto	4:45

=== Music Review ===
Professional ratings
Review scores
Source	Rating
Bollywood Hungama	5/5 stars
IBN Live	4/5 stars
Rediff	4/5 stars
PlanetBollywood.com	8/10 stars
Music Aloud	8.75/10 stars
Glamsham	4/5 stars
Apunkachoice	3.5/5 stars
Planet Radio City	4/5 stars
Music Perk	7/10 stars

The film's soundtrack by Amit Trivedi received extraordinary appreciation from critics.

IBNLive said, "With the stupendous music of Dev.D, Amit Trivedi proved his prowess and now with the soundtrack of the forthcoming film Aisha, he has reaffirmed that he is a young composer to look out for. Amit Trivedi deserves to be applauded for the soundtrack of Aisha, which is contemporary yet different. The composer has tried to fuse new sounds in the music of the film, which has worked very well."

Atta Khan of PlanetBollywood.com said, "Put simply, the music of Aisha is super cool, vibrant and fun, has tons of variety and is an extremely colourful and inventive soundtrack that defines the new-age music we have come to associate with Amit Trivedi."

According to Glamsham, "AISHA is a sassy, stylish, cool album and has that desired "feel-good" musical feel to strike chords with pop-genre listeners. Amit Trivedi proves his mettle again and is high on his creative genius with strong inputs and influences of classical rock and youthful peppy-feel tracks. Chartbusting success and oodles of entertainment are there in soundtracks like "Suno Aisha", "Sham", "Lehrein" and "By The Way" and makes it sure that it will be positive add-ons to the narration of the flick."

Raja Sen of Rediff said, "What really does stand out in Trivedi's work is a defiant lack of attention to lyric. The best composers in the industry have either Oscar-winning poets writing their words or quirky ad-men crafting makeshift metaphors or even young bespectacled directors knowing what their songs should say: Trivedi seems to have none of this in Aisha, and yet gives us a very enjoyable, very young soundtrack with a distinct voice. His music – in fact, the feel of his music – does its own talking, and I recommend you listen to it a while."

Usha Lakra of Apun Ka Choice said, "Seeing Amit's history of producing unconventional Bollywood tracks, the Aisha compositions have us completely floored. The composer has got fire in the belly and he has proved his mettle yet again. Oh boy! Where were you?".

Harshita Kohli of Planet Radio City said this about the music, "Overall, Aisha is a young album. The music is catchy, peppy and makes you feel good by the time you hit stop. It is far removed from Amit's previous work and that shows the talent this young man has. Definitely an album worth having!"

Joginder Tuteja of Bollywood Hungama said, "Aisha springs a pleasant surprise. Of course one did expect a good score here but what one gets to hear is complete album that is new-age, different and yet so appealing to youth. There is not a single song which doesn't work and each one tries to better the other. Ever since the release of music of Dev.D, one wondered if composer Amit Trivedi would ever manage to come up with a wholesome album like that. He did compose for a few films in between and some of his work did impress. However, Aisha will clearly stand out as his best score since Dev.D. Go for it and play it on with friends!"

Vipin of Music Aloud said, "Just a week since Udaan hit the shelves, Amit Trivedi continues to amaze with his consistency as he churns out another unputdownable soundtrack for Aisha. Respect!"

Mukund Laddha of Music Perk said, "Amit Trivedi adds another feather in his hat with this album. The music album of Aisha has a jazzy song in its title track which is surely one of best songs of 2010 along with "Gal Mitthi Mitthi". None of the other songs create any interest though. The background music of this movie is praiseworthy. It is surely one album that you can to check out."

== Reception ==
=== Critical reception ===
Aisha received mixed-to-positive reviews from critics upon release.

Nikhat Kazmi of The Times of India awarded the movie 4/5, saying that "Sweet love, substantial performances, super fun, slick 'n stylish, Aisha is a-ha stuff." Indo-Asian News Service of NDTV gave the movie a positive review, stating that "Engaging and endearing – Aisha makes you wonder if there's anything more important in the world than finding the right match." Sonia Chopra of Sify awarded the movie 3.5/5, commenting that "It's so rare for a film to get it all together: from the story, to the performances, to the atmospherics, to the music and more. This one goes perfectly with the popcorn; don't miss it." Taran Adarsh of Oneindia awarded the movie 3.5/5, concluding that "Aisha holds appeal for the youth mainly and there's a strong likelihood that this segment of movie-going audience will fall for its charms." Kaveree Bamzai of India Today awarded the movie 3/5, commenting that "It's trashy, but it's beautifully trashy. Almost like the food and conversation at a long Delhi brunch." Sukanya Verma of Rediff awarded the movie 3/5, saying that "Beautifully shot and packaged with a fabulous soundtrack and superlative ensemble cast, Aisha, quite often, gets caught up in a self-created tangle of brand-led vanity to ever let one get acquainted to its leading lady."

Aniruddha Guha of DNA India awarded the movie 2.5/5, stating that "Aisha leaves you with mixed feelings. It, however, might be the ideal date-flick." Shubhra Gupta of The Indian Express awarded the movie 2/5, concluding that "This is a good-looking movie, with not a hair out of place, but we wish it was a little more rumpled, a little more lived in. Aisha is strictly in-between shallow." Rajeev Masand of CNN-IBN awarded the movie 2/5, saying that "Aisha is like a pretty flute of champagne, but it loses its fizz far too quickly." Komal Nahta of DNA India awarded the movie 2/5, stating that "Aisha was never meant for the single-screen and small-town audiences, but it doesn't cut ice with the multiplex and city audience either."

=== Box-Office ===
==== India ====
Aisha had an average opening at the box office, with collections of around 30–35%. and collected ₹29.1 million (US$300,000) net in its first day. It collected ₹103 million (US$1.1 million) in its first weekend. It went on to collect ₹128 million (US$1.3 million) net in its first week and ₹24.8 million (US$260,000) in its second week. It grossed ₹215 million (US$2.2 million) in its lifetime run. Aisha was declared a semi-hit, collecting ₹161 million (US$1.7 million) nett in its entire run.

==== Overseas ====
Aisha collected $350,000 in its first weekend at the overseas box office and was declared a semi-hit, collecting around $1,000,000 in its entire run.
