= Arunoday Singh =

Indian actor (born 1983)

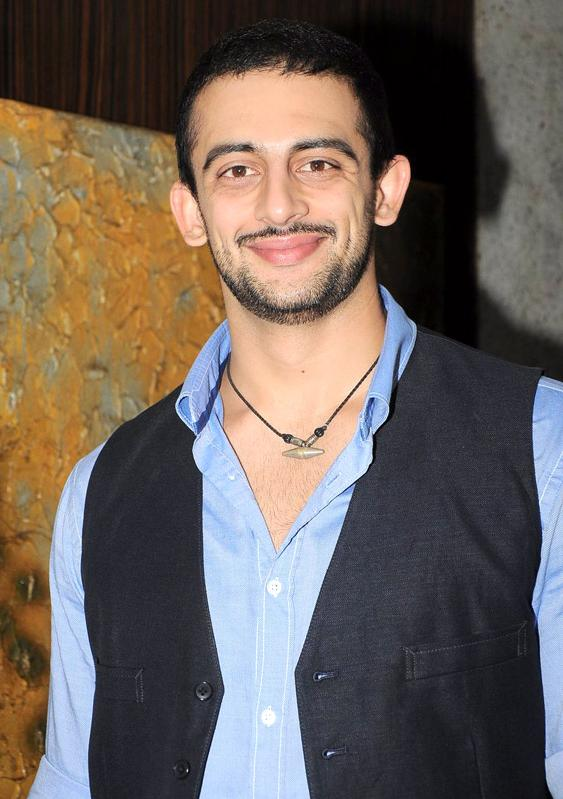
- Arunoday in 2012
- Born: 17 February 1983 (age 43); Churhat, Madhya Pradesh, India
- Occupations: Actor; poet
- Years active: 2009–present
- Spouse: LeeAnna Elton (m. 2016; div. 2019)
- Father: Ajay Arjun Singh
- Relatives: Arjun Singh (grandfather)

Arunoday Singh is an Indian actor. He made his debut with Sikandar (2009). He has appeared in films like Aisha (2010), Yeh Saali Zindagi (2011), Jism 2 (2012), Main Tera Hero (2014), Mr X (2015), Mohenjo Daro (2016) and Blackmail (2018). He also appeared in the web series Apaharan (2018–2022).

== Early life and background ==
Singh is the grandson of Arjun Singh, an Indian politician who was the Chief Minister of Madhya Pradesh and Human Resource Minister in Govt of India, and son of Ajay Singh (Rahul bhaiya) leader of opposition in Madhya Pradesh State assembly.

He is an alumnus of Brandeis University, having previously been educated at a boarding school in Kodaikanal, where he performed in school plays. According to him, it was after watching actor Marlon Brando in On the Waterfront (1954) that he decided to become an actor. After his graduation, he did a few courses in the New York Film Academy, and thereafter enrolled in the Acting Studio in New York, during the period he also performed in plays.

== Career ==
After finishing his studies he started giving auditions, and finally made his debut with Sikandar (2009), directed by Piyush Jha, playing a Kashmiri terrorist. His second film was the ensemble romantic comedy-drama Aisha (2010), an adaptation of the novel Emma by Jane Austen directed by Rajshree Ojha, co-starring Sonam Kapoor, Abhay Deol, Ira Dubey, Cyrus Sahukar, Amrita Puri, Anand Tiwari and Lisa Haydon; he portrayed Dhruv Singh, a flirtatious playboy. Also in the same year, he appeared in Vinay Shukla's take on gender and sexuality in Mirch, through a collage of five stories, with Konkana Sen Sharma, Raima Sen, where he played the central character of a struggling film director.

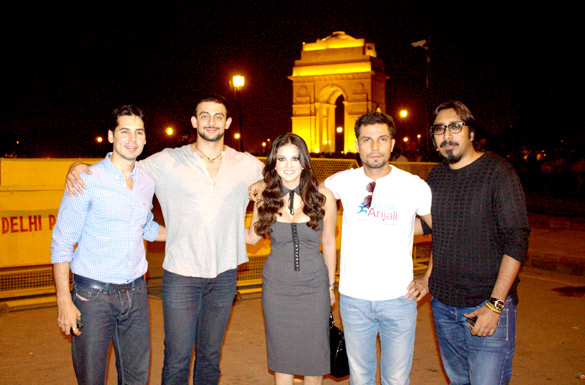
Dino Morea, Arunoday Singh, Sunny Leone, Randeep Hooda and Arko Pravo Mukherjee during Jism 2 promotions

In 2011, he acted alongside Irrfan Khan and Aditi Rao Hydari, another newcomer in Sudhir Mishra's Yeh Saali Zindagi (2011). His performance earned him a nomination for Best Actor in a Supporting Role at the 18th Screen Awards. He next appeared in Jism 2 opposite Sunny Leone and Randeep Hooda. In 2014 he appeared in David Dhawan's comedy film Main Tera Hero opposite Varun Dhawan, Ileana D'Cruz and Nargis Fakhri; and the supernatural thriller film Pizza. His next release was Mr. X as Dr. Steve Rhodes opposite Emraan Hashmi and Amyra Dastur. In 2016, Singh appeared in Ashutosh Gowariker's epic-adventure romance film Mohenjo Daro, alongside Hrithik Roshan and Pooja Hegde.

== Personal life ==
Singh has identified with Sufism, saying that "no other religion speaks to me like Sufism does."

Singh is a visual artist as well a poet, a collection of his English poetry was published in book form in 2023, Unsung, by Penguin Random House India.

On 13 December 2016, he married LeeAnn Elton, whom he met three years previously in Goa. Lee owns a cafe in Goa. They divorced in 2019.

== Filmography ==
Key
†	Denotes films that have not yet been released

Year	Title	Role	Notes
2009	Sikandar	Zahageer Qadir	
2010	Aisha	Dhruv Singh	
2010	Mirch	Maanav	
2011	Yeh Saali Zindagi	Kuldeep	Nominated – Best Actor in a Supporting Role Screen Awards
2012	Jism 2	Ayaan Thakur	
2013	Ek Bura Aadmi	Munna Siddiqui	
2014	Main Tera Hero	Angad Negi	
2014	Pizza	Mr. Ghost	
2014	Ungli	Rajveer Singh "Ricky"	
2015	Mr. X	ACP Aditya Bharadwaj	
2016	Buddha in a Traffic Jam	Vikram Pandit	Bilingual film
2016	Mohenjo Daro	Moonja	
2017	Viceroy's House	Asif (Huma's Fiancée)	English Film
2017	1971: Beyond Borders	Lt. Col. Akram Raja	Malayalam Film
2018	Love per Square Foot	Kashin Malhotra	
2018	Blackmail	Ranjit Arora	
2026	Maa Behen	Maheshwari	

=== Web series ===
Year	Title	Role	Platform	Notes
2018–present	Apharan - Sabka Katega	Rudra Shrivastava / Bikram Bahadur Shah (BBS)	ALTBalaji	
2019	The Chargesheet: Innocent or Guilty?	Ranveer Pratap Singh	ZEE5	
2020	Lahore Confidential	Rauf Ahmed Kazmi/Wasim Ahmed Khan	ZEE5	
2022–present	Yeh Kaali Kaali Ankhein	Contract Killer Aditya Hafeez	Netflix	
2025	Kanneda	Sarabjit	JioHotstar	
