= Udaan (2010 film) =

2010 Indian film by Vikramaditya Motwane

- Theatrical release poster
- Directed by: Vikramaditya Motwane
- Written by: Vikramaditya Motwane; Anurag Kashyap
- Produced by: Anurag Kashyap; Sanjay Singh; Ronnie Screwvala
- Starring: Rajat Barmecha; Ronit Roy; Aayan Boradia; Ram Kapoor
- Cinematography: Mahendra J. Shetty
- Edited by: Dipika Kalra
- Music by: Amit Trivedi
- Production companies: UTV Spotboy; Anurag Kashyap Films
- Release date: 16 July 2010
- Running time: 138 minutes
- Country: India
- Language: Hindi
- Budget: ₹5 crores
- Box office: ₹3.35 crores

Udaan (transl. Flight) is a 2010 Indian Hindi-language coming-of-age drama film directed by Vikramaditya Motwane in his directorial debut. It was produced by Sanjay Singh, Anurag Kashyap, and Ronnie Screwvala under their production companies Anurag Kashyap Films and UTV Spotboy, respectively. Written by Motwane and Kashyap, the film stars debutante Rajat Barmecha, Ronit Roy, Aayan Boradia, and Ram Kapoor. It follows the story of a teen who is forced to live with his oppressive father back home after he is expelled from boarding school.

Motwane wrote the script in 2003, but could not find a producer. He co-wrote Kashyap's Dev.D (2009), and Kashyap produced and co-wrote Udaan. The film was set and shot in the industrial town of Jamshedpur. Mahendra J. Shetty was its director of photography, and Dipika Kalra was the editor; Aditya Kanwar was the production designer.

Udaan premiered in the Un Certain Regard section of the 2010 Cannes Film Festival, and received a standing ovation; it was the first Indian film represented at Cannes in seven years. The film was also screened at the Giffoni Film Festival and the 2011 Indian Film Festival of Los Angeles. Although it was released on 16 July 2010 to critical acclaim and was a commercial failure at the box office (grossing ₹3.35 crores from a production budget of ₹5 crores). At the 56th Filmfare Awards, the film received seven awards: Best Screenplay and Best Story (Motwane and Kashyap), Best Cinematography (Mahendra Shetty), Best Background Music (Trivedi), Best Supporting Actor (Male) (Roy), Best Sound Design Award (Kunam Sharma) and the Best Film (Critics) Award. In 2019, Film Companion ranked Roy's performance second in their list of the 100 greatest performances of the decade.

== Plot ==
Seventeen-year-old Rohan is expelled from the Bishop Cotton boarding school in Shimla with three of his friends (Vikram, Benoy, and Maninder) after they are caught watching a pornographic film outside campus in the middle of the night. Rohan returns home to Jamshedpur, where his stern, abusive, alcoholic father, Bhairav Singh, and his six-year-old half-brother Arjun (whom Rohan hadn't known before) live. Bhairav forces him to run every morning (racing him the last leg), work at his metalworking factory and attend engineering classes at the local university. Bhairav expresses his disappointment in him by humiliating and abusing him, both verbally and physically. Rohan aspires to be a writer, and his uncle, Jimmy, supports his ambition.

Rohan deliberately fails his examinations so that Bhairav will give up on him, freeing him to pursue his dream of becoming a writer. Bhairav, summoned to school to pick Arjun up, loses an important contract. Rohan comes home to find Arjun being rushed to the hospital for an unknown reason; according to Bhairav, Arjun fell down the stairs. Fearful of making things worse, Rohan lies to Bhairav that he passed his exams. Bhairav goes to Kolkata on an urgent business trip, leaving Rohan to look after Arjun in the hospital. Rohan impresses the hospital employees, including doctors and nurses, with his stories and poems and discovers that Arjun was actually beaten by the angered Bhairav after he lost the contract.

Returning from Kolkata, Bhairav learns that Rohan failed his exams. Enraged, he beats Rohan during the night and apologizes the following day. Announcing that he's going to remarry again, Bhairav decides to send Arjun to boarding school and have Rohan quit college to work full-time at the factory. When Jimmy offers to take Arjun in, Bhairav belittles him and throws him out of the house as Rohan begs Jimmy to take him away. Bhairav burns the diary in which Rohan has written all his poems and later introduces his new wife and stepdaughter to him.

Rohan spends a night in jail after damaging Bhairav's car when Bhairav refuses to help him. He comes home to find his future stepmother and her relatives in the house and learns that Arjun is leaving for boarding school the following day. Wishing Arjun luck, Rohan prepares to leave home. He has a bitter confrontation with Bhairav in front of his guests before punching him and running away. Bhairav chases Rohan through the streets on foot but loses him. Rohan spends the night at Jimmy's house, and Jimmy speaks to him about Arjun. The next morning, Rohan returns home and finds Arjun waiting outside while Bhairav is gone to get an auto rickshaw to send him to the boarding school. Rohan convinces Arjun to go with him to Mumbai, where Rohan's friends from his school have asked him to move. Rohan leaves a watch (which Bhairav gave him on his 18th birthday) and a note warning that if he searches for them, he'll inform the police about his physically abusive nature and how he had abused both of them. Both brothers walk away and start their journey to Mumbai. Bhairav notices Arjun missing and picks up the note Rohan left him. With no choice, he decides to continue his part of life. Both brothers arrive at Mumbai.

== Cast ==
- Rajat Barmecha as Rohan Singh, a recently expelled college student.
- Ronit Roy as Bhairav Singh, the owner of a metal-working factory, Rohan's violent and abusive father.
- Aayan Boradia as Arjun Singh, Jimmy's other nephew, Bhairav's youngest son and Rohan's younger half-brother.
- Ram Kapoor as Jimmy Singh, Bhairav's younger brother and Rohan and Arjun's paternal uncle.
- Manjot Singh as Maninder Singh, a friend of Rohan's from the boarding school which they got expelled from
- Raja Hudda as Vikram, a friend of Rohan's from the boarding school which they got expelled from
- Varun Khettry as Benoy, a friend of Rohan's from the boarding school which they got expelled from
- Anand Tiwari as Appu, Rohan's senior friend
- Arvind Kumar as Mr. Rao, the Plant Manager of Bhairav's metal-working factory who teaches Rohan and becomes his boss when he works part-time over there.

== Production ==
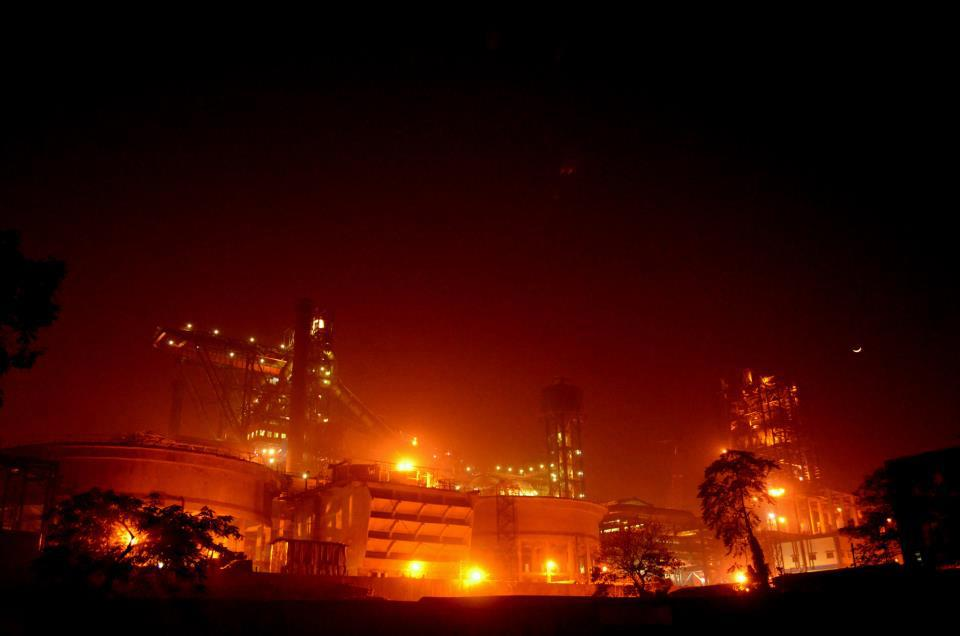
Udaan was set and filmed in Jamshedpur.

While working on Devdas as an assistant director in 2002, Vikramaditya Motwane saw Sweet Sixteen (directed by Ken Loach, about a troubled teenager who sets out to raise money for a new home). Motwane said that the film left "a deep imprint on my mind" and thought, "Why couldn’t a similar film about a youngster be made in India?" Drawing on his own life and surroundings, he wrote a screenplay revolving around a problematic father-son relationship. Motwane decided to set the film in the industrial city of Jamshedpur when he was struck by the contrast between the area surrounding the Tata Steel plant and Jamshedpur's sister city, Adityapur, saying that the former was an "amalgamation of diverse cultural influences." He wrote the script, described it to his friend Anurag Kashyap, and realised that "some of the scenes have resemblance to his real life" (like taking a car out at night and having fun with friends). Kashyap enjoyed the script and told Motwane,"If no one produces it, you come to me, [and] I will do so."

Motwane signed Kashyap as a dialogue writer in 2003, and paid him ₹10,000 (US$100). He could not find a producer for his film, since it had no commercially viable actor. Kashyap had worked with Motwane on his unreleased film, Paanch, in which Motwane was the song choreographer. Since he knew "how good [Motwane] was", he decided to produce Udaan. Motwane had completed the script in 2003, so it took him seven years to find a producer for the film; it was produced by Kashyap and Sanjay Singh under the former's production company, Anurag Kashyap Films. Later, Ronnie Screwvala of UTV Spotboy represented the film for global sales and distribution at the International film markets. Motwane said that many people "wanted to add and subtract things to increase the selling value of the film", with which he did not agree. Although Kashyap wanted to produce his film, his own films were unreleased.

Udaan is not autobiographical, but Motwane said that the script has traces of his life: "As a first-time writer there was a lot that I took from my own life, in terms of certain themes and references, with observations of friends." He initially made some changes to the script when he looked for financing and called its final version "a combination of first and second drafts." Kashyap told Motwane in 2003, after reading the script, that he would solely produce the film. Motwane was the co-writer for Kashyap's Dev.D (2009) before Kashyap agreed to produce Udaan. He said that it is "one of the few films made on teenagers and their issues growing up", since teen films "usually tackle love stories". For a scene in the film involving Rohan's mother, Motwane used his wife's photograph. Motwane called it a "simple straightforward film" about a boy "who wants to break free from his clutches."

Newcomer Rajat Barmecha was cast as Rohan after several screen tests by casting director Jogi. Motwane did not like his initial auditions, but Barmecha later improved and was chosen. The film was set and shot extensively in Jamshedpur, with a local production crew. It was filmed for 39 days (out of a 42-day shooting schedule) in a HUDCO bungalow and the Circuit House area and also in Shimla for three days. The production crew included 13 students and ten actors from the city. The film was shot on super 16 mm film with sync sound. Mahendra J. Shetty was Udaan's director of photography, and Dipika Kalra was the film's editor; Aditya Kanwar was its production designer. The film featured Ronit Roy, Aayan Boradia, Ram Kapoor, Manjot Singh and Anand Tiwari in supporting roles.

== Soundtrack ==
The film's score was composed by Amit Trivedi, with lyrics by Amitabh Bhattacharya and Kashyap. The soundtrack album had seven songs, including one instrumental; Joi Barua, Neuman Pinto, Bhattacharya, Trivedi, Mohan Kannan, Raman Mahadevan, Bonnie Chakraborty, Kashyap, Kshitij Wagh, Tochi Raina, Shriram Iyer and Nikhil D'Souza provided vocals. It was released on 29 June 2010 on the T-Series label to positive responses from critics.

== Release ==
Udaan premiered in the Un Certain Regard section of the 2010 Cannes Film Festival as The Flight, and received a standing ovation. It was the first Indian film represented at Cannes in seven years, and it was also screened at the Giffoni Film Festival and the 2011 Indian Film Festival of Los Angeles. Kashyap released a letter he wrote to his parents in 1993 (when he left home and went to Mumbai), and he and Motwane destroyed a car—imitating a scene in the film—for a promotion.

Udaan was released on 16 July 2010 with 200 prints in India. In addition to the Indian release, it was released in Singapore, Australia, South Africa and the United States. The film underperformed at the box office, earning ₹33.5 million (US$350,000) at the box office against a budget of ₹50 million (US$520,000). The film was released on DVD on 14 September 2010, and is available on Netflix.

== Reception ==
=== Critical reception ===
Udaan was acclaimed by critics with particular praise on direction and the performances. Writing for The Times of India, film critic Nikhat Kazmi called Udaan "unconventional Bollywood at its biting best" and stated that it "has the edgy feel and the bittersweet emotional core characteristic of India's neo-wave cinema." Mayank Shekhar also gave it a positive review: "The movie's certainly worth a trip back to somewhat figure why." Rajeev Masand mentioned it as one of the year's best films, and said that Motwane makes "a terrific directing debut, offering up a film whose images will linger in your head long after you've left your seat."

Kaveere Bamzai of India Today described the film as "an extraordinary story told without veering into the maudlin": "It's a tightly controlled drama without any melodrama." Pratim D. Gupta said, "For every rupee you have wasted on big, bad Bolly noise, you must back this beautiful and brave voice." Sukanya Verma of Rediff.com felt that the film "refreshingly distinct and unyielding" and an "enriching experience." According to an Indo-Asian News Service review, "Udaan is both a celebration and a triumph of that spirit rebellious." Blessy Chettiar of Daily News and Analysis praised Barmecha's performance, calling him a "raw talent" who plays "a wide emotional range with panache."

Namrata Joshi of Outlook praised Roy's performance as the father and wrote, "It's a sharp, concentrated look at a troubled father-son relationship, how each of them, and the people around them, cope with their mercurial ways." Shubhra Gupta of The Indian Express said that the film is both "terrific" and "moving". She also included it in her book 50 Films That Changed Bollywood, 1995–2015. Although Sonia Chopra of Sify called Roy a "real discovery", she opined that some scenes appeared "inconsistent and a bit too cute for a cutting-edge film of this nature." Baradwaj Rangan observed that Udaan is "at heart, a feel-good fairy tale", and praised Roy's multidimensional character. Alissa Simon of Variety was more critical, however: "Earnest, predictable, conventionally-crafted Udaan brings nothing new to the coming-of-age genre in this tale of a fraught relationship between a sensitive teen and his abusive, controlling father, which adopts the style of popular Indian melodrama." Rachel Saltz of The New York Times felt that the film "covers familiar first-film ground with emotional conviction and freshness."

The film was mentioned in critic and author Shubhra Gupta's book, 50 Films That Changed Bollywood, 1995–2015.

== Awards ==
Year	Awards	Category	Nominee	Status	Ref
2011	56th Filmfare Awards	Best Film (Critics)	Vikramaditya Motwane	Won	
2011	56th Filmfare Awards	Best Story	Vikramaditya Motwane, Anurag Kashyap	Won	
2011	56th Filmfare Awards	Best Screenplay	Vikramaditya Motwane, Anurag Kashyap	Won	
2011	56th Filmfare Awards	Best Supporting Actor	Ronit Roy	Won	
2011	56th Filmfare Awards	Best Cinematography	Mahendra Shetty	Won	
2011	56th Filmfare Awards	Best Background Music	Amit Trivedi	Won	
2011	56th Filmfare Awards	Best Audiography	Kunal Sharma	Won	
2011	56th Filmfare Awards	Best Film	Anurag Kashyap Films, UTV Spotboy	Nominated	
2011	56th Filmfare Awards	Best Director	Vikramaditya Motwane	Nominated	
2011	Screen Awards	Best Film	Anurag Kashyap Films, UTV Spotboy	Won	
2011	Screen Awards	Best Actor in a Negative Role	Ronit Roy	Won	
2011	Screen Awards	Best Actor in a Supporting Role	Ram Kapoor	Nominated	
2011	Zee Cine Awards	Best Film (Critics)	Anurag Kashyap Films, UTV Spotboy	Won	
2011	Zee Cine Awards	Best Director (Critics)	Vikramaditya Motwane	Won	
2011	Zee Cine Awards	Best Actor in a Negative Role	Ronit Roy	Won	
2011	Giffoni Film Festival	Best Music Score	Amit Trivedi	Won	
2011	Indian Film Festival (Los Angeles)	Grand Jury Award	—N/a	Won	
2011	IIFA Awards	Best Actor in a Negative Role	Ronit Roy	Nominated	
2011	Producers Guild Film Awards	Best Actor in a Negative Role	Ronit Roy	Nominated	
2011	Mirchi Music Awards	Upcoming Male Vocalist of The Year	Mohan - "Naav"	Nominated	
