= Ronnie Screwvala =

Indian entrepreneur and film producer (born 1956)

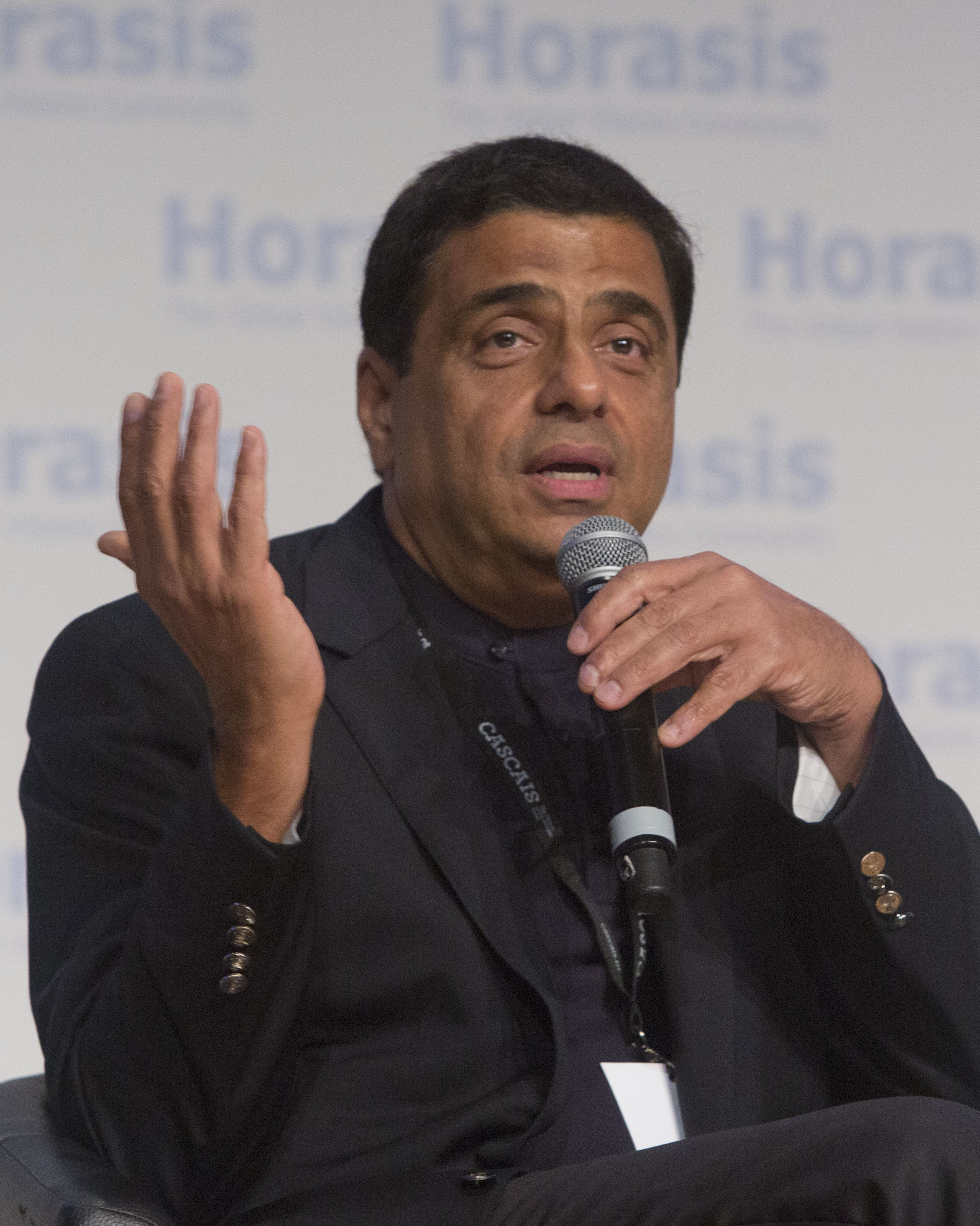
- Screwvala in 2016
- Born: Rohinton Soli Screwvala; 8 September 1956 (age 70); Bombay, Bombay State, India (present-day Mumbai, Maharashtra)
- Occupations: Entrepreneur; Film producer; Businessman; Investor
- Years active: 1981–present
- Organization(s): UTV Group (now Walt Disney India); Swades Foundation; Unilazer Ventures; AIESEC India; RSVP Movies upGrad
- Spouse(s): Manjula Nanavati (divorced) Zarina Mehta
- Children: 1
- Relatives: Suhail Chandhok (son-in-law)

Rohinton Soli Screwvala (born 8 September 1956), known professionally as Ronnie Screwvala, is an Indian entrepreneur, businessman, investor, and film producer. He has been named on Esquire's List of the 75 Most Influential People of the 21st Century in 2008 and ranked 78 among the 100 most influential people in the world on the Time 100. He was also listed amongst 25 Asia's Most Powerful people by Fortune Magazine.

Ronnie is considered a pioneer of cable television, built a media and entertainment conglomerate (UTV Software Communications) that partnered with News Corp, 20th Century Fox, The Walt Disney Company, and Bloomberg, and later in 2012, he divested the company to Disney for an enterprise value of US$1.4 billion.

From 2013 onward, he and his wife scaled their non-profit, The Swades Foundation, whose goal is to work with a million people in rural India, empower them, and move them out of poverty every 6–7 years before moving onto another geography. Cofounded UpGrad, which is into online education in the higher education and specialization sector, founded a sports company—U Sports—spanning football, e-sports, and kabaddi, and through his investment company, Unilazer Ventures, has been a significant private equity investor in Indian start-ups with early stage investment and significant minority stakes. After his entrepreneurial period, he founded creative content company RSVP Movies to produce movies and digital content. He has also launched a personal $50 million fund to invest in early-stage AI, deeptech, and space-tech startups.

== Early life and education ==
Screwvala was born in Bombay (now Mumbai) into a Parsi family. His father was an executive at the British firm J L Morrison and Smith & Nephew. Screwvala schooled and went to college in Mumbai at Cathedral and John Connon School and Sydenham College. Screwvala had a keen interest in theatre while in school and acted in professional plays with Bombay theatre as a hobby. He played notable roles in Shakespeare's Othello and Death of a Salesman.

== Personal life ==
Screwvala is married to Zarina Mehta, his second marriage. Zarina has been a co-founder in the media company UTV they founded, and now is the co-Trustee of their Philanthropic foundation; The Swades Foundation. They live in Breach Candy, South Mumbai. His first wife, Manjula Nanavati and Screwvala have one daughter, Trishya Screwvala, who runs her own Not For Profit, The Lighthouse Project, and who is married to sports commentator Suhail Chandhok.

== Career ==
=== Early days ===
Opportunistic in the early days of his entrepreneurship, Screwvala founded a toothbrush manufacturing company. Screwvala's is also credited with pioneering Cable TV in India (1981) at a time when there was a single terrestrial channel (Doordarshan) and grew that to multiple cities and most of the hotel chains in India.

=== United Television (UTV) 1990-2012 ===
Screwvala founded UTV and over the period grew it into a media conglomerate spanning a leading movie studio, a Games Studio and creative content company that went public and listed on stock exchanges in 2005 and into which Disney gradually took a substantial stake until he divested the whole company to them in 2012.

=== 2013 onwards ===
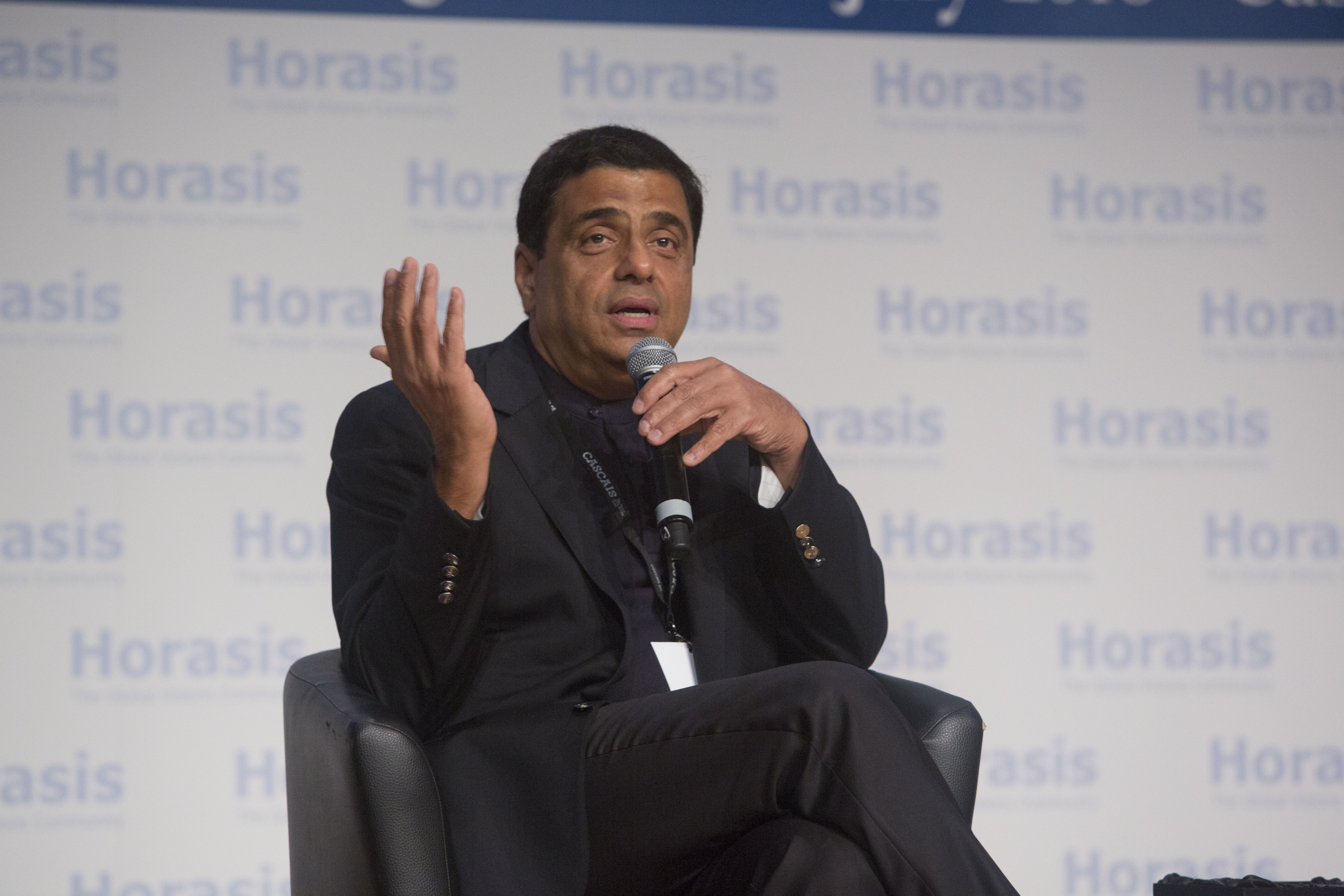
Screwvala at the Horasis India Meeting in 2016.

==== The Swades Foundation ====
Along with his wife Zarina, Ronnie has founded The Swades Foundation, named after the acclaimed film he produced, whose goal is to lift a million people out of poverty.

Presently, Swades is active in Raigad district in the state of Maharashtra in two thousand villages and involving half a million people. It is working on Water, Sanitation, Health, Education and the main focus is on Livelihood opportunities.

==== upGrad ====
Screwvala co-founded upGrad, which is one of the largest Online Education companies in India - focused on the higher Education and Specialization sector. They focus majorly on Digital Marketing, Data Analytics, Digital Technology Management, Data Driven Management and Product Management. upGrad has tie-ups with several colleges including MICA.

==== USports ====
Screwvala co-founded U Sports with a focus on three sports, Kabaddi a popular sport in India and around Asia (his team U Mumba is one of the top teams in the 12 team Pro Kabaddi League), E Sports and in Football where under the brand U Dreams the focus is to train and manage talent under various years of age for a sustained duration, and then manage their careers for the long term to play professionally in India and globally.

==== RSVP Movies ====
RSVP Movies is a film production company established by Ronnie Screwvala. The company develops original scripts and screenplays in collaboration with various directors.

==== Unilazer ====
Unilazer was incorporated by Screwvala as a public equity company that has made investments in the Indian new economy companies with early stage investments with significant minority stake as also bringing with him his entrepreneurial experience to the founders. The sectors in which Unilazer has invested range from e commerce to a leading online eyewear company in India, and from AI and Bots to Agriculture to Microhousing Finance.

=== International film industry ===
Screwvala has contributed to the international reach of Indian cinema. In 2017, his company RSVP produced Love per Square Foot, the first mainstream Indian film to premiere exclusively on Netflix, reaching subscribers in 190 countries. In 2018, Screwvala produced Mard Ko Dard Nahi Hota premiered at the Toronto International Film Festival in Canada, where it won the People's Choice Midnight Madness Award. That year, Screwvala also participated in the "Shalom Bollywood" event in Mumbai, describing closer India–Israel film-industry ties as "a lovely move", citing the two countries' shared entrepreneurial culture.

== Filmography ==
=== Films ===
The following is a list of films produced / co-produced by Screwvala

| Year | Title |
|---|---|
| 1997 | Dil Ke Jharoke Main |
| 2000 | Fiza |
| 2004 | Lakshya |
| 2004 | Swades |
| 2005 | D |
| 2005 | Main, Meri Patni Aur Woh |
| 2005 | The Blue Umbrella |
| 2006 | Rang De Basanti |
| 2006 | Chup Chup Ke |
| 2006 | The Namesake |
| 2006 | Khosla Ka Ghosla |
| 2007 | I Think I Love My Wife |
| 2007 | Hattrick |
| 2007 | Life in a Metro |
| 2007 | Dhan Dhana Dhan Goal |
| 2008 | Phir Kabhi |
| 2008 | Jodhaa Akbar |
| 2008 | Aamir |
| 2008 | The Happening |
| 2008 | A Wednesday |
| 2008 | Poi Solla Porom |
| 2008 | Welcome to Sajjanpur |
| 2008 | Fashion |
| 2008 | Oye Lucky! Lucky Oye! |
| 2009 | Dev D |
| 2009 | Delhi-6 |
| 2009 | Dhoondte Reh Jaaoge |
| 2009 | ExTerminators |
| 2009 | Harishchandrachi Factory |
| 2009 | Agyaat: The Unknown |
| 2009 | Kaminey: The Scoundrels |
| 2009 | Aagey Se Right |
| 2009 | What's Your Raashee? |
| 2009 | Main Aurr Mrs Khanna |
| 2010 | Chance Pe Dance |
| 2010 | Peepli Live |
| 2010 | Udaan |
| 2010 | I Hate Luv Storys |
| 2010 | Phillum City |
| 2010 | Paan Singh Tomar |
| 2010 | Guzaarish |
| 2010 | Tees Maar Khan |
| 2011 | No One Killed Jessica |
| 2011 | 7 Khoon Maaf |
| 2011 | Thank You |
| 2011 | Delhi Belly |
| 2011 | Chillar Party |
| 2011 | Deiva Thirumagal |
| 2011 | Muran |
| 2011 | My Friend Pinto |
| 2012 | Vettai |
| 2012 | Vazhakku Enn 18/9 |
| 2012 | Grandmaster |
| 2012 | Arjun: The Warrior Prince |
| 2012 | Rowdy Rathore |
| 2012 | Mugamoodi |
| 2012 | Barfi! |
| 2012 | Heroine |
| 2012 | Husbands in Goa |
| 2012 | Thaandavam |
| 2013 | ABCD (Any Body Can Dance) |
| 2013 | Kai Po Che! |
| 2013 | Himmatwala |
| 2013 | Settai |
| 2013 | Ghanchakkar |
| 2013 | Chennai Express |
| 2013 | Satyagraha |
| 2013 | Shahid |
| 2013 | The Lunchbox |
| 2013 | Ivan Veramathiri |
| 2018 | Love per Square Foot |
| 2018 | Lust Stories |
| 2018 | Karwaan |
| 2018 | Pihu |
| 2018 | Kedarnath |
| 2019 | Uri: The Surgical Strike |
| 2019 | Sonchiriya |
| 2019 | Mard Ko Dard Nahi Hota |
| 2019 | The Sky Is Pink |
| 2019 | Bhangra Paa Le |
| 2019 | Raat Akeli Hai |
| 2020 | Ghost Stories |
| 2020 | Mismatched |
| 2021 | Pitta Kathalu |
| 2021 | Dhamaka |
| 2022 | Mahi Mera Nikka Jeha |
| 2023 | Mission Majnu |
| 2023 | Lust Stories 2 |
| 2023 | Tarla |
| 2023 | Tumse Na Ho Payega |
| 2023 | Tejas |
| 2024 | Pippa |
| 2024 | Sam Bahadur |
| 2024 | Ullozhukku |
| 2025 | Azaad |
| 2026 | Satluj |

=== Television ===
| Year | Title1 | Notes |
|---|---|---|
| 1994–1998 | Shanti | |
| 1997–1998 | Sea Hawks | |
| 1998 | Saaya | |
| 1998–2001 | Hip Hip Hurray | |
| 2000–2004 | Shaka Laka Boom Boom | namaste |
| 2000 | For Better or For Worse | executive producer |
| 2001–2003 | Sarhadein | |
| 2002–2008 | Bhabhi | |
| 2002–2005 | Kehta Hai Dil | |
| 2002–2004 | Khichdi | executive producer |
| 2003 | Salanam | |
| 2003 | Toad Patrol | Miscellaneous crew |
| 2003–2007 | Shararat | |
| 2004–2006 | Meher | |
| 2004 | Rooh | |
| 2004–2005 | Special Squad | |
| 2005 | Bombay Talking | |
| 2005–2007 | Hero - Bhakti Hi Shakti Hai | |
| 2005–2006 | Sanya | executive producer |
| 2006 | Kabhie To Nazar Milao | |
| 2024 | Shark Tank India | |

== Awards ==
| Year | Award | Category | Film |
|---|---|---|---|
| 2007 | National Film Awards | Best Popular Film Providing Wholesome Entertainment | Rang De Basanti |
| 2007 | Filmfare Awards | Best Film | Rang De Basanti |
| 2009 | Filmfare Awards | Best Film | Jodhaa Akbar |
| 2013 | Filmfare Awards | Best Film | Barfi! |
