= List of awards and nominations received by Anushka Sharma =

Anushka Sharma awards and nominations
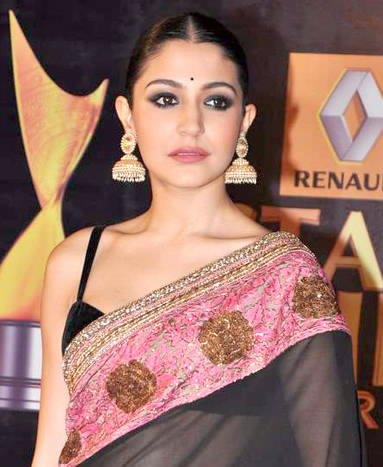
- Sharma at Star Guild Awards in 2013
Awards and nominations
Award	Wins	Nominations
Smita Patil Memorial Award	1	–
Filmfare Awards	1	8
Screen Awards	1	12
Zee Cine Awards	3	8
Stardust Awards	4	9
Producers Guild Film Awards	2	6
IIFA Awards	3	7
Star Guild Awards	3	7
BIG Star Entertainment Awards	0	9
Nickelodeon Kids' Choice Awards	0	2
Indian Film Festival of Melbourne	0	3
Filmfare OTT Awards	0	1
Times of India Film Awards	0	3

Totals (Note: Certain award groups do not simply award one winner. They acknowledge several different recipients, have runners-up, and have third place. Since this is a specific recognition and is different from losing an award, runner-up mentions are considered wins in this award tally. For simplification and to avoid errors, each award in this list has been presumed to have had a prior nomination.)
- Wins: 34
- Nominations: 80

Anushka Sharma is an Indian actress who appears in Hindi films. Sharma is the recipient of more than 30 awards into her credit. She has won three IIFA Awards and three Star Guild Awards and won the Filmfare Award for Best Supporting Actress for her performance in the 2012 romance Jab Tak Hai Jaan. She has received seven more Filmfare Award nominations, including Best Female Debut for Rab Ne Bana Di Jodi (2008), Best Actress for Rab Ne Bana Di Jodi, Band Baaja Baaraat (2010), NH10 (2015), and her acclaimed performances in Ae Dil Hai Mushkil (2016); Best Supporting Actress for Dil Dhadakne Do (2015), and Best Actress (Critics) for acclaimed work in Sui Dhaaga (2018).

== Film awards ==
Year	Film	Award	Category	Result	Ref.
2009	Rab Ne Bana Di Jodi	Filmfare Awards	Best Actress	Nominated	
2009	Rab Ne Bana Di Jodi	Filmfare Awards	Best Female Debut	Nominated	
2009	Rab Ne Bana Di Jodi	Screen Awards	Most Promising Newcomer – Female	Nominated	
2009	Rab Ne Bana Di Jodi	Star Guild Awards	Best Female Debut	Won	
2009	Rab Ne Bana Di Jodi	Producers Guild Film Awards	Best Female Debut	Won	
2009	Rab Ne Bana Di Jodi	Stardust Awards	Superstar of Tomorrow – Female	Nominated	
2011	Band Baaja Baaraat	Stardust Awards	Best Comedy/Romance Actress	Nominated	
2011	Band Baaja Baaraat	Filmfare Awards	Best Actress	Nominated	
2011	Band Baaja Baaraat	International Indian Film Academy Awards	Best Actress	Won	
2011	Band Baaja Baaraat	International Indian Film Academy Awards	Hottest Pair (along with Ranveer Singh)	Won	
2011	Band Baaja Baaraat	International Indian Film Academy Awards	IIFA 20 Years Award for Best Actress	Nominated	
2011	Band Baaja Baaraat	Screen Awards	Best Actress	Nominated	
2011	Band Baaja Baaraat	Star Guild Awards	Best Actress in a Leading Role	Won	
2011	Band Baaja Baaraat	BIG Star Entertainment Awards	Most Entertaining Film Actor – Female	Nominated	
2011	Band Baaja Baaraat	Zee Cine Awards	Best Actor – Female	Nominated	
2011	Band Baaja Baaraat	Producers Guild Film Awards	Best Actress In A Leading Role	Won	
2012	Ladies vs Ricky Bahl	Stardust Awards	Star of the Year – Female	Nominated	
2012	Ladies vs Ricky Bahl	Stardust Awards	Best Comedy/Romance Actress	Won	
2013	Jab Tak Hai Jaan	Stardust Awards	Best Comedy/Romance Actress	Won	
2013	Jab Tak Hai Jaan	Filmfare Awards	Best Supporting Actress	Won	
2013	Jab Tak Hai Jaan	International Indian Film Academy Awards	Best Supporting Actress	Won	
2013	Jab Tak Hai Jaan	Colors Screen Awards	Best Actress	Nominated	
2013	Jab Tak Hai Jaan	Colors Screen Awards	Best Supporting Actress	Nominated	
2013	Jab Tak Hai Jaan	BIG Star Entertainment Awards	Most Entertaining Film Actor – Female	Nominated	
2013	Jab Tak Hai Jaan	BIG Star Entertainment Awards	Most Entertaining Actor in a Romantic Role – Female	Nominated	
2013	Jab Tak Hai Jaan	Times of India Film Awards	Best Supporting Actress	Nominated	
2013	Jab Tak Hai Jaan	Producers Guild Film Awards	Best Supporting Actress	Nominated	
2013	Jab Tak Hai Jaan	Zee Cine Awards	Best Supporting Actress	Won	
2013	Jab Tak Hai Jaan	Screen Awards	Best Supporting Actress	Nominated	
2013	Jab Tak Hai Jaan	Star Guild Awards	Best Supporting Actress	Nominated	
2015	PK	Star Guild Awards	Best Actress	Nominated	
2015	PK	Stardust Awards	Best Actor of the Year (Female)	Nominated	
2015	PK	Indian Film Festival of Melbourne	Best Actress	Nominated	
2015	PK	International Indian Film Academy Awards	Best Actress	Nominated	
2015	PK	Producers Guild Film Awards	Best Actress	Nominated	
2015	PK	BIG Star Entertainment Awards	Most Entertaining Actor in a Social Role – Female	Nominated	
2016	NH10	BIG Star Entertainment Awards	Most Entertaining Actor in a Social Role – Female	Nominated	
2016	NH10	BIG Star Entertainment Awards	Most Entertaining Social Film	Nominated	
2016	NH10	BIG Star Entertainment Awards	Most Entertaining Thriller Film	Nominated	
2016	NH10	BIG Star Entertainment Awards	Most Entertaining Actor in a Thriller Role – Female	Nominated	
2016	NH10	Indian Film Festival of Melbourne	Best Actress	Nominated	
2016	NH10	Jagran Film Festival	Best Actress	Nominated	
2016	NH10	Star Guild Awards	Best Actress	Nominated	
2016	NH10	Star Guild Awards	K. A. Abbas Honour for Social Consciousness	Won	
2016	NH10	Stardust Awards	Performer of the Year (Female)	Nominated	
2016	NH10	Filmfare Awards	Best Actor in a Leading Role (Female)	Nominated	
2016	NH10	Screen Awards	Best Actress (Popular Choice)	Nominated	
2016	NH10	Times of India Film Awards	Best Actress	Nominated	
2016	NH10	Times of India Film Awards	Best Actor (Female) – Critics' Choice	Nominated	
2016	NH10	Zee Cine Awards	Best Actor (Female) – Viewers' Choice	Nominated	
2016	NH10	Producers Guild Film Awards	Best Actress	Nominated	
2016	Dil Dhadakne Do	Producers Guild Film Awards	Best Supporting Actress	Nominated	
2016	Dil Dhadakne Do	Star Guild Awards	Best Supporting Actress	Nominated	
2016	Dil Dhadakne Do	Filmfare Awards	Best Supporting Actress	Nominated	
2016	Dil Dhadakne Do	International Indian Film Academy Awards	Best Supporting Actress	Nominated	
2016	Dil Dhadakne Do	Screen Awards	Best Actress (Popular Choice)	Nominated	
2016	Dil Dhadakne Do	Screen Awards	Best Jodi (Popular Choice) (along with Ranveer Singh)	Nominated	
2016	Dil Dhadakne Do	Screen Awards	Best Ensemble Cast	Won	
2016	Dil Dhadakne Do	BIG Star Entertainment Awards	Most Entertaining Actor in a Romantic Role – Female	Nominated	
2017	Sultan	Zee Cine Awards	Best Actor (Female) – Jury's Choice	Nominated	
2017	Sultan	Zee Cine Awards	Best Actor (Female) – Viewers' Choice	Won	
2017	Sultan	Screen Awards	Best Actress (Jury Choice)	Nominated	
2017	Sultan	Nickeledeon Kid's Choice Awards	Favourite Actress	Nominated	
2017	Sultan	Stardust Awards	Best Actress of the Year	Won	
2017	Ae Dil Hai Mushkil	Stardust Awards	Best Actress of the Year	Won	
2017	Ae Dil Hai Mushkil	Filmfare Awards	Best Actress	Nominated	
2017	Ae Dil Hai Mushkil	International Indian Film Academy Awards	Best Actress	Nominated	
2017	Ae Dil Hai Mushkil	Screen Awards	Best Actress	Nominated	
2019	Pari	Screen Awards	Best Actress (Critics)	Nominated	
2019	Pari	Critics' Choice Movie Awards	Best Actress	Nominated	
2019	Pari	Indian Film Festival of Melbourne	Best Actress	Nominated	
2019	Pari	Nickelodeon Kids' Choice Awards	Favorite Movie Actor (Female)	Nominated	
2019	Pari	Asian Awards	Best Actress (Jury's Choice)	Nominated	
2019	Pari	Zee Cine Awards	Best Actress in a Leading Role	Nominated	
2019	Pari	Zee Cine Awards	Best Actor (Female) – Jury's Choice	Won	
2019	Sui Dhaaga: Made in India	Zee Cine Awards	Best Actor (Female) – Viewers' Choice	Nominated	
2019	Sui Dhaaga: Made in India	Filmfare Awards	Best Actress (Critics)	Nominated	
2020	Bulbbul	Filmfare OTT Awards	Best Film, Web Original	Nominated	

== Other awards and recognitions ==
Year	Award / Organisation	Category	Result	Ref.
2012	Zee Cine Awards	International Female Icon	Won	
2012	People for the Ethical Treatment of Animals (PETA) India	Hottest Vegetarian Celebrity	Won	
2014	ETC Bollywood Business Awards	Highest Grossing Actress of the Year(for PK)	Won	
2015	People for the Ethical Treatment of Animals (PETA) India	Hottest Vegetarian Celebrity (along with Aamir Khan)	Won	
2016	ETC Bollywood Business Awards	Highest Grossing Actress of the Year(for Sultan)	Won	
2017	GQ Awards	Woman of the Year	Won	
2017	People for the Ethical Treatment of Animals (PETA) India	Person of the Year	Won	
2018	People for the Ethical Treatment of Animals (PETA) India	Hottest Vegetarian Celebrity (along with Kartik Aaryan)	Won	
2018	Smita Patil Memorial Award	Best Actress	Won	
2022	Pinkvilla Style Icons Awards	Super Stylish Actor Female (Popular Choice)	Nominated	
2023	Pinkvilla Style Icons Awards	Style Icon Of The Year - Reader's Choice	Nominated	
2023	Bollywood Hungama Style Icons	Most Stylish Iconic Performer (Female)	Won	

== Other honours ==
2009

- Listed in Super Cinema list of Best Debut Actress of the Decade (2000–2009)
- Listed in Femina List of "India's Most Beautiful Woman"

2010

- Listed in Rediff.com list of "Bollywood Best Actors "
- Listed in Femina List of India's "Most Beautiful Woman"

2011

- Listed in The Times of India "Most Desirable Woman"
- Listed in Femina List of India's "Most Beautiful Woman"
- Listed in Times Celebex List of Bollywood Stars
- 9th Most Searched Female Actor on Google India

2012

- Debut in India Forbes Celebrity 100
- Listed in Femina List of India's "Most Beautiful Woman"
- Listed in Times Celebex List of Bollywood Stars
- Listed in The Times of India "Most Desirable Woman"

2013

- Listed in Femina List of India's "Most Beautiful Woman"
- Listed in Vogue India List of Best Dressed Celebrities
- Listed in The Times of India "Most Desirable Woman"
- Listed in Times Celebex List of Bollywood Stars
- 2nd Most Searched Female Actor on Google India
- Listed in India Forbes Celebrity 100

2014

- Listed in Bollywood Hungama List of Highest Grossing Bollywood Actress
- Listed in Forbes Celebrity 100 India
- Listed in Femina List of India's "Most Beautiful Woman"
- Listed in The Times of India "Most Desirable Woman"
- Listed in Time's Celebex List of Bollywood Stars

2015

- Listed in Rediff.com's List of "Bollywood Best Actors"
- Listed in Huffington Post's List of Most Influential Woman on Twitter
- Listed in Forbes Celebrity 100 India
- Listed in Times Celebex List of Bollywood Stars
- Listed in The Times of India's "Times Most Desirable Women"
- Listed in Verve for Best Dressed Actress
- Listed in IMDb List of "Most Beautiful Woman"
- Listed in Filmfare Magazine Fashion Poll "Amazing with Androgyny"
- Listed in the List of Maxim Hot 100
- Listed in Femina List of India's Most Beautiful Women
- Listed in Bollywood Hungama List of Highest Grossing Bollywood Actress
- Listed in Vogue India List of Best Dressed Celebrities
- Listed in IMDb List of Top 10 Stars Of Indian Cinema

2016

- Listed in IMDb Top 10 Stars of Indian Cinema
- Listed in Forbes Celebrity 100 India
- Topped Bollywood Hungama's list of Highest Grossing Bollywood Actress
- Listed in Times Celebex List of Bollywood Stars
- Listed in Rediff.com List of "Bollywood Best Actors"
- 6th Most Searched Female Actor on Google India
- Listed in Vogue India List of Best Dressed Celebrities
- Listed in Verve for Best Dressed Actress
- Listed in The Times of India "Most Engaging" on Twitter
- Listed in IMDb List of "Most Beautiful Woman"
- Listed in The Times of India's "Times Most Desirable Women"
- Listed in the List of Maxim Hot 100 India
- Listed in Femina List of India's Most Beautiful Women

2017

- Listed in Power List Of "Top Actor Producer"
- Listed in IMDb Top 10 Stars of Indian Cinema
- Grab the Top most Spot in India Today Mood of the Nation Poll As "No 1 Heroine"
- Listed in Femina List of "India's Most Beautiful Women"
- Listed in Times Celebex List of Bollywood Stars
- 4th Top most Female Entertainment Handles on Twitter
- Listed in IMDb List of "Most Beautiful Woman"
- Listed in the List of Maxim Hot 100 India
- Listed in Vogue India List of "Best Dressed Celebrities"
- Listed in The Times of India "Most Desirable Woman"
- Listed in India Forbes Celebrity 100

2018

- Listed in Verve for "Best Dressed Actress"
- Listed in Maxim Hot 100
- Listed in Bollywood Hungama List of Highest Grossing Bollywood Actress
- Listed in Vogue India List of Best Dressed Celebrities
- Grab the Top most Spot in Times Celebex List of Bollywood Stars
- Listed in IMDb List of "Most Beautiful Woman"
- Grab the Top spot in India Today Mood of the Nation Poll As "No 1 Heroine"
- Listed in Score Trends "Most Influential Star on Social Media"
- Listed in India Today Top 50 Power People
- Listed in Femina List of India's Most Beautiful Women
- Listed in t2 Telegraph List of "Most Promising Gen-Y Actress"
- 4th Top most Female Entertainment Handles on Twitter
- Listed in Rediff.com's List of "Bollywood Best Actor"
- Listed in Forbes 30 Under 30 Asia
- Listed in Fortune India's List of "Most Powerful Woman in Business "
- Listed in India Forbes Celebrity 100

2019

- 2nd top most Female Entertainment Handles on Twitter
- Listed in Fortune India's List Of "Most Powerful Woman in Business"
- Listed in bestofthelist.com List of "Most Beautiful Indian Actress"
- Listed in Femina List of "India's Most Beautiful Woman"
- Listed in IMDb "Most Beautiful Woman"
- Ranked No. 2 in India Today Mood of the Nation Poll As No 1 Heroine
- Ranked 11th in Celebrity Brand Ranking by Duff & Phelps
- Listed in India Forbes Celebrity 100

2020

- Listed in Super Cinema List of Top 10 Heroines Of Today
- Listed in Super Cinema List of Highest Grossing Bollywood Actress of the Decade (2010–2019)
- Listed in Ormax Stars India List of "Most Popular Female Stars of the Decade (2010-19)"
- Grab the No. 1 Spot in Score Trend India List of "Most Popular Actress on Twitter 2019"
- Ranked 18th in Celebrity Brand ranking by Duff & Phelps in 2019.
- Ranked #2 among actresses in India Today's Mood of the Nation survey for 2019.
- Featured in BW Businessworld List of "Most Influential Woman"
- Listed in Global Woman Powerhouse Producer List of "Most Powerful Woman Producer in the World"
- Ranked #5th in India Today's Mood of the Nation Survey as "India's Most Popular Bollywood Actress" in 2020
- Ranked #4th in the List of CEO World Magazine Of "Top 10 Richest Bollywood Actress"
- Ranked 48 in Yahoo India's List of "50 Most Influential People"
- Listed in Forbes Asia's 100 Digital Star
- Listed in Fortune India List of "Most Powerful Woman in Business"
- Ranked #25 in the Global List of "100 Instagram Influencers"
- Ranked #45 in the Eastern Eye List of "Top 50 Asian Celebrities"
- Ranked 5th in India Today "Mood of the Nation Poll" A No 1 Heroine
- Ranked 13 in the List of Wizikey Rank and Score
