= Band Baaja Baaraat =

2010 Indian film by Maneesh Sharma

- Theatrical release poster
- Directed by: Maneesh Sharma
- Written by: Habib Faisal
- Story by: Maneesh Sharma
- Produced by: Aditya Chopra
- Starring: Ranveer Singh; Anushka Sharma
- Cinematography: Aseem Mishra
- Edited by: Namrata Rao
- Music by: Salim–Sulaiman
- Production company: Yash Raj Films
- Distributed by: Yash Raj Films
- Release date: 10 December 2010
- Running time: 140 minutes
- Country: India
- Language: Hindi
- Box office: ₹96 crore

Band Baaja Baaraat (transl. Wedding Party Band) is a 2010 Indian Hindi-language romantic comedy film directed by Maneesh Sharma in his directorial debut, written by Habib Faisal, and produced by Aditya Chopra under Yash Raj Films. The film stars Ranveer Singh in his debut lead acting role and Anushka Sharma. In the film, Shruti Kakkar (Sharma) and Bittoo Sharma (Singh) team up to create a wedding planning enterprise.

Band Baaja Baaraat was released worldwide on 10 December 2010, and was a commercial success. Upon release, it received widespread critical acclaim, with praise for its novel setting, screenplay, soundtrack and the leads' performances.

At the 56th Filmfare Awards, Band Baaja Baaraat received 6 nominations including Best Film, Best Director, and Best Actress, and won two awards—Best Male Debut (Singh) and Best Debut Director (Maneesh Sharma). A Tamil remake titled Aaha Kalyanam was also produced by Aditya Chopra under Yash Raj Films, starring Nani and Vaani Kapoor in the lead roles and was released on 21 February 2014.

== Plot ==
Bittoo and Shruti are graduating college students. Shruti convinces her family to not marry her off so soon and let her pursue her dream of being a wedding planner. She meets Bittoo who did videography work at a wedding she was at. Initially she is frustrated with him. After he catches her on a bus the next day, he gives her a DVD with her dancing, and she opens up and tells him about her plans to start the wedding business.

When Bittoo's Dad, who works in farming sugarcanes, visits Bittoo by surprise he reiterates his plans to make Bittoo work in the family business which Bittoo doesn't want. Instead Bittoo claims to his Dad that he is going to work on wedding planning, and his Dad (not believing he will be successful) gives him enough to pay the bus fare back home. Catching up with Shruti, he convinces her to let the two work together. Shruti tries to approach Chandra Maam, a popular wedding planner for high class society and Bittoo helps them both get hired on. But then they find her company pockets funds and doesn't deliver what is promised.

During an army general's wedding, after getting in a fight with the manager they storm off and decide to start her own business. They manage weddings for lower middle-class families, usually held in the Chandni Chowk neighbourhood of Old Delhi. They are successful in organizing a series of weddings on a shoestring budget, with Bittoo's college band providing live music and the pair do some choreography themselves. They earn enough to rent an office and move in together.

Sainik Farm is the prime wedding location in Delhi where the rich and famous hold their weddings. Bittoo and Shruti eavesdrop on Chandra Maam's propositions to a wealthy couple, then catch up to them later and tell them her company is a ruse. The couple decided to give them their first big Sainik Farm wedding contract. The event becomes a resounding success, and the Shaadi Mubarak team celebrates late into the night. After guests have left, Bittoo and Shruti end up having sex.

Bittoo labels the affair a kaand (lit. "blunder"), knowing that Shruti has strict rules against workplace romance. He soon realises that Shruti does not see their affair as a strictly one-time encounter, and has started developing feelings for him instead. Bittoo starts distancing himself from her, hurting Shruti's feelings by his sudden change of demeanour. She pushes him out of Shaadi Mubarak, and Bittoo launches a rival venture called "Happy Wedding" - a literal translation of the name "Shaadi Mubarak". Without Shruti's involvement, his venture does not take off. Meanwhile, Shuti begins losing clients and vendors after multiple complaints about the quality of her latest work.

To save their respective ventures from becoming bankrupt, Bittoo and Shruti accept a joint contract for a wealthy industrialist's daughter's wedding. Expected to be a lavish, week-long affair, it will be held at an historic palace in the state of Rajasthan. The wedding calls for Shah Rukh Khan to perform, but he cancels last minute due to injury. Bittoo steps in for him and pleases the guests with his dancing.

Working together again, Bittoo and Shruti bring their characteristic flair to the preparations but Shruti seems distracted. Bittoo learns that she is engaged to marry a wealthy NRI, and will move soon to Dubai where she will restart Shaadi Mubarak. Seeing her slipping away from him, Bittoo confesses his feelings for her as well, claiming he was merely pushing her away since he didn't know how to react after they spent the night together. They share a kiss together and Shruti calls off her engagement.

After the Rajasthan wedding contract, Bittoo rejoins Shaadi Mubarak. As credits roll, he and Shruti are busy enjoying their own wedding, planned in typical Shaadi Mubarak-fashion.

== Cast ==
- Ranveer Singh as Bittoo Sharma
- Anushka Sharma as Shruti Kakkar
- Neeraj Sood as Maqsood, florist
- Puru Chibber as Mika, Bittoo's best friend
- Manish Choudhary as Sidhwani
- Manit Joura as Sunny, cameraman
- Sushil Dahiya as Brigadier Brar
- Manu Rishi as Inspector
- Govind Pandey as Bittoo's father
- Vinod Verma as Shruti's father
- Nirupama Chopra as Shruti's mother
- Pushvinder Rathore as Shruti's sister
- Shena Gamat as Chanda Narang, a famous wedding planner
- Manmeet Singh as Rajinder Singh, caterer
- Shireena Sambyal as Sonia

== Production ==
"Anushka Sharma and I have been friends for a long time, and we have a very comfortable love-hate relationship – more hate and less love from her side!"

— Maneesh Sharma

=== Development ===
Band Baaja Baaraat marked the directorial debut of Maneesh Sharma, who had previously assisted on Rab Ne Bana Di Jodi (2008). Early media reports speculated titles like Shaadi Mubarak but Yash Raj Films clarified in that the film was still untitled. The official title, Band Baaja Baaraat, was announced in late 2010.

=== Casting ===
Anushka Sharma was given the female lead in the film, completing the three-film contract she signed to do Rab Ne Bana Di Jodi (2008), her first film. Her role was described as "challenging" by media publications prior to the film's release. Describing the way the lead characters in the film talk as "crude but cute", the actress declared that the hardest part of her job was speaking like a typical Delhi wali girl, which called for her to "talk fast, sometimes mix words and even omit words completely". Director Maneesh Sharma, with whom she's been great friends since her first film, said that the model-turned-actress was a very feisty person, and a natural actress who didn't like doing multiple takes. She described the film as "very much, a young love story set in Delhi".

The male lead was given to Mumbai-native Ranveer Singh, a complete newcomer with no prior acting or modelling experience whatsoever, who impressed producer Aditya Chopra so much that he cast him after his first audition, signing a three-film contract with the actor. Singh, who took acting classes, and hung out at Delhi University prior to shooting said about his casting "I’m the first solo hero Yash Raj is launching. It’s a huge deal for me. I don’t know how I got here. I guess I happened to be in the right place at the right time". As such, this marks the first time a film rests mainly on Sharma's shoulders, as opposed to her prior films Rab Ne Bana Di Jodi and Badmaash Company (2010) where she shared the screen with more experienced co-stars, Shah Rukh Khan and Shahid Kapoor respectively, a fact the actress remarked upon, stating "some people will refer to Band Baaja Baaraat as Anushka Sharma’s film because they have seen me in another film before".

=== Filming ===
Filming started in Delhi on 4 February 2010, the same day the production company announcement was made. Singh was very nervous about his first day but was eventually proud that his first scene only took three takes to shoot. An 18 February article by Minakshi Saini for the Hindustan Times' entertainment supplement HT City reported that during the previous day's early morning shoot in West Delhi's Subhash Nagar, Singh's newcomer status led many to speculate on whether he was Ranbir Kapoor, Ranvir Shorey or even Riteish Deshmukh. Police officers were eventually called in to secure the set from curious onlookers, however some expressed discontentment at having to be out in the cold despite both lead actors being virtual unknowns. The film features a kiss between the lead actors, which only necessitated a single take. Other than Subhash Nagar DDA Market, locations in Delhi include Janakpuri, Delhi University, North and West Delhi, Ring Road, Mehrauli Farms and Akbar Road. Some scenes were also shot in director Maneesh Sharma's almamater, Hans Raj College in University campus. The film was additionally shot in Mumbai in March and Rajasthan in April.

The assistant directors for the film were Akshat Kapil and Rohit Philip who'd previously held the job on Aaja Nachle (2007) and Do Dooni Chaar (2010) respectively. Aseem Mishra handled the cinematography after working on such films as Contract (2008), New York (2009) and Once Upon a Time in Mumbaai (2010). The various dance sequences were choreographed by Vaibhavi Merchant, who has previously worked on countless films including such hits as Lagaan (2001), Devdas (2002), Veer-Zaara and Swades (both 2004). Sonal Choudhry and T. P. Abid were the film's production designers while Niharika Khan was the costume designer.

Several rumours surrounded the film's shoot, such as speculation that the lead pair were more than just friends. Early media reports alternatively titled the film Shaadi Mubarak or Shaadi Mubarak Ho, however Yash Raj Films eventually issued a press release in late April claiming that this was not the film's title, and that film was actually still untitled. The title was eventually revealed to be Band Baaja Baaraat in late July.

Lead actors Sharma and Singh got along well during the shoot, and are strongly believed to have dated and broken up before the film's release. Speaking about his co-star, Singh declared "She’s intelligent, well-read and great to hang out with. Actually, she’s pretty close to my dream girl".

== Soundtrack ==
The soundtrack and background score for Band Baaja Baaraat were composed by the duo Salim–Sulaiman, marking another collaboration with Yash Raj Films following their work on Rab Ne Bana Di Jodi (2008), with lyrics penned by Amitabh Bhattacharya in his first mainstream endeavour. The album features vocals by Sunidhi Chauhan, Benny Dayal, Shreya Ghoshal, Natalie Di Luccio, Himani Kapoor, Harshdeep Kaur, Labh Janjua, Shraddha Pandit, Master Saleem, Sukhwinder Singh, Bhattacharya, and Salim Merchant.

The soundtrack consists of nine tracks, including two remix versions. It was first unveiled on 3 November 2010 at Yash Raj Studios in Andheri, Mumbai, and was officially launched on 10 November 2010 at a promotional event held at the Reliance TimeOut store in Bandra.

== Marketing and release ==
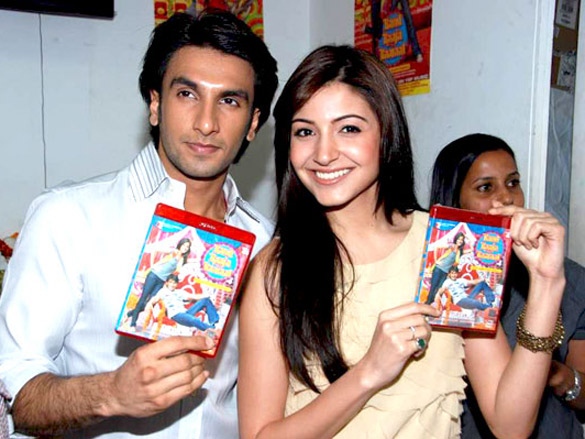
Ranveer Singh (left) with co-star Anushka Sharma at the DVD launch of Band Baaja Baaraat in 2010.

"We’re like a tiny paan shop if you compare us with the other releases in the same week or month, but this paan shop is the best of the lot"

— Anushka Sharma

As with previous Yash Raj Films productions since Mohabbatein (2000), publicity design for Band Baaja Baaraat was overseen by Fayyaz Badruddin, with stills photographed by Abhay Singh and Zahir Abbas Khan. The film's official trailer and website launched on 19 October 2010, featuring the synopsis, promotional images, downloadable wallpapers, a press kit, and e-cards branded as “Band Baaj-O-Grams.” The studio expanded its digital outreach through dedicated Facebook, Twitter, and Blogspot channels, as well as exclusive video content on YouTube, including music videos for "Tarkeebein" and "Ainvayi Ainvayi".

To promote the film, lead actors Ranveer Singh and Anushka Sharma, along with director Maneesh Sharma, made appearances at IIT Delhi's annual festival and at the GIP Mall in Noida. However, promotions briefly drew media attention following an incident aboard Kingfisher Airlines flight IT 331 on 26 October 2010, when the actors confronted a passenger who allegedly took unsolicited photographs. The altercation was resolved without formal complaints after police intervention upon landing in Delhi.

Despite skepticism regarding its commercial prospects due to the absence of a male star and Sharma's perceived lull in popularity post her debut contract with the studio, Band Baaja Baaraat gradually built momentum through word-of-mouth and targeted promotions. The film was theatrically released worldwide on 10 December 2010, coinciding nearly two years to the day with Sharma's debut Rab Ne Bana Di Jodi (2008)—a strategic choice by the studio aiming to replicate that film's success trajectory.

== Reception ==
=== Box office ===
Internationally, Band Baaja Baaraat had a limited release. In the United States and Canada, it grossed $43,820, while in the United Kingdom, it earned £63,200. The film's worldwide gross was approximately ₹300 million.

With a production budget of ₹130 million, the film was declared a "Hit" by Box Office India.

=== Critical reception ===
Upon release, Band Baaja Baaraat received positive reviews from critics. Taran Adarsh of Bollywood Hungama gave it 4/5 stars, commenting, "Thankfully, Band Baaja Baaraat works on every level. The writing is crisp, the execution of the material [director: Maneesh Sharma] is worthy, and the lead actors [Anushka, Ranveer] steer the film to the destination smoothly... Band Baaja Baaraat is honest, fresh, youthful, and extremely entertaining. Recommended!"

Anupama Chopra of NDTV awarded it 4/5 stars and commented, "Band Baaja Baaraat is reasonably entertaining. It's definitely the most fun you'll have in a theater this weekend." Rajeev Masand gave it 3/5 stars, writing, "Band Baaja Baaraat works because it’s invested with an earnestness that’s become increasingly rare to find at the movies... It’s a romantic comedy done correctly. Fun, but with warmth at its heart. Don’t miss it!"

Nikhat Kazmi of The Times of India gave the film 3/5 stars and opined, "As long as you view Band Baaja Baaraat as a loving, heartfelt take on what makes Delhi go dhak-dhak, the film holds your attention. Band Baaja Baaraat engages you with its fond look at fun-loving Dilliwalas." Sonal Dedhia of Rediff.com gave it 3/5, commenting, "On the whole, Band Baaja Baaraat is a refreshing film—very different from the usual romantic comedy movies we're so used to. It is a well-made film that should connect with the audience. Give this one a chance, you won't regret it."

== Accolades ==
Award	Date of the ceremony	Category	Recipients	Result	Ref.
Producers Guild Film Awards	11 January 2011	Best Actress in a Leading Role	Anushka Sharma (tied with Vidya Balan for Ishqiya)	Won	
Producers Guild Film Awards	11 January 2011	Best Male Debut	Ranveer Singh	Won	
Zee Cine Awards	14 January 2011	Best Actor – Female	Anushka Sharma	Nominated	
Zee Cine Awards	14 January 2011	Best Male Debut	Ranveer Singh	Won	
Screen Awards	22 January 2011	Best Actress	Anushka Sharma	Nominated	
Screen Awards	22 January 2011	Best Male Debut	Ranveer Singh	Won	
Filmfare Awards	29 January 2011	Best Film	Band Baaja Baaraat	Nominated	
Filmfare Awards	29 January 2011	Best Director	Maneesh Sharma	Nominated	
Filmfare Awards	29 January 2011	Best Actress	Anushka Sharma	Nominated	
Filmfare Awards	29 January 2011	Best Male Debut	Ranveer Singh	Won	
Filmfare Awards	29 January 2011	Best Debut Director	Maneesh Sharma	Won	
Filmfare Awards	29 January 2011	Best Scene of the Year	The bread pakora scene	Nominated	
Stardust Awards	6 February 2011	Best Actor in a Comedy or Romance	Ranveer Singh	Nominated	
Stardust Awards	6 February 2011	Superstar of Tomorrow – Male	Ranveer Singh	Won	
Stardust Awards	6 February 2011	Best Actress in a Comedy or Romance	Anushka Sharma	Nominated	
IIFA Awards	23–25 June 2011	Best Film	Band Baaja Baaraat	Nominated	
IIFA Awards	23–25 June 2011	Best Director	Maneesh Sharma	Nominated	
IIFA Awards	23–25 June 2011	Best Actress	Anushka Sharma	Won	
IIFA Awards	23–25 June 2011	Star Debut of the Year – Male	Ranveer Singh	Won	
IIFA Awards	23–25 June 2011	Hottest Pair	Anushka Sharma and Ranveer Singh	Won	
IIFA Awards	23–25 June 2011	Best Music Director	Salim–Sulaiman	Nominated	
IIFA Awards	23–25 June 2011	Best Lyricist	Amitabh Bhattacharya (for "Ainvayi Ainvayi")	Nominated	
IIFA Awards	23–25 June 2011	Best Female Playback Singer	Sunidhi Chauhan (for "Ainvayi Ainvayi")	Nominated	
IIFA Awards	23–25 June 2011	Best Story	Maneesh Sharma	Nominated	
IIFA Awards	23–25 June 2011	Best Dialogue	Habib Faisal	Nominated	
IIFA Awards	23–25 June 2011	Best Costume Design	Niharika Khan	Won	
IIFA Awards	23–25 June 2011	Best Editing	Namrata Rao	Won	
IIFA Awards	23–25 June 2011	Best Song Recording	Vijay Dayal (for "Ainvayi Ainvayi")	Won	

== See also ==
- Aaha Kalyanam (2014), the Tamil remake of the film
- Jamuna Paar, an Indian TV serial inspired by Band Baaja Baaraat
- Rishta.com (2010), an Indian TV serial produced by YRF on which the film is based on
- Jabardasth (2013), a Telugu film inspired from Band Baaja Baaraat
- Bollywood films of 2010
