= Anushka Sharma =

Indian actress and film producer (born 1988)

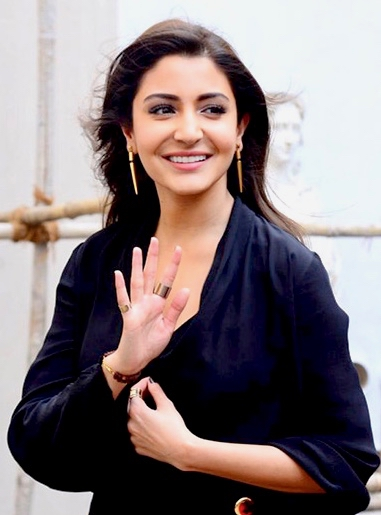
- Sharma in 2018
- Born: 1 May 1988 (age 38); Ayodhya, Uttar Pradesh, India
- Education: Mount Carmel College (B.A.)
- Occupation: Actress
- Years active: 2008–2022
- Spouse: Virat Kohli (m. 2017)
- Children: 2
- Awards: Full list

Signature
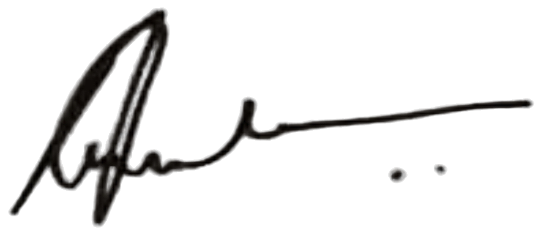

Anushka Sharma (pronounced [əˈnʊʃka ˈʃərma]; born 1 May 1988) is an Indian film actress and producer who works in Hindi films. One of the leading actresses of the 2010s, she is the recipient of several accolades, including one Filmfare Award and three IIFA Awards. Sharma has appeared in Forbes India's Celebrity 100 in the 2010s and was featured by Forbes Asia in their 30 Under 30 list of 2018.

Born in Ayodhya and raised in Bangalore, Sharma had her first modelling assignment for the fashion designer Wendell Rodricks in 2007 and later moved to Mumbai to pursue a full-time career as a model. She made her acting debut opposite Shah Rukh Khan in the top-grossing romantic film Rab Ne Bana Di Jodi (2008) and rose to prominence with starring roles in Yash Raj Films' romances Band Baaja Baaraat (2010) and Jab Tak Hai Jaan (2012), winning the Filmfare Award for Best Supporting Actress for the latter. Sharma went on to earn praise for playing strong-willed women in the crime thriller NH10 (2015), and the dramas Dil Dhadakne Do (2015), Ae Dil Hai Mushkil (2016), and Sui Dhaaga (2018). Her highest-grossing releases came with the sports drama Sultan (2016), and Rajkumar Hirani's films PK (2014) and Sanju (2018). The poorly received Zero (2018) was followed by a hiatus from acting.

Sharma was the co-founder of the production company Clean Slate Filmz, under which she produced films and series such as NH10, Paatal Lok (2020) and Bulbbul (2020). She is the ambassador for brands and products, has designed her own line of clothing for women, named Nush, and supports charities and causes, including gender equality and animal rights. Sharma is married to cricketer Virat Kohli with whom she has two children.

== Early life and work ==
Sharma was born on 1 May 1988 in Ayodhya, Uttar Pradesh. Her father, Colonel Ajay Kumar Sharma, is a retired army officer, and her mother, Ashima Sharma, is a homemaker. Her father is a native of Uttar Pradesh, while her mother is a Garhwali. Her elder brother is film producer Karnesh Sharma, who earlier served in the Merchant Navy.

Sharma has stated that being a military brat played an important role in shaping her as a person and contributing to her life. In an interview with The Times of India in 2012, she said, "I take pride in saying that I am an army officer's daughter even more than being an actor."

Sharma was raised in Bangalore. But she did her primary schooling at St. Mary's School, Margherita, Assam. Sakshi Dhoni, the wife of M.S. Dhoni, was her classmate in that school. She completed her schooling at Army School, Bangalore. She then did her graduation in arts from Mount Carmel College, Bangalore.

Sharma originally intended to pursue a career in modelling or journalism and had no aspirations to be an actress. After graduation, Sharma moved to Mumbai to further her modelling career. She enrolled herself at the Elite Model Management, and was groomed by the style consultant Prasad Bidapa. In 2007, Sharma made her runway debut at the Lakme Fashion Week for designer Wendell Rodricks's Les Vamps Show and was picked to be his finale model at the Spring Summer 2007 Collection. Since then she has done campaigns for the brands Silk & Shine, Whisper, Nathella Jewelry and Fiat Palio. Sharma later said, "I think I was born to emote and act. I would walk down the ramp and smile and they used to say, 'give us a blank look.' It was really difficult, not to smile". Whilst modelling, Sharma also joined an acting school and began auditioning for film roles.

== Career ==
=== Breakthrough (2008–2013) ===
Sharma made her acting debut in Aditya Chopra's romantic drama Rab Ne Bana Di Jodi (2008), opposite Shah Rukh Khan. She took a day to prepare for her screen test at the Yash Raj Films studio and refused to do an impromptu one. She was signed for a three-film deal with the company and landed the leading role of Tani Sahni, a young bride to a middle-aged man, portrayed by Khan. Khalid Mohamed of Hindustan Times found her to be "assured and upright" in the film, but Nikhat Kazmi thought that she "lacks all chutzpah and can barely hold your attention". The film was a major commercial success, emerging as the second-highest grossing Hindi film of that year, and earned Sharma Filmfare Award nominations for Best Actress and Best Female Debut. Two years later, Sharma played the leading lady in the crime-comedy Badmaash Company, directed by Parmeet Sethi and co-starring Shahid Kapoor, Vir Das and Meiyang Chang. The film, which tells the story of four underachieving friends who begin a scam business enterprise, received mixed reviews, but was a moderate success.

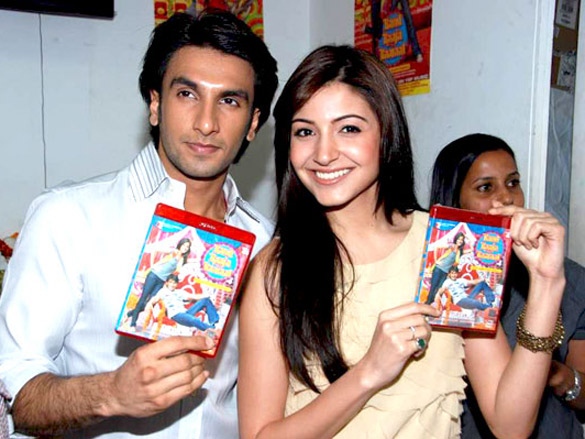
Sharma with co-star Ranveer Singh at the DVD launch of Band Baaja Baaraat in 2010

Later in 2010, Sharma completed her three-film contract with Yash Raj Films by starring in Band Baaja Baaraat, a romantic comedy directed by Maneesh Sharma and co-starring debutant Ranveer Singh. Her role was that of Shruti Kakkar, an ambitious middle-class Punjabi girl who starts her own wedding planning business. In preparation for the part, Sharma learned to speak in the Punjabi dialect, which she cited as the toughest part of her role; she described the way the lead characters in the film interact as "crude but cute" and it required her to "talk fast, sometimes mix words and even omit words completely". Trade analysts expressed doubt on Band Baaja Baaraat's financial prospect, citing the middling response to Yash Raj Films' last few productions, the lack of a male star, and saying that by then Sharma was an "almost-forgotten" actress. However, Band Baaja Baaraat earned positive reviews and emerged as a sleeper hit. Sharma's performance was praised by critics, many of whom cited it as her best work to that point. The critic Anupama Chopra wrote that Sharma "comes into her own as the ambitious Delhi girl, who dreams of upgrading to multi-crore Sainik Farms weddings". For her work in the film, Sharma received her second nomination for the Filmfare Award for Best Actress.

Sharma's first venture not to be produced by Yash Raj Films was the drama Patiala House (2011) directed by Nikkhil Advani and co-starring Akshay Kumar. The film tells the story of a budding cricketer (played by Kumar) who encounters trouble in convincing his father of his profession; Sharma was cast as the love interest of Kumar's character. Sukanya Verma of Rediff.com praised Sharma's work and labelled her a "metaphor for energy". That same year, she re-united with co-star Ranveer Singh and director Maneesh Sharma for the comedy-drama Ladies vs Ricky Bahl. She featured as Ishika Desai, a salesgirl hired to outwit a conman (essayed by Singh), who ends up falling in love with him instead. The film and Sharma's performance received mixed reviews, with Piyali Dasgupta of NDTV calling her "believable but not endearing". Despite mixed reviews, the film was a moderate success at the box office.

In 2012, Sharma played a supporting role alongside Shah Rukh Khan and Katrina Kaif in Yash Chopra's "swan song", the romance Jab Tak Hai Jaan, which marked her fifth collaboration with Yash Raj Films and her second with Khan. She was cast as Akira Rai, a Discovery Channel reporter who harbours ambitions of being a documentary filmmaker. Rajeev Masand wrote that Sharma "brings a spark to the film", but Raja Sen disagreed and said that "while Anushka can indeed play spunky, she needed here to tone it down several notches". For her role, she won the Filmfare Award for Best Supporting Actress. Jab Tak Hai Jaan proved to be the third highest-grossing Bollywood film of 2012.

Sharma next appeared in Vishal Bhardwaj's Matru Ki Bijlee Ka Mandola (2013), a political satire set in a village in Haryana. Co-starring alongside Pankaj Kapur, Imran Khan and Shabana Azmi, Sharma played the titular role of Bijlee Mandola, a strong-headed girl who engages in a romantic affair with Khan's character despite being engaged to another man. The film received positive to mixed reviews from critics, and underperformed at the box office. Several critics noted that Sharma was being stereotyped as a loud and loquacious girl; Raja Sen noted that she "is great in a couple of scenes near the climax," though Kanika Sikka of Daily News and Analysis was more critical and found her "unconvincing".

=== Success and expansion into film production (2014–2016) ===
In 2014, Sharma played a television journalist who befriends an alien (played by Aamir Khan), in Rajkumar Hirani's religious satire PK. Critic Saibal Chatterjee wrote that Sharma plays "a feisty poetry-loving girl who knows her mind far more than most Hindi film heroines are allowed to" and praised her for "hold[ing] her own" against Khan. Critically acclaimed, PK emerged as the highest-grossing Bollywood film with a worldwide revenue of over ₹7 billion (US$73 million). Sharma received various accolades for her performance including a nomination for IIFA Award for Best Actress. Sharma also became the highest grossing Hindi film actress of the year, as reported by Bollywood Hungama. Sharma launched a production company named Clean Slate Filmz in 2013, whose first release was Navdeep Singh's thriller NH10 (2015), in which she also played the lead role. Screened at the 5th Beijing International Film Festival, it tells the story of a married couple whose lives are endangered after an encounter with a group of criminals. In preparation, Sharma underwent interval training for three months to build her stamina. Saibal Chatterjee found the film to be a "taut and riveting thriller" and praised Sharma for "conveying a range of moods as she moves from the vulnerable to the fearless in a battle in which the odds are stacked heavily against her", and Prarthana Sarkar of International Business Times credited her for breaking away from her romantic comedy image. The film also emerged as a box office success.

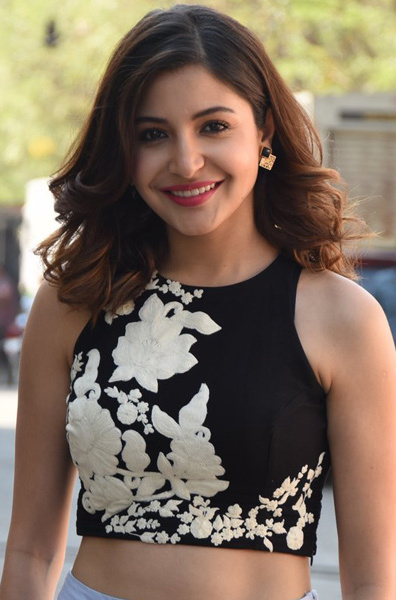
Sharma at an event for NH10 in 2015, which marked her production debut

In Anurag Kashyap's period crime drama Bombay Velvet (2015), (based on the historian Gyan Prakash's book Mumbai Fables) co-starring Ranbir Kapoor and Karan Johar, Sharma was cast as a jazz singer, Rosie Noronha. Her character was referenced from the actresses Brigitte Bardot, Helen and Waheeda Rehman. To prepare, Sharma watched films of the 1950s and 1960s, and documentaries about hair and make-up. She also used temporary lip enhancers for the part, citing it as the reason behind her changed appearance on a chat show in 2014, and refuted media speculation about having undergone plastic surgery. Bombay Velvet was screened at the Locarno and Bucheon film festivals; critical opinion was mixed. Writing for Business Standard, Ritika Bhatia praised Sharma's performance in the song "Dhadaam Dhadaam": "she fills the stage with such raw emotion that her mascara-laden tears and fake eyelashes flutter with arresting passion". However, the film failed to recoup its ₹1.2 billion (US$12 million) investment. In the same year, Sharma featured in the supporting role of a dancer aboard a cruise ship in Zoya Akhtar's Dil Dhadakne Do, an ensemble comedy-drama in which she was featured opposite Ranveer Singh. The song sequence "Pehli Baar" was choreographed by her and Singh; Shilpa Jamkhandikar of Reuters praised their on-screen chemistry and described it as "crackling". Her performances in NH10 and Dil Dhadakne Do earned Sharma Filmfare Award nominations for Best Actress and Best Supporting Actress, respectively.

Sharma next reunited with Yash Raj Films in Sultan (2016), a romantic sports drama from the writer-director Ali Abbas Zafar. She took on the role of Aarfa Hussain, a wrestler from Haryana who inspires the title character (played by Salman Khan) to take up the sport. Sharma was initially hesitant to play the part as she did not have the physique of a wrestler; she researched on different weight categories to "beat people's perception that all wrestlers are huge." She trained for six weeks in the sport, learned to speak the Haryanvi dialect, and interacted with female wrestlers from the state. The film and her performance received mixed reviews. Critics were appreciative of her substantial role in an androcentric film; Filmfare's Rachit Gupta described Sharma as "the best thing in the film" and noted that "[e]ven though she doesn't have the physique of a wrestler, her spirited performance makes you believe in her tough but emotional character." However, Suprateek Chatterjee of The Huffington Post felt that she was unconvincing as a wrestler, writing that "she possesses literally zero muscles and somehow always finds the time to get her make-up just right." With earnings of over ₹5 billion (US$52 million) worldwide, Sultan ranks among Indian cinema's biggest grossers.

Sharma achieved further success later that year when she played the lead female role of Alizeh Khan, a free-spirited girl in a loveless relationship in Karan Johar's romantic drama Ae Dil Hai Mushkil, alongside Ranbir Kapoor and Aishwarya Rai. Mike Maccahil of The Guardian took note of how much Sharma "terrific spikiness" and her chemistry with Kapoor helped a mediocre picture. In another typical mixed review, Sweta Kaushal of Hindustan Times praised Sharma's empowered female lead. Sukanya Verma ranked her performance number four in Rediff's list of top ten performances of the year. The film earned over ₹2 billion (US$21 million) worldwide, and Sharma received a Best Actress nomination at the 62nd Filmfare Awards. With two top-grossing films in 2016, Bollywood Hungama ranked Sharma as the most successful Bollywood actress of the year.

=== Career fluctuations, production focus and hiatus (2017–2022) ===
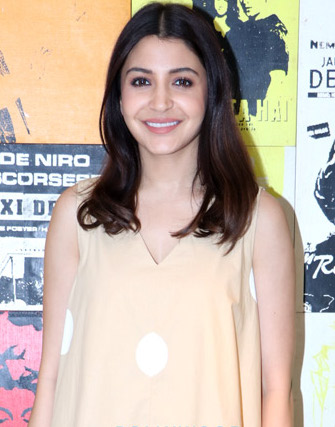
Sharma promoting Jab Harry Met Sejal in 2017

The 2017 fantasy comedy Phillauri, co-starring Suraj Sharma and Diljit Dosanjh, featured Sharma as a friendly ghost who wants to reunite with her lover. In addition to acting and producing, Sharma also sang a song in it. She next collaborated with Shah Rukh Khan for the third time in Imtiaz Ali's Jab Harry Met Sejal, a romance about a Gujrati tourist (Sharma) in Europe who falls in love with her tour guide (Khan). Commenting on Sharma's performances in Phillauri and Jab Harry Met Sejal, Uday Bhatia of Mint praised her ability for "straight-faced com[edy]". Bhatia, however, criticised her pairing with Khan, 22 years her senior, in the latter film. Unlike her 2016 releases, both these films were box office flops.

Sharma's first film release of 2018 was the horror film Pari, which she starred in and produced. It tells the story of Rukhsana (Sharma), a battered young woman living in the wilderness, who is rescued by a benevolent man (played by Parambrata Chatterjee). Though Shubhra Gupta of The Indian Express found the film "scatter-brained" and added that "nothing can rescue it, not even a leading lady who is determined to do something different with her producing heft", Sukanya Verma featured her performance in Rediff.com's annual list of best actresses, writing, "going from unhinged to ghastly to mesmeric, here's an actress who's game for everything." It earned ₹400 million (US$4.2 million) worldwide against a production budget of ₹180 million (US$1.9 million). Sharma next played a biographer documenting the life of the troubled actor Sanjay Dutt in Rajkumar Hirani's biopic Sanju, starring Ranbir Kapoor in the title role. Rajeev Masand commended the film's ensemble but was critical of Sharma's performance, writing that she "sticks out with strange hair and stranger accent". Even so, it emerged as her third release to earn over ₹5 billion (US$52 million) worldwide.

In the same year, Sharma teamed with Yash Raj Films for the eighth time in Sui Dhaaga, a comedy-drama co-starring Varun Dhawan, about a poor, young couple who begin their own small-scale clothing industry. Ronak Kotecha of The Times of India praised the subtle chemistry between the leads and credited Sharma for playing the restrained role effortlessly. She received a nomination for the Filmfare Critics Award for Best Actress. It emerged a box office success. Sharma's final film appearance of the year was in Zero, a drama about a dwarf's romantic tribulations involving two women, which reunited her with Shah Rukh Khan and Katrina Kaif. She played a NASA scientist with cerebral palsy, for which she met with an occupational therapist and an audiologist; she also stayed in character and chose to use a wheelchair between shots. Anupama Chopra considered her portrayal of the condition to be "inconsistent and clumsy" but Namrata Joshi of The Hindu found her "earnest and invested". As with her previous collaboration with Khan, Zero was a commercial failure.

In 2020, Sharma served as executive producer for her company's crime thriller series Paatal Lok, which was released on Amazon Prime Video, and produced the horror film Bulbbul for Netflix. Anna M. M. Vetticad found recurring themes of "feminism and the paranormal" in several of her company's projects, and credited Sharma for her "courageous, non-conformist" choices as a producer. In 2022, Sharma announced that she would step away from her producing duties for her banner Clean Slate Filmz, and that her brother would be the sole owner of the company. Following this, Sharma appeared as an actress in her co-production Qala. Deepa Gahlot took note of her "lovely" cameo appearance. In the same year, Sharma had filmed the part of cricketer Jhulan Goswami in the biopic Chakda 'Xpress, but as of 2024, it has not been picked up for distribution.

== Personal life ==
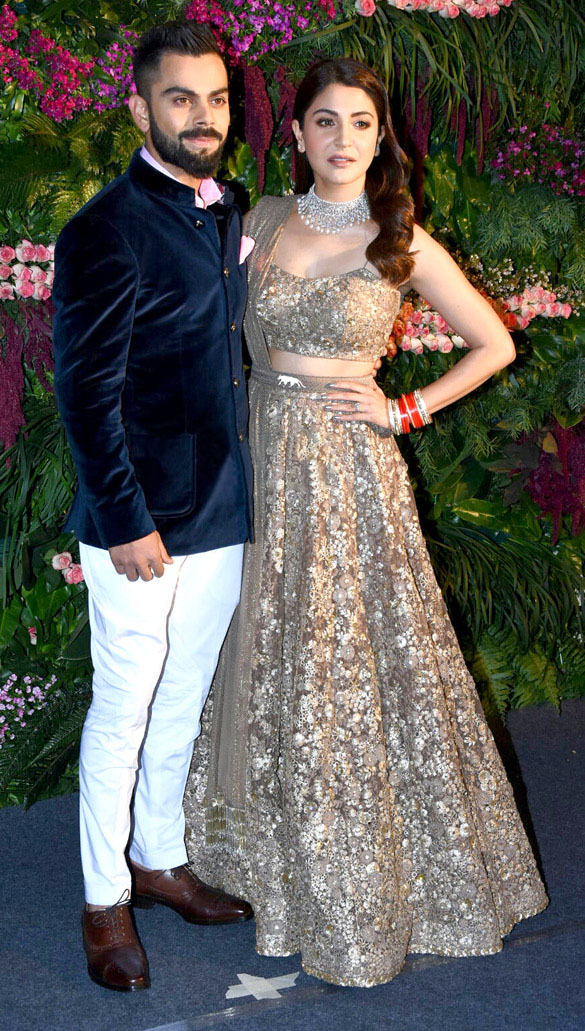
Sharma with her husband Virat Kohli, pictured in 2017

Sharma started practicing vegetarianism in 2015. The Times of India has listed her as one of "Bollywood's hottest vegetarian celebrities". She has also been named as "The Person of the Year" by the People for the Ethical Treatment of Animals (PETA) on multiple occasions. She is an avid practitioner of Transcendental Meditation. Sharma has undergone treatment for anxiety disorder.

A practicing Hindu, Sharma, along with her family, is a follower of Anant Dham Atmabodh Ashram in Haridwar. The ashram is headed by Maharaj Anant Baba, who is her family's spiritual guru and the actress is a regular visitor to the ashram. Sharma's romantic relationship with the cricketer Virat Kohli has attracted substantial media coverage in India, though she has been reluctant to publicly talk about it. The couple married in Italy on 11 December 2017. Sharma gave birth to a girl, Vamika, on 11 January 2021, followed by a boy, Akaay, on 15 February 2024.

On 14 June 2022, Anushka Sharma publicly criticized the Times Group for sharing a photo of her daughter taken on vacation without her permission. Anushka is extremely private about her personal life and has repeatedly requested the media and paparazzi to not share pictures of her daughter. In 2023, Sharma and Virat Kohli announced their new philanthropic venture "SEVVA", with their daughter as a partner.

== Off-screen work ==
In September 2013, Sharma participated and walked the ramp in a fashion show that was held in memory of the late filmmaker, Yash Chopra. She participated in the opening ceremony of the 2015 Indian Premier League held at Kolkata, along with other celebrities including Hrithik Roshan, Shahid Kapoor, Saif Ali Khan, Farhan Akhtar and composer Pritam.

Apart from acting, Sharma supports a number of charities and causes. She walked the ramp to support Shabana Azmi's Mijwan Welfare Society, a Non-governmental organization that helps empower women. In 2013, alongside other Bollywood actors, she pledged to support the education of India's young girls as part of NDTV's "Our Girls, Our Pride" fundraiser. That same year, she appeared alongside other celebrities in a commercial, produced by the National Film Development Corporation of India, to create awareness about the 'Right to Education' for children. In December 2014, Sharma auctioned the leather jacket she wore in Jab Tak Hai Jaan on eBay, with proceeds going to the redevelopment of the flood-ravaged states of Kashmir and Assam. Sharma had also fronted a campaign to collect donations for the victims of the April 2015 Nepal earthquake. She supports the annual Mumbai Film Festival, and donated money in its cause in 2015. Sharma has been vocal about the disparity in the pay that actresses command, in comparison with their male counterparts in the film industry. In 2016, she supported India's first transgender band, the 6-Pack Band (initiated by Y-Films), by providing a voice over in their first single, "Hum Hain Happy."

Sharma has also spoken up for animal rights on social media. In April 2014, she took to Twitter to ask for a ban on horse-drawn carriages in Mumbai. In June 2015, she condemned the Yulin Dog Meat Festival in China, and urged her fans to sign an online petition aimed at stopping it. In October 2015, she launched 'Pawsitivity', a campaign aimed at sensitising people about the adverse effects of noise, air, water and soil pollution on animals. In October 2017, Sharma launched her own clothing line, named Nush. Anushka was fined through rider for bike ride without helmet on Mumbai roads.

== Artistry and public image ==
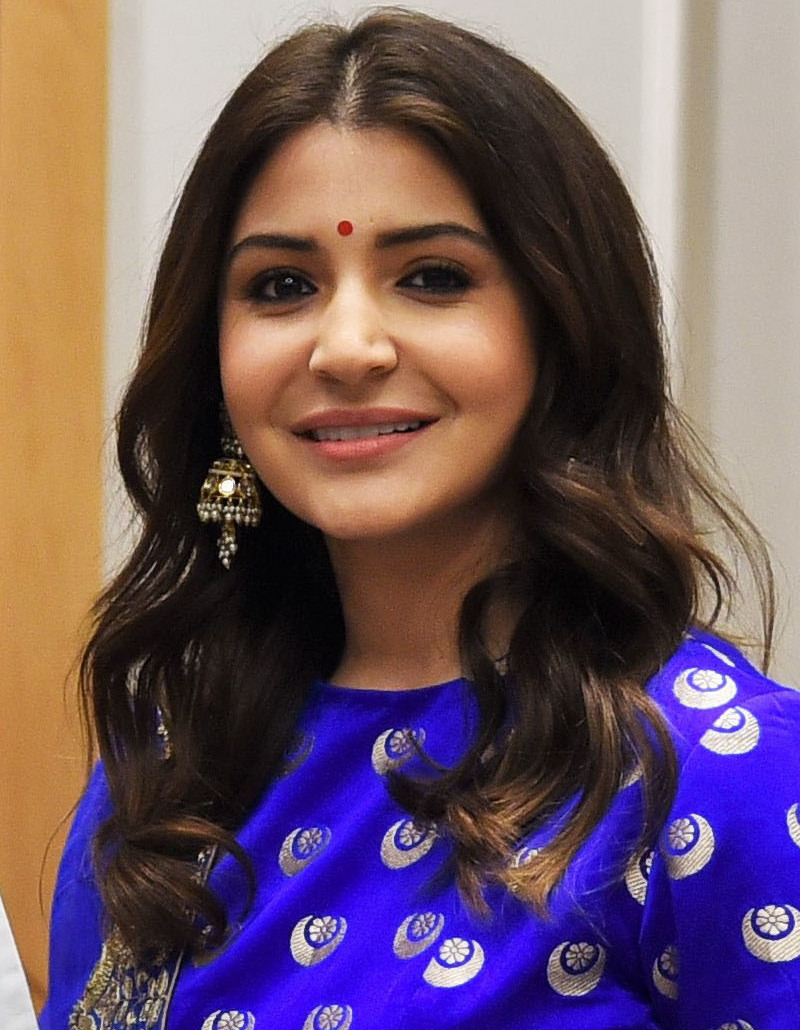
Sharma at the Prime Minister's Office in 2017

Priya Gupta of The Times of India has said that "the best part of [Sharma's] stardom is that she does not have the trappings of a star." Kalpana Nair of Firstpost stated: "actresses like Sharma command the respect they do in a largely conservative and male-dominated industry and the fact that their fan base grows when they take on roles that are not conventional is good reason for us to beam widely and walk with a spring in our step". Samar Srivastava, writing for Forbes, called her "unafraid", and added: "you would be hard-pressed to associate Sharma with the stereotype of a mainstream leading lady." Sandipan Dalal of Femina praises Sharma for her "amazing resolve and clarity". The Times of India published that "..she never shies away from putting [her opinion] across."

Sharma has been considered among the most popular and highest paid actresses in India, as of 2024. The actress' roles and performances have been studied by critics. She has been credited for her portrayals of strong and independent women. Writing for Filmfare, Devesh Sharma noted, "Sharma wants more author-backed material to come her way. She has always pushed the envelope, right from her initial days." Filmfare further stated, "Anushka has portrayed that women can be confident, self-reliant, ambitious and free-spirited to take their own life decisions." Subhash K. Jha of Rediff.com termed her a "natural-born scene stealer". GQ termed her "feisty and fearless" and wrote, "She's been lauded for her powerhouse performances as an actor, and as a producer, she's constantly seeking to push mainstream boundaries."

Sharma featured on Rediff.com's "Bollywood's Best Actors" list for Band Baaja Baaraat (2010), NH10 (2015) and Pari (2018). Sharma was also featured on their list of "Bollywood's Best Dressed Actresses" in 2012–13. She was also placed in Times of India's "50 Beautiful Faces" list. Since 2012, she has appeared in Forbes India's Celebrity 100, a list based on the income and popularity of Indian celebrities. In 2018, she peaked at the 16th position with an estimated annual earning of ₹45.83 crore (US$4.8 million), making her the third highest-paid actress and female celebrity in the country. Sharma appeared in the Forbes Asia's 30 Under 30 list of 2018. In Times 50 Most Desirable Women list, she was placed 21st in 2010, 5th in 2011 and 26th in 2012 and 2013. Times Celebex named her the "Box Office Queen" in 2014.

Sharma maintains a Twitter and Instagram account and has an official Facebook page. She is cited as one of the most popular Indian celebrities on social media. In 2015, she appeared on The Huffington Post's list of "100 most influential women on Twitter". The same year, she also topped the Times Celebex list of Bollywood stars, in terms of highest box-office collection. In 2016, she featured on The Times of India's 'Most Engaging on Twitter' list of Hindi film actors. Filmfare magazine's fashion poll of 2015 voted her as being "Amazing with Androgyny" and said that "...[she] has carved a niche for her easy breezy high street style." She also featured on Verve magazine's "Best Dressed 2015" list. In 2018 and 2019, she featured in Fortune India's "50 Most Powerful Women in Business". Sharma is a celebrity endorser for various brands and products, including TVS Scooty, Nivea, Bru coffee, Elle 18 cosmetics and Pantene. In 2022, she was named among the most searched Asian on Google. In 2024, Sharma was placed 22nd on IMDb's List of 100 Most Viewed Indian Stars.

== Filmography ==
Key
†	Denotes films that have not yet been released

=== Films ===
Year	Title	Role	Notes	Ref.
2008	Rab Ne Bana Di Jodi	Taani Sahni	Debuted with Shah Rukh Khan	
2010	Badmaash Company	Bulbul Singh		
2010	Band Baaja Baaraat	Shruti Kakkar		
2011	Patiala House	Simran Chaggal	Collaborated with Akshay Kumar	
2011	Ladies vs Ricky Bahl	Ishika Desai		
2012	Jab Tak Hai Jaan	Akira Rai		
2013	Matru Ki Bijlee Ka Mandola	Bijlee Mandola		
2014	PK	Jagat Janini "Jaggu" Sahni		
2015	NH10	Meera	Also producer	
2015	Bombay Velvet	Rosie Noronha		
2015	Dil Dhadakne Do	Farah Ali		
2016	Sultan	Aarfa Hussain		
2016	Ae Dil Hai Mushkil	Alizeh Khan		
2017	Phillauri	Shashi Kumari	Also producer and playback singer for song "Naughty Billo"	
2017	Jab Harry Met Sejal	Sejal Zaveri		
2018	Pari	Rukhsana	Also producer	
2018	Sanju	Winnie Diaz		
2018	Sui Dhaaga	Mamta Sharma		
2018	Zero	Aafia Yusufzai Bhinder		
2020	Bulbbul	—N/a	Producer only	
2022	Qala	Devika	Cameo appearance	
TBA	Chakda 'Xpress †	Jhulan Goswami	Unreleased	

=== Television ===
Year	Title	Role	Notes	Ref.
2020	Paatal Lok	—N/a	Producer (season one)	
2023	The Romantics	Herself	Documentary series	

=== Music video ===
Year	Title	Performers	Ref.
2020	"Kudi Nu Nachne De"	Vishal Dadlani, Sachin–Jigar	
2022	"Har Ghar Tiranga"	Asha Bhosle, Sonu Nigam, Devi Sri Prasad	

== Accolades ==
Sharma received eight Filmfare Awards nominations—Best Female Debut for Rab Ne Bana Di Jodi (2008), Best Actress for Rab Ne Bana Di Jodi, Band Baaja Baaraat (2010), NH10 (2015) and Ae Dil Hai Mushkil (2016), Best Actress Critics for Sui Dhaaga (2018), and Best Supporting Actress for Jab Tak Hai Jaan (2012) and Dil Dhadakne Do (2015). Sharma has won one among them, Best Supporting Actress for Jab Tak Hai Jaan.
