= Wedding planner =

Profession

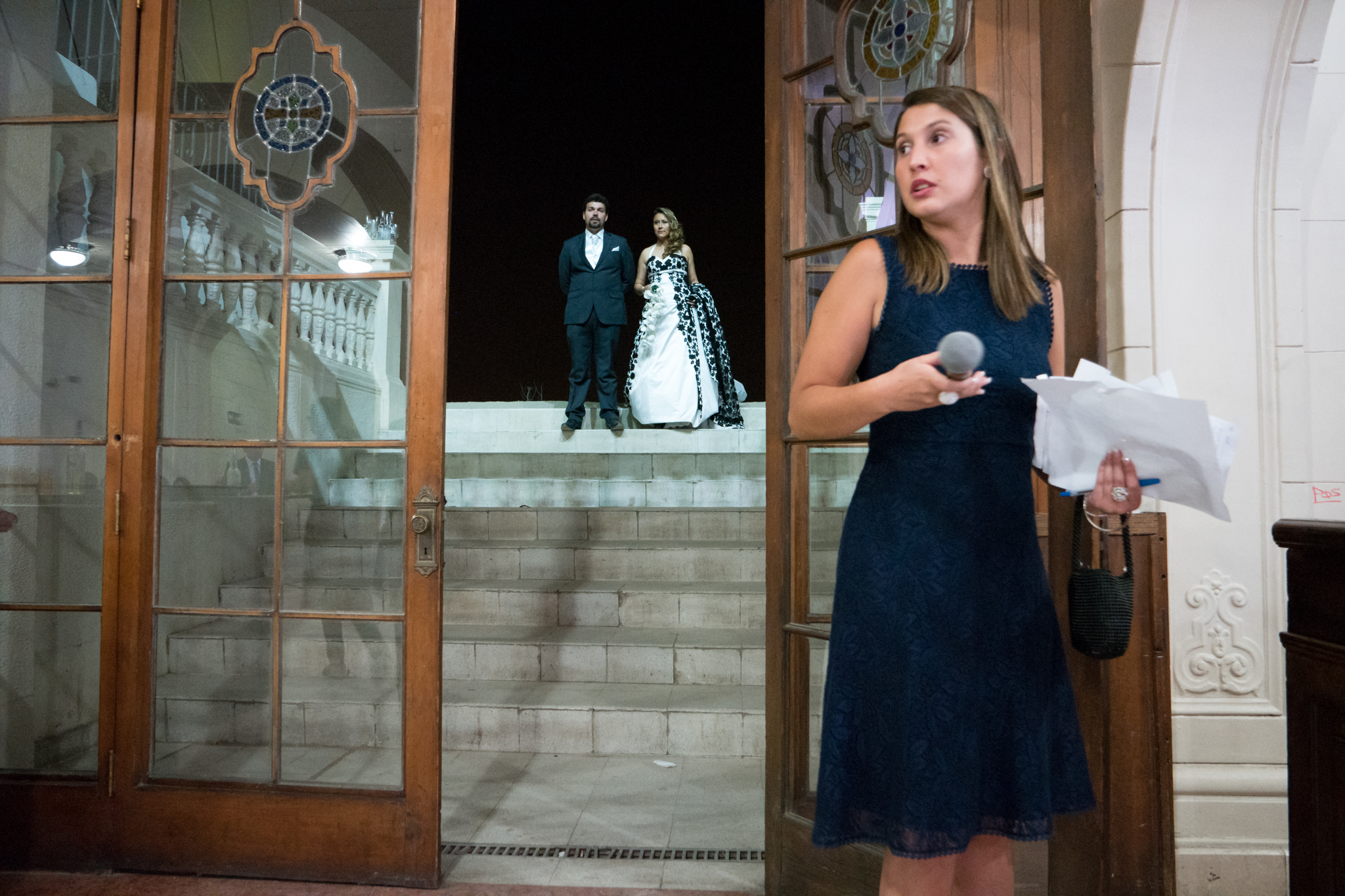
A planner at a Chilean wedding event

A wedding planner is an event planner who assists with the design, planning, and management of a client's wedding. Other names include wedding consultant, wedding designer, wedding coordinator, and wedding director.

Professional wedding planners are based worldwide but the industry is the largest in the US, India, western Europe and China. Before the introduction of professional wedding planners, which became a recognized job in the 1990s, most of the work usually fell to the bride's mother or sister.

Planners are also popular with couples planning a destination wedding, where the documentation and paperwork can be complicated. Any country where a wedding is held requires different procedures depending on the nationality of each the bride and the groom.

== Clients ==
Weddings are significant events in people's lives and as such, couples are often willing to spend considerable amount of money to ensure that their weddings are well-organized. Wedding planners are often used by couples who work long hours and have little spare time available for sourcing and managing wedding venues and wedding suppliers. In particular, the increased number of women who are working full-time and have disposable income but who are time-poor, has driven the increased use of paid wedding planners. The desire for weddings to be extravagant spectacles has also increased interest in hiring wedding planners.

== Services ==
Most planners offer one or more packages of services, either comprehensive, a partial package, or "day-of" services only. Additionally, many wedding planners can be hired for specific, individual tasks. Generally, a comprehensive package covers full-scale event planning, beginning with determining the goals and budget. The comprehensive package may include organizing and attending tours of venues (hotels, restaurants, party house, church, temple, or other location for the ceremony etc.) and interviews with potential vendors (suppliers, photographers, videographers, beauticians, florists, sweets, buffet, drinks, etc.), working with the client to develop an overall design for the event, negotiating contracts and organizing payments, backup plans for emergencies, and more. They will organize additional events, such as photo shoots and or a day-after brunch for out-of-town guests, that the clients want. In this wide-ranging role, the planner may go beyond the ordinary role of a service provider and event organizer and make decisions about artistic aspects or provide personal support as a mediator or friendly confidante.

A partial package is a scaled-down version of the comprehensive package, offering selected services. For example, a partial package might arrange decorators, musicians, caterers, and photographers, but would not help with invitations, venue selection, clothing, or travel plans. They will generally include logistical planning services (such as contacting all vendors the week before to confirm their arrival time and needs, as well as creating a timeline including each activity), planning the event layout (e.g., where the wedding cake will be displayed, where the DJ or band will be, where guests will be able to sit, where food will be served) and day-of services.

Day-of services require work before the actual day of the event, so the planner knows what needs to be done on the day of the event. Day-of servings including coordinating of deliveries and services at the events, answering questions from vendors, and solving unexpected problems.

One of the most common individual services is hiring a planner to send invitations and track responses. Wedding planners are also hired to organize individual wedding-related events, such as an engagement party, a bridal shower, or the honeymoon.

Some services will depend upon specific needs for a particular wedding. For example, a wedding planner may help prepare legal documentation and translations, especially for destination weddings. For instance, US citizens marrying in Italy require a Nulla Osta (affidavit sworn in front of the US consulate in Italy), plus an Atto Notorio (sworn in front of the Italian consulate in the US or at a court in Italy), and legalization of the above. Some countries instead have agreements and the couple can get their No Impediment forms from their local registrar and have it translated by the consulate in the country of the wedding. A local wedding planner can take care of the different procedures.

== Payments ==
The fees depend upon the services provided. Planners generally charge either a percentage of the total wedding cost, or a flat fee. Wedding planners can charge an hourly wage, depending on which part of the country they conduct their services in. The rate also depends on how much experience the wedding planner has had.

== Training ==
Various wedding planning courses are available to those who wish to pursue the career.

== In popular culture ==
The 2001 comedy The Wedding Planner with Jennifer Lopez and Matthew McConaughey is about the busy life of a wedding planner who falls in love with one of her clients.

The 2010 Bollywood film Band Baaja Baaraat is about marriage planners falling in love. Ranveer Singh made his debut with this film and won Best Debutant at several awards. The film had a successful run at the theaters.

The 2011 Hong Kong television drama Only You tells the stories of a fictional wedding services agency and their clients.

== See also ==
- Event planning
- Marriage proposal planner
