= Badmaash Company =

2010 Indian film by Parmeet Sethi

- Theatrical release poster
- Directed by: Parmeet Sethi
- Written by: Parmeet Sethi
- Produced by: Aditya Chopra
- Starring: Shahid Kapoor; Anushka Sharma; Vir Das; Meiyang Chang; Anupam Kher
- Cinematography: Sanjay Kapoor
- Edited by: Ritesh Soni
- Music by: Songs: Pritam; Score: Julius Packiam
- Production company: Yash Raj Films
- Distributed by: Yash Raj Films
- Release date: 7 May 2010
- Running time: 130 minutes
- Country: India
- Language: Hindi
- Budget: ₹210 million
- Box office: ₹530 million

Badmaash Company (transl. Naughty Company) is a 2010 Indian Hindi-language crime comedy film written and directed by Parmeet Sethi (in his directorial debut) and produced by Aditya Chopra under Yash Raj Films. The film stars Shahid Kapoor, Anushka Sharma, Vir Das and Meiyang Chang. The film was released on 7 May 2010, and was a commercial success at the box office.

== Plot ==
In 1994, middle-class Bombay, three ordinary youngsters, Karan, Zing, and Chandu, graduate from college and go for a trip to Bangkok, Thailand, where they meet Bulbul and they start a business together.

Karan falls in love with Bulbul and tells her that he always wanted to start his own business, but his father Sajjan Kapoor wants him to do an MBA first. On the other hand, Bulbul confesses that she wants to be a supermodel and advises Karan that he does not need a large amount of money to start a business but a big "idea."

Back in India, Sajjan has a heart attack. Karan's mother, Maya, pawns her jewelry in order to arrange money for better medical facilities and an AC room at the hospital, as his insurance could only afford a small room with a fan. This leaves Karan heartbroken, and he immediately decides to get rich by any means. He starts his own business venture along with his friends. He comes up with an idea for smuggling branded Reebok shoes into India without any customs charges. For this, they have to separate the consignment into two halves, one half with only left shoes in Calcutta and the other half with only right shoes in Madras. At both places, the buyer will refuse to receive the consignment; hence, the entire consignment will be confiscated. The confiscated consignment will then be auctioned to which Chandu (in Calcutta) and Karan (in Madras) will buy the entire consignment, posing as scrap dealers. Once they pair the right pair of shoes with the left pair of shoes, the zero-valued product comes into full value, which they sell at any price without any customs charges. They name their venture "Friends and Company" and proceed to make a large fortune with it.

When Karan is caught red-handed by Sajjan while putting away the black money, he explains the situation, including the fact that he is doing business with a smuggler. As a result, he is forced to leave the house and starts living with Bulbul and uses her to get contacts and contracts. After the government in India decides to reduce the import duty on foreign goods (including shoes), the friends decide to go to America. They get help from Karan's Uncle Jazz and do the same business in the US as they did in India; however, this time they import leather gloves. Soon, the group becomes excessively rich and starts to live a lavish life. Zing meets Linda, and they begin a relationship, but Zing’s alcoholism causes the relationship to deteriorate, and Chandu secretly falls in love with Linda. Meanwhile, the police start to suspect Karan and his team, owing to which they change their business. They decide to rent a lavish house for $100,000 by taking a loan from a bank. Afterwards, they sell the house to each other, taking a loan from the same bank, repeating the cycle. Once one of the friends cannot replay the loan, they declare themselves bankrupt, and the property gets seized by the bank. However, the company would have already gained $200,000 in profit. As time goes on, Karan becomes too greedy, and the group falls apart.

Zing and Chandu get into an argument because Zing abuses Linda. Karan and Zing get into an argument about Zing's excessive drinking. Zing leaves and opens his own bar. Bulbul leaves when she finds out that Karan has married another woman in a contract marriage for his Green Card. Chandu marries Linda and quits the company to start a clean video store business alongside her. Alone and heartbroken, Karan visits India and secretly attends a function where Sajjan is being honored for his years of service to his company. Upon seeing this, he realizes his mistake and returns to America, where he is arrested and jailed for six months. He is bailed out by Bulbul, Zing, and Chandu. Bulbul gives up Zing's, Chandu's, and her share of profits from what they earned in the company.

Karan starts working with his uncle Jazz. One day, Karan coincidentally meets Bulbul, who is revealed to be pregnant with his child, and they both reconcile. At Uncle Jazz's office, Karan finds out that his uncle's entire consignment of imported shirts from Madras has been rejected due to the color of the shirt changing after being washed, causing Jazz company's share to fall down to 30%. Karan sees an opportunity and comes up with another idea and patches up with Zing, Chandu, and his family to start another venture.

Zing also apologizes to Chandu and says that he is happy that Linda is safe with Chandu. As for Karan, this time he makes Jazz's buyers believe that his company offers a new kind of shirt in the market, which changes its color every time it's washed, hence somebody gets a new shirt every time it's washed. The buyers order a trial order of 5,000 pieces. Linda, who is one of Michael Jackson’s backstage dancers, promotes the shirt that he wears in one of his concerts.

Karan’s new shirt design becomes a hit. It brings in sales. Jazz’s struggling business starts to improve. As the company grows, Karan, his friends and Jazz decide to turn Friends and Company into a company. Karan sees his hard work pay off. He sees his father smile with pride. That makes Karan feel truly accomplished.

== Cast ==
- Shahid Kapoor as Karan Kapoor
- Anushka Sharma as Bulbul Singh
- Vir Das as Chandu
- Meiyang Chang as Zing
- Anupam Kher as Sajjan Kapoor, Karan's father
- Kiran Juneja as Maya Kapoor: Karan's mother
- Shalini Chandran as Anu Kapoor: Karan's sister
- Pavan Malhotra as Jazz: Karan's maternal uncle
- Jameel Khan as Archie Bhai
- Alexandra Vino as Linda
- John Marenjo as Charlie
- Obaid Kadwani as the Lawyer

== Production ==
Parmeet Sethi wrote the script within six days. The four main characters are all based on real-life people. Sethi revealed that he was tired of television and was keen on pursuing film direction. Filming locations for the film included New York, Atlantic City, Philadelphia, Bangkok, Mumbai, and Hyderabad.

== Critical reception ==
The film received mixed-to-positive reviews from critics. Taran Adarsh of Bollywood Hungama gave it a rating of 3 out of 5, saying; "On the whole, Badmaash Company is a watchable experience for various reasons, the prime reason being it offers solid entertainment, but doesn't insult your intelligence." Rajeev Masand of CNN-IBN gave the movie 1.5 out of 5 and claimed it to be "outrageously silly". Gaurav Malani of Indiatimes gave the film 3.5 out of 5 saying "Badmaash Company is a good entertainer. Worth a watch!" and praising Shahid Kapoor. Komal Nahta gave the film 2.5 out of 5, praising the performance of Kapoor and called Badmaash Company "an entertainer". Sukanya Verma of rediff gave the film 2 out of 5 stars saying Sethi's directorial debut starts out with cocksure confidence and zing.

Nikhat Kazmi of the Times of India gave the film 3 out of 5 stars and said, "Indeed, Badmaash Company does have a bunch of riveting scenes, although the story does follow a very predictable line of crime and punishment/repentance." DNA gave the film 2.5 out of 5 saying, "This company is worth keeping." Anupama Chopra of NDTV called it a "staggeringly tedious film" while Raja Sen of Rediff said, "There's not a single scene in the film that actually works". Mayank Shekhar of the Hindustan Times criticized the film as half-written; he only liked the film until the interval and gave it 2 out of 5. The film received an aggregate rating of 4/10 at ReviewGang.

== Box office ==
The film had a decent opening on its first weekend despite competition from the multi-starrer comedy Housefull. The film made a drop in overseas collections, but it have much effect on its domestic collections. By the end of its first week, the film grossed ₹ 208.4 million. The film collected ₹ 529.8 million at the end of its theatrical run and became a commercial success at the box office.

== Awards ==
| Award | Date of the ceremony | Category | Recipients | Result | Ref. |
|---|---|---|---|---|---|
| Zee Cine Awards | 14 January 2011 | Most Promising Director | Parmeet Sethi | Nominated | |
| Zee Cine Awards | 14 January 2011 | Best Male Debut | Meiyang Chang | Nominated | |
| Zee Cine Awards | 14 January 2011 | Best Male Debut | Vir Das | Nominated | |
| Stardust Awards | 6 February 2011 | Breakthrough Performance – Male | Meiyang Chang | Nominated | |

== Soundtrack ==
Badmaash Company

Soundtrack album by Pritam Chakraborty
- Released: 7 May 2010
- Genre: Film soundtrack
- Length: 30:43
- Label: YRF Music

Pritam Chakraborty chronology
| Atithi Tum Kab Jaoge? (2010) | Badmaash Company (2010) | Action Replayy (2010) |
External audio
- Audio Jukebox on YouTube

The songs featured in the film are composed by Pritam Chakraborty with the lyrics penned by Anvita Dutt Guptan, while the film score was composed by Julius Packiam.

| No. | Title | Artist(s) | Length |
|---|---|---|---|
| 1. | "Ayaashi" | KK | 04:24 |
| 2. | "Jingle Jingle" | Mohit Chauhan, Master Saleem, Monali Thakur | 04:27 |
| 3. | "Chaska" | Krishna Beura | 05:14 |
| 4. | "Fakeera" | Rahat Fateh Ali Khan | 04:38 |
| 5. | "Badmaash Company" | Benny Dayal, Anushka Manchanda | 03:58 |
| 6. | "Ayaashi" (Remix) | KK | 04:12 |
| 7. | "Chaska" (Remix) | Krishna Beura | 03:49 |
