= Sui Dhaaga =

2018 Indian film by Sharat Katariya

Sui Dhaaga: Made In India
- Theatrical release poster
- Directed by: Sharat Katariya
- Written by: Sharat Katariya
- Produced by: Maneesh Sharma
- Starring: Anushka Sharma; Varun Dhawan
- Cinematography: Anil Mehta
- Edited by: Charu Shree Roy
- Music by: Songs: Anu Malik; Background Score: Andrea Guerra
- Production company: Yash Raj Films
- Distributed by: Yash Raj Films
- Release date: 28 September 2018
- Running time: 122 minutes
- Country: India
- Language: Hindi
- Budget: ₹48 crore
- Box office: ₹125.09 crore

Sui Dhaaga: Made in India (transl. Needle & Thread; Hindi pronunciation: [sʊiː d̪ʱaːgaː]) is a 2018 Indian Hindi-language comedy-drama film directed by Sharat Katariya and produced by Aditya Chopra and Maneesh Sharma. The film stars Varun Dhawan and Anushka Sharma as a married couple in small-town India who begin their own small-scale clothing business. It was shot in Chanderi, Bhopal, Delhi and Ghaziabad. The film was released in India on 28 September 2018; it received mixed to positive reviews from critics and proved to be a commercial success at the box office, It received five nominations at the 64th Filmfare Awards including Best Actress (Critics) for Sharma and Best Supporting Actress for Yamini Dass, who played Dhawan's mother in the film.

The film found a place as an official entry, in the competition category at the Shanghai International Film Festival (SIFF), the Belt and Road Film, which began on 15 June 2019.

== Plot ==
Mauji Sharma is a small-town man who lives with his parents and wife Mamta. His late grandfather used to work as a tailor in the neighbourhood handicraft business. The trade eventually shut down, leaving Mauji's family on the verge of bankruptcy. His father Parasram now works as a government employee and is about to retire. Mauji is an errand boy in a shop that sells sewing machines, where he is constantly ridiculed and demeaned for the amusement of his boss. He secretly bemoans the fact that his interactions with Mamta are very limited owing to the lack of space, and her being perpetually busy with household duties. In spite of all this, he is a good-natured and optimistic person. He is also a skilled tailor and often does small mending jobs on a sewing machine borrowed from his neighbour and friend Yogesh.

While attending the wedding of one of Mauji's employers, Mamta witnesses the kind of treatment her husband receives at work, which leaves her visibly upset. She urges him to revive the family trade, insisting that self-respect is more important than money. Mauji brushes this suggestion off, aware of the risks associated with it. Even so, her words play on his mind and he ends up quitting his job after reaching his breaking point with his boss, much to Parasram's disapproval.

After Mauji's mother suffers from a heart attack, the family is thrown into deep waters as with Parasram now retired, they cannot afford the treatment. Mauji's younger brother Jugnu, who lives separately with his wife and son in the same locality, informs him of a clerical job in Meerut. Mauji declines it, and with his wife's support, sets up a roadside tailoring shop in the town market area. He stitches a hospital gown for his mother, which Mamta embroiders. The garment attracts the attention of other patients who also demand one, prompting the two to devise a new moneymaking scheme. Jealous of Mauji's success, Yogesh takes his sewing machine back. The couple journey across the state border to successfully obtain a sewing machine distributed to the underprivileged by the Government.

Mauji's activities in the hospital come to the notice of the authorities. Jugnu's brother-in-law Guddu, who is friendly with the staff, asks him and Mamta to manufacture the hospital gowns under the label of the clothing company he works at. He also offers them both jobs at the factory. After much deliberation, the two take the job, knowing that they are in dire need of the money. The owner of the company, Harleen Bedi, is a cunning woman who takes advantage of their gullible nature, resulting in them handing over the rights to their clothing and embroidery designs. Mauji becomes increasingly discontent at having been duped and picks a fight with Guddu. He is thrashed and thrown out of the factory; Mamta quietly follows suit.

Utterly humiliated, the couple decides to enter themselves into the annual Raymond Fashion Fund competition for upcoming designers, which Harleen is also participating in. They name their company Sui Dhaaga: Made in India. After their initial designs are shortlisted by the jury, they approach all the former artisans in the neighbourhood to help them out and participate in the final fashion show. Eventually, Parasram also comes around and lends a hand. On the day of the fashion show, their clothes are highly appreciated by everyone for their originality. Shortly before the results are announced, two of the judges let slip that while any other designer in their place would have easily won, their lack of experience worked against them. Crestfallen, the team makes their way back to catch the bus home. Meanwhile, the judges re-evaluate their decision and declare Team Sui Dhaaga as the winners. Everyone is called back and as they all walk the ramp again, Mauji and Mamta are elated at having their dreams finally come true.

As the end credits roll, it is shown that the family is free from their financial struggles, Sui Dhaaga's designs are being marketed all over the world, and Mauji and Mamta have opened up a tailoring school to encourage others like them to become self-reliant.

== Cast ==
- Anushka Sharma as Mamta Sharma, Mauji's wife
- Varun Dhawan as Mauji Sharma, Mamta's husband
- Raghubir Yadav as Parasram Sharma, Mauji's father
- Yamini Das as Nimmo Sharma, Mauji's mother
- Sawan Tank as Jugnu Sharma, Mauji's brother
- Manukriti Pahwa as Kumud Sharma, Jugnu's wife
- Namit Das as Guddu Singh, Kumud's brother
- Pooja Sarup as Harleen Bedi
- Mahesh Sharma as Yogesh Kumar
- Shrikant Verma as Shankar Palte Ram, Mauji's family friend
- Sidharth Bhardwaj as Mr. Bansal, Mauji's former boss
- Ashish Verma as Prashant Bansal, Mr. Bansal's son
- Bhupesh Singh as Naushad Khan
- Latha Nayak as Malayali Nurse
- Anirban Bhattacharyya as Ranvir Tandon, Judge in Sewing Machine Competition
- Jeetendra Shastri as a Cobbler
- Sikander Malik as Examiner
- Abha Parmar as Mrs. Kushum Devi, Yogesh's mother
- Brijesh Karanwal as Bijender Yadav, Mauji's friend and a rickshaw driver
- Lokesh Mittal as Vivek Pandit, Nimmo's hospital owner
- Ridith Chouske as Beenu Sharma, Jugnu & Kumud's son

== Production ==
=== Development ===
The project was announced in July 2017. After initial talks with Ranbir Kapoor fell through, Dhawan was approached for the lead role, with Anushka Sharma playing the female lead. The duo posted riddles related to the theme of the film on their social media handles, and confirmed it soon after that. Sharat Katariya, who had earlier made the romantic comedy Dum Laga Ke Haisha (2015), wrote the script of Sui Dhaaga in 3 weeks and was roped in to direct the film, with Maneesh Sharma producing it under the Yash Raj Films banner. Anushka Sharma and Maneesh Sharma had previously worked on Band Baaja Baaraat (2010) and Ladies vs Ricky Bahl (2011).

According to sources, the film was based on the Make in India campaign launched by the Indian government in 2014, which was aimed at promoting the country's indigenous textile industries. Maneesh Sharma called it "[..] a heartwarming story of pride and self-reliance." He further added, "This story finds its roots in the heart of India and reflects the passion that runs through the veins of every single Indian."

It was initially speculated that Dhawan would play the role of a labourer in the film. Later it was reported that he would play a tailor, and Anushka Sharma an embroiderer. Dhawan described his character to be both a tailor and a peon, and stated that it had been inspired by the Tinkle comic character Suppandi. Both the actors learnt how to sew and embroider, and also operate the sewing machine.

=== Filming ===
Principal photography began in the town of Chanderi, Madhya Pradesh in February 2018. The actors bought traditional Chanderi sarees from local weavers in the town, praising the hard work that went into making them. Dhawan concurred a head injury whilst filming a fight sequence, but resumed work the very same day. The actors also shot for a continuous ten-hour cycling sequence in the streets of Chanderi. The first schedule wrapped up in March 2018.

Filming continued in the same month in Bhopal, and moved on to Delhi and Ghaziabad, Uttar Pradesh. The second schedule was completed in April 2018.

The final schedule of the film begun in June 2018. The shooting of the film was wrapped in July 2018.

== Marketing ==
Prior to beginning filming, a short clip paying tribute to Mahatma Gandhi, and featuring Anushka Sharma and Varun Dhawan was released on the occasion of his 150th birth anniversary. A still which depicted the lead pair as a small town couple was released shortly after filming had begun. During a Twitter interaction with fans, Dhawan announced that the trailer will be released in August 2018. On 13 August, Yash Raj Films released the trailer of the film on YouTube. Varun Dhawan and Anushka Sharma were seen promoting their movie in a new promotional activity called Sui Dhaaga Challenge, where the actors areinating colleagues to take up the challenge and share videos of themselves threading a needle on social media.

== Soundtrack ==
Sui Dhaaga

Soundtrack album by Anu Malik
- Released: 21 September 2018
- Recorded: 2018
- Genre: Feature film soundtrack
- Length: 25:59
- Language: Hindi
- Label: YRF Music

Anu Malik chronology
Batti Gul Meter Chalu (2018)	Sui Dhaaga (2018)
External audio
- Official Audio Jukebox on YouTube

The songs of the film are composed by Anu Malik while lyrics are written by Varun Grover. The first song of the film, Chaav Laaga which is sung by Papon and Ronkini Gupta was released on 27 August 2018. The second song of the film titled as Khatar Patar which is sung by Papon was released on 8 September 2018. The third song to be released was Sab Badhiya Hai which is sung by Sukhwinder Singh was released on 21 September 2018. The album of the film was released on 21 September 2018 by YRF Music.

Track listing
No.	Title	Singer(s)	Length
1.	"Sab Badhiya Hai"	Sukhwinder Singh	3:56
2.	"Chaav Laaga"	Papon, Ronkini Gupta	5:48
3.	"Khatar Patar"	Papon	5:35
4.	"Tu Hi Aham"	Ronkini Gupta	5:15
5.	"Sui Dhaaga"	Divya Kumar	5:25
Total length:			25:59

== Release and reception ==
The film was released in India on 28 September 2018 by YRF. The film was released in Taiwan on 3 January 2020, and set to release in China on 31 March 2023.

=== Critical reception ===
On the review aggregator website Rotten Tomatoes, 91% of 11 critics' reviews are positive, with an average rating of 6.1/10.

Sukanya Verma of Rediff.com rated 4/5 stars and felt that "Varun Dhawan and Anushka Sharma portray the world of Sui Dhaaga with a gentleness that turns everything it touches into gold."

Anupama Chopra, in her review for Film Companion rated the film 3/5 and said that "Anushka Sharma, grappling with an under-written character, is solid. And they are supported by Raghubir Yadav, brilliant as the father who weeps while watching daily soaps and Yamini Dass, who steals the show as Mauji's mother."

== Box office ==
The film made a good occupancy on its opening day. It collected ₹8.30 crore, which is a good response. After a reasonably good start on Friday, Sui Dhaaga showed good growth on Saturday as ₹12.25 crore came in. On Sunday, the film collected ₹16.05 crore. Prior to its Taiwan release, the film grossed ₹125.09 crore worldwide.

== Awards ==
Awards	Category	Recipients and nominees	Results
Filmfare Awards	Best Actress (Critics)	Anushka Sharma	Nominated
Filmfare Awards	Best Supporting Actress	Yamini Dass	Nominated
Filmfare Awards	Best Female Playback Singer	Ronkini Gupta for "Chaav Laga"	Nominated
Filmfare Awards	Best Story	Sharat Katariya	Nominated
Filmfare Awards	Best Dialogue	Sharat Katariya	Nominated
Zee Cine Awards	Best Actor – Male (Viewers' Choice)	Varun Dhawan	Nominated
Zee Cine Awards	Best Actor – Female (Viewers' Choice)	Anushka Sharma	Nominated
Screen Awards	Best Playback Singer - Female	Ronkini Gupta for "Chaav Laga"	Nominated
Indian Film Festival of Melbourne	Best Film	Sui Dhaaga	Nominated
