= Stardust Award for Best Actress in a Comedy or Romance =

Film award in India

The Stardust Best Comedy/Romance Actress is chosen by the readers of the annual Stardust magazine. The award honours a star that has made an impact with their acting in that certain film.

Here is a list of the award winners and the films for which they won.

Year	Actress	Film
2011	Katrina Kaif	Tees Maar Khan
2012	Anushka Sharma	Ladies vs Ricky Bahl
2013	Anushka Sharma	Jab Tak Hai Jaan
2014	no award	no award
2015	Sonam Kapoor	Khoobsurat

== See also ==
- Stardust Awards
- Bollywood
- Cinema of India
