= Marriage proposal planner =

Event Coordinator

A marriage proposal planner is a professional event coordinator who specializes in planning marriage proposals. Proposal planners suggest marriage proposal ideas, scout proposal locations, negotiate rates with vendors, hire photographers, create romantic setups, acquire permits, and help clients choose engagement rings. Proposal planners may first interview the proposer and ask questions about the couple, and then use the answers to create a unique proposal idea.

Proposal planners have emerged in the twenty-first century, and may be a result of increased public nature of proposals due to social media use.
