= Times Celebex: Bollywood Stars' Rating =

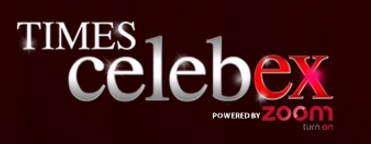
Times Celebex: Bollywood Stars' Rating

TIMES Celebex is the official rating of the Bollywood Stars in India and Worldwide. Based on various parameters T Score is calculated and the Bollywood actors and actresses ranked. The score and the ranking is a representation of the good influence and power of these stars over the audience.

== T Score ==
TIMES Celebex powered by Zoom calculates the ‘T Score’ based on the star's popularity, performance and visibility by measuring various parameters ranging from Box Office performance to PR buzz to Online following and more. Following are the key determinants of the T Score

- Box Office Returns and Recognition
- Ability to stay in the news across print and TV
- Visibility through Brand Endorsements on Print and TV
- Promotions of their upcoming movie releases on Print and TV
- Popularity among fans across mediums including the Internet and Social Media

TIMES Celebex is the most robust and factual ratings index for Bollywood celebrities as it is based on comprehensive data and hard facts rather than the subjective perception of a jury alone. Data is sourced from credible external agencies that service the media industry and collated from 60+ publications, 250+ TV channels, 10000+ cinema halls and millions of users across the Internet. Calculated month-on-month, TIMES Celebex is a dynamic index and hence a very current measure of a Celebrity's power as opposed to any other one-time annual report.

== Superlatives ==
Categories		
Most Top Spot	Actor	Salman Khan - 21
Most Top Spot	Actress Deepika padukone - 11	
Most consecutive Top spot	Actor	Salman Khan - 7 months (December 2012 - June 2013)
Most consecutive Top spot	Actress	Kareena kapoor - 7 months (January 2013 - July 2013 )
Most Top 5 without ever claiming Top spot	Actor	Saif Ali Khan - 8 times
Most Top 5 without ever claiming Top spot	Actress	Aishwarya Rai Bachchan - 7 times
Highest T-score	Actor	Salman Khan - 89.0 (T-Score) (December 2012)
Highest T-score	Actress	Kareena Kapoor - 73.0 (T-Score) (September 2012)
Lowest T-score with Top spot	Actor	Salman Khan - 15.0 (T-Score) (February 2016)
Lowest T-score with Top spot	Actress	Priyanka Chopra - 15.0 (T-Score) (March 2016)

== Annual Compendium ==
		First	Second	Third	Fourth	Fifth
2012*	Actor					
2012*	Actress					
2013						

== TIMES Celebex Ranking ==
=== 2012 ===
==== List of Top 5 ranked Actors for 2017 ====
Month	First	T Score	Second	T Score	Third	T Score	Fourth	T Score	Fifth	T Score
September	Akshay Kumar	70.0	Shahrukh Khan	52.0	Akshay Kumar	50.0	Ranbir Kapoor	48.0	Amitabh Bachchan	32.5
October	Salman Khan	58.0	Shahrukh Khan	49.0	Akshay Kumar	35.4	Amitabh Bachchan	33.0	Saif Ali Khan	30.5
November	Shahrukh Khan	73.0	Salman Khan	53.9	Ajay Devgan	38.0	Akshay Kumar	36.4	Amitabh Bachchan	35.0
December	Salman Khan	89.0	Akshay Kumar	48.0	Shahrukh Khan	42.0	Aamir Khan	39.0	Saif Ali Khan	33.0

==== List of Top 5 ranked Actresses for 2012 ====
Month	First	T Score	Second	T Score	Third	T Score	Fourth	T Score	Fifth	T Score
September	Kareena Kapoor	73.0	Katrina Kaif	60.0	Priyanka Chopra	53.0	Bipasha Basu	35.5	Aishwarya Rai	30
October	Kareena Kapoor	47.5	Katrina Kaif	45.0	Priyanka Chopra	37.0	Anushka Sharma	26	Aishwarya Rai	25
November	Katrina Kaif	67.0	Sonakshi Sinha	45.0	Kareena Kapoor	44.5	Anushka Sharma	42	Priyanka Chopra	30
December	Kareena Kapoor	54.5	Katrina Kaif	44.0	Sonakshi Sinha	35.0	Priyanka Chopra	31	Deepika Padukone	30

==== Summary 2012 ====
2012	First	Second	Third	Fourth	Fifth
Actor	Salman Khan	Shah Rukh Khan		Amitabh Bachchan	Aamir Khan
T Score	270.9	216	169.8	126.5	120.5
T Score	Salman khan Dominated the year : 2012 by 3 top spot	Shah Rukh Khan claimed top spot in November 2012	Akshay Kumar stands Third in 2012; Best : 2nd spot in December 2012	Amitabh bachchan stands Fourth in 2012; Best : 4th spot in October 2012	Aamir khan stands fifth in 2012; Best : 4th spot in December 2012
Actress	Kareena Kapoor	Katrina Kaif	Priyanka Chopra	Sonakshi Sinha	Anushka Sharma
T Score	219.5	216	151	124.3	110
T Score	Kareena Kapoor Dominated the year : 2012 by 3 top spot	Katrina Kaif claimed top spot in November 2012	Priyanka Chopra stands Third in 2012; Best : 3rd spot in September & October 2012	Sonakshi sinha stands Fourth in 2012; Best : 2nd spot in November 2012	Anushka Sharma stands Fifth in 2012; Best : 4th spot in October & November 2012

=== 2013 ===
==== List of Top 5 ranked Actors for 2013 ====
Month	First	T Score	Second	T Score	Third	T Score	Fourth	T Score	Fifth	T Score
January	Salman Khan	56.0	Shahrukh Khan	46.0	Saif Ali Khan	36.5	Akshay Kumar	35.0	Ranbir Kapoor	31.0
February	Salman Khan	50.0	Akshay Kumar	48.0	Shahrukh Khan	35.0	Amitabh Bachchan	28.0	Aamir Khan	22.0
March	Salman Khan	45.0	Shahrukh Khan	41.0	Amitabh Bachchan	30.0	Akshay Kumar	29.0	Ajay Devgn	27.3
April	Salman Khan	51.0	Shahrukh Khan	50.0	Amitabh Bachchan	33.0	Aamir Khan	30.0	Akshay Kumar	26.0
May	Salman Khan	50.0	Shahrukh Khan	45.0	Ranbir Kapoor	43.0	Amitabh Bachchan	31.5	Aamir Khan	31.0
June	Salman Khan	51.5	Ranbir Kapoor	44.0	Shahrukh Khan	35.0	Amitabh Bachchan	29.0	Aamir Khan	27.0
July	Shahrukh Khan	37.3	Salman Khan	37.0	Farhan Akhtar	33.5	Amitabh Bachchan	29.0	Ranbir Kapoor	26.0
August	Shahrukh Khan	76.0	Salman Khan	42.0	Akshay Kumar	39.0	Amitabh Bachchan	33.0	John Abraham	28.5
September	Ranbir Kapoor	41.0	Salman Khan & Amitabh Bachchan	39.0	-		Riteish Deshmukh	36.5	Shahrukh Khan	35.0
October	Akshay Kumar	45.0	Ranbir Kapoor	44.0	Salman Khan	40.2	Hrithik Roshan	38.0	Shahrukh Khan	37.0
November	Hrithik Roshan	55.0	Ranveer Singh	36.5	Salman Khan	35.0	Shahrukh Khan	33.0	Saif Ali Khan	27.5
December	Aamir Khan	58.0	Salman Khan	42.0	Shahrukh Khan	37.0	Amitabh Bachchan	31.0	Shahid Kapoor	33.0

==== List of Top 5 ranked Actress for 2013 ====
Month	First	T Score	Second	T Score	Third	T Score	Fourth	T Score	Fifth	T Score
January	Katrina Kaif	46.0	Priyanka Chopra	44.0	Deepika Padukone	39.0	Kareena Kapoor	36.0	Anushka Sharma	33.0
February	Katrina Kaif	50.0	Kareena Kapoor	48.0	Priyanka Chopra	29.0	Deepika Padukone	23.0	Aishwarya Rai	20.5
March	Katrina Kaif	40.0	Priyanka Chopra	35.0	Kareena Kapoor	32.0	Bipasha Basu	25.0	Parineeti Chopra	21.0
April	Katrina Kaif	43.0	Kareena Kapoor	32.0	Priyanka Chopra	28.0	Deepika Padukone	26.0	Aishwarya Rai	19.5
May	Katrina Kaif	44.5	Kareena Kapoor	34.0	Deepika Padukone	33.3	Priyanka Chopra	33.0	Vidya Balan	22.5
June	Katrina Kaif	38.0	Deepika Padukone	34.3	Sonam Kapoor	34.0	Kareena Kapoor	33.0	Sonakshi Sinha	27.3
July	Katrina Kaif	33.0	Sonam Kapoor	32.6	Sonakshi Sinha	27.1	Kareena Kapoor	24.5	Priyanka Chopra	24.0
August	Deepika Padukone	61.0	Katrina Kaif	31.0	Kareena Kapoor	30.5	Sonakshi Sinha	29.0	Priyanka Chopra	27.0
September	Kareena Kapoor	49.5	Katrina Kaif	34.0	Priyanka Chopra	31.0	Parineeti Chopra	29.0	Deepika Padukone	23.0
October	Katrina Kaif	38.0	Kareena Kapoor	37.5	Priyanka Chopra	36.0	Deepika Padukone	32.0	Aishwarya Rai	28.0
November	Priyanka Chopra	53.0	Deepika Padukone	48.0	Kareena Kapoor	43.5	Katrina Kaif	35.0	Kangana Ranaut	32.0
December	Katrina Kaif	59.0	Deepika Padukone	39.0	Sonakshi Sinha	36.0	Kareena Kapoor	35.5	Priyanka Chopra	29.8

==== Summary 2013 ====
2013	First	Second	Third	Fourth	Fifth
Actor	Salman Khan	Shah Rukh Khan		Ranbir Kapoor	Amitabh Bachchan
T Score	536.7	505.3	378	363.6	362.5
T Score	Salman khan Dominated the year : 2013 by 6 top spot	Shah Rukh Khan claimed top spot in July & August 2013	Akshay Kumar claimed top spot for first time in October 2013	Ranbir Kapoor claimed top spot for first time in September 2013	Amitabh bachchan stands Fifth in 2013; Best : 2nd spot in September 2013
Actress	Katrina Kaif	Kareena Kapoor	Deepika Padukone	Priyanka Chopra	Sonakshi Sinha
T Score	456.5	436	400.6	396.8	260
T Score	Katrina Kaif Dominated the year : 2013 by 9 top spot	Kareena Kapoor claimed top spot in September 2013	Deepika Padukone claimed top spot in August 2013	Priyanka Chopra claimed top spot in November 2013	Sonakshi Sinha stands Fifth in 2013; Best : 3rd spot in July & December 2013

===== Other Mention =====
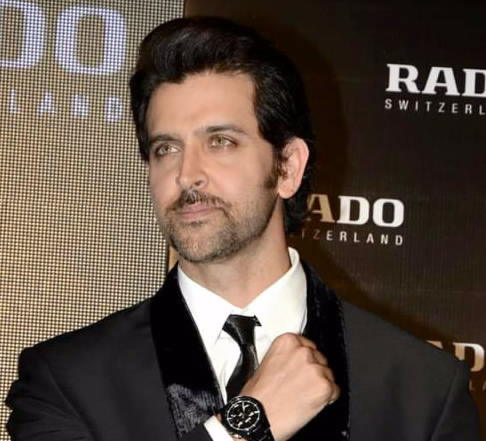
Hrithik Roshan topped the list for the first time in November 2013.

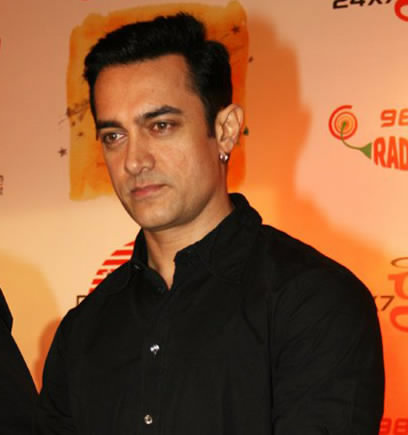
Aamir Khan also topped the list for first time in December 2013.

=== 2014 ===
==== List of Top 5 ranked Actors for 2014. ====
	First	T Score	Second	T Score	Third	T Score	Fourth	T Score	Fifth	T Score
January	Salman Khan	72.0	Amitabh Bachchan	42.0	Shahrukh Khan	36.0	Ranbir Kapoor	34.0	Aamir Khan	30.0
February	Salman Khan	48.0	Ranveer Singh	36.5	Arjun Kapoor	33.5	Shahrukh Khan	30.0	Ranbir Kapoor	26.0
March	Salman Khan	43.0	Amitabh Bachchan	35.0	Shahrukh Khan	32.0	Aamir Khan	28.0	Farhan Akhtar	24.5
April	Amitabh Bachchan	42.0	Arjun Kapoor	39.5	Salman Khan	39.0	Shahrukh Khan	34.0	Ranbir Kapoor	20.0
May	Salman Khan	40.0	Shahrukh Khan	37.0	Tiger Shroff	30.5	Akshay Kumar	26.0	Amitabh Bachchan	25.0
June	Akshay Kumar	46.2	Ritesh Deshmukh	45.0	Salman Khan	44.2	Saif Ali Khan	39.5	Shahrukh Khan	28.0
July	Salman Khan	77.0	Akshay Kumar	40.0	Varun Dhawan	36.5	Amitabh Bachchan	32.0	Shahrukh Khan	25.3
August	Ajay Devgan	48.5	Salman Khan	45.3	Akshay Kumar	45.0	Shahrukh Khan	39.0	Amitabh Bachchan	28.0
September	Salman Khan	37.3	Hrithik Roshan	37.0	Shahrukh Khan	34.0	Akshay Kumar	22.2	Fawad Khan	22.1
October	Shahrukh Khan	68.0	Hrithik Roshan	61.0	Abhishek Bachchan	44.5	Salman Khan	36.0	Akshay Kumar	35.3
November	Shahrukh Khan	39.0	Salman Khan	32.0	Amitabh Bachchan	29.0	Saif Ali Khan	26.5	Akshay Kumar	25.8
December	Aamir Khan	62.0	Salman Khan	39.0	Shahrukh Khan	38.0	Ajay Devgn	31.5	Amitabh Bachchan	29.0

==== List of Top 5 ranked Actress for 2014 ====
Month	First	T Score	Second	T Score	Third	T Score	Fourth	T Score	Fifth	T Score
January	Deepika Padukone	48.0	Madhuri Dixit	36.0	Kareena Kapoor	34.5	Katrina Kaif	33.0	Priyanka Chopra	32.0
February	Priyanka Chopra	46.0	Deepika Padukone	32.0	Alia Bhatt & Kareena Kapoor	30.5	-		Parineeti Chopra	28.5
March	Kangana Ranaut	41.5	Sunny Leone	41	Deepika Padukone	35.0	Katrina Kaif	34.0	Madhuri Dixit	32.0
April	Alia Bhatt	35.5	Deepika Padukone	39.0	Katrina Kaif	31.0	Nargis Fakhri	29.0	Kareena Kapoor	28.5
May	Deepika Padukone	41.0	Katrina Kaif	34.0	Priyanka Chopra	30.0	Kareena Kapoor	27.5	Aishwarya Rai	25.0
June	Sonakshi Sinha	42.0	Deepika Padukone	31.0	Kareena Kapoor	28.5	Shraddha Kapoor	27.5	Katrina Kaif	26.0
July	Alia Bhatt	41.5	Deepika Padukone	31.3	Kareena Kapoor	31.0	Katrina Kaif	29.0	Priyanka Chopra	27.0
August	Kareena Kapoor	51.0	Deepika Padukone	36.0	Priyanka Chopra	33.0	Rani Mukherjee	28.5	Katrina Kaif	27.0
September	Priyanka Chopra	46.0	Deepika Padukone	45.0	Katrina Kaif	33.3	Sonam Kapoor	33.0	Parineeti Chopra	30.0
October	Deepika Padukone	65.0	Katrina Kaif	60.0	Shraddha Kapoor	32.0	Kareena Kapoor	30.0	Priyanka Chopra	29.0
November	Deepika Padukone	37.0	Kareena Kapoor	32.2	Priyanka Chopra	28.2	Parineeti Chopra	28.0	Katrina Kaif	27.0
December	Anushka Sharma	49.5	Priyanka Chopra	42.0	Sonakshi Sinha	38.0	Deepika Padukone	36.0	Kareena Kapoor	32.5

==== Summary 2014 ====
2014	First	Second	Third	Fourth	Fifth
Actor	Salman Khan	Shah Rukh Khan	Amitabh Bachchan		
T Score	552.8	440.3	363.6	344.5	299.7
T Score	Salman khan Dominated the year : 2014 by 6 top spot	Shah Rukh Khan claimed top spot in October & November 2014	Amitabh bachchan claimed top spot for first time in April 2014	Akshay Kumar claimed top spot in June 2014	Hrithik Roshan stands fifth in 2014; Best : 2nd spot in September & October 2014
Actress	Deepika Padukone	Priyanka Chopra	Katrina Kaif	Kareena Kapoor	Alia Bhatt
T Score	476.3	389.2	381.3	378.2	292.5
T Score	Deepika Padukone Dominated the year : 2014 by 4 top spot	Priyanka Chopra claimed top spot in February & September 2014	Katrina Kaif stands Third in 2012; Best : 2nd spot in May & October 2014	Kareena Kapoor claimed top spot in August 2014	Alia Bhatt claimed top spot for first time in April 2014 & also topped in July 2014

===== Other mention =====
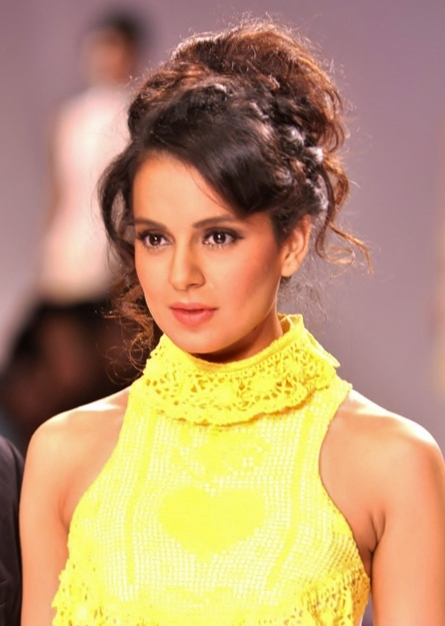
Kangana Ranaut topped the list in March 2014.

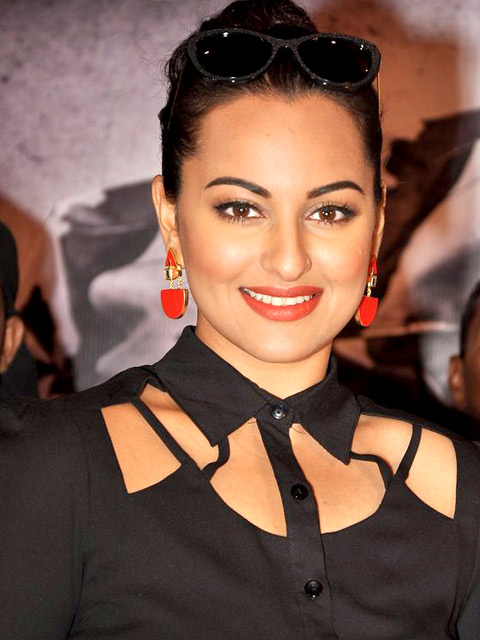
Sonakshi Sinha topped the list in June 2014.

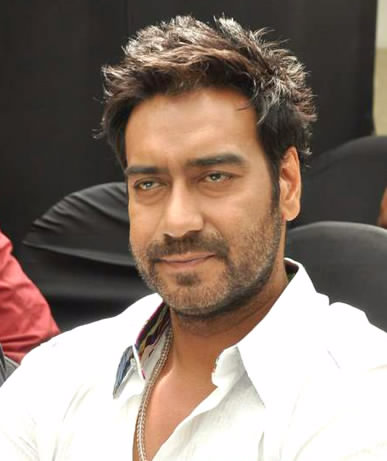
Ajay devgn claimed his top spot for August 2014.

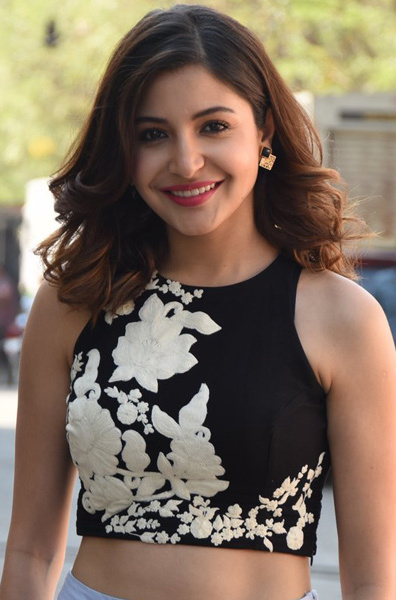
Anushka sharma topped the list in December 2014.

=== 2015 ===
==== List of Top 5 ranked Actors for 2015 ====
Month	First	T Score	Second	T Score	Third	T Score	Fourth	T Score	Fifth	T Score
January	Ranbir Kapoor	34.0	Shahrukh Khan	27.0	Amitabh Bachchan	26.0	Arjun Kapoor	25.0	Salman Khan	21.0
February	Amitabh Bachchan	36.0	Ranbir Kapoor	34.5	Shahrukh Khan	34.0	Varun Dhawan	33.5	Akshay Kumar	32.0
March	Shahrukh Khan	38.0	Salman Khan	37.0	Amitabh Bachchan	33.0	Akshay Kumar	28.0	Aamir Khan	27.0
April	Salman Khan	43.0	Shahrukh Khan	33.0	Akshay Kumar	32.2	Amitabh Bachchan	32.0	Ranbir Kapoor	23.0
May	Salman Khan	53.0	Amitabh Bachchan	45.0	Akshay Kumar	42.0	Ranbir Kapoor	36.0	R. Madhavan	31.5
June	Salman Khan	42.0	Varun Dhawan	38.5	Ranveer Singh	34.0	Shahrukh Khan	28.0	Farhan Akhtar	27.5
July	Salman Khan	41.0	Shahrukh Khan	18.0	Akshay Kumar	17.0	Ajay Devgan	15.5	Amitabh Bachchan	15.0
August	Salman Khan	49.0	Shahrukh Khan	35.0	Amitabh Bachchan	32.0	Saif Ali Khan	29.5	Akshay Kumar	29.0
September	Salman Khan	26.0	Shahrukh Khan	20.0	Ranbir Kapoor	19.0	Saif Ali Khan	18.7	Imran Khan	18.5
October	Shahrukh Khan	44.0	Akshay Kumar	34.0	Salman Khan	33.0	Irrfan Khan	32.5	Amitabh Bachchan	28.0
November	Shahrukh Khan	38.0	Salman Khan	37.0	Ranbir Kapoor	26.0	Shahid Kapoor	24.7	Akshay Kumar	24.0
December	Shahrukh Khan	42.0	Salman Khan	36.0	Ranveer Singh	30.0	Varun Dhawan	27.5	Amitabh Bachchan	23.0

==== List of Top 5 ranked Actress for 2015 ====
Month	First	T Score	Second	T Score	Third	T Score	Fourth	T Score	Fifth	T Score
January	Sonakshi Sinha	32.0	Anushka Sharma	24.5	Deepika Padukone	22.2	Kareena Kapoor	22.0	Priyanka Chopra	21.1
February	Jacqueline Fernandez	28.0	Kareena Kapoor	27.0	Alia Bhatt	25.5	Anushka Sharma	24.2	Deepika Padukone	24.0
March	Anushka Sharma	50.5	Deepika Padukone	35.0	Priyanka Chopra	28.0	Alia Bhatt	27.5	Sunny Leone	27.2
April	Deepika Padukone	34.0	Anushka Sharma	32.5	Sunny Leone	28.0	Priyanka Chopra	23.0	Alia Bhatt	22.7
May	Deepika Padukone	51.0	Kangana Ranaut	48.0	Anushka Sharma	45.0	Priyanka Chopra	35.0	Katrina Kaif	32.0
June	Shraddha Kapoor	46.0	Priyanka Chopra	40.5	Anushka Sharma	36.5	Kareena Kapoor	31.0	Deepika Padukone	29.0
July	Kareena Kapoor	30.0	Katrina Kaif	28.0	Priyanka Chopra	27.0	Anushka Sharma	25.0	Deepika Padukone	23.0
August	Kareena Kapoor	39.0	Katrina Kaif	30.5	Deepika Padukone	30.0	Priyanka Chopra	28.0	Shraddha Kapoor	25.0
September	Kareena Kapoor	22.5	Priyanka Chopra	22.0	Anushka Sharma	21.5	Katrina Kaif	20.0	Shraddha Kapoor	19.0
October	Deepika Padukone	34.0	Aishwarya Rai	30.0	Alia Bhatt	29.5	Priyanka Chopra	26.0	Katrina Kaif	25.0
November	Deepika Padukone	36.0	Sonam Kapoor	28.0	Priyanka Chopra	27.0	Yami Gautam	26.0	Shraddha Kapoor	24.0
December	Kajol	36.5	Priyanka Chopra	35.0	Deepika Padukone	34.0	Yami Gautam	22.0	Kareena Kapoor	18.5

==== Summary 2015 ====
2015	First sA lman	Second srk	Third akshay	Fourth amitabajay	Fifth ajay
Actor					
T Score					
Actress					
T Score					

=== 2016 ===
==== List of Top 5 ranked Actors for 2016 ====
Month	First	T Score	Second	T Score	Third	T Score	Fourth	T Score	Fifth	T Score
January	Akshay Kumar	27.0	Amitabh Bachchan	25.0	Shahrukh Khan	18.9	Salman Khan	18.0	Aamir Khan	17.0
February	Aamir Khan	15.0	Ajay Devgan	14.0	Salman Khan	13.0	Shahrukh Khan	12.5	Akshay Kumar	12.0
March	Fawad Khan	18.0	Shah Rukh Khan	15.5	Salman Khan	16. 8	Ranveer Singh	14.0	Sidharth Malhotra	13.9
April	Shah Rukh Khan	21.0	Salman Khan	19.0	Aamir Khan	17.5	Akshay Kumar	16.9	Amitabh Bachchan	16.0

==== List of Top 5 ranked Actress for 2016 ====
Month	First	T Score	Second	T Score	Third	T Score	Fourth	T Score	Fifth	T Score
January	Katrina Kaif	21.0	Priyanka Chopra	19.0	Kangana Ranaut	18.0	Anushka Sharma	17.9	Yami Gautam	17.0
February	Yami Gautam	23.0	Shraddha Kapoor	18.0	Priyanka Chopra	16.9	Katrina Kaif	16.0	Sonam Kapoor	15.0
March	Priyanka Chopra	15.0	Alia Bhatt	14.5	Shraddha Kapoor	13.9	Kangana Ranaut	13.5	Deepika Padukone	12.9
April	Shraddha Kapoor	16.0	Priyanka Chopra	15.0	Anushka Sharma	13.7	Sunny Leone	13.0	Kangana Ranaut	12.5

== Times Celebex Awards ==
=== 2014 Awards ===
- Superstar of the year (male) : Salman Khan
- Superstar of the year (female) : Deepika Padukone
- Best in Brand endorsement (male) : Shah Rukh Khan
- Best in Brand endorsement (female) : Katrina Kaif
- Most followed on social media (male) : Amitabh Bachchan
- Most followed on social media (female) : Deepika Padukone
- Best Debut (male) : Tiger Shroff
- Best Debut (female) : Kriti Sanon
- Most Searched online (male) : Salman Khan
- Most Searched online (female) : Sunny Leone
- Most Popular in Print media (male) : Salman Khan
- Most Popular in Print media (female) : Deepika Padukone
- Box Office King : Salman Khan
- Box Office Queen : Anushka Sharma

== See also ==
- Zoom
- Bollywood
- Cinema of India
