= Rab Ne Bana Di Jodi =

2008 Indian film by Aditya Chopra

- Theatrical release poster
- Directed by: Aditya Chopra
- Written by: Aditya Chopra
- Produced by: Yash Chopra; Aditya Chopra
- Starring: Shah Rukh Khan; Anushka Sharma; Vinay Pathak
- Cinematography: Ravi K. Chandran
- Edited by: Ritesh Soni
- Music by: Salim–Sulaiman
- Production company: Yash Raj Films
- Distributed by: Yash Raj Films
- Release date: 12 December 2008
- Running time: 164 minutes
- Country: India
- Language: Hindi
- Budget: ₹310 million
- Box office: est. ₹1.57 billion

Rab Ne Bana Di Jodi (transl. 'A match made by god'), also known by its initialism as RNBDJ, is a 2008 Indian Hindi-language romantic comedy film written and directed by Aditya Chopra and produced by his father Yash Chopra under their production banner of Yash Raj Films. It marked Aditya Chopra's return to direction after an eight-year hiatus following Mohabbatein. The film stars Shah Rukh Khan as Surinder Sahni, a mild-mannered office employee who marries his deceased professor's daughter, Taani, portrayed by Anushka Sharma in her debut. His friend, played by Vinay Pathak, eventually transforms him into the fun-loving "Raj Kapoor" to win Taani's love. The film's music was composed by Salim–Sulaiman.

Rab Ne Bana Di Jodi was released worldwide on 12 December 2008 and received positive reviews from critics. It performed strongly at the box-office, grossing over ₹157 crore (US$17 million) to become the highest-grossing Hindi film of the year overseas, and highest-grossing film of Khan's career at the time. The film received limited pre-release promotion due to the concerns regarding cinema attendance following the 2008 Mumbai attacks.

At the 54th Filmfare Awards, Rab Ne Bana Di Jodi received a leading 10 nominations, including Best Film, Best Director (Aditya), Best Actor (Khan), Best Actress (Sharma) and Best Supporting Actor (Pathak), and won 2 awards – Best Male Playback Singer (Sukhwinder Singh for "Haule Haule") and Best Scene of the Year.

The film's script was recognized by a number of critics and was invited to be included in the Margaret Herrick Library of the Academy of Motion Picture Arts and Sciences, just a day after its release. The script is accessible for research purposes only; students, filmmakers, writers, and actors are among the regular patrons.

== Plot ==
Shy and introverted Surinder “Suri” Sahni, an employee of Punjab Power, falls in love with Taani Gupta, the daughter of his former professor, during preparations for her wedding. When Taani’s fiancé dies in a traffic accident, her father suffers a fatal heart attack and asks Suri to marry her so she will not be alone. After Taani's father dies, Suri and Taani get married and move into Suri's ancestral home. Later on, Suri's office colleagues and his best friend Bobby invite themselves to his house for a party after learning of his marriage despite Suri trying to cover it up. Suri feels awkward as he cannot make a depressed Taani meet them, but is later surprised when she shows up. Taani explains she can never love him.

While living in Amritsar, Suri treats Taani with kindness but is unable to express his feelings. Seeking excitement in her otherwise unhappy life, Taani joins a dance class. Feeling inadequate compared with the confident men she admires, Suri adopts the flamboyant alter ego “Raj,” with the help of his friend Bobby. Disguised, he enrolls in the same dance class and becomes Taani’s partner in a dance competition. Unaware of Raj’s true identity, Taani gradually grows close to him.

Raj eventually confesses his love for Taani, placing her in a dilemma between her growing feelings for him and her sense of duty toward Suri. Although she briefly considers eloping with Raj, a visit to the Golden Temple leads her to reflect on Suri’s devotion and believe their marriage is divinely ordained. She decides not to run away.

At the dance competition, as Taani waits for Raj, she is surprised to see Suri appearing. As the couple starts dancing, Taani in a flashback realizes that Raj and Suri are the same person. Confronting him backstage upon conclusion, she learns of his love and tearfully accepts him after confessing how she feels. The couple reconcile after Suri comforts her, win the competition, and leave for their honeymoon in Japan.

== Cast ==
- Shah Rukh Khan as Surinder "Suri" Sahni / Raj Kapoor
- Anushka Sharma as Taani Gupta Sahni
- Vinay Pathak as Balwinder "Bobby" Khosla
- M. K. Raina as Professor Shirish Gupta, Taani's father
- Manmeet Singh Sawhney as Raju
- Nilofar Salehi as Dolly
- Rajesh Jais as Khanna, Surinder's colleague
- Anuj Tikku as D. K.
- Vineet Kapoor as Chadda
- Mark Sagato as Sumo Wrestler
- Richa Pallod as an actress in a film in the theatre (guest appearance)
- Shonali Nagrani (guest appearance)
- Rushad Rana (guest appearance)

Special appearances in the song "Phir Milenge Chalte Chalte"

- Preity Zinta as Sharmila Tagore
- Kajol as Nargis
- Rani Mukerji as Neetu Singh
- Bipasha Basu as Sadhana Shivdasani
- Lara Dutta as Helen

== Production ==
=== Themes ===
Rab Ne Bana Di Jodi tells a story from the point of view of an ordinary person and, most importantly, conveys a message that being 'ordinary' is cool. The filmmakers were confident that it would be able to strike a chord with millions because the film has ordinary people as its target audience:

"As middle-class people, so many of us have a routine life. We wake up in the morning, get dressed, go to the office, come back, sometimes for a change we buy things to take home, watch TV, eat dinner and go to sleep. And then we repeat this day after day, week after week. Rab Ne Bana Di Jodi talks about one such man who lives a routine life. It is a simple film at heart."

=== Casting ===
In February 2008, Aditya Chopra announced that he would be helming a film titled Rab Ne Bana Di Jodi which would once again star his lucky mascot, Shah Rukh Khan. It was initially speculated that Sonam Kapoor was cast as the lead actress, and that the film is inspired by the 1964 Hollywood film My Fair Lady, however Kapoor eventually dismissed reports about her inclusion in the film. The female lead was to be a newcomer who would be chosen following a massive talent hunt for a young, demure woman with quintessential Punjabi features. In May 2008, Yash Raj announced the casting of the 20-year-old model Anushka Sharma as the leading lady opposite Khan. Yash Chopra commented:

"We were looking first for someone who could truly embody the spirit of small-town Punjab. We know we have found her in Anushka. While she has no previous acting experience, we have seen that unique spark in her that makes us confident that she will be a standout even opposite Shah Rukh."

Sharma was chosen over hundreds of girls for this role and was kept hidden from the media during the filming. When asked about that, Khan said: "The idea was not to keep her a secret; we wanted her work to speak for her. When new actors come into films, it is important for people to see their work and then question them. It becomes easier after the film releases." Vinay Pathak was cast to play an important role in the film, making it his first commercial outing.

=== Filming ===
Principal photography began in May 2008 with producer Yash Chopra present at the shoot. A portion of the film was shot with Khan at the Golden Temple in Amritsar, Punjab. Khan had to lose the six-pack abs he developed for the song "Dard-E-Disco" from Om Shanti Om (2007) since he was playing the role of a very normal, regular person.

== Music ==
The soundtrack of Rab Ne Bana Di Jodi was composed by Salim–Sulaiman, with lyrics written by Jaideep Sahni, marking their second collaboration with Khan after Chak De! India (2007). The album was mixed by Vijay Dayal at YRF Studios in Mumbai and was mastered by Brian "Big Bass" Gardner at Bernie Grundman Mastering in Hollywood, Los Angeles, California.

The song "Phir Milenge Chalte Chalte" pays homage to Bollywood actors Raj Kapoor, Dev Anand, Shammi Kapoor, Rajesh Khanna and Rishi Kapoor and actresses Nargis Dutt, Sadhana Shivdasani, Helen Khan, Sharmila Tagore and Neetu Singh. The performance of the song includes appearances by Kajol Devgn, Bipasha Basu, Lara Dutta, Preity Zinta and Rani Mukerji.

Serbian pop singer Jelena Karleuša remade the song "Dance Pe Chance" as "Insomnia" in 2010. Bulgarian pop singer Ivana also made a copy of the same song as "Nedei".

The soundtrack of Rab Ne Bana Di Jodi was released on 14 November 2008. It is the first Bollywood soundtrack to reach the top 10 album sales for the iTunes Store. According to the Indian trade website Box Office India, with around 19,00,000 units sold, this film's soundtrack album was the year's second highest-selling.

== Release ==
=== Theatrical ===
Rab Ne Bana Di Jodi was released across 30 countries worldwide on 12 December 2008 on over 1,200 screens, including approximately 300 prints for the overseas market, making it the first time a Bollywood film was released on such a wide scale. Before release, the film witnessed a large volume of advance bookings. Aditya Chopra, who is known for maintaining secrecy over his films and not showing them to anyone until the day of release, made an exception and held a special screening on 23 November 2008 at Yash Raj Studios. The screening was attended by Khan and his family, Karan Johar, Yash Chopra, and debutante Sharma.

There was a huge debate in the industry whether Aditya Chopra's decision to go ahead with the release of the film in the wake of the terror strikes in Mumbai was the right one. With the trauma of the terrorist attacks on Mumbai city from 26–29 November still fresh, there was divided opinion on the release schedule. While some felt that Chopra should go ahead with the release because the public, tired and depressed after watching news of the attacks and the aftermath on television screens, would be waiting for a true entertainer to divert its mind, others thought he should postpone the film release as the audiences, not just in Mumbai but all over the country, were still not in a mood to visit theatres.

=== Promotion ===
The first poster of Rab Ne Bana Di Jodi was released in October in theatres and multiplexes across India, with full-page advertisements in national dailies. The first theatrical promo was released on 14 November, with Karan Johar's Dostana. Initially very little was known about the movie, and there were many theories floating around on the Internet about the story. The first music promo of the song "Haule Haule" was released on 2 November 2008, across all leading television channels to coincide with Khan's 43rd birthday. The song promo had received praise from the public.

=== Home media ===
Joginder Tuteja of Bollywood Hungama gave the DVD of Rab Ne Bana Di Jodi 3.5 out of 5 stars stating that it is a good choice if you "want to watch a clean family movie at home." The DVD includes the documentaries, The Making of the Film and The Making of the Songs ("Haule Haule", "Dance Pe Chance", "Phir Milenge Chalte Chalte"), as well as a number of deleted scenes and interviews. The film, was released on Blu-ray a year after its theatrical release. The movie is currently available on Netflix.

== Reception ==
=== Critical reception ===
Upon release, the film received positive reviews. Robert Abele of the Los Angeles Times calls Rab Ne Bana Di Jodi an "agreeably amusing comedy/romance/musical" noting that, "the magnetic Khan is a skilled enough comic actor with his physical transformation—like a Peter Sellers-ish recessive turning into a Jerry Lewis extrovert—that believing Taani wouldn't notice isn't difficult." Rachel Saltz of The New York Times describes it as "soft, sweet and slow, in the words of one of its songs. It deftly blends comedy, the ruling tone of the new Bollywood, with melodrama, the ruling tone of the old." Manish Gajjar of the BBC gave the film 4 out of 5 stars noting that, "Shah Rukh Khan makes you laugh and cry as the nerdy-looking, clumsy, bespectacled Surinder and all hip and happening Raj. A true professional in his own right, Khan breezes through his dialogues during the emotional and comic scenes." Frank Lovece of Film Journal International argues that it is "smarter and more self-aware of its rom-com contrivances than most Hollywood movies" and notes that while "the movie's cleverness eventually devolves into a simplistic Harlequin-Romance-for-males wish-fulfillment about beauty and the geek, it's a very well-acted variation on a Hollywood staple." Critic and author Maitland McDonagh of MissFlickChick.com stated that the film, "has been dismissed in some quarters as self-conscious and artificial, a coyly self-referential reworking of outdated movie tropes a la Todd Haynes' Far From Heaven, but it works for me in a way that most contemporary Hollywood romcoms don't."

The film also received some negative reviews. Rajeev Masand of CNN-IBN was critical, giving it 2 out of 5 stars and stating that "Aditya Chopra's return to direction after 8 years is marked by a flawed script, which in turn spawns a disappointing film. Where's the smart dialogue and the spirited characters that defined his debut film, Dilwale Dulhania Le Jayenge? There's no trace of either in this film...the problem then, at the root of Rab Ne Bana Di Jodi, is that much like those artificial sets in the film, the emotions too are contrived." Derek Elley of Variety argues that the film has "a huge, hollow center that sinks the project early on...A paper-thin script drags itself to the finish line amid tiresome mugging by Khan, a huge credibility gap (she never recognises him without his spectacles and moustache?), and a blah score with only one showstopper (featuring 5 famous actresses)."

A number of critics have further noted the similarities between this movie and superhero films. Khalid Mohamed, of the Hindustan Times, gave the film 3.5 out of 5 stars stating that Surinder "is a soul brother to the mousy Clark Kent-cum-Superman" who "makes you laugh and sob alternately." Mayank Shekhar from Mumbai Mirror gave the film three out of five stars and argues that "[The] same person, oppositely twinned, is usually the stuff of superhero films; the kinds of Clark Kent-Superman, Peter Parker-Spider-Man etc. You feel entirely lost in this fantasy flick because for the most part, it’s built around something so intimate and real. It’d be much easier to travel to foreign countries around far-fetched situations with fake heroes." In addition, Sudish Kamath of The Hindu stated that while Rab Ne Bana Di Jodi could have been an interesting art film exploring the dynamics of an arranged marriage, the director instead "treats this character type like Sam Raimi would treat Spider-Man...Superhero 'Raj' slips into costume and out, complaining about how it gets uncomfortable around the crotch, to win over his Mary Jane with not much saving-the-world business to keep him busy. But while Spidey does it for a bigger reason than just MJ, Raj’s sole motivation is to stalk his wife and play out his fantasy as somebody else. His obsession with his alter-ego reaches new heights when he wants his wife to cheat on the real him—the goofy Surinder Sahni who starts off well."

=== Box office ===
Rab Ne Bana Di Jodi collected ₹420 million (US$4.5 million) in its opening week. By its fourth week, it had earned ₹860 million (US$9.2 million), making it Shah Rukh Khan's fifth consecutive blockbuster in 3 years and Aditya Chopra's third blockbuster as a director. The film grossed $8.43 million in the overseas market of which $2.09 million was contributed by the United States and $2.24 million from the UK, and was declared as a blockbuster overseas.

At the end of its theatrical run, it grossed ₹1,578.9 million (US$17 million) worldwide, thus becoming Yash Raj Films' and Khan's highest-grossing film at the time of its release. It was the second-highest-grossing film domestically and the highest-grossing in the overseas market that year.

== Accolades ==
Award	Category	Recipients	Results
54th Filmfare Awards	Best Male Playback Singer	Sukhwinder Singh for "Haule Haule"	Won
54th Filmfare Awards	Best Scene of the Year	First breakfast flower scene	Won
54th Filmfare Awards	Best Film	Aditya Chopra	Nominated
54th Filmfare Awards	Best Director	Aditya Chopra	Nominated
54th Filmfare Awards	Best Actor	Shah Rukh Khan	Nominated
54th Filmfare Awards	Best Actress	Anushka Sharma	Nominated
54th Filmfare Awards	Best Female Debut	Anushka Sharma	Nominated
54th Filmfare Awards	Best Supporting Actor	Vinay Pathak	Nominated
54th Filmfare Awards	Best Female Playback Singer	Sunidhi Chauhan for "Dance Pe Chance"	Nominated
International Indian Film Academy Awards	Best Actor	Shah Rukh Khan	Nominated
International Indian Film Academy Awards	Best Actress	Anushka Sharma	Nominated
International Indian Film Academy Awards	Best Supporting Actor	Vinay Pathak	Nominated
International Indian Film Academy Awards	Best Lyrics	Jaideep Sahni for "Haule Haule"	Nominated
International Indian Film Academy Awards	Best Male Playback Singer	Sukhwinder Singh for "Haule Haule"	Nominated
Apsara Film and Television Producers Guild Awards	Best Actor	Shah Rukh Khan	Won
Apsara Film and Television Producers Guild Awards	Best Female Debut	Anushka Sharma	Won
Apsara Film and Television Producers Guild Awards	Best Lyrics	Jaideep Sahni for "Tujh Mein Rab Dikhta Hai"	Won
Apsara Film and Television Producers Guild Awards	Best Female Playback Singer	Shreya Ghoshal for "Tujh Mein Rab Dikhta Hai"	Won
Apsara Film and Television Producers Guild Awards	Best Choreography	Shiamak Davar for "Dance Pe Chance"	Won
Stardust Awards	Best Film	Aditya Chopra, Yash Chopra	Nominated
Stardust Awards	Best Director	Aditya Chopra	Nominated
Stardust Awards	Star of the Year - Male	Shah Rukh Khan	Nominated
Stardust Awards	Superstar of Tomorrow - Female	Anushka Sharma	Nominated
Star Screen Awards	Best Actor	Shah Rukh Khan	Nominated
Star Screen Awards	Most Promising Newcomer - Female	Anushka Sharma	Nominated
Star Screen Awards	Best Lyricist	Jaideep Sahni for "Haule Haule"	Nominated
Star Screen Awards	Best Male Playback Singer	Sukhwinder Singh for "Haule Haule"	Nominated
Star Screen Awards	Best Female Playback Singer	Sunidhi Chauhan for "Dance Pe Chance"	Nominated
Star Screen Awards	Best Choreography	Vaibhavi Merchant for "Haule Haule"	Nominated
