= Nikhat Kazmi =

Indian non-fiction writer

Nikhat Kazmi (1958/1959 – 20 January 2012) was a senior correspondent and well-known film critic from, born Allahabad, Uttar Pradesh, who had been writing for The Times of India since 1987. She died of breast cancer in 2012, at age 53.

== Books ==
- If Shakespeare was a gun: a play. Writers Workshop, 1984.
- Ire in the soul: bollywood's angry years. HarperCollins Publishers India, 1996. ISBN 81-7223-210-1.
- The Dream Merchants of Bollywood. UBS Publishers' Distribuors, 1998. ISBN 81-7476-181-0.
- Times Guide to Hollywood Blockbusters. Times Group Books. ISBN 81-89906-31-3.
- Times Movie Guide. 2007, Times Group Books. ISBN 81-89906-11-9.
