= List of awards and nominations received by Ranveer Singh =

Ranveer Singh awards and nominations
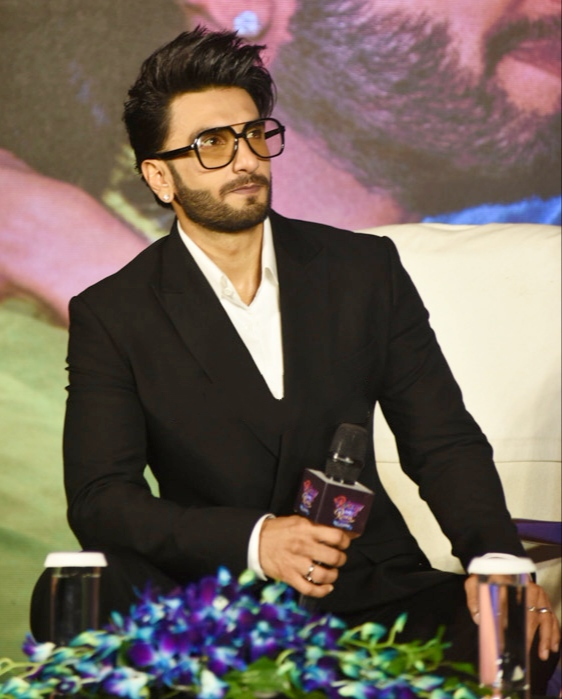
- Singh in 2023
Awards and nominations
| Award | Wins | Nominations |
| Producers Guild Awards | 2 | 2 |
| Filmfare Awards | 5 | 8 |
| Screen Awards | 6 | 7 |
| Zee Cine Awards | 6 | 10 |
| Stardust Awards | 2 | 4 |
| Star Guild Awards | 1 | 1 |
| IIFA Awards | 4 | 8 |
| ETC Bollywood Business Awards | 1 | 1 |
| BIG Star Entertainment Awards | 1 | 6 |
| People's Choice Awards | 0 | 1 |
| Times of India Film Awards | 2 | 2 |
| Indian Film Festival of Melbourne | 1 | 4 |
| Lions Gold Awards | 4 | 5 |
| Others | 20 | 50 |

Totals (Note: Certain award groups do not simply award one winner. They acknowledge several different recipients, have runners-up, and have third place. Since this is a specific recognition and is different from losing an award, runner-up mentions are considered wins in this award tally. For simplification and to avoid errors, each award in this list has been presumed to have had a prior nomination.)
- Wins: 79
- Nominations: 111

Ranveer Singh is an Indian actor who predominantly works in Hindi films. Singh is one of the most awarded actors from 2010's as he is the recipient of 78 awards into his credit respectively. He received five Filmfare Awards including Best Male Debut for the romance comedy Band Baaja Baaraat (2010), and Best Actor for his critically acclaimed performances in the epic historical romance Bajirao Mastani (2015), the musical drama film Gully Boy (2019) and the biographical sports drama film 83 (2021).

Singh received four IIFA Awards including two Best Actor for his performance in the romantic action drama Goliyon Ki Raasleela Ram-Leela and historical Bajirao Mastani. He also won the Filmfare Award for Best Actor (Critics) for historical drama Padmaavat (2019). He has also received six Best Actor Award at Star Screen Awards and three at Zee Cine Awards.

He received several nominations at the ceremony for Goliyon Ki Raasleela Ram-Leela (2013) Padmaavat (2019) and 83 (2021).

== Filmfare Awards ==
The Filmfare Awards is one of the oldest and most prominent Hindi film award ceremonies. They are presented annually by The Times Group to honour both artistic and technical excellence.

| Year | Nominated work | Category | Result | Ref. |
|---|---|---|---|---|
| 2011 | Band Baaja Baaraat | Best Male Debut | Won | |
| 2014 | Goliyon Ki Raasleela Ram-Leela | Best Actor | Nominated | |
| 2016 | Bajirao Mastani | Best Actor | Won | |
| 2019 | Padmaavat | Best Actor (Critics) | Won (Note: Tied with Ayushmann Khurrana for Andhadhun.) | |
| 2019 | Padmaavat | Best Actor | Nominated | |
| 2020 | Gully Boy | Best Actor | Won | |
| 2022 | 83 | Best Actor | Won | |
| 2022 | 83 | Best Actor (Critics) | Nominated | |
| 2024 | Rocky Aur Rani Kii Prem Kahaani | Best Actor | Nominated | |

== International Indian Film Academy Awards ==
The International Indian Film Academy Awards (IIFA Awards) are organised by Wizcraft International Entertainment Pvt. Ltd. to honour members of the Bollywood film industry.

| Year | Nominated work | Category | Result | Ref. |
|---|---|---|---|---|
| 2011 | Band Baaja Baaraat | Star Debut of the Year – Male | Won | |
| 2011 | Band Baaja Baaraat | Hottest Pair (along with Anushka Sharma) | Won | |
| 2014 | Goliyon Ki Raasleela Ram-Leela | Best Actor | Nominated | |
| 2016 | Bajirao Mastani | Best Actor | Won | |
| 2019 | Padmaavat | Best Actor | Won | |
| 2021 | Gully Boy | Best Actor | Nominated | |
| 2021 | Gully Boy | Best Male Playback Singer (for "Mere Gully Mein") | Nominated | |
| 2022 | 83 | Best Actor | Nominated | |

== Star Screen Awards ==
The Star Screen Awards is a yearly ceremony honouring professional excellence in the Hindi language film industry.

| Year | Nominated work | Category | Result | Ref. |
|---|---|---|---|---|
| 2011 | Band Baaja Baaraat | Most Promising Newcomer – Male | Won | |
| 2011 | Band Baaja Baaraat | Best Actor (Popular Choice) | Nominated | |
| 2016 | Bajirao Mastani | Best Ensemble Cast | Won | |
| 2016 | Bajirao Mastani | Best Actor | Won | |
| 2019 | Padmaavat | Best Actor | Won | |
| 2020 | Gully Boy | Best Actor | Won | |
| 2020 | —N/a | Entertainer of the Year | Won | |
| 2026 | Dhurandhar | Best Actor | Won | |

== Stardust Awards ==
The Stardust Awards are presented by Stardust magazine. They honour professional excellence in the Hindi film industry.

| Year | Nominated work | Category | Result | Ref. |
|---|---|---|---|---|
| 2011 | Band Baaja Baaraat | Superstar of Tomorrow – Male | Won | |
| 2011 | Band Baaja Baaraat | Best Actor – Comedy/Romance | Nominated | |
| 2014 | Gunday | Jodi of the Year (along with Arjun Kapoor) | Won | |
| 2014 | Gunday | Best Actor Of The Year – Male | Nominated | |

== Zee Cine Awards ==
The Zee Cine Awards are presented by Zee Entertainment Enterprises for the Hindi film industry. The awards were inaugurated in 1998 and are a mixture of categories decided on by public votes and by an industry jury. The awards were not presented in 2009 and 2010, but were resumed from 2011.

| Year | Nominated work | Category | Result | Ref. |
|---|---|---|---|---|
| 2011 | Band Baaja Baaraat | Best Male Debut | Won | |
| 2014 | Goliyon Ki Raasleela Ram-Leela | Best Actor | Nominated | |
| 2016 | Bajirao Mastani | Best Actor (Critics) – Male | Won | |
| 2016 | Bajirao Mastani | Best Actor (Male) | Nominated | |
| 2019 | Padmaavat | Best Actor (Male) | Won | |
| 2020 | Gully Boy | Best Actor (Male) | Won | |
| 2020 | Gully Boy | Best Actor (Critics) – Male | Nominated | |
| 2020 | Gully Boy | Song of the Year ("Apna Time Aayega") | Won | |
| 2020 | Gully Boy | Best Jodi (with Siddhant Chaturvedi) | Won | |
| 2024 | Rocky Aur Rani Kii Prem Kahaani | Best Actor | Nominated | |

== BIG Star Entertainment Awards ==
The BIG Star Entertainment Awards is an annual event organised by the Reliance Broadcast Network.

| Year | Nominated work | Category | Result | Ref. |
|---|---|---|---|---|
| 2011 | Band Baaja Baaraat | Most Entertaining Film Actor – Male | Nominated | |
| 2013 | Goliyon Ki Raasleela Ram-Leela | Most Entertaining Film Actor – Male | Nominated | |
| 2013 | Lootera | Most Entertaining Film Actor – Male | Nominated | |
| 2013 | Lootera | Most Entertaining Actor in a Romantic Film – Male | Nominated | |
| 2014 | Gunday | Most Entertaining Actor in an Action Film – Male | Nominated | |
| 2015 | Dil Dhadakne Do | Most Entertaining Actor in a Romantic Film – Male | Won | |

== Producers Guild Film Awards ==
The Producers Guild Film Awards (previously known as the Apsara Film & Television Producers Guild Awards) are presented by the Producers Guild to honour and recognise the professional excellence of their peers.

| Year | Nominated work | Category | Result | Ref. |
|---|---|---|---|---|
| 2011 | Band Baaja Baaraat | Best Male Debut | Won | |
| 2015 | Bajirao Mastani | Best Actor in a Leading Role | Won | |

== ETC Bollywood Business Awards ==
The ETC Bollywood Business Awards are presented annually by ETC Bollywood Business to award Bollywood films. This is the only award in India which judges films based on their box-office performances.

| Year | Nominated work | Category | Result | Ref. |
|---|---|---|---|---|
| 2018 | Padmaavat & Simmba | Highest Grossing Actor of the Year | Won | |

== Times of India Film Awards ==
| Year | Nominated work | Category | Result | Ref. |
|---|---|---|---|---|
| 2016 | Bajirao Mastani | Best Actor – Male | Won | |
| 2016 | Bajirao Mastani | Best On-Screen Jodi of the Year (along with Deepika Padukone) | Won | |

== South Indian International Movie Awards ==
| Year | Nominated work | Category | Result | Ref. |
|---|---|---|---|---|
| 2022 | Honoured | Most Loved Hindi Actor in South India | Won | |

== Indian National Cine Academy Awards ==
| Year | Nominated work | Category | Result | Ref. |
|---|---|---|---|---|
| 2026 | Dhurandhar | Best Actor – Hindi | Won | |

== Other awards and recognition ==
| Year | Work | Award | Category | Result | Ref. |
|---|---|---|---|---|---|
| 2016 | Bajirao Mastani | NDTV Indian of the Year Awards | Entertainer of the Year | Won | |
| 2018 | Padmaavat | Asiavision Awards | Best Actor | Won | |
| 2021 | 83 | Indian Television Academy Awards | Best Actor of the Year | Won | |
| 2023 | —N/a | Bollywood Hungama Style Icons | Most Stylish Leading Star (Male) | Nominated | |

== See also ==
- List of accolades received by Bajirao Mastani
- List of accolades received by Dil Dhadakne Do
- List of accolades received by Padmaavat
