= Jaswant Singh Gill =

Indian mining engineer

SJRP Jaswant Singh Gill
- Born: 22 November 1939; Sathiala, Amritsar, Punjab (India)
- Died: 26 November 2019 (aged 80); Amritsar, Punjab (India)
- Other name: Capsule Gill
- Education: B.S. (non-medical) from Khalsa College, Amritsar, Punjab (in 1959); B. Tech in Mining Engineering from IIT (ISM), Dhanbad, Jharkhand (in 1965)
- Years active: 1989-2019
- Employers: Karam Chand Thapar & Bros (coal Sales) Limited (1965-1973); Coal India (1973-1998)
- Known for: 1989 Raniganj miners rescue operation
- Spouse: Nirdosh Kaur Gill
- Children: 4
- Awards: Sarvottam Jeevan Raksha Padak

Jaswant Singh Gill (22 November 1939 – 26 November 2019) was an Indian engineer at Coal India known for his efforts in rescuing 65 coal miners trapped in a flooded mine in Raniganj, West Bengal, in 1989.

== Early life and education ==
Gill was born on 22 November 1939 in Sathiala, Amritsar, Punjab, India. He completed his early education at an Urdu School in Amritsar and later attended Khalsa College School. He pursued a B.Sc. (non-medical) from Khalsa College, Amritsar in 1959, and graduated in Mining Engineering from the Indian Institute of Technology (Indian School of Mines), Dhanbad, Jharkhand in 1965.

== Career ==
After completing his education, Gill started working for Chand Thapar & Bros (coal Sales) Limited in 1965 and later joined Coal India Limited in 1973. He was known for his innovative approach and dedication to mining safety.

=== 1989 Raniganj rescue operation ===
On night of 13 November 1989 during a time blast at the Mahabir Colliery, Burdwan (Raniganj) in West Bengal a sudden flood trapped 71 miners in an underground mine (below 350 ft ground level).

Gill was serving as the additional chief mining engineer at Chitra Mines but voluntarily reached the Raniganj coal mine and led a daring rescue operation which started early morning on 16 November 1989 at 2:30 AM and continued for 6 hours, he successfully rescued 65 miners. He devised a plan to construct a steel capsule to transport miners to safety one by one.

I believe that in a time of calamity, one doesn't have the time to be afraid. One has to act.

His efforts were recognized with the prestigious 'Sarvottam Jeevan Raksha Padak' by then-President of India, Ramaswamy Venkataraman, in 1991.

=== Post-retirement ===
Gill retired from Coal India in 1998 at the age of 60. In 2008, he was appointed as a member in Disaster management committee at Amritsar, Punjab (India).

=== 2018 Meghalaya rescue operation ===
Gill was invited during 2018 Meghalaya mining accident by Conrad Sangma, 12th Chief Minister of Meghalaya due to his expertise in mine mishaps for a rescue operation held in December 2018 at East Jaintia hills, Meghalaya, India. Gill suggested Meghalaya state government to take help from Coal India.

== Personal life ==
Gill was married to Nirdosh Kaur, and they had two sons and two daughters (Poonam Gill and Hina Gill).His best friend in early days was chandra Dev Mishra from Nirsa His elder son, Sarpreet Singh Gill is a cardiologist from Johns Hopkins University who returned to Amritsar in 2008, and his younger son, Randip Singh Gill, is an entrepreneur and real estate professional in Vancouver, Canada.

== Death ==
Gill died on 26 November 2019 due to cardiac arrest at his home in Amritsar, Punjab.

== Awards and honours ==
- Sarvottam Jeevan Raksha Padak (1991)
- Limca Book of Records for most successful coal mine rescue operation (2005)
- World Book of Records for largest coal mine rescue operation
- Lifetime Achievement Award for Mining by the Indian School of Mines Alumni Association (2009)
- Bhagat Singh Puran Award (2016)
- Pride of the Nation Award (2019)
- Honorary Doctorate (PhD) by Universal Achievers University (2019)
- Bangla Gaurav Samman (2024)
- Kohinoor E Hind National Award by Mother India Care Trust (2024)

== Legacy ==
A roundabout in Majitha Road in Amritsar was named after Gill in 2021, two years after his death. A capsule (replica of what Gill used in 1989 rescue mission) was installed at an Amritsar Roundabout in 2023, four years after his death.

== In popular culture ==
A film titled 'Mission Raniganj' , directed by Tinu Suresh Desai was released in 2023. In the film, Akshay Kumar played the lead role of Gill.
