= ETC Bollywood Business Awards =

Indian Bollywood film award

- Awarded for: the box-office performance of the films
- Country: India
- Presented by: ETC Bollywood Business
- First award: 2010

The ETC Bollywood Business Awards are presented annually by ETC Bollywood Business to award Bollywood films. This is the only award in India which judges films based on their box-office performances. The ETC Bollywood Business Awards were launched in 2010.

== Categories ==
The awards are given in the following categories:

- Top Grossing Film of the Year
- Most Profitable Actor (Male)
- Most Profitable Actor (Female)
- Highest Grossing Director
- Highest Grossing Actor
- Highest Grossing Actress
- Most Profitable Male Debut
- Most Profitable Female Debut
- Most Profitable Actor Overseas
- Most Profitable Banner
- Most Profitable Producer
- The 100 Crore Club
- Most Successful Music Director
- Box Office Surprise Hit of the Year
- Most Successful Small Budget Film
- Best Marketed Film of the Year
- Most popular song of 2012
- Best Cinema Chain
- Most Popular Trailer
- Best Music Company

== Winners ==
=== 2010 ===
Top Grosser of the Year
Dabangg
Most Profitable Actor	Most Profitable Actress
Ajay Devgn	Katrina Kaif
Best Marketed Film	Most Successful Small Budget Film
My Name Is Khan	Peepli Live

=== 2011 ===
The 2011 action drama Bodyguard was awarded Top Grosser of the Year. Actor Salman Khan garnered the Most Profitable Actor (Male) award, while Shah Rukh Khan won for Most Profitable Actor (Overseas). The actress who won the Most Profitable Actor (Female) was Kareena Kapoor. The superhero film Ra.One was declared Best Marketed Film Of The Year. The film also won the Best Marketed Movie of the Year and the Highest Single-Day Collections awards. Eros International earned the award for Excellence in International Distribution.

=== 2012 ===
Salman Khan won his third consecutive award for Most Profitable Actor (Male) while Katrina Kaif garnered the Most Profitable Actor (Female) honour. The film Ek Tha Tiger was declared as Top Grossing Film of the Year. Akshay Kumar went on to win for Highest Grossing Actor. Sonakshi Sinha won the Highest Grossing Actress award. Shah Rukh Khan won his second consecutive award for Most Profitable Actor (Overseas).

=== 2013 ===
Actor Aamir Khan won Highest Grossing Actor (Male) for his 2013 released film Dhoom 3. Deepika Padukone took the award for Highest Grossing Actor (Female) for her films released in 2013.

=== 2014 ===
Aamir Khan won his 2nd consecutive Highest Grossing Actor (Male) award for the film PK, while Anushka Sharma won Highest Grossing Actor (Female) award for the same film.

=== 2015 ===
Salman Khan won Highest grossing Actor (Male) award for Bajrangi Bhaijaan and Prem Ratan Dhan Payo. Kareena Kapoor won Highest Grossing Actress (Female) award for Bajrangi Bhaijaan.

=== 2016 ===
Akshay Kumar won highest grossing actor (Male) Tinu Suresh Desai directing film Rustom box office collection ₹218.12 crore

=== 2018 ===
Ranveer Singh took Highest Grossing Actor (Male) award for his two highly successful films Padmaavat and Simmba. Sonam Kapoor took Highest Grossing Actor (Female) award for Veere Di Wedding, Pad Man and Sanju.

=== 2019 ===
Action Blockbuster War won highest grossing Film of the Year. Akshay Kumar received highest grossing Actor award for Kesari, Mission Mangal, Housefull 4 and Good Newwz while Kiara Advani took highest grossing Actress award for Kabir Singh and Good Newwz.

- Prabhas won the Highest Grossing Debut Actor Award for Saaho
