= Ati Vishisht Seva Medal =

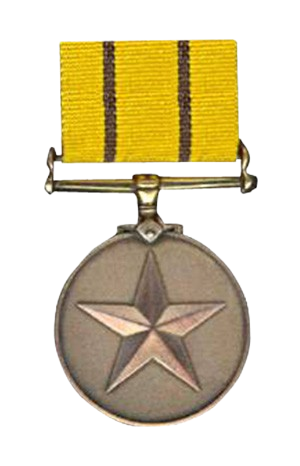
- Type: Military medal Service medal
- Awarded for: Distinguished Service
- Country: India
- Presented by: President of India
- Established: January 26, 1960

Precedence
- Next (higher): Sarvottam Jeevan Raksha Padak
- Equivalent: Uttam Yudh Seva Medal (Note: Though the Ati Vishisht Seva Medal is placed below the Uttam Yudh Seva Medal in the precedence, it is considered as a peacetime equivalent of Uttam Yudh Seva Medal.)
- Next (lower): Vir Chakra

Ati Vishisht Seva Medal (AVSM, lit. 'Very Distinguished Service Medal') is a military award of India given to recognize "distinguished service of an exceptional order" to all ranks of the armed forces. The award is a peacetime equivalent of Uttam Yuddh Seva Medal, which is a Wartime Distinguished Service decoration.

The award can also be granted posthumously. Subsequent awards are represented by a bar worn on the ribbon. The awardee can use "AVSM" as post-nominal letters.

== History ==
The Ati Vishisht Seva Medal was originally instituted as the "Vishisht Seva Medal, Class II" on 26 January 1960. Five other medals were instituted on the same day - the Sainya Seva Medal, Sena Medal, Nau Sena Medal and the Vayu Sena Medal. It was renamed on January 27, 1961, and the badge signed. Since 1980 the awarding of the medal have been restricted to operational service as the Yudh Seva Medal was created to recognize distinguished services in an operational environment.

== Design ==
The Ati Vishisht Seva Medal is made of silver gilt and has on its obverse a five-pointed star and on its reverse the Lion Capital. The ribbon is gold in colour and is 32mm wide with two dark-blue stripes dividing it into three equal parts.

Additional awards of the Ati Vishisht Seva Medal are represented by a bar worn on the ribbon.
