= IIT (ISM) Dhanbad =

Engineering institute in Jharkhand, India

Indian Institute of Technology (Indian School of Mines) Dhanbad
- College Logo
- Other names: IIT Dhanbad, ISM Dhanbad
- Motto: Sanskrit: Uttiṣṭhata jāgrata prāpya varānnibodhata
- Motto in English: Arise, awake, and stop not till the goal is reached!
- Type: Public technical university
- Established: 9 December 1926; 99 years ago (as ISM Dhanbad); 25 May 2016; 10 years ago (as IIT Dhanbad)
- Accreditation: Institute of National Importance
- Affiliations: Ministry of Education
- Chairman: Prem Vrat
- Director: Sukumar Mishra
- Academic staff: 414
- Administrative staff: 180
- Students: 8,548
- Undergraduates: 4,158
- Postgraduates: 1,400
- Doctoral students: 1,102
- Location: Dhanbad, Jharkhand, India; 23.8133°N 86.4419°E
- Campus: Urban
- Nicknames: IITians, ISMites
- Website: www.iitism.ac.in

The Indian Institute of Technology (Indian School of Mines) Dhanbad is one of India's oldest technical universities. It is located in the mineral-rich region of eastern India, in Dhanbad, Jharkhand.

IIT Dhanbad is the third oldest institute (after IIT Roorkee, and IIT (BHU) Varanasi) which got converted into an IIT. It was established by the British Indian Government on the lines of the Royal School of Mines - London, and was formally inaugurated on 9 December 1926 by Lord Irwin, the then Viceroy of India. It started as an institution to impart education in mining and mineral sciences, and today, has grown into a technical institution with various academic departments. IIT (ISM) Dhanbad admits its undergraduate students through Joint Entrance Examination (Advanced), previously IIT-JEE and postgraduate from Graduate Aptitude Test in Engineering (GATE) examination.

On 25 May 2016, the Union Cabinet headed by Prime Minister Modi gave its approval to amend the Institutes of Technology Act, 1961 for conversion of ISM Dhanbad into an Indian Institute of Technology. The amendment was approved by Indian Parliament and upon Presidential assent, was notified in the Gazette of India on 10 August 2016.

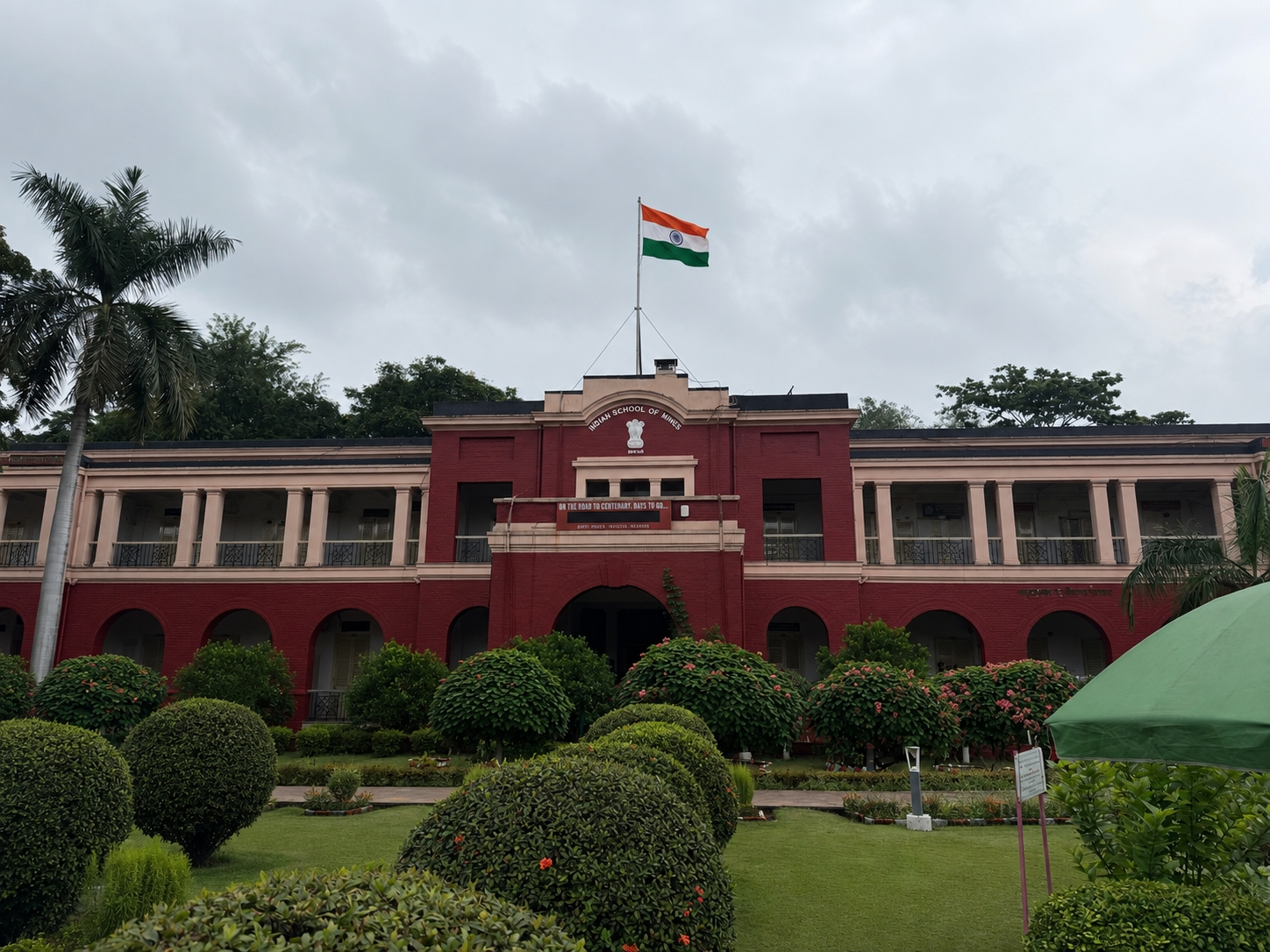
Heritage Building of IIT (ISM) Dhanbad

== History ==
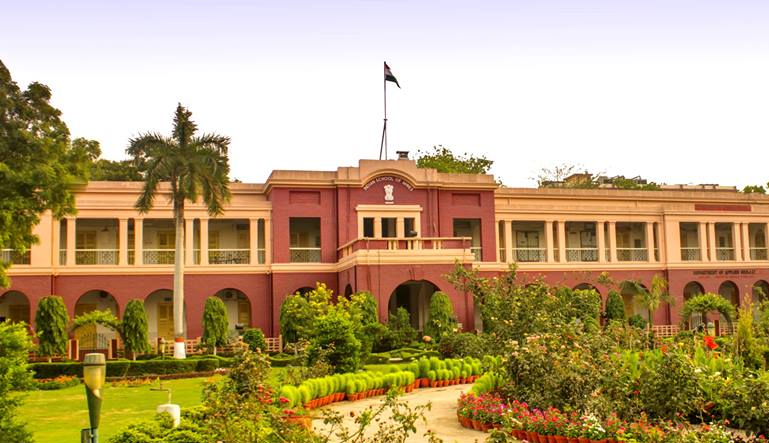
Heritage Building at IIT Dhanbad

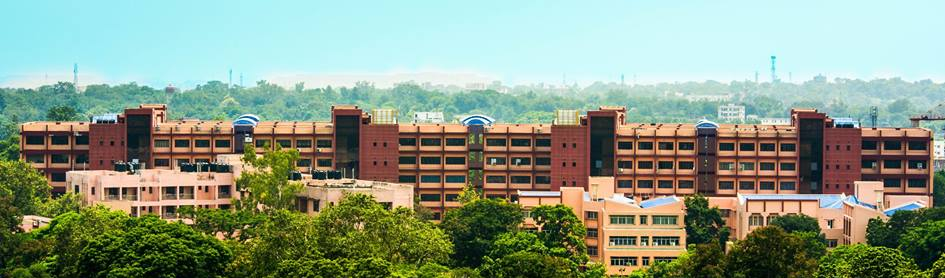
New Academic Complex in campus

The Indian National Congress at its XVII Session of December 1901 passed a resolution stating that:

The Indian National Congress is of opinion that a Government College of Mining Engineering be established in some suitable place in India on the models of the Royal School of Mines in England...

The McPherson Committee formed by Government of British India, recommended the establishment of an institution for imparting education in the fields of mining and geology, whose report, submitted in 1920 along with approach of Indian Mine Managers' of India in 1924, formed the main basis for establishment of the Indian School of Mines & Applied Geology at Dhanbad on 9 December 1926. From 1926 to 1946 it was led by Prof F. W. Sharpley.

The institute originally offered courses mainly in Mining Engineering and Applied Geology when it opened. In 1957, the institute began offering courses in Petroleum Engineering and Applied Geophysics and the name was changed to Indian School of Mines. Up to 1967, it was a government institute where the faculties were recruited through Union Public Service Commission (UPSC).

The school was granted university status by the University Grants Commission under the University Grants Commission Act, 1956 in 1967. Later courses in Mining Machinery Engineering and Mineral Engineering were started in 1975 and 1976 respectively. It was among the few institutes to start courses in Industrial Engineering and Management (in 1977), to cater to the needs of industries like metallurgy, mining and manufacturing.

From 1996 to 1997 the school came directly under the financial and administrative controls of Ministry of Human Resource Development, Government of India with pay scales and perks to its employees at par with that of Indian Institutes of Technology and Indian Institutes of Management. In 1997, the institute began admitting students through the IIT Joint Entrance Examination (IIT-JEE) conducted jointly by the IITs and ISM. In 1998 courses for Electronics Engineering and Computer Science and Engineering were introduced and in 1999, the institute started a bachelor of technology course in Mechanical Engineering.

In 2006, IIT (ISM) Dhanbad added 14 new courses, prominent among them being Electrical Engineering and a course in Environmental Engineering in the undergraduate curriculum. From 2006, IIT (ISM) Dhanbad also started offering Integrated Master of Science (Int. MSc) in Applied Physics, Applied Chemistry and Mathematics & Computing, and Integrated Master of Science and Technology (Int. MSc Tech) courses for Applied Geology and Applied Geophysics. In 2011, the institute offered a BTech programme in Chemical Engineering. The institute introduced Civil Engineering in 2013 and Engineering Physics in 2014.

=== Conversion to Indian Institute of Technology ===
While a proposal to upgrade ISM Dhanbad to an Institutes of National Importance had been put as early as 1994 by a Government Committee, no action was taken by the Government over this proposal.

A proposal for the conversion was included in the 12th Five year plan after its passage through the National Development Council (NDC), on 27 December 2012, and put across the IIT Council on 7 January 2013.

The Union Finance Minister Arun Jaitley, during his budget speech in Parliament on 28 February 2015, proposed to upgrade ISM Dhanbad into an IIT. On 25 May 2016, the Union Cabinet approved that a bill be introduced in Parliament for converting ISM Dhanbad into an IIT. On 19 July 2016 the Institutes of Technology (Amendment) Bill, 2016 was introduced into the Lok Sabha. It was passed by the Lok Sabha without opposition on 25 July 2016. The Rajya Sabha unanimously passed the Bill on 2 August 2016. The Bill got the Presidential assent and a Gazette notification was made on 6 September 2016, thus officially conferring Indian Institute of Technology tag to erstwhile Indian School of Mines, Dhanbad.

== Campus ==
IIT (ISM) Dhanbad campus total campus size is around 444.98 acres, and with its main campus of size approximately 218 acres located in Sardar Patel Nagar of Dhanbad and 226.98 acres of upcoming campus in Nirsa, Dhanbad. The institute has around 10000 students with 3732 undergraduate students, 1951 postgraduate students, and 2418 doctoral students.

=== Hostels ===
The institute has 11 hostels which are all named around some precious stones like Diamond, Sapphire, Amber, Ruby, Opal, Jasper, Aquamarine. Some of these hostels are as old as 94 years, and have capacities ranging from 400 to 2200 students. Four of them are for girls and remaining Seven for boys, both include one hostel each for international students.

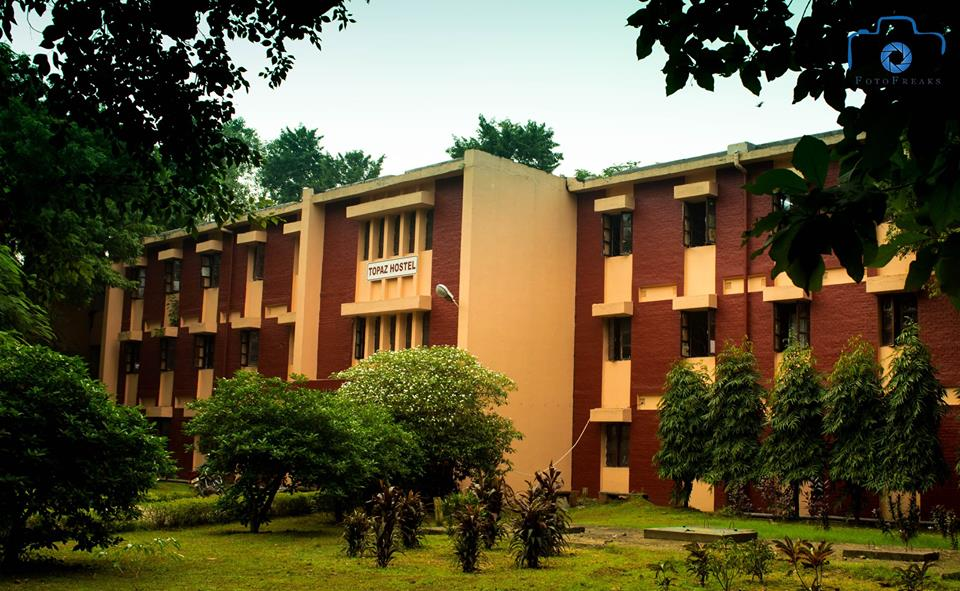
Topaz Hostel

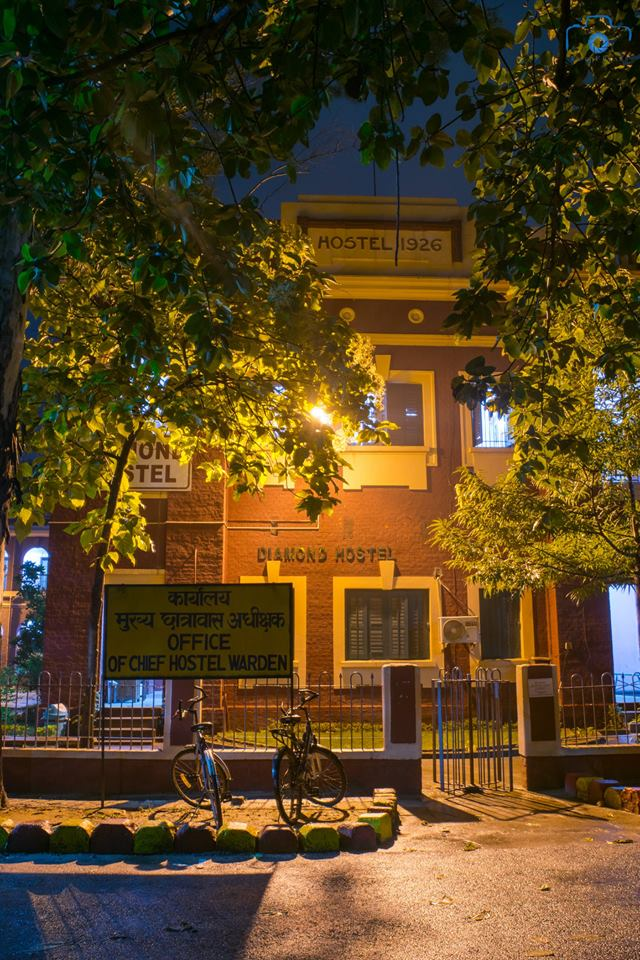
Diamond Hostel

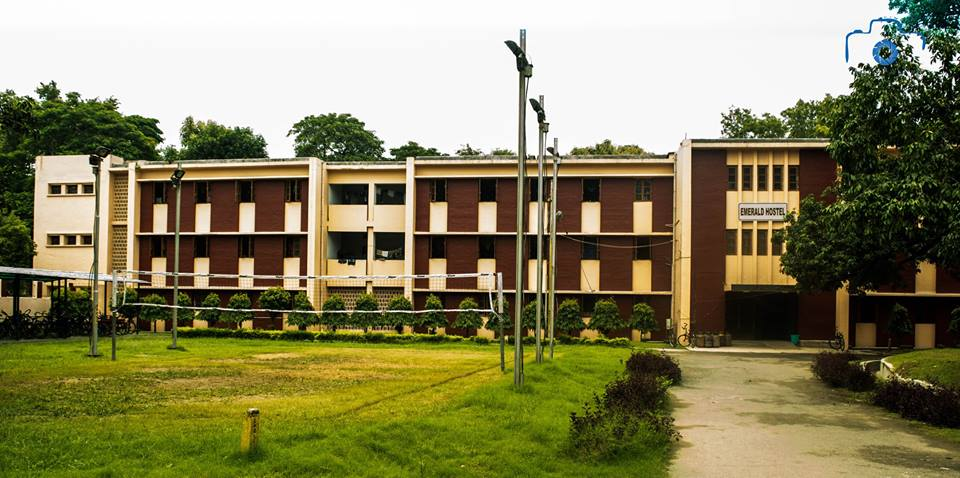
Emerald Hostel

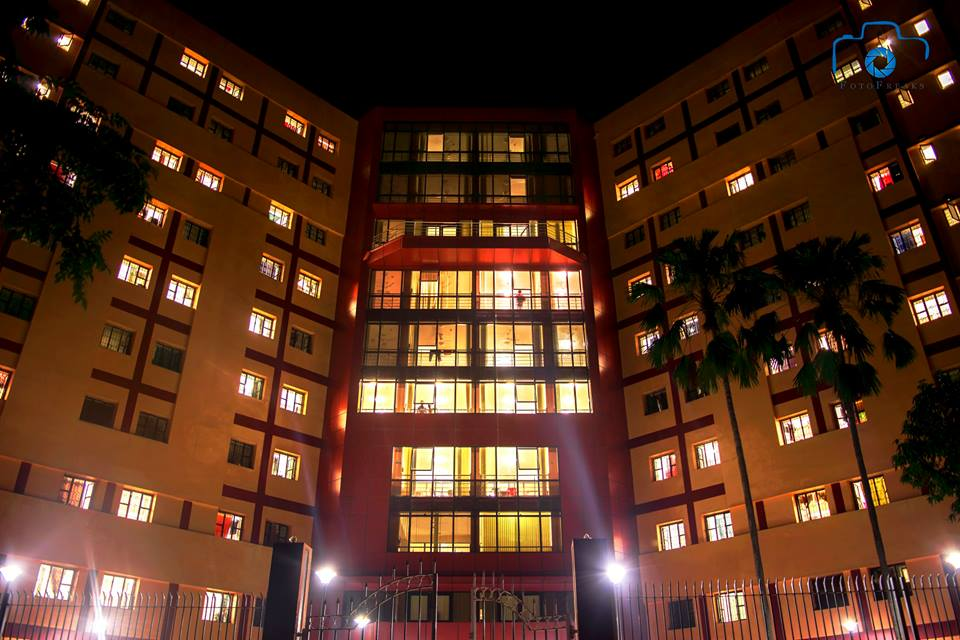
Rosaline Hostel

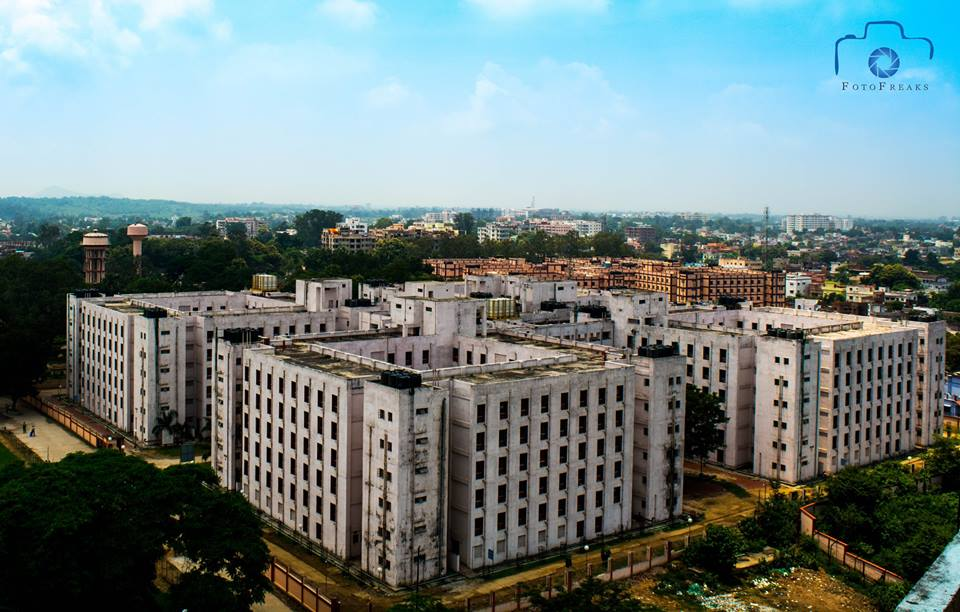
Jasper Hostel

=== Hotspots ===
The campus has various places where students like to spend their major portion of their time apart from taking classes in the lecture halls.

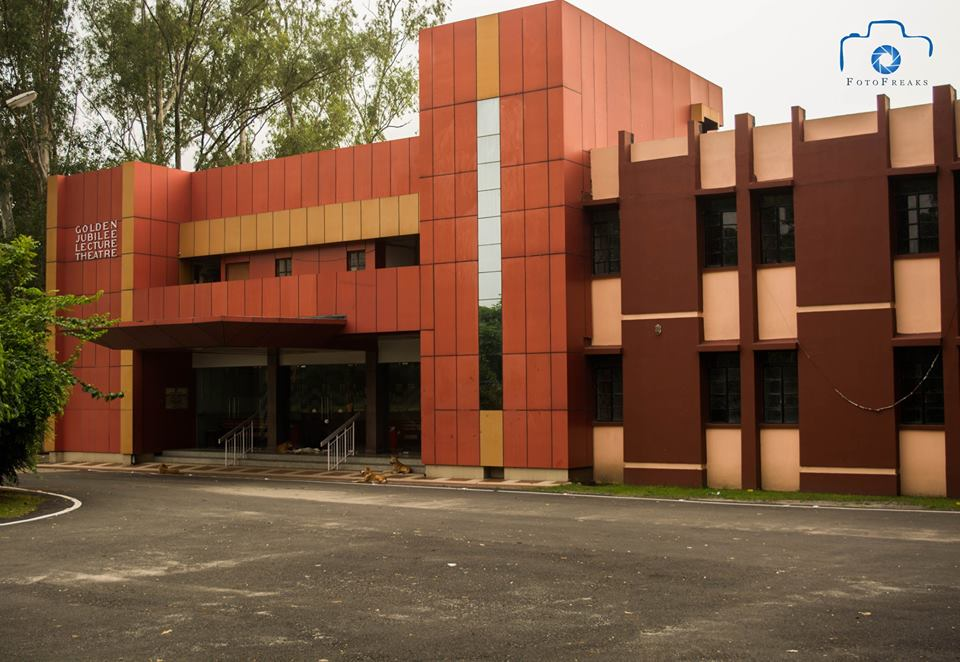
Golden Jubilee Lecture Theatre (GJLT)

These include: Student Activity Center (SAC), Main Canteen, Ram Dhani (RD), Library Basement (with eating establishments like Domino's and KFC) , Penman Auditorium, Heritage Building, Oval Garden and Ruby Park.

== Organisation and administration ==
=== Departments ===
IIT (ISM) Dhanbad has the following departments offering courses in various academic programs:

Departments
Engineering	Basic Sciences
Department of Mechanical Engineering; Department of Chemical Engineering; Department of Civil Engineering; Department of Computer Science and Engineering; Department of Electrical Engineering; Department of Electronics Engineering; Department of Environmental Science and Engineering; Department of Fuel, Mineral and Metallurgical Engineering; Department of Mining Engineering; Department of Petroleum Engineering	Department of Chemistry and Chemical Biology; Department of Applied Geology; Department of Applied Geophysics; Department of Mathematics & Computing; Department of Physics
Social Sciences	Business
Department of Humanities and Social Science	Department of Management Studies & Industrial Engineering (Formerly Industrial Engineering & Management)

=== Research Centres & Industry Interaction Centres ===
- An eight-storey Central Research Facility has been set up at IIT (ISM) Dhanbad as a Centre of National Importance. IIT (ISM) works as a think tank for eleven ministries of the Govt. of India.
- Industry Institute Interaction Facility, Kolkata: An Industry Institute Interaction Facility, Kolkata has been established in Kolkata, for hosting campus interviews and international conferences, etc. Another Industry Institute Interaction Facility is being set up in Delhi, and will be ready by 2016.
- The Environmental Information System (ENVIS), a centre at Centre of Mining Environment (CME), Indian School of Mines (ISM), was established in 1991 by the then Ministry of Environment and Forests (MoEF), Government of India, for collection, storage, retrieval and dissemination of information in the area of mining environment.
- AICCET- Australia India Clean Coal and Energy Technology Center - It is a joint center between IIT(ISM), Dhanbad and Curtin University, Australia and it is located at Fuel, Minerals and Metallurgical Department building at IIT(ISM)

== Academics ==
=== Academic programs ===
IIT (ISM) Dhanbad offers courses in engineering, pure sciences, management and humanities with a focus on engineering. The institute has 18 departments and five inter-disciplinary centers. The Department of Mining Engineering has been accorded the status of "Center of Advanced Studies" by the University Grants Commission.

Admission to the courses of BTech and Integrated BTech-MTech are done from JEE Advanced qualified students. Admission to the MTech courses are done either through the Graduate Aptitude Test in Engineering (GATE) or through a special examination conducted by the institute. Admissions to the MBA program is done through the Common Admission Test (CAT). Admission to the MSc, Integrated MSc-MTech course and PhD courses are done through exams conducted by the institute.

Various courses offered by institute include:

- BTech Course (Duration – 4 Years)
- Integrated BTech-MTech Course (Duration - 5 Years)
- Integrated BS-MS Course (Duration- 5 Years)
- Integrated B.Sc.- B.Ed. Program (Duration- 4 Years)
- MTech Course (Duration - 2 years)
- MSc Course (Duration – 2 Years)
- Integrated MSc-MTech Course (Duration - 3 years)
- MBA Programme (Duration – 2 years)
- MA in Digital Humanities and Social Sciences (Duration - 2 years)
- PhD
- Post-Doctoral Fellowships (PDFs)

=== Rankings ===
University and college rankings

General – international
- QS (Asia) (2023): 281–290
- Times (World) (2023): 1001–1200
- Times (Asia) (2022): 251-300
- Times (Emerging) (2022): 251-300

General – India
- NIRF (Overall) (2024): 35

Engineering – India
- NIRF (2024): 15

Business/Management – India
- NIRF (2024): 46

Internationally, IIT (ISM) Dhanbad was ranked 281–290 in Asia on the QS World University Rankings of 2023. It was ranked 1001–1200 in the world by the Times Higher Education World University Rankings of 2023, 251-300 in Asia in 2022 and in the same band among emerging economies. In 2026, QS World Ranking, the institute was ranked 701-710.

In India, it was ranked 15th among engineering colleges by the National Institutional Ranking Framework (NIRF) in 2025 in Engineering category, 22nd in research and 35th in the Overall category.

The institute was ranked 48th in NIRF for its management course of the Department of Management Studies in 2025.

== Student life ==
=== Fests and Events ===
The institute hosts many fests including but not limited to:-

- Srijan- One of the biggest Socio-Cultural Fest in Eastern India, organised by IIT (ISM) Dhanbad
- Concetto- The Tech Fest of IIT (ISM) Dhanbad
- Parakram- Sports Fest of IIT (ISM) Dhanbad
- Basant- The Annual Alumni Meet of ISM Dhanbad
- Khannan- India's Largest Techno-Mining Fest

Apart from these the institute also hosts inter-house and inter-hostel competitions and cultural competitions and technical fests of various departments.

=== Student Gymkhana ===
The Students' Gymkhana (SG) gives students a role in the administrative and academic governance of the Institute and helps them develop leadership and administrative skills. SG activities subordinate to academic activities. The SG functions through the Students' Senate and its Executive wing. The Senate is the Central Representative, Legislative and Supervisory body of the students. The student body is elected through Gymkhana elections held every year in the month of March.

=== Sports & Physical Education Centre (SPEC) ===
The proffesional landscape increasing demands workforce proficiency in both Intellectual Quotient (IQ) and Emotional Quotient (EQ).Success in modern and professional landscapes relies heavily on the collaborative abilities of an individual, including navigating non-complementary team dynamics to maximize collective potential, executing and delegating tasks,and maintaining operational commitment through project completion. Developing these multifaceted skills can be achieved through athletic participation. The IIT sports club provides an structured enviornment to cultivate these professional skills.

=== Placements ===
IIT (ISM) Dhanbad has achieved a milestone in placements, with over 750 students securing placements the previous year.(This placement record is till 7 February 2024) The average package this year has reached up to 13.13 lakh rupees, although there has been a slight decrease. The highest package offered to students this year is 60 lakh rupees. Major companies offering job offers include Google, Microsoft, Accenture, Siemens, Tata Steel, Tata Motors, Jaguar Motors, and Land Rover, among others.

== Notable alumni ==
- Rabi Narayan Bastia, Padma Shri awardee, geoscientist, known for his contributions in the hydrocarbon explorations at Krishna Godavari Basin
- Vijay Prasad Dimri, Padma Shri awardee, geophysical scientist, known for his contributions in earth sciences
- Harsh Gupta, Padma Shri awardee, earth scientist and seismologist
- Waman Bapuji Metre (1906–1970), Padma Bhushan awardee, pioneer in the Indian oil industry
- Shyam Sundar Rai, seismologist, Shanti Swarup Bhatnagar laureate
- T. C. Rao, Father of Indian Mineral Processing, Founding HOD, Fuel, Mineral and Metallurgical Department (FMME), IIT(ISM) Dhanbad
- Gulshan Lal Tandon, Padma Bhushan awardee, a pioneer in the Indian Mining Industry and former CMD of Coal India.
- Jaswant Singh Gill (1939–2019), Sarvottam Jeevan Raksha Padak awardee, mining engineer at Coal India, known for 1989 Raniganj rescue.

== See also ==
- Indian Institutes of Technology
- Indian Institute of Technology Kharagpur
- Indian Institute of Technology Bombay
- Education in India
