= Rabi Narayan Bastia =

Indian geoscientist (born 1958)

- Born: 2 October 1958 (age 67); Odisha, India
- Occupation: Geoscientist
- Known for: KG-D6 Gas field in Krishna Godavari Basin
- Spouse: Rashmi
- Children: 2
- Awards: Padma Shri; Odisha Living Legend Award; National Mineral Award; ONGC Young Executive Award; AEG Gold Medal; Infraline Service to Nation Award; Ruchi Bharat Gaurav Samman; INSA Young Scientist Award; IBC International Educator of the Year; Oceantex Leadership and Excellence Award

Rabi Narayan Bastia is an Indian geoscientist and the Global Head of Exploration at Lime Petroleum, Norway, known for his contributions in the hydrocarbon explorations at Krishna Godavari Basin (2002), at Mahanadi Basin (2003) and at Cauvery (2007). A non-executive director of Asian Oilfield Services Limited and the President at OilMax Energy, Bastia is a recipient of the Odisha Living Legend Award. The Government of India awarded him the fourth highest civilian honour of the Padma Shri, in 2007, for his contributions to Science and Technology.

== Biography ==
Bastia was born on 2 October 1958 in Odisha, India, and graduated in Science from Utkal University. His master's degree came in Applied Geology from the Indian Institute of Technology, Kharagpur which was followed by a doctoral degree (PhD) in Structural Geology from the same institution. Later, he completed an advanced master's course (MS) in petroleum exploration at the Norwegian University of Science and Technology, with a first rank. His career started at the Oil and Natural Gas Corporation (ONGC) in 1980 and he worked there for 16 years till he joined Reliance Industries (RIL) in 1996 where he founded and headed the exploration and production (E&P) Division. He led the RIL exploration team at Krishna Godavari Basin and discovered the KG-D6 field in 2002, reportedly the biggest Natural gas find worldwide in the year 2002. He worked with RIL till 2012 during which time the team led by him was successful in discovering gas at Mahanadi basin of the Northeast coast in 2003 and at Cauvery basin in 2007.

In 2012, he resigned from RIL, under controversial circumstances, reportedly due to the decline in the output from the KG-D6. By that time, he had already been associated with Lime Petroleum, Norway for two years, as a director, where he is the Global Head of Exploration. He is the President of E&P business at OilMax Energy, a Pune-based project management consultants in the energy sector, concurrently serving Asian Oilfield Services as a non-executive independent director and Hibiscus Petroleum Bernhad, Malaysia as a director, resigning from the latter board in 2014. He also sits in the director boards of Oil Field Instrumentation India Limited and Synergy Oil and Gas Consultancy Pvt Ltd. In 2005, he was elected as the chairman of the International Quality and Productivity Centre (IQPC), the first Indian to hold the post. He is a member of American Association of Petroleum Geologists and the Society of Exploration Geophysicists and Petroleum Engineers. He is also a member of the Society of Geoscientists and Allied Technologists, Indian Geological Congress and the Association of Petroleum Geologists of India.

Bastia is the author of Geologic Settings and Petroleum Systems of India's East Coast Offshore Basins : Concepts and Applications, a text on exploration of hydrocarbons in Indian coast. Besides, he has published over fifty articles in peer reviewed national and international journals and serves as a visiting professor at many universities. He has also mentored four students in their doctoral research and has delivered keynote addresses at several international conferences including the Petromin Deepwater Conference at Malaysia and the SEAPEX Conference at Singapore.

Bastia is married to Rashmi and the couple has two sons.

== Awards and honours ==
Bastia was awarded the degree of Doctor of Science (DSc) by the Indian School of Mines, Dhanbad, his thesis validated by Alberta University and the University of Oklahoma. This was the first instance a scientist in India receiving the honour for petroleum research. In 1990, the Indian National Science Academy awarded him their Young Scientist Award. While working at the Oil and Natural Gas Commission, he received three institutional awards between 1993 and 1995, including the Young Executive Award. The Geological Society of India awarded him the National Mineral Award in 2003 and the Government of India followed it up, three years later, with civilian honour of the Padma Shri in 2007; a year earlier, he had received the Gold Medal of the Association of Exploration Geophysicists. The year 2007 brought him two more awards viz. Infraline Service to Nation Award and Ruchi Bharat Gaurav Samman of the Government of Odisha. He was featured in the Who's Who in the World of the American Continental Research in its 2008 edition and the International Biographical Centre listed him among the top 100 educators of the world in 2009. He is also a recipient of the Oceantex Leadership and Excellence Award (2010) and the Odisha Living Legend Award (2011).

== See also ==
- Krishna Godavari Basin
- Reliance Industries
- Upstream (petroleum industry)
