= Mission Raniganj =

2023 Indian film by Tinu Suresh Desai

- Theatrical release poster
- Directed by: Tinu Suresh Desai
- Screenplay by: Vipul K Rawal
- Dialogues by: Deepak Kingrani
- Story by: Deepak Kingrani (story); Poonam Gill (idea)
- Produced by: Vashu Bhagnani; Deepshikha Deshmukh; Jackky Bhagnani; Ajay Kapoor
- Starring: Akshay Kumar; Parineeti Chopra
- Narrated by: Sharad Kelkar
- Cinematography: Aseem Mishra
- Edited by: Aarif Sheikh
- Music by: Songs: Satinder Sartaaj; Prem-Hardeep; Arko; Vishal Mishra; Gaurav Chatterji; Background Score: Sandeep Shirodkar
- Production companies: Pooja Entertainment; AK Productions
- Distributed by: PVR Inox Pictures
- Release date: 6 October 2023
- Running time: 134 minutes
- Country: India
- Language: Hindi
- Budget: ₹55 crore
- Box office: est. ₹45.66 crore

Mission Raniganj: The Great Bharat Rescue is a 2023 Indian Hindi-language disaster thriller film directed by Tinu Suresh Desai and produced by Pooja Entertainment. Based on the Raniganj Coalfields collapse of 1989 in West Bengal, the film stars Akshay Kumar and Parineeti Chopra. Mission Raniganj is based on Jaswant Singh Gill, a brave and diligent mining engineer from IIT Dhanbad who rescued 65 trapped miners at the Raniganj Coalfields in 1989.

Principal photography took place from July 2022 to August 2023 in the United Kingdom, Raniganj, Jharkhand and Mumbai. The film was theatrically released on 6 October 2023. It received mixed reviews from critics and was a box office flop.

== Plot ==
In 1989, miners are undergoing a shift change around midnight in Raniganj Coalfields. The mine is divided into three sections, and a blast is set off in one of the sections to open new coal veins. Upon the blast, it is noticed that the shaft is leaking water. An emergency order is sent out to evacuate, but the Behra (deaf) section is led by a deaf miner who doesn't hear the phone signal. Most of the 200+ miners are evacuated except for all 60+ miners in the Behra section and 6 miners who drown trying to escape the mines. Jaswant Singh Gill is a manager of a nearby mine who notices the emergency vehicles headed for the mine and decides to lend his services. Upon arrival he encounters stiff resistance from other members of the operation who believe that all the miners are already dead and a rescue is futile. The head of the flooded mine, Ujjwal, requests his help in the rescue operation. Gill recruits a disgraced surveyor, Tapan Ghosh and a drilling engineer, Bindal, to scope the highest point of the mine. From here, he excavates an 8-inch borehole, placing a flashlight as a signal to the miners. However, unbeknownst to them, the miners are stuck behind a brick wall obstructing the path to the highest point, and do not see the flashlight. Meanwhile, Sen from Coal India is sent to sabotage the mission, as the manager of Raniganj Coalfields, Ujjwal, is intensely disliked by his boss. He proposes rescuing the miners through a closed mineshaft which had been breached by the explosion, disregarding Gill’s warning that the shaft is heavily flooded and cannot be accessed. His crew uncovers the bodies of 6 miners who drowned, causing the rescue crew to abandon the mission and shut down operations. The flashlight is withdrawn just before the miners reach the highest point. However, the dog of one of the miners hears the miners' desperate cries and barks at Gill, alerting him that the miners are still alive and the rescue should be continued.

After Sen's attempt fails, the efforts focus on Gill. The 8-inch borehole allows for food, water, and medicines to be sent down to the mine, along with a communications line. Through a Davy lamp, the miners discover that the shaft is being filled with carbon dioxide gas, which along with the water is creeping towards them. Gill devises a 29-inch wide capsule which can be used to pull the miners up one at a time from a larger borehole. To ruin this attempt, Sen has key pieces removed from the crane he brought in, preventing the miners from being speedily rescued. Gill deduces that the miners only have 48 hours before their oxygen supply runs out. With no alternative, they begin manually winching each miner out. Most of the miners are rescued, but in a critical phase, oxygen runs low and they realize they cannot save everyone manually. Govardhan, the local MLA and union leader, attacks Sen until he admits to deliberately ruining the crane. Under pressure, he has the crane fixed and brought to the mine. Gill appears to black out from lack of oxygen, but despite losing his metal hammer, uses his kaṛā to signal the capsule to be lifted. Gill is the last to be removed from the minefields, and is rewarded with a Rs. 1 lakh cheque and immediate promotion. The disgraced surveyor is recognized for his efforts and paid his missing wages.

== Cast ==
The cast is listed below:

- Akshay Kumar as Jaswant Singh Gill
- Parineeti Chopra as Nirdosh Kaur Gill
- Kumud Mishra as R.K. Ujjwal
- Pavan Malhotra as T.P. Bindal
- Ravi Kishan as Bhola Raut
- Gaurav Prateek as Diwakar
- Varun Badola as Shaligram
- Dibyendu Bhattacharya as D Sen
- Dinesh Lamba as Kaseem
- Rajesh Sharma as Govardhan Roy (MLA)
- Virendra Saxena as Tapan Ghosh (surveyor)
- Vipul K. Rawal as Middle-aged officer
- Saanand Verma as Timepass man
- Shishir Sharma as Om Prakash Dayal
- Ananth Mahadevan as Coal India Chairman Natarajan (based on Dr. M. P. Narayanan)
- Arif Zakaria as DG Om Chakravarti
- Aparna Upadhyay as Bankelal’s mother
- Jameel Khan as Pasu
- Sudhir Pandey as Anand "Behra" Pandey
- Bachan Pachera as Noor
- Ishtiyak Khan as Gopal Jha
- Mukesh Bhatt as Murli
- Omkar Das Manikpuri as Bishu
- Sharad Kelkar as Narrator (voice)

== Production ==
=== Development ===
The film was announced by Vashu Bhagnani, Jackky Bhagnani and Deepshikha Deshmukh under their banner Pooja Entertainment. It is based on the life of Jaswant Singh Gill who rescued 65 mine workers during the Raniganj Coalfields collapse of 1989 in West Bengal.

The film was initially titled Capsule Gill, which was later changed to The Great Indian Rescue. In September 2023, with the poster release, the name was changed to Mission Raniganj: The Great Bharat Rescue.

=== Casting ===
Akshay Kumar was cast as the mining engineer Jaswant Singh Gill an IIT Dhanbad Graduate. Parineeti Chopra was cast opposite Kumar, marking their second project after Kesari. Actor Dibyendu Bhattacharya was cast in a pivotal role in August 2022.

=== Filming ===
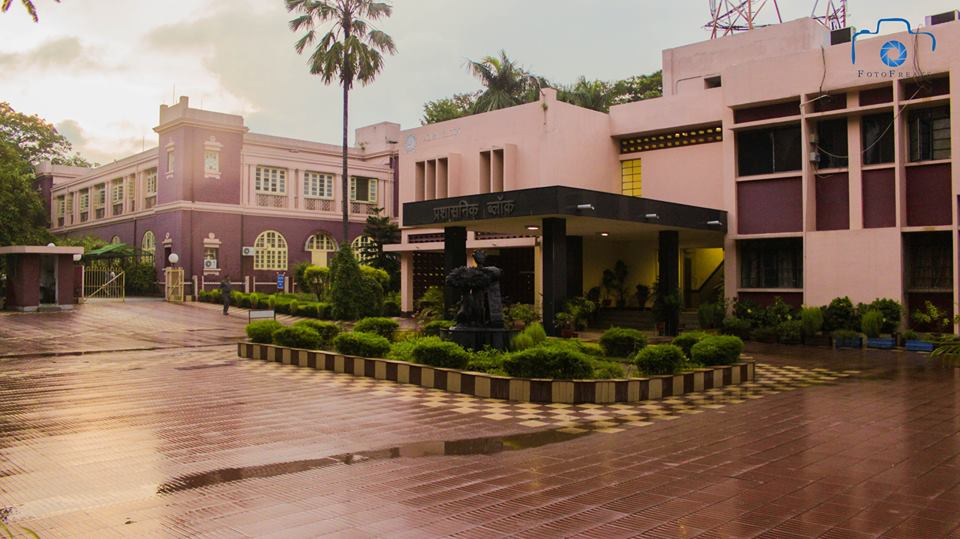
IIT Dhanbad was one of the primary locations for filming.

The principal photography commenced in July 2022, with Akshay Kumar. Parineeti Chopra and other actors joined the set in August 2022. The film is primarily shot in the United Kingdom with few portion also shot in Raniganj, IIT Dhanbad Campus and Mumbai. In August 2023, a song was shot in Mumbai.

== Soundtrack ==
Mission Raniganj

Soundtrack album by Satinder Sartaaj, Prem-Hardeep, Arko, Vishal Mishra and Gaurav Chatterji
- Released: 27 September 2023
- Recorded: 2022
- Genre: Feature film soundtrack
- Length: 127 minutes
- Language: Hindi
- Label: Jjust Music

The music of the film is composed by Satinder Sartaaj, Prem-Hardeep, Arko, Vishal Mishra and Gaurav Chatterji while all the lyrics are written by Sartaaj, Kumar Vishwas and Kaushal Kishore.

The first song from the film "Jalsa 2.0" was released on 16 September 2023. It is sung by Satinder Sartaaj and Prem-Hardeep. The second song titled "Keemti" was released on 3 October 2023. It is sung by Kaushal Kishore and Vishal Mishra.

Track listing
No.	Title	Lyrics	Music	Singer(s)	Length
1.	"Jalsa 2.0"	Satinder Sartaaj	Satinder Sartaaj, Prem-Hardeep	Satinder Sartaaj, Prem-Hardeep	3:16
2.	"Jeetenge"	Kumar Vishwas	Arko	Arko, B Praak	3:52
3.	"Jeetenge" (Reprise)	Kumar Vishwas	Arko	Arko, Stebin Ben	3:52
4.	"Keemti"	Kaushal Kishore	Vishal Mishra	Kaushal Kishore, Vishal Mishra	2:46
5.	"Nanak Naam Jahaaz Hai"	Traditional	Gaurav Chatterji	Gaurav Chatterji, Jatinder Singh, Hansika Pareek	1:30
Total length:					15:16

== Release ==
=== Theatrical ===
Mission Raniganj's teaser of the film was released on 7 September 2023. The film's trailer was released on 25 September 2023. The film was theatrically released on 6 October 2023.

=== Home media ===
The film began streaming on Netflix from 1 December 2023.

== Reception ==
=== Critical reception ===
Mission Raniganj received mixed reviews from critics and audiences. On the review aggregator website Rotten Tomatoes, 29% of 7 critics' reviews are positive, with an average rating of 4.5/10.

Toshiro Agarwal of Times Now rated the film 4 stars out of 5 and wrote "The film's gripping narrative, exceptional performances, and skilful direction make it a must-watch, despite some visual effects shortcomings. It's a gritty and grounded tale of heroism and resilience" A critic of Bollywood Hungama gave the film 3.5 out of 5 stars and noted, "On the whole, Mission Raniganj makes an impact due to the subject, clap worthy moments in the second half, nail-biting moments and Akshay Kumar’s performance. The director cinematography is fine but the first half is a bit weak and doesn’t create the desired impact." Sonil Dedhiya of News18 rated the film 3 stars out of 5 and wrote "It is a story of human triumph which has been narrated well. It is an engaging experience that will resonate emotionally with the audience."

Renuka Vyavahare of The Times of India gave the film 2.5 out of 5 stars and noted, "Mission Raniganj with all its potential to tap into the human psyche and behaviour when put in a life-threatening situation, misses the goal by a mile. With a poor attempt to scratch beneath the surface, director Tinu Suresh Desai’s film is loud, over the top melodramatic, largely evoking indifference over reverence." Zinia Bandyopadhyay of India Today gave the film 2.5 out of 5 stars and wrote "Overall, if you are looking for just entertainment, you will probably enjoy the film. But, if you want to see the extraordinary story of Gill on-screen, you will be disappointed."

Shubhra Gupta of The Indian Express gave the film 1.5 out of 5 stars and wrote "the way in which the loud background music ratchets up the theatrics, and the manner in which local ‘netas’ and high officials in Calcutta try and scuttle the operation, with each person bearing the bad news running across the screen in exactly the same manner, the film comes off a tiresome plod." Saibal Chatterjee of NDTV gave the film 1.5 out of 5 stars and wrote "The film reinforces the lingering belief that Hindi cinema should leave true stories alone, especially if Akshay Kumar is to be placed at the centre of the action."

=== Box office ===
Mission Raniganj was made on a budget of ₹55 crore, and collected ₹45.66 crore, by the end of its theatrical run. The film was termed a box office flop.
