= F. W. Sharpley =

Prof Forbes Wilmot Sharpley FRSE MIEE (1897–1965) was a 20th-century Irish-born electrical engineer who became an expert on low-lighting levels and their impact on the human eye.

== Life ==
He was born in Dublin on 7 January 1897 the son of Forbes Sharpley. They lived at Sandymount Road in the Pembroke district. He was educated in Dublin and Edinburgh then studied Engineering at the University of London graduating BSc in 1918.

In 1926 (aged only 29) he was made Professor of Mechanical and Electrical Engineering at the Indian School of Mines in Dhanbad in India.

In 1927 he was elected a Fellow of the Royal Society of Edinburgh. His proposers were Francis Gibson Baily, Robert Campbell, John Horne and Sir William Wright Smith.

He left India in 1946 shortly before it received independence from Great Britain and returned to England. In 1948 became he became Head of the Electrical Section of the National Coal Board Central Research Establishment in Cheltenham.

He retired in 1962 and died on 6 October 1965.

== Family ==
In 1922 he married Kathleen Maria Kirkwood daughter of Alexander Kirkwood. They had no children.

== Publications ==
- Vision and Illumination in Coal Mines (1938)
- The Normal Visual Field of the Dark-Adapted Eye (1946)
- Chemical Engineering in the Coal Industry (1956)
