= Gulshan Lal Tandon =

Indian Mining Industry pioneer

- Died: 2 August 2012
- Occupations: Chairman, Coal India Limited
- Years active: 1950–2012
- Awards: Padma Bhushan (1986)

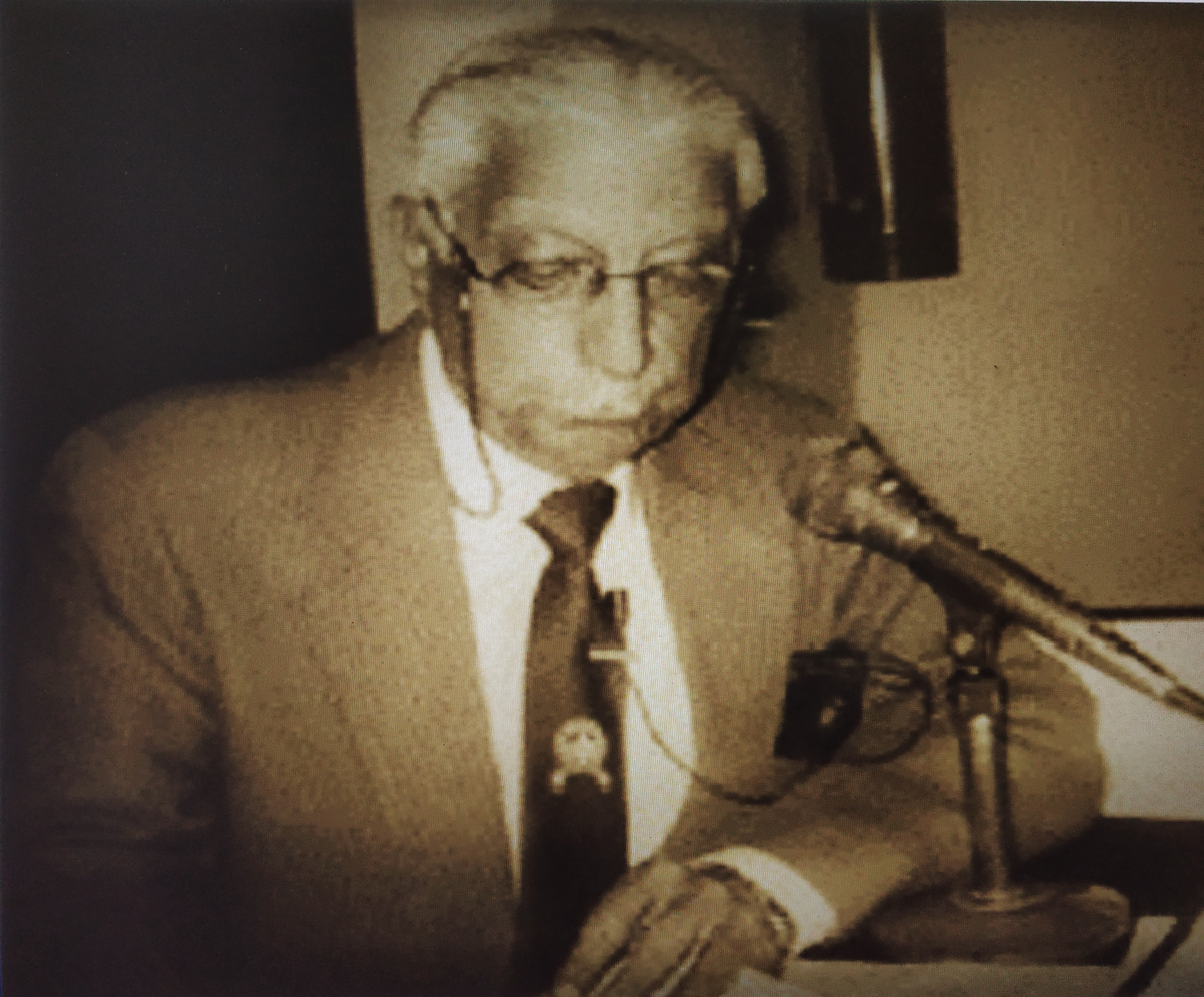
Gulshan Lal Tandon during a meeting in his office.

Gulshan Lal Tandon was a pioneer in the Indian mining industry. Tandon was the former chairman of Coal India and played a major role in the establishment of Coal India. Tandon received the Padma Bhushan, India's third highest civilian honour, in 1986 for his services to Indian mining industry. He died on 2 August 2012.

== Career ==
Gulshan Lal Tandon received his B Tech degree in mining from the Indian School of Mines, Dhanbad in 1951. He served as the chairman of Neyveli Lignite Corporation and Coal India. Tandon was the convenor of the Ministry of Industry for evaluating public sector undertakings in the mineral and power sectors. He has been director of several companies like Sharda Motor Industries, Indian Metals & Ferro Alloys, VBC Industries and Tanishq Consultancy among others.

== Awards ==
- Padma Bhushan – 1986,
- Sir Jahangir Gandhy Gold Medal from Tata's XLRI,
- Best Manager & Best Managed Company from FICCI and AIEO,
- Bheeshma Pitamah & Field Marshal in Mining by I B C & KIOCL Association,
- Udyog Ratan from Institute of Economic Studies in 1984,
- NMDC Gold Medal,
- Best Management & Profitable Company from National Productivity Council,
- All prestigious Awards of MGMI,
- Engineering Personality of the Country – 1994.
