= Department of Management Studies & Industrial Engineering, IIT (ISM) Dhanbad =

Business school of IIT, Dhanbad, India

Department of Management Studies & Industrial Engineering, IIT (ISM), Dhanbad
- Motto: उत्तिष्ठत जाग्रत प्राप्य वरान्निबोधत Uttitishthat Jagrat Prapya Varannibhodhat
- Motto in English: Arise, Awake, strive for the highest and be in the fight
- Established: 1977
- Parent institution: Indian Institute of Technology (Indian School of Mines), Dhanbad
- Head of the Department: Dr. Sandeep Mondal
- Students: 180+ (MBA + Ph.D.)
- Location: Dhanbad, Jharkhand, India; 23.812°N 86.440°E
- Website: www.iitism.ac.in/management-studies-and-industrial-engineering/

The Department of Management Studies & Industrial Engineering, IIT (ISM) Dhanbad is the business school of Indian Institute of Technology (Indian School of Mines), Dhanbad which was established in 1977. The department admits students on the basis of Common Admission Test (CAT). Recently it fetched 29th position in NIRF 2020 rankings introduced by the MHRD.

== Programmes offered ==
=== Undergraduate ===
The department runs minor courses for UG Students of other disciplines in the subjects of:

1. Financial management
2. Operations management
3. Marketing management
4. Human Resource management

=== Postgraduate ===
The department offers the following courses for PG Students:

1. Master of Business Administration (MBA) (Duration: 2 years)(Intake-62)
2. MBA in Business analytics ( Intake-30)
3. Master of Technology in Industrial Engineering and Management (Duration: 2 years)
4. Executive MBA (extended program) (Duration: 3 years)

[Note: Since 2019, new admission for Executive MBA has been put on hold till further notice.]

The department also offers Doctoral programmes for candidates.

== Laboratories ==
The department has four laboratories:

- Human engineering laboratory
- Work study laboratory
- Systems laboratory
- Psychology laboratory

== Industrial Interaction ==
The department has taken part in consultancy projects of various organisations and has also offered Executive Development Programmes to several business houses and organisations. Some of the Industry partners/clients of the department include: The World Bank, CIMFR, BSNL, NCL, Coal India Limited, etcetera.

== Research activities ==
The department has a large number of sponsored research projects funded by several agencies. Some of the organisations entrusting projects to the department are AICTE, MHRD, Hindustan Zinc Limited, ICSSR, UGC, CMPDIL, World Bank, CIL, etcetera.
