= Sukumar Mishra =

Indian electrical engineer and academician

- Education: National Institute of Technology, Rourkela
- Awards: IEEE Fellow; Samanta Chandra Shekhar Award; NASI‑Reliance Platinum Jubilee Award
- Scientific career
- Fields: Electrical engineering, Power systems, Smart grid, Renewable energy
- Workplaces: Indian Institute of Technology Delhi; Indian Institute of Technology (Indian School of Mines)
- Website: abudhabi.iitd.ac.in/smishra

Sukumar Mishra is an Indian electrical engineer and academician, currently working as the Director of Indian Institute of Technology (Indian School of Mines), Dhanbad. Before joining his current position, he was a professor in the Department of Electrical Engineering of the Indian Institute of Technology Delhi, where he had been a faculty member for about two decades.

== Education and career ==
He completed his M.Tech and Ph.D. in electrical engineering from the National Institute of Technology Rourkela (formerly Regional Engineering College), in 1992 and 2000, respectively.

He was at IIT Delhi where he was Associate Dean (R&D) from March 2020 and also took care of administrative assignments such as Dean of Research & External Engagement at the IIT Delhi Abu Dhabi campus.

== Research contributions ==
Prof. Mishra’s research specializes in power systems, power quality, smart grid, renewable energy, and electric vehicle charging infrastructure.

== Awards and honours ==
- Fellow, IEEE (2025)
- Hingorani Award for Excellence in Solar Photovoltaic Systems (2024)
- NASI‑Reliance Platinum Jubilee Award (2019)
- IETE - Bimal Bose Award (2019)
- Samanta Chandra Shekhar Award (2016)
- INAE Silver Jubilee Young Engineer Award (2012)
- INSA Medal for Young Scientist (2002)

== Selected Bibliography ==
=== Articles ===
- Mishra, S.; Bhende, C. N.; Panigrahi, B. K. (January 2008). "Detection and Classification of Power Quality Disturbances Using S-Transform and Probabilistic Neural Network". IEEE Transactions on Power Delivery. 23 (1): 280–287. doi:10.1109/TPWRD.2007.911125.
- Jindal, Anish; Dua, Amit; Kaur, Kuljeet; Singh, Mukesh; Kumar, Neeraj; Mishra, S. (June 2016). "Decision Tree and SVM-Based Data Analytics for Theft Detection in Smart Grid". IEEE Transactions on Industrial Informatics. 12 (3): 1005–1016. doi:10.1109/TII.2016.2543145.
- Mishra, S. (February 2005). "A Hybrid Least Square-Fuzzy Bacterial Foraging Strategy for Harmonic Estimation". IEEE Transactions on Evolutionary Computation. 9 (1): 61–73. doi:10.1109/TEVC.2004.840144.
- Saikia, Lalit Chandra; Nanda, J.; Mishra, S. (March 2011). "Performance comparison of several classical controllers in AGC for multi-area interconnected thermal system". International Journal of Electrical Power & Energy Systems. 33 (3): 394–401. doi:10.1016/j.ijepes.2010.08.036.
- Bhende, C. N.; Mishra, S.; Malla, Siva Ganesh (October 2011). "Permanent Magnet Synchronous Generator-Based Standalone Wind Energy Supply System". IEEE Transactions on Sustainable Energy. 2 (4): 361–373. doi:10.1109/TSTE.2011.2159253.

=== Books ===
- Panda, Gayadhar; Naayagi, R. T.; Mishra, Sukumar (24 March 2022). Sustainable Energy and Technological Advancements: Proceedings of ISSETA 2021. Springer Nature. ISBN 978-981-16-9033-4.
