= ABD Maestro =

Indian liquor company

- Type: Privately held company
- Industry: Alcobev
- Founded: 2025 in Mumbai, Maharashtra, India
- Headquarters: Mumbai, India
- Key people: Ranveer Singh (Co-Founder, Creative and Business Partner); Bikram Basu (Vice Chairman)
- Website: abdmaestro.com

ABD Maestro is an Indian liquor company and subsidiary of Allied Blenders and Distillers Ltd. focused on the super-premium and luxury spirits headquartered in Mumbai, Maharashtra, India. It was incorporated in April 2025 by Bollywood actor Ranveer Singh, a co-founder and creative partner in the company.

== History ==
ABD Maestro Pvt. Ltd., was incorporated in April 2025 and is headquartered in Mumbai With Ranveer Singh as a co-founder. It is the Subsidiary of Allied Blenders and Distillers Ltd. one of the largest India spirits companies founded by Kishore Rajaram Chhabria in 1988 in Kolkata.

In 2024, Allied Blenders and Distillers entered the Gin category with the launch of Zoya Special Batch Gin, made with Juniper and twelve fine botanicals as part of a new premium brands division. The same year, the company partnered with Roust Corporation to distribute Russian Standard Vodka in India. In November 2024, it launched ARTHAUS Blended Malt Scotch Whisky marking its entry into the luxury segment.

In February 2025, ABD acquired Fullarton Distilleries, whose brands like Woodburns Contemporary India Whisky, Pumori Small Batch Gin, and Segredo Aldeia subsequently become part of the ABD Maestro portfolio.

In November 2025, the company launched RANGEELA Contemporary Indian Vodka, a triple-distilled vodka. In December 2025, the company introduced ‘YELLO Designer Whisky’, a blend of Scotch and Indian malts and ‘AODH Irish Whiskey’ produced using a signature triple distillation process.

In December 2025, ABD Maestro entered a distribution agreement with Ospree Duty Free available at Mumbai International Airport with plans to expand across all Ospree outlets in India. Further, the brand is also seen at other major duty-free channels in India like Delhi Duty Free and Avolta in Bangalore.

In February 2026, the company launched "The Collective Limited Edition", a 34-year-old Speyside Single Malt distilled at The Macallan distillery, Scotland, The release was limited to 60 hand-filled, individually numbered decanters priced at ₹11 lakhs for 700ml in Maharashtra.

In June 2026 the company launched Zoya Pink Mix Berries Gin, an extension of the Zoya range.

== Growth & expansion ==
Since its launch, ABD Maestro were present across the following states including Maharashtra, Goa, Haryana, West Bengal, Uttar Pradesh, Karnataka, Delhi, Chandigarh, Punjab and Daman.

In June 2026, the company expanded the launch of the following brands namely AODH Irish Whiskey, Woodburns Contemporary Indian Whisky, Yello Designer Whisky, and Rangeela Contemporary India Vodka in Odisha.

In July 2026, the company launched its whisky brands—AODH Irish, WOODBURNS Contemporary, and YELLO Designer in Telangana state.

=== Bar Maestro ===
In June 2026, ABD Maestro introduced its IP called "Bar Maestro", a multi-city bartending competition in partnership with beverage education platform "Tulleeho".

== Notable brands ==
ABD Maestro manufactures Indian whisky, Scotch whisky, rum, vodka, and gin.

Whisky

- Arthaus Blended Malt Scotch Whisky
- Woodburns Contemporary Indian Whisky
- Yellow Designer Whisky
- Aodh Irish Whisky
- The Collective Limited Edition Scotch Whisky

Vodka

- Russian Standard Vodka
- Rangeela Contemporary Indian Vodka

Gin

- Zoya Special Batch Gin
- Zoya Watermelon Gin
- Zoya Espresso Coffee Gin
- Zoya Pink Mix Berries Gin
- Pumori Small Batch Gin
- Pumori Small Batch Pink Gin

Rum

- Segredo Aldeia White Rum
- Segredo Aldeia Cafe Rum

== Awards ==
- ABD Maestro's Woodburns contemporary India Whisky won is the First ever Indian brand to win the Revelation Blended Whisky Award and Grand Gold at 27th Spirits Selection by Concours Mondial de Bruxelles (CMB) 2025, one of the world's largest blind-tasted spirits competitions
- ABD Maestro won three gold at London Spirits Competition 2026
- Arthaus Blended Malt Scotch Whisky won Campaign Innovator of the Year and ABD Maestro won ‘Distiller of the Year’ award at Icons of Whisky 2026
