= Tinu Suresh Desai =

Indian film director (born 1974)

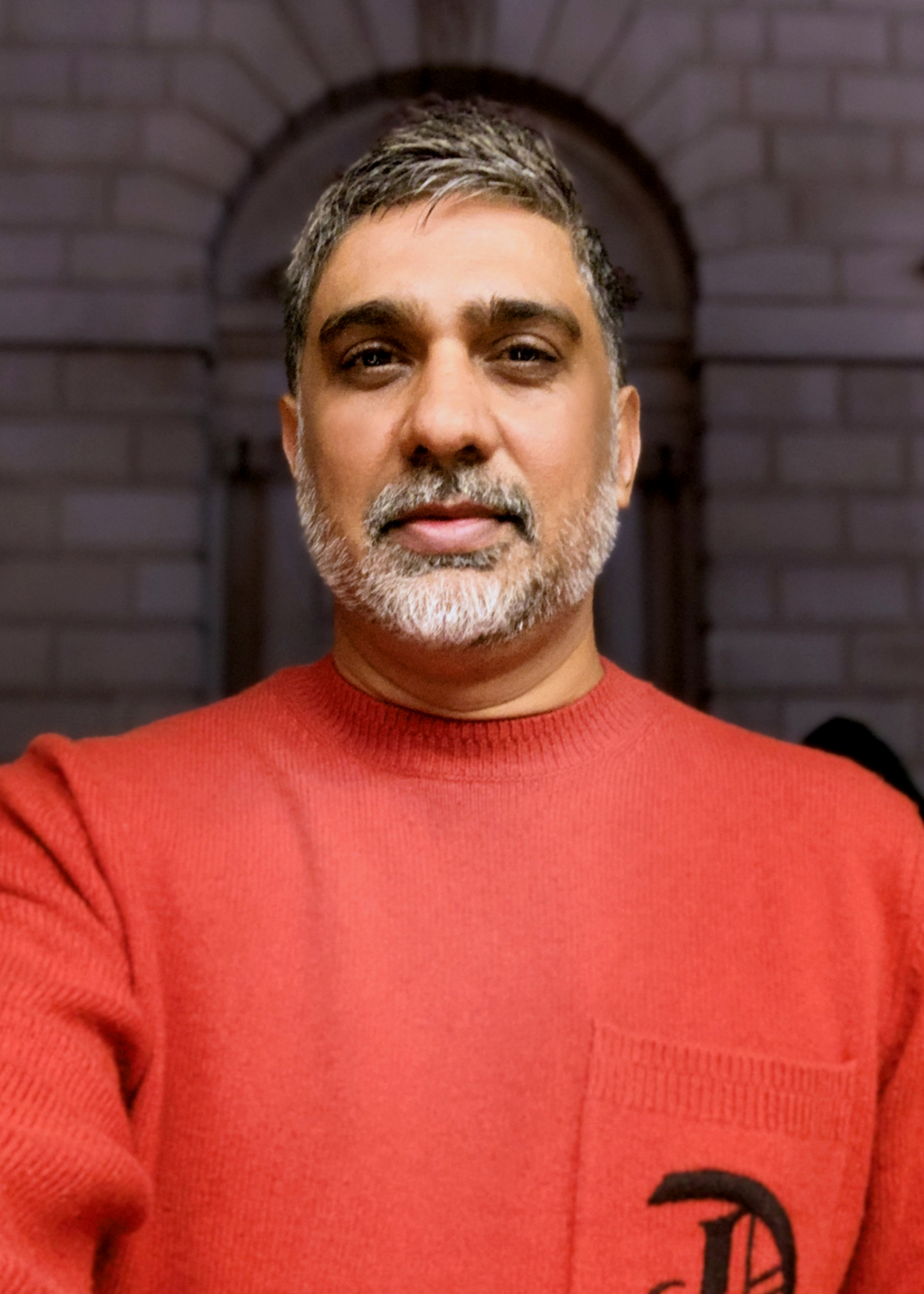
- Desai in 2022
- Born: Dharmendra Suresh Desai; 28 August 1974 (age 52); Mumbai, Maharashtra, India
- Other name: Tinu
- Education: Mithibai College, Mumbai
- Occupation: Film director
- Known for: Rustom, Mission Raniganj, Special 26
- Awards: Star Screen and ETC Bollywood Business

Dharmendra "Tinu" Suresh Desai (born 28 August 1974) is an Indian film director. Tinu Suresh Desai was born on 28 August 1974 in Mumbai Maharashtra, India in a Gujarati-speaking family, his birth name is Dharmendra. He is a son of production manager Suresh Desai, who is known for films like Sholay, Shaan and Seeta aur Geeta. Tinu Desai has started his career in the film industry as assistant director with 1997 film Zameer: The Awakening of a Soul, later he worked as the chief assistant and associate director for films like Arjun Pandit, Anari No. 1 and Players. In 2016, Desai made his directorial debut with 1920 London starring Sharman Joshi and Meera Chopra.

Tinu Desai is known for the Akshay Kumar starrer film Rustom released in 2016, was reportedly based on K. M. Nanavati v. State of Maharashtra's 1959 court case. The film featured Ileana D'Cruz, Arjan Bajwa, and Esha Gupta. In 2016, he was felicitated with Star Screen Award and ETC Bollywood Business Awards 2016 "Most Promising Debut Director" for Rustom. Akshay Kumar won his 1st National Film Award for Rustom.

Tinu Desai has directed Mission Raniganj, a Akshay Kumar & Parineeti Chopra Starrer film based on the chief mining engineer Jaswant Singh Gill, who evacuated 65 miners trapped in a flooded coal mine in Raniganj, West Bengal, in 1989.

== Filmography ==
Year	Film	Director	Writer	Other	Notes	Ref.
1997	Zameer: The Awakening of a Soul			Chief Assistant Director		
1999	Anari No. 1			Assistant Director		
1999	Arjun Pandit			Assistant Director		
2001	Dil Ne Phir Yaad Kiya			Chief Assistant Director		
2004	Rog Judaayian	Yes			Short film	
2008	God Tussi Great Ho			First Assistant Director		
2009	Life Partner			First Assistant Director		
2010	Shaapit			First Assistant Director		
2011	Tere Mere Phere			Chief Assistant Director		
2012	Players			Associate Director		
2013	Special 26			First Assistant Director		
2016	1920: London	Yes			Directorial debut	
2016	Rustom	Yes				
2023	Mission Raniganj	Yes				

== Awards and achievements ==
Year	Awards	Category	Work	Result	Ref.
2016	Star Screen Award	Most Promising Debut Director	Rustom	Won	
2016	ETC Bollywood Business Awards	100 Carore Club Director	Rustom	Won	

== See also ==
- List of Indian film directors
- List of people from Gujarat
- Screen Award for Best Director
- ETC Bollywood Business Awards
