= Ranveer Singh =

Indian actor (born 1985)

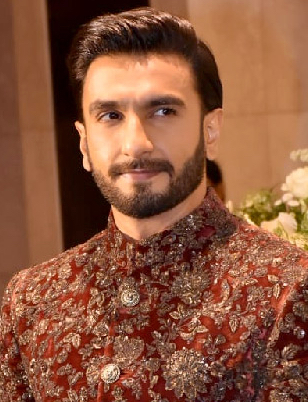
- Singh in 2023
- Born: Ranveer Singh Bhavnani; 6 July 1985 (age 41); Bombay, Maharashtra, India
- Education: Indiana University Bloomington
- Occupation: Actor
- Years active: 2010–present
- Works: Full list
- Spouse: Deepika Padukone (m. 2018)
- Children: 2
- Family: Burke-Singh family
- Awards: Full list

Ranveer Singh Bhavnani (Sindhi pronunciation: [ɾəɳʋiːɾ sɪŋɡʱ bʱɑːʋnɑːɳiː]; born 6 July 1985) is an Indian actor who predominantly works in Hindi films. Known for his work in a variety of genres, he has received several accolades, including five Filmfare Awards. Singh is among India's highest-paid actors and has been featured in Forbes India's Celebrity 100 list since 2012.

After graduating from Indiana University Bloomington, he made his acting debut with a leading role in Yash Raj Films' romantic comedy Band Baaja Baaraat (2010), winning the Filmfare Award for Best Male Debut. He gained praise for playing a melancholic thief in the drama Lootera (2013) and established himself as a leading actor through his multiple period dramas with Sanjay Leela Bhansali that included Goliyon Ki Raasleela Ram-Leela (2013), Bajirao Mastani (2015), and Padmaavat (2018). Singh received widespread critical acclaim for his portrayals of Peshwa Bajirao I and Sultan Alauddin Khalji in the last two, winning the Filmfare Award for Best Actor and the Filmfare Critics Award for Best Actor respectively.

He achieved further commercial success with the titular role in the action film Simmba (2018), which he later reprised in Rohit Shetty's Cop Universe. Singh received two further Filmfare Best Actor Awards for his performances in the musical drama Gully Boy (2019) and the sports film 83 (2021). Following a brief period of career fluctuations, he returned to commercial success with the romantic comedy Rocky Aur Rani Kii Prem Kahaani (2023). He achieved his greatest commercial success with the Dhurandhar Duology, comprising the spy thrillers Dhurandhar (2025) and Dhurandhar: The Revenge (2026), both of which rank among the five highest-grossing Indian films.

In addition to films, he is a prominent endorser for several brands and products. He also ventured into music, contributing to the soundtrack of Gully Boy. Off-screen, he is known for his flamboyant fashion sense. In April 2025, he incorporated ABD Maestro, a liquor company. He is married to his frequent co-star Deepika Padukone, with whom he has two daughters.

== Early life and background ==
Ranveer Singh Bhavnani was born on 6 July 1985 into a Hindu Sindhi family in Bombay (now Mumbai), Maharashtra to Anju and Jagjit Singh Bhavnani. He has an elder sister, Ritika Bhavnani. His grandparents moved to Bombay from Karachi, Sindh (in present-day Pakistan) during the partition of India. His paternal grandfather was Sunder Singh Bhavnani and his paternal grandmother was actress Chand Burke, who was born into a Punjabi Christian family and was the sister of diplomat and writer Samuel Martin Burke, active in Pakistan following independence.

Singh explains that he dropped his surname Bhavnani, since he felt that the name would have been "too long, too many syllables", thus downplaying his brand as a "saleable commodity". Singh's mother's cousin, Sunita Kapoor (née Bhavnani), is married to actor Anil Kapoor. Singh always aspired to be an actor, participating in several school plays and debates. However, after he joined H.R. College of Commerce and Economics in Mumbai, Singh realised that getting a break in the film industry was not easy. Feeling that the idea of acting was "too far-fetched", Singh focused on creative writing. He went to the United States where he received his Bachelor of Arts degree in Telecommunications from Indiana University Bloomington in 2008. At the university, he decided to take acting classes and took up theatre as his minor.

After completing his studies and returning to Mumbai in 2007, Singh worked for a few years in advertising as a copywriter, with agencies like O&M and J. Walter Thompson. He also worked as an assistant director but left it to pursue acting. He then decided to send his portfolio to directors. He would go for all kinds of auditions, but did not get any good opportunities, while only getting calls for minor roles: "Everything was so bleak. It was very frustrating. There were times I would think whether I was doing the right thing or not."

== Career ==
=== Early work and breakthrough (2010–2014) ===
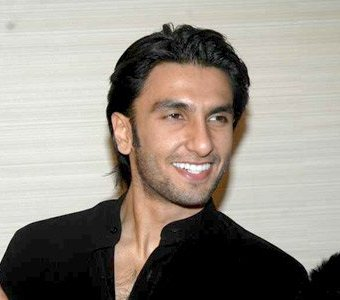
Singh at a promotional event for Band Baaja Baaraat in 2010

In 2010, Singh auditioned for a lead role in Maneesh Sharma's Band Baaja Baaraat, a romantic comedy from the production company Yash Raj Films. Impressed by his audition, producer Aditya Chopra cast him for the part opposite Anushka Sharma. Singh described his role of Bittoo Sharma as a typical Delhi boy. To prepare for the role, he spent time with students at the Delhi University campus. Despite reservations about the film's commercial appeal from trade journalists, the film emerged as a sleeper hit. Singh's performance was praised, with Anupama Chopra of NDTV writing that Singh was "pitch perfect in the role of the uncouth but good-hearted small town slacker". At the annual Filmfare Awards, Singh won the award for Best Male Debut.

Following Band Baaja Baaraat, Singh signed on for Ladies vs Ricky Bahl (2011), a romantic comedy once again produced by Chopra, directed by Maneesh Sharma, and co-starring Anushka Sharma. He played a conman Ricky Bahl who cons girls for a living but finally meets his match. According to Singh, the title character had various avatars in the film, including a chirpy, entertaining side and a sinister side. Nikhat Kazmi of The Times of India wrote, "Ranveer is, well Ranveer: your average Joe kind of hero who looks convincing enough as Sunny, Deven, Iqbal, Ricky, his sundry avatars." Singh received critical acclaim for Vikramaditya Motwane's period romance Lootera (2013), co-starring Sonakshi Sinha. An adaptation of O. Henry's short story "The Last Leaf", the film tells the story of Pakhi Roy Chowdhury, a young Bengali woman who falls in love with Varun Shrivastava, a conman posing as an archaeologist. Rajeev Masand of CNN-IBN wrote that Singh "brings a quiet sensitivity to Varun, and occasionally a smoldering intensity. Offering a finely internalized performance, he leaves a lasting impression." Ladies vs Ricky Bahl emerged a box office success, while Lootera underperformed commercially.

Singh next starred opposite Deepika Padukone in Sanjay Leela Bhansali's adaptation of William Shakespeare's Romeo and Juliet, titled Goliyon Ki Raasleela Ram-Leela (2013), in which he played Ram, a Gujarati boy based on the character of Romeo. Bhansali was impressed by Singh's performance in Band Baaja Baaraat and decided to cast him for the film. Goliyon Ki Raasleela Ram-Leela generated positive reviews from critics, as did Singh's performance. Writing for India Today, Rohit Khilnani wrote that the film proved that he would be a star. The film emerged as Singh's biggest commercial success, with worldwide revenues of ₹202 crore (US$22 million). Singh received a nomination for the Filmfare Award for Best Actor.

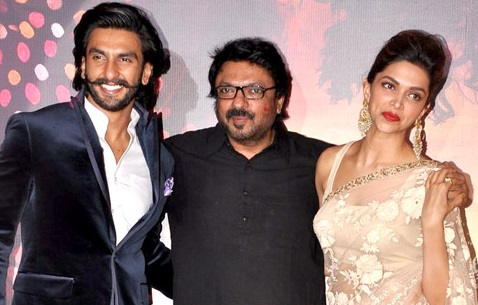
Singh with Deepika Padukone and Sanjay Leela Bhansali at an event for Goliyon Ki Raasleela Ram-Leela in 2013

In 2014, Singh starred as a Bengali criminal in Ali Abbas Zafar's Gunday, alongside Arjun Kapoor, Priyanka Chopra and Irrfan Khan. David Chute of Variety praised Singh's screen presence and wrote that he "tucks the movie's center of interest under his arm and takes it with him — even though he has the could-be-thankless "good brother" role". Also, Singh's chemistry with Kapoor was considered by critic Rohit Khilnani to the prime asset of the film. Gunday proved to be Singh's biggest box office opener, and eventually emerged a box-office success with a revenue of ₹100 crore (US$11 million) worldwide. After a cameo appearance in Finding Fanny, Singh starred as a gangster in Shaad Ali's crime drama Kill Dil opposite Parineeti Chopra and Ali Zafar which was a critical and commercial failure.

=== Established actor (2015–2019) ===
Zoya Akhtar's ensemble comedy-drama Dil Dhadakne Do (2015), produced by and cameo-starring her brother Farhan Akhtar, featured Singh alongside Anil Kapoor, Shefali Shah and Priyanka Chopra as the younger sibling of a dysfunctional Punjabi business family who aspires to become a pilot. Writing for Mumbai Mirror, Kunal Guha found Singh to be the "surprise element" of the film; he praised his "immaculate comic timing" and took note of his subtlety. Commercially, the film underperformed. He next reunited with Bhansali in the period romance Bajirao Mastani (2015), opposite Padukone and Chopra. He portrayed Bajirao I, for which he shaved his head and to prepare, he locked himself in a hotel room for 21 days. Raja Sen wrote that Singh "brings his character to life and does so with both machismo and grace", and commended him for his perfecting his character's gait and accent. The film earned ₹350 crore (US$37 million) to become one of the highest-grossing Indian films, and garnered Singh the Filmfare Award for Best Actor.

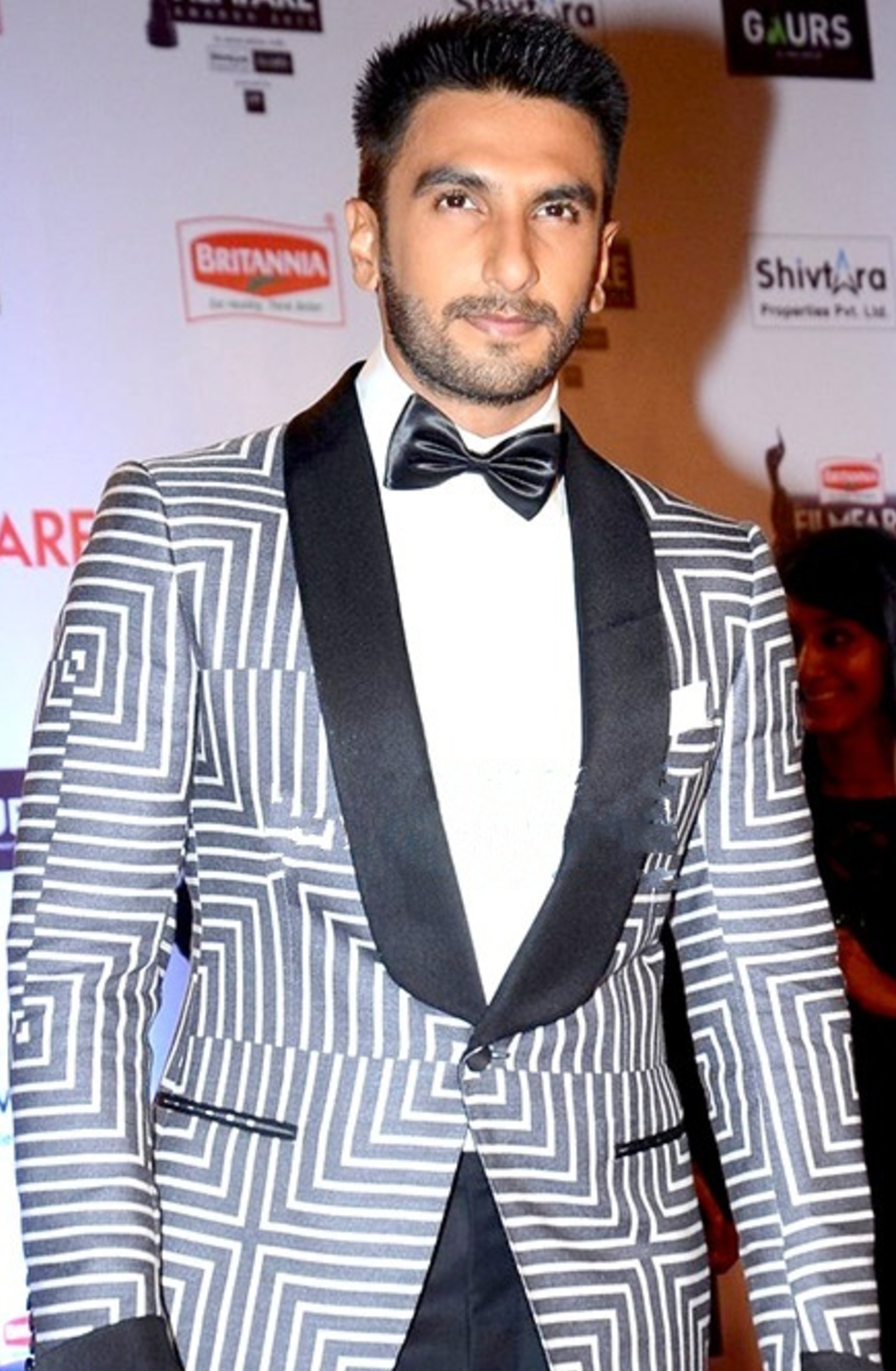
Singh at the 61st Filmfare Awards ceremony, where he won the Best Actor award for portraying Bajirao I in Bajirao Mastani (2015)

In 2016, Singh starred in Aditya Chopra's comedy-romance Befikre opposite Vaani Kapoor. He played Dharam Gulati, a stand-up comic whose romantic liaisons with Kapoor's character leads to conflict between them. Set in Paris, Befikre marked the fourth project to be directed by Chopra. Singh performed a nude scene for it, a rare occurrence in an Indian film. Jay Weissberg of Variety found the film to be an "overly energetic twist on the old friends with benefits theme" and criticised Singh's "manic behavior". It underperformed at the box office.

After a year-long absence from the screen, Singh portrayed Alauddin Khilji, as a ruthless Muslim king, in Sanjay Leela Bhansali's period drama Padmaavat (2018), co-starring Deepika Padukone and Shahid Kapoor, which marked his third collaboration with Bhansali and Padukone. Right-wing Hindu groups speculated that the film distorted historical facts and issued violent threats against the cast and crew. The film's release was deferred and was allowed for exhibition after several modifications were made to it. Ankur Pathak of HuffPost criticised the film's misogynistic and regressive themes, but praised Singh for his "astute brilliance" in depicting Khilji's bisexuality. Rajeev Masand opined that he "plays the part with the sort of grotesque flamboyance that makes it hard to look at anyone or anything else when he's on the screen". Padmaavat's production budget of ₹200 crore (US$21 million) made it the most expensive Hindi film ever made at that time. With a worldwide gross of over ₹570 crore (US$61 million), it became Singh's highest-grossing release and among India cinema's biggest grossers. He won the Filmfare Critics Award for Best Actor (shared with Ayushmann Khurrana for Andhadhun) and gained a Best Actor nomination at the ceremony.

At the end of the same year, Singh played the titular corrupt policeman in Rohit Shetty's action comedy Simmba, based on the Telugu film Temper (2015), co-starring Sara Ali Khan and Sonu Sood, which marked his first collaboration with filmmaker Karan Johar, who co-produced the film with Shetty. Despite disliking the film, Uday Bhatia of Mint credited Singh for playing his "cardboard creation" of a character with an "underlying sweetness that renders it more winsome than the humorless masculinity of Devgn's Singham". With worldwide earnings of ₹400 crore (US$43 million), Simmba emerged as Singh's second top-earning Indian film of 2018.

Singh reteamed with Zoya Akhtar on Gully Boy (2019), a musical inspired by the life of the street rappers Divine and Naezy. Singh found little in common with his character of a poor man who aspires to become a rapper, and in preparation he underwent acting workshops and spent time with both Divine and Naezy. He performed his own rap songs and was pleased that the film brought attention to India's underground music scene. The film premiered at the 69th Berlin International Film Festival. Deborah Young of The Hollywood Reporter commended him for displaying a "pleasingly full emotional range that extends to drama and hip-hop" and writing for Film Companion, Baradwaj Rangan praised his ghetto accent and found his understated performance to be a "superb show reel for his range". Gully Boy won a record 13 Filmfare Awards, and Singh received another Best Actor award.

=== Career fluctuations and Dhurandhar (2020–present) ===
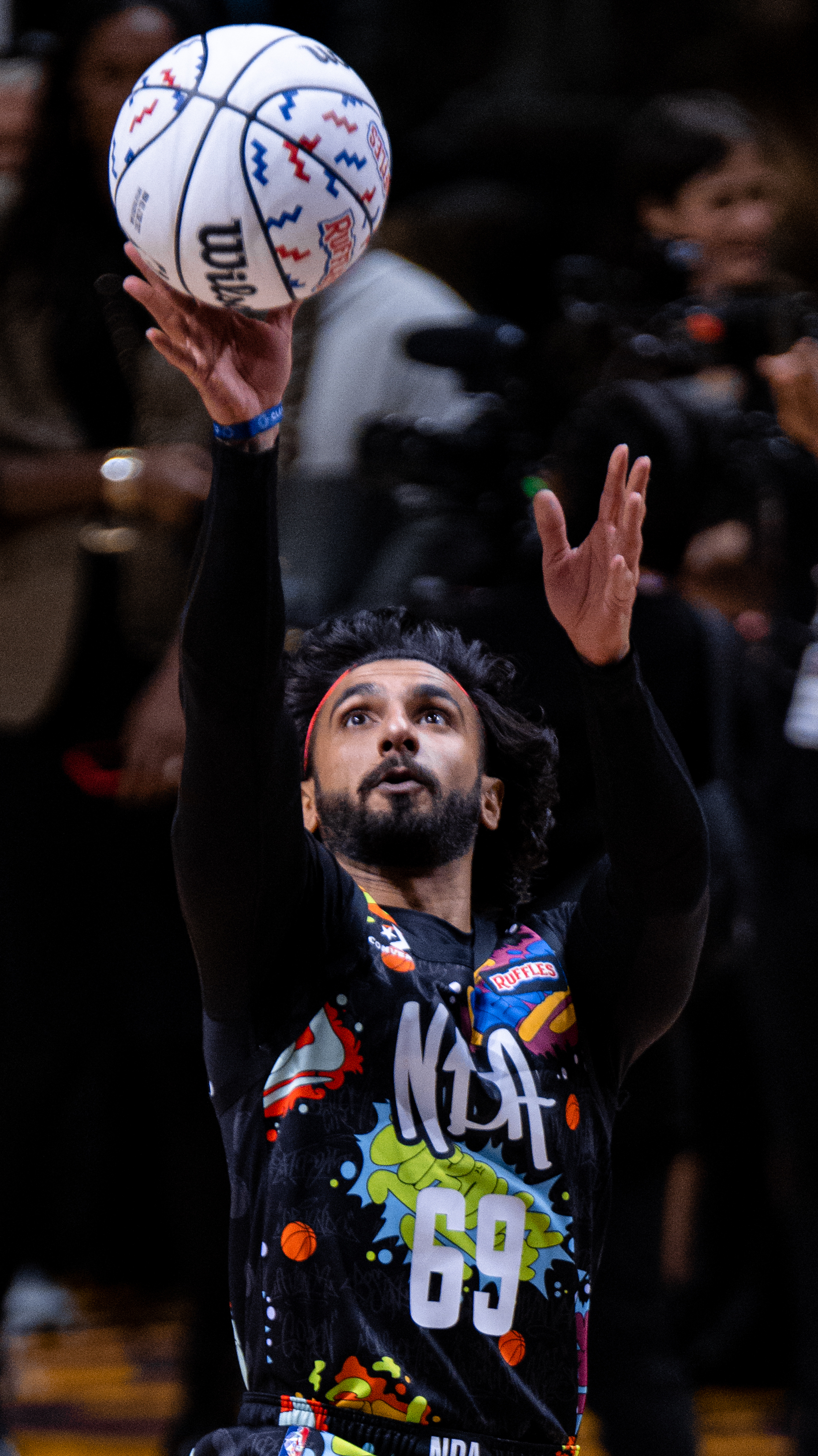
Singh in 2022

In 2021, Singh hosted the television game show The Big Picture, which aired on Colors TV. He reprised his role as Simmba in Shetty's action film Sooryavanshi in an extended cameo. The film emerged as the year's highest grossing film. Singh then portrayed cricketer Kapil Dev in Kabir Khan's 83, a sports film based on the 1983 Cricket World Cup. Initially planned for a 2020 release, 83 was delayed several times owing to casting and pre-production that postponed filming, and later due to the COVID-19 pandemic in India. Reviews for the film were positive, with praise for Singh's portrayal of Dev. The film failed to recoup its large ₹270 crore (US$29 million) investment. Singh's performance won him his third Filmfare Award for Best Actor.

Singh's first film release of 2022 was Jayeshbhai Jordaar, a satire about female infanticide in India. Anna M.M. Vetticad of Firstpost disliked the film but commended him for "transform[ing] his body, body language and demeanour, his posture, his walk, his gestures and his entire personality" for the part, similar to how he had "metamorphosed" to play Dev in 83. Following this, both he and Varun Sharma played dual roles of identical pairs of twin brothers separated at birth in Shetty's ensemble comedy Cirkus (2022), a remake of the 1982 film Angoor, which was based on William Shakespeare's play Comedy of Errors. In a scathing review, Nandini Ramnath of Scroll.in dismissed Singh's performance as "consistently lacklustre". Both Jayeshbhai Jordar and Cirkus were commercially unsuccessful.

In 2023, Singh starred in Karan Johar's romantic comedy Rocky Aur Rani Kii Prem Kahaani, opposite Alia Bhatt. Johar based the character of Rocky on gym rat influencers from West Delhi; in preparation, Singh spent time with one such influencer named Yuvraj Dua, learning his dialect and mannerisms. He also trained in Kathak for a sequence in which he had to dance to "Dola Re Dola". Mayank Shekhar believed that he "owns this role like nothing short of an inimitable rock-star", while Anupama Chopra wrote that he "combines the charm offensive with moments of vulnerability and tears with great aplomb". Earning over ₹350 crore (US$37 million) worldwide, it emerged as one of the year's highest-grossing Hindi films. He received another Best Actor nomination at Filmfare. Singh once again played Simmba in Shetty's action sequel Singham Again (2024), alongside an ensemble cast. Despite disliking the film, NDTV's Saibal Chatterjee considered Singh to be its "brightest spark" and commended his comic timing. Singham Again had modest box-office returns on its high production budget.

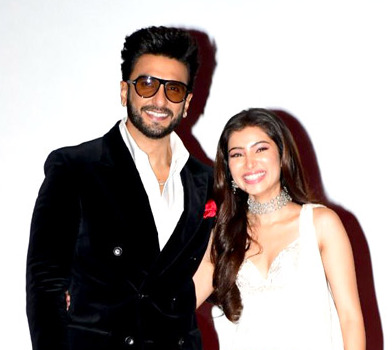
Singh with co-star Sara Arjun at the trailer launch for Dhurandhar in 2025

Singh headlined the Dhurandhar Duology, comprising the spy action thrillers Dhurandhar (2025) and Dhurandhar: The Revenge (2026), directed by Aditya Dhar. Set against the backdrop of major events such as the Indian Airlines Flight 814 hijacking, the 2001 Indian Parliament attack, and the 2008 Mumbai attacks, he portrayed an undercover intelligence operative stationed in Pakistan under a false identity. With runtimes of 214 and 229 minutes respectively, the films are among the longest Indian productions ever made. In a mixed review of the first instalment for The Hindu, Anuj Kumar praised Singh's physical transformation but felt that his "bravura and brooding intensity" became monotonous over the extended runtime, particularly when sharing scenes with co-star Akshaye Khanna's "charismatic presence". Reviewing the second instalment, Shomini Sen of WION noted that while the first film relegated Singh to the periphery, Dhurandhar: The Revenge afforded him greater prominence, allowing him to "hold the attention from start to finish" with "one of the most raw performances of his career", though she ultimately considered the film a downgrade from its predecessor. Against expectations, both films achieved record-breaking box office success, with both ranking among Indian cinema's top five highest-earners. Dhurandhar grossed over ₹1,300 crore (US$140 million) worldwide, becoming the highest-grossing Indian film of 2025, while Dhurandhar: The Revenge surpassed ₹1,900 crore (US$200 million) to become the highest-grossing Indian film of 2026.

Singh will next appear in the action thriller Pralay alongside Kalyani Priyadarshan.

== Personal life ==
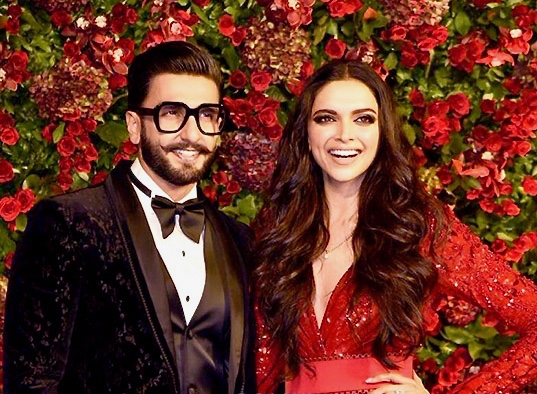
Singh and Padukone at their wedding reception in 2018

Singh began dating Deepika Padukone, his co-star in Goliyon Ki Raasleela Ram-Leela, in August 2012. In October 2018, the couple announced their impending marriage. The following month, they married in both traditional Konkani Hindu ritual and Sikh Anand Karaj ritual. Both the ceremonies were held at Lake Como, Italy. On 8 September 2024, Padukone gave birth to their first daughter. Their second daughter was born on 19 September 2026.

== Media image and reception ==
Assessing Singh's career, movie analyst and trade expert Girish Wankhede, described him as "one of the finest actors of his generation." Reflecting on what Dhurandhar means for the actor's trajectory, Wankhede said: "Dhurandhar has redefined the game, and Ranveer Singh is at the centre of that transformation. This is not a one-film wonder; it is the work of an actor who has poured his heart and soul into the role." Singh has been frequently featured in Rediff.com's annual listing of "Bollywood's Best Actors"; he was ranked first in 2010, fourth in 2015, first in 2019, and 2021, second in 2023, and tenth in 2025.

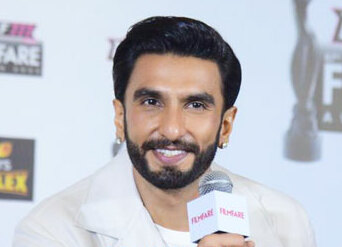
Singh at 67th Filmfare Awards in 2022

Singh has appeared in Forbes India's Celebrity 100 list since 2012, reaching his highest position (seventh) in 2019. That year, the magazine estimated his annual earnings to be ₹118 crore (US$13 million) and ranked him as the fifth-highest-paid actor in the country. He was also featured by GQ in their listing of the 50 most influential young Indians of 2017 and 2019. In 2019, India Today featured him among the nation's 50 most powerful people, and in 2023, he featured in a similar list by The Indian Express.

In addition to his acting career, Singh launched his own record label in 2019, named IncInk, to promote local musicians. He endorses several brands, including Adidas, Head & Shoulders, Ching's, Jack & Jones, Thums Up, and MakeMyTrip. Singh is also an investor in Vineeta Singh's start-up Sugar Cosmetics. Kroll Inc. (formerly Duff & Phelps) estimated his brand value to be US$63 million, in 2019, the fourth-highest of Indian celebrities. In 2022 and 2023, he held the second position, peaking with a brand value of US$203.1 million in the latter year. In 2024, he acquired a 50% stake in Elite Mindset, a packaged foods company. In 2025, a report by Kroll valued his brand at $170.7 million, maintaining his position as India's second most valued celebrity. Additionally, his global presence was noted when he became the first Indian actor to be featured on the cover of a major international sports magazine following the success of Dhurandhar. In 2026, Fortune India ranked him at fifth place on its inaugural Most Valuable Celebrities list, with a brand value of ₹2,077 crore.

Off-screen, Singh is known for his flamboyant fashion sense. In July 2022, Singh appeared nude in a photoshoot for Paper magazine. A month later, he was summoned by Mumbai Police for questioning in connection with several police complaints that were filed against him after the pictures went viral on social media. The image was later used as the cover artwork for the song "Goodbye Evergreen" from Sufjan Stevens's 2023 album Javelin. In December 2023, a life-size, wax figure of him was installed at London and Singapore's Madame Tussauds museums.

== Awards and nominations ==
Singh is the recipient of five Filmfare Awards: Best Male Debut for Band Baaja Baaraat (2010), Best Actor for Bajirao Mastani (2016), Gully Boy (2019), and 83 (2021), and Best Actor (Critics) for Padmaavat (2018).

== See also ==
- List of Indian film actors
