= Ranveer Singh filmography =

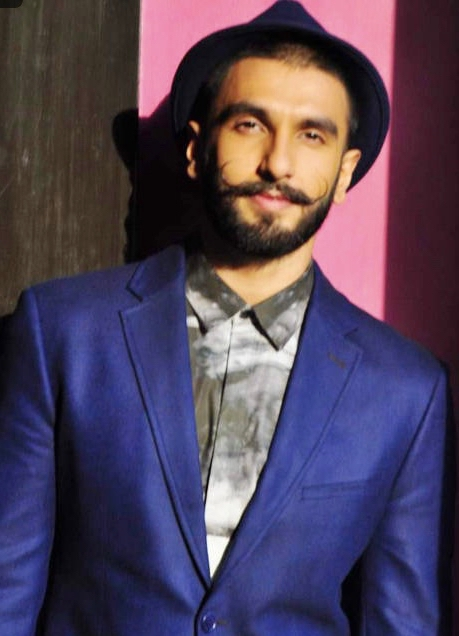
Singh at a promotional event for Bajirao Mastani in 2015

Indian actor Ranveer Singh made his acting debut with Yash Raj Films' romantic comedy Band Baaja Baaraat, opposite Anushka Sharma. He won the Filmfare Award for Best Male Debut for his performance. He then appeared opposite Sharma again the company's Ladies vs Ricky Bahl (2011). In 2013, Singh received critical acclaim for playing a melancholic thief in Lootera, and later on starred in Sanjay Leela Bhansali's romantic drama Goliyon Ki Raasleela Ram-Leela, alongside Deepika Padukone.

In 2014, Singh appeared in the action film Gunday, alongside Arjun Kapoor. In the same year, he appeared in Shaad Ali's directorial Kill Dil, the film was critically panned, however his performance along with the fellow leads were appreciated. In the next year, he starred in Zoya Akhtar's ensemble comedy-drama Dil Dhadakne Do, and portrayed Bajirao I in Bhansali's historical drama Bajirao Mastani. It won Singh Filmfare Award for Best Actor. After the 2016 commercially average film, Befikre directed by Aditya Chopra, he starred in Bhansali's historical drama Padmaavat (2018) as Alauddin Khalji. In the same year, Singh appeared as a corrupt policeman in Rohit Shetty's action film Simmba.

Singh received praise for Zoya Akhtar's 2019 musical drama film Gully Boy. His performance as a rapper inspired by the life stories of rappers Divine and Naezy won him another Filmfare Award for Best Actor.

In 2021, Singh starred in the sports drama film 83. The film was a commercial setback despite positive reviews. It was followed by the film Jayeshbhai Jordaar, the film was rated well by the critics and audiences alike, however due to lack of marketing and fewer footfalls in multiplexes post COVID-19, the movie underperformed at the box office. He then starred in Cirkus, which was both a critical and commercial failure. Singh further on received praise for reprising his role from Simmba in Singham Again, his next film Rocky Aur Rani Kii Prem Kahaani (2023) was fairly successful. He later starred in the Dhurandhar Duology, comprising the spy action blockbusters Dhurandhar (2025) and Dhurandhar: The Revenge (2026), which became his highest-grossing films and broke several box-office records.

== Films ==
Key
†	Denotes films that have not yet been released

Year	Film	Role(s)	Notes	Ref.
2010	Band Baaja Baaraat	Bittoo Sharma		
2011	Ladies vs Ricky Bahl	Ricky Bahl		
2013	Bombay Talkies	Himself	Special appearance in the song "Apna Bombay Talkies"	
2013	Lootera	Varun "Vijay" Shrivastav		
2013	Goliyon Ki Raasleela Ram-Leela	Ram Rajari		
2014	Gunday	Bikram Bose		
2014	Finding Fanny	Gabo Eucharistica	English film; cameo appearance	
2014	Kill Dil	Dev Sharma		
2015	Hey Bro	Himself	Special appearance in the song "Birju"	
2015	Dil Dhadakne Do	Kabir Mehra		
2015	Bajirao Mastani	Peshwa Bajirao I		
2016	Befikre	Dharam Gulati		
2018	Padmaavat	Sultan Alauddin Khilji		
2018	Teefa in Trouble	Himself	Pakistani film; special appearance	
2018	Simmba	Sangram "Simmba" Bhalerao		
2019	Gully Boy	Murad Ahmed		
2020	Ghoomketu	Himself	Cameo appearance	
2021	Sooryavanshi	Sangram "Simmba" Bhalerao	Special appearance	
2021	83	Kapil Dev		
2022	Jayeshbhai Jordaar	Jayeshbhai Jordaar		
2022	Cirkus	Roy Chauhan & Roy Shenoy	Double role	
2023	Rocky Aur Rani Kii Prem Kahaani	Rocky Randhawa		
2024	Singham Again	ACP Sangram "Simmba" Bhalerao		
2025	Dhurandhar	Hamza Ali Mazari / Jaskirat Singh Rangi	Part of the Dhurandhar spy action-thriller duology	
2026	Dhurandhar: The Revenge	Hamza Ali Mazari / Jaskirat Singh Rangi	Part of the Dhurandhar spy action-thriller duology	
2027	Pralay †	TBA	Filming	

== Short films ==
Year	Title	Role(s)	Note(s)	Ref.
2015	All India Bakchod Knockout	Himself		
2016	Ranveer Ching Returns	Ranveer Ching & Maa Ching	Double role	
2018	Captain Ching Rises	Captain Ching		
2022	Made In India	Ranveer Ching		
2025	Agent Ching Attacks	Agent Ching		

== Television ==
Year	Show	Role	Notes	Ref.
2021–2022	The Big Picture	Host	Game show	
2022	Fabulous Lives of Bollywood Wives	Himself	Cameo appearance	
2023	The Romantics	Himself	Documentary series	
2024	Angry Young Men	Himself	Documentary series	
2025	The Ba***ds of Bollywood	Himself	Cameo appearance	

== Music video appearances ==
Year	Title	Note	Ref.
2014	"My Name Is Ranveer Ching"	Ching's Secret	
2023	"Dil Jashn Bole"	2023 Cricket World Cup anthem	

== Discography ==
Year	Title	Album	Composer	Ref.
2011	"Aadat Se Majboor"	Ladies vs Ricky Bahl	Salim–Sulaiman	
2011	"Aadat Se Majboor (Remix)"	Ladies vs Ricky Bahl	Salim–Sulaiman	
2019	"Asli Hip Hop"	Gully Boy	DIVINE, Dub Sharma, Ankur Tewari, Spitfire, Sez on the Beat, Rishi Rich, Karsh Kale	
2019	"Mere Gully Mein"	Gully Boy	DIVINE, Dub Sharma, Ankur Tewari, Spitfire, Sez on the Beat, Rishi Rich, Karsh Kale	
2019	"Doori Poem"	Gully Boy	DIVINE, Dub Sharma, Ankur Tewari, Spitfire, Sez on the Beat, Rishi Rich, Karsh Kale	
2019	"Doori"	Gully Boy	DIVINE, Dub Sharma, Ankur Tewari, Spitfire, Sez on the Beat, Rishi Rich, Karsh Kale	
2019	"Kab Se Kab Tak"	Gully Boy	DIVINE, Dub Sharma, Ankur Tewari, Spitfire, Sez on the Beat, Rishi Rich, Karsh Kale	
2019	"Ek Hee Raasta"	Gully Boy	DIVINE, Dub Sharma, Ankur Tewari, Spitfire, Sez on the Beat, Rishi Rich, Karsh Kale	
2019	"Apna Time Aayega"	Gully Boy	DIVINE, Dub Sharma, Ankur Tewari, Spitfire, Sez on the Beat, Rishi Rich, Karsh Kale	
2023	"What Jhumka?"	Rocky Aur Rani Kii Prem Kahaani	Pritam, Madan Mohan	
