= Krishna Godavari Basin =

Oilfield in India

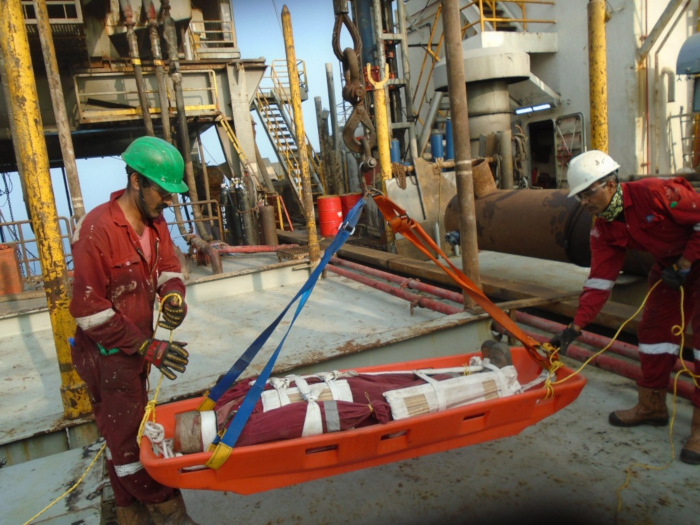
Workers at an oil platform in the Krishna Godavari Basin during Exercise Prasthan 2021.

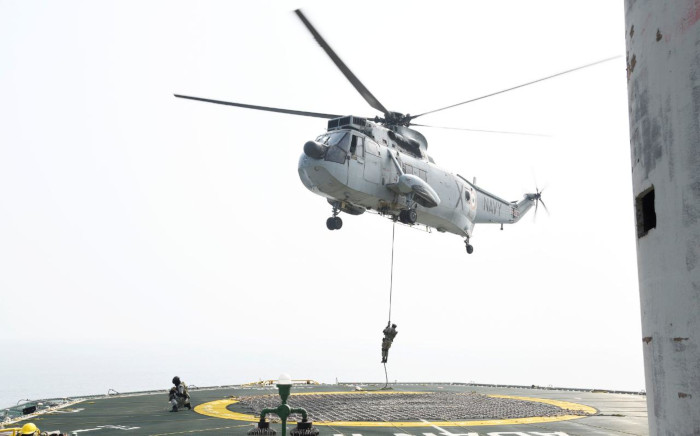
MARCOS descend from a helicopter onto an oil platform in the Krishna Godavari Basin during Exercise Prasthan 2021.

Krishna Godavari Basin is a peri-cratonic passive margin basin in India. It is spread across more than 50,000 square kilometres in the Krishna River and Godavari River basins in Andhra Pradesh. The site is known for the D-6 block where Reliance Industries discovered the biggest natural gas reserves in India in 2003.

== Discoveries ==
The first gas discovery in the basin was in 1983, in Razole Well No 1, when ONGC had a small office in Rajahmundry and Narsapur. Since that discovery Reliance and others have joined the exploration effort.

- 14 trillion cubic feet (0.4 trillion cubic metre) of gas by Reliance Industries in KG-DWN-98/l (KG-D6) in 2006. 1,800 metre (6,000 feet) below the sea floor.
- 20 trillion cubic feet (5.7×10^{11} m^{3}) of gas by Gujarat State Petroleum Corporation in June 2005. The initial reserves estimate was reduced by 90% in a field development plan commissioned by GSPC in 2009.
- Potentially 20 trillion cubic feet (5.7×10^{11} m^{3}) of gas in place at D-3 and D-9 blocks, as estimated in May 2011. According to Reliance Industries: "This includes identified prospects and leads and a number of postulated prospects based on the play area and field size distribution."
- A gas discovery by ONGC in June 2009, which an anonymous company official said could have an estimated 10 trillion cubic feet (2.8×10^{11} m^{3}).

== Tight oil and gas reserves ==
KG inland and offshore basins have good prospects of unconventional tight oil and tight gas reserves from the conducted field studies. Most of the conventional wells drilled and operated have a shorter lifespan than envisaged life and with erratic production. This may be due to drilling of conventional wells in tight oil and gas fields without horizontal drilling in the shale rock formations and hydraulic fracturing.

== Ecology ==
The basin is home to olive ridley sea turtle, a vulnerable species.

== Projects ==
KG-DWN-98/1 (KG-D6) - 8100 km^{2}. The total project is expected to cost $100 billion. 50 km off the coast of Kakinada.

== CAG audit ==
The Reliance Industries Limited (RIL) was supposed to relinquish 25% of the total area outside the discoveries in 2004 and 2005, as per the Production Sharing Contract (PSC). However, the entire block was declared as a discovery area and RIL was allowed to retain it. In 2011, the Comptroller and Auditor General of India (CAG) criticised the Oil Ministry for this decision. The CAG also faulted RIL for limiting the competition in contracts, stating that RIL awarded a $1.1 billion contract to Aker on a single-bid basis.

In May 2014, ONGC alleged that Reliance was illegally extracting gas from blocks owned by ONGC in Krishna Godavari Basin.

== Gas pricing ==
The Indian government fixed the natural gas price at producer end (on shore point) as US$5.61 per million British thermal units ($19.1/MWh) on net calorific value (NCV) basis compared to earlier price of $4.2 per million British thermal units ($14/MWh) on gross calorific value basis. However the enhanced price would be applicable only after compensating the shortfall gas in the previous years for the KG basin fields which are under exploration and production contract by Reliance Industries Ltd. The earlier price of $4.2 per million British thermal units ($14/MWh) on gross calorific value (GCV) basis is calculated already at maximum price cap of Brent crude at $60 per barrel ($380/m^{3}) under the applicable formula linking the price of gas per million Btu (GP) to the price of oil:

GP = 2.5 + (OP – 25) ^0.15

where OP is the annual average Brent crude price for the previous FY, with a floor of $25 per barrel ($160/m^{3}) and a cap of $60 per barrel ($380/m^{3}). As the annual Brent price has always been above the cap price since 2007, the revised gas price at $5.61 per million British thermal units ($19.1/MWh) during the year 2014 is in excess of the applicable price by nearly 20%.

== See also ==
- East West Gas Pipeline (India)
- Deccan Traps
