= ETC Bollywood Business =

ETC
- Country: India
- Broadcast area: Asia Pacific
- Headquarters: Zee Entertainment Enterprises Ltd,7B Shah Industrial Estate, Off. Veera Desai Road, Andheri West; Mumbai – 400053 India

Programming
- Language(s): Hindi & English
- Picture format: 720 (SDTV); 576 (HDTV)

Ownership
- Owner: Zee Entertainment Enterprises Ltd

History
- Launched: 1999

Links
- Website: www.etc.in

ETC Bollywood Business Channel is a Bollywood trade television channel. The channel intended audience is in the Asia Pacific region and it has shows that are hosted in English and Hindi. The channel features reviews, previews, box office collections, details of new and upcoming releases, trade speculations of Hindi films. Talks with Bollywood actors, trade pundits, directors, producers, distributors and film marketers etc. Well known film critic, Komal Nahta stepped into film critic Taran Adarsh's shoes as a host of one of the most prominent shows of the channel, B Biz Reviews in April 2010.

ETC is an India-based satellite television channel based in Mumbai, Maharashtra, ETC was a 24-hour Indian Music Channel.

Zee Network was founded by Subhash Chandra and was launched in India on 1 October 1992.

== Network slogans ==
- 'It's all about Bollywood – Movies, Music, Masala'
- 'The Business of Bollywood'
