= Sarvottam Jeevan Raksha Padak =

- Ribbon of the medal
- Type: Civilian Lifesaving award
- Description: ₹200,000 cash award lump-sum monetary allowance
- Country: India
- Presented by: Government of India
- Ribbon: Red with blue edges and a thin central green stripe
- Obverse: Open hand
- Reverse: Emblem of India
- Established: 30 September 1961
- First award: 1961
- Final award: 2019

Precedence
- Next (higher): Padma Shri
- Next (lower): Uttam Yudh Seva Medal

The Sarvottam Jeevan Raksha Padak (Ultimate Life Saving Medal) is a civilian lifesaving award presented by the Government of India. Established on 30 September 1961, the award was originally called the Jeevan Raksha Padak, Class I.

== Criteria ==
The Sarvottam Jeevan Raksha Padak is awarded to civilians to reward saving lives from drowning, fire, or mine accidents. It is awarded; "for conspicuous courage under circumstances of very great danger to the life of the rescue."

The Sarvottam Jeevan Raksha Padak may be awarded to members of the armed forces, police, or fire services when recognizable acts take place outside beyond the course of their duty. Subsequent awards are recognized by the addition of a medal bar to the ribbon. The medal may be awarded posthumously.

== Appearance ==
The Sarvottam Jeevan Raksha Padak is a circular gold medal 58 mm (2.3 in) in diameter. On the obverse in the centre is an open hand in the Abhayamudra pose with Ma Bhaya above and Sarvottam Jeevan Rakash Padak below in Devanagri script. The reverse bears the Emblem of India and the motto Satyameva Jayate.

The ribbon of the medal is red, 32 mm (1.3 in) wide. At the edges are light blue stripes and a single green centre stripe of green. These colors are meant to represent fire (red), water (blue), and life (green).
