= Sudip Sharma =

Indian screenwriter

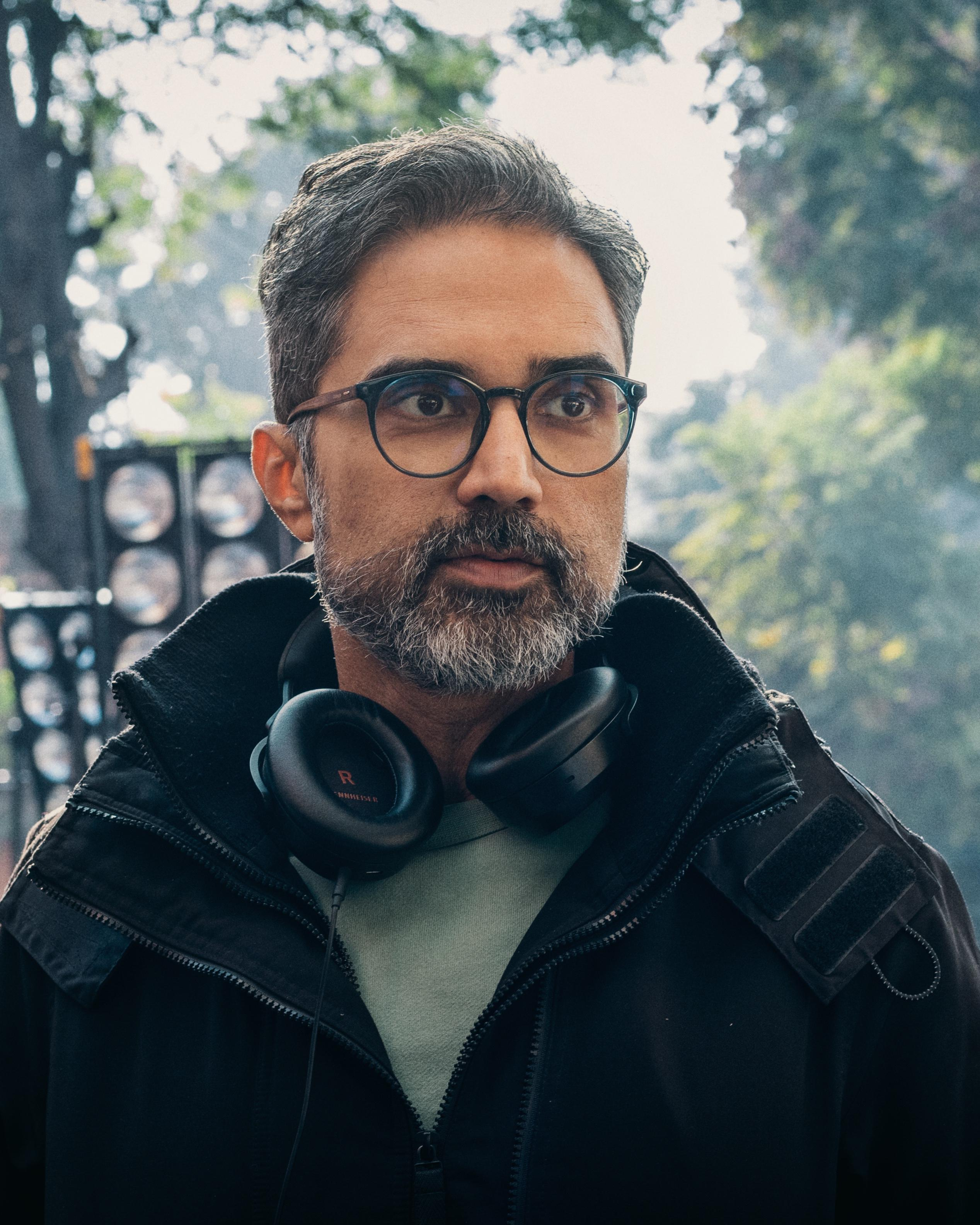
- Sudip Sharma in 2025
- Born: Guwahati, Assam, India
- Occupations: Screenwriter; producer
- Years active: 2008-present

Sudip Sharma is a leading Indian showrunner, writer, director, and producer. He is best known as the creator, writer and executive producer of Paatal Lok and Kohrra.

== Early life ==
Sharma was born in Guwahati and studied there till the 10th grade before moving to Delhi to pursue further education. In 2002, upon receiving his MBA from IIM-Ahmedabad, Sharma relocated to Mumbai and began working with corporate giants in the FMCG sector.

Sharma decided to pursue screenwriting after writing a short film in 2006. He spent the next six years learning about the business, understanding the nuances of scriptwriting, and fine-tuning his craft. During this time, he collaborated with other writers and worked on feature films such as the drama Superstar, directed by Rohit Jugraj and starring Kunal Khemu, which Sharma co-wrote with Rahul Singh. Sharma continued his collaboration with Singh on Semshook. Directed by Siddharth Anand Kumar, Semshook narrated the story of a Tibetan boy born in exile in India who decides to return to his homeland. The film travelled to international film festivals like Cinequest Film Festival and Santa Cruz Film Festival and was also nominated for Best Screenplay at the New York Indian Film Festival.

== Career ==
Sharma made his feature screenwriting debut with the thriller NH10, which was inspired by real-life honour killing cases, and narrated the story of a young couple whose road trip goes awry after an encounter with a group of criminals. Directed by Navdeep Singh, and starring Anushka Sharma, NH10 was co-produced by Clean Slate Films, Phantom Films, and Eros International. Sudip subsequently wrote the dialogues for Singh's next feature, Laal Kaptaan, a historical action-adventure.

Sharma has frequently collaborated with director Abhishek Chaubey, writing the dialogue and screenplay for Chaubey's crime drama Udta Punjab which revolves around the culture of rampant drug abuse and the various conspiracies surrounding it, particularly in the Indian state of Punjab. The film featured an ensemble cast including Shahid Kapoor, Alia Bhatt, Kareena Kapoor, and Diljit Dosanjh and was critically and commercially lauded. Sharma proceeded to write the dialogues and screenplay for Chaubey's next feature Sonchiriya, a slow-burn dacoit Western set in the Chambal valley. The film was produced by RSVP and headlined by acting talent including Sushant Singh Rajput, Bhumi Pednekar, Manoj Bajpayee, Ranvir Shorey, and Ashutosh Rana. Sonchiriya was nominated across several categories at the Filmfare Awards including Best Screenplay and Best Dialogues for and won the Critics Award for Best Film and Best Costume Design. Sudip has also been the Creative Producer for projects produced under Anushka Sharma's banner production company, Clean Slate Films, including Phillauri a fantasy-comedy, and Pari, a horror-mystery.

In addition to writing for films, Sharma has also worked on series. He is the creator, showrunner, and co-writer of the Amazon Prime Video Original - Paatal Lok - a Hindi-language crime thriller, about a disillusioned cop who lands the case of an assassination attempt gone wrong. Sharma co-wrote the series with Sagar Haveli, Hardik Mehta, and Gunjit Chopra. The series was directed by Avinash Arun and Prosit Roy, produced by Clean Slate Filmz, and starred Jaideep Ahlawat, Gul Panag, Neeraj Kabi, Swastika Mukherjee, Ishwak Singh, and Abhishek Banerjee in the lead roles. Paatal Lok received rave reviews from critics, who praised the writing, storyline, direction, and performances. The series was listed in the Top 10 Indian Web Series of 2020 by The Indian Express, and as one of the best international TV shows of 2020 by Variety. Paatal Lok received eight nominations at the inaugural Filmfare OTT Awards, and won five awards including Best Series, Best Original Story, Best Screenplay, Best Direction (Avinash Arun and Prosit Roy), and Best Actor (Jaideep Ahlawat).

The second season of Paatal Lok was released in January 2025 and was also listed as being one of the top ten viewed series on Amazon Prime Video in 2025. Sharma also worked on Kohrra (2023), which received widespread critical acclaim and won multiple awards, including Best Series at the Critics' Choice Awards India 2024 and the Indian Film Festival of Melbourne Awards 2024.

He debuted as a director with Season 2 of Kohrra, which premiered on 11 February 2026 on Netflix to strong reviews. He was the creative producer for the Netflix series Mai, starring Sakshi Tanwar, which released in April 2022. Currently, he is in production on a series with a leading platform.

Sharma founded his production company, Act Three Productions, in 2022. Under Act Three, he co-produced the second season of Kohrra and has other series and motion pictures in development.

== Filmography ==
=== Films ===
Year	Title	Screenwriter	Creative producer
2008	Superstar	Yes	
2010	Semshook	Yes	
2012	Players	Yes	
2015	NH10	Yes	
2016	Udta Punjab	Yes	
2017	Phillauri		Yes
2018	Pari		Yes
2019	Sonchiriya	Yes	
2019	Laal Kaptaan	Dialogues	
2025	Bandar	Yes	

=== Television ===
Year	Title	Creator	Writer	Executive producer
2020–2025	Paatal Lok	Yes	Yes	Yes
2023–present	Kohrra	Yes	Yes	Yes

== Awards ==
Year	Title	Award	Category	Result
2017	Udta Punjab	Stardust Awards, India	Best Screenplay (Shared with Abhishek Chaubey)	Won Readers' Choice
2020	Sonchiriya	Filmfare Awards	Best Original Story (Shared with Abhishek Chaubey)	Nominated
2020	Sonchiriya	Filmfare Awards	Best Screenplay	Nominated
2020	Sonchiriya	Filmfare -Technical Awards	Best Dialogue	Nominated
2020	Paatal Lok	Asian Television Awards	Best Original Screenplay (Shared with Sagar Haveli, Hardik Mehta, Gunjit Chopra)	Nominated
2020	Paatal Lok	Asian Television Awards	Best Original Screenplay (Shared with Sagar Haveli, Hardik Mehta, Gunjit Chopra)	Won
2020	Paatal Lok	Filmfare OTT Awards	Best Series	Won
2020	Paatal Lok	Filmfare OTT Awards	Best Original Story (Series) (Shared with Sagar Haveli, Hardik Mehta, Gunjit Chopra)	Won
2020	Paatal Lok	Filmfare OTT Awards	Best Screenplay (Shared with Sagar Haveli, Hardik Mehta, Gunjit Chopra)	Won
2020	Paatal Lok	Filmfare OTT Awards	Best Dialogues (Shared with Sagar Haveli, Hardik Mehta, Gunjit Chopra)	Nominated
