= Paatal Lok =

Indian television series

- Promotional poster
- Genre: Neo noir Crime thriller
- Created by: Sudip Sharma
- Written by: Sudip Sharma; Sagar Haveli; Hardik Mehta; Gunjit Chopra; Tamal Sen; Abhishek Banerjee; Rahul Kanojia
- Directed by: Avinash Arun; Prosit Roy (season one)
- Starring: Jaideep Ahlawat; Ishwak Singh; Gul Panag
- Composers: Naren Chandavarkar; Benedict Taylor
- Country of origin: India
- Original languages: Haryanvi; Hindi; Tamil; English
- No. of seasons: 2
- No. of episodes: 17

Production
- Producers: Anushka Sharma (season one); Karnesh Ssharma
- Production location: India
- Cinematography: Avinash Arun; Saurabh Goswami
- Editor: Sanyukta Kaza
- Running time: 43–53 Minutes
- Production company: Clean Slate Filmz

Original release
- Network: Amazon Prime Video
- Release: 15 May 2020—17 January 2025

Paatal Lok (transl. Netherworld) (Note: Patala in Hindu cosmology denotes the subterranean realms of the universe. Sanskrit पाताल (IAST: pātāla) literally means 'that which is below the feet') is an Indian neo-noir crime thriller television series on Amazon Prime Video, created by Sudip Sharma, who wrote the script along with Sagar Haveli, Hardik Mehta and Gunjit Chopra, and directed by Avinash Arun and Prosit Roy. The series was produced under the banner Clean Slate Filmz, and stars Jaideep Ahlawat, Gul Panag, Neeraj Kabi, Swastika Mukherjee, Ishwak Singh, Abhishek Banerjee, Niharika Lyra Dutt, and Richa Chaturvedi. Loosely based on Tarun Tejpal's 2010 novel The Story of My Assassins, the first season is about a disillusioned cop who lands the case of an assassination attempt gone wrong. Ahlawat, Singh, and Panag reprised their roles in the second season (set amidst political turmoil in Nagaland), and were joined by Tillotama Shome, Jahnu Barua, Nagesh Kukunoor and Prashant Tamang.

Sudip Sharma wrote the script in January 2017, and took more than a year for writing and pre-production. It is filmed across more than 110 real locations, with Paatal Lok being the first series to be shot at Chitrakoot. The cinematography for the series were handled by Avinash Arun and Saurabh Goswami, with editing done by Sanyukta Kaza. The background score was jointly composed by Naren Chandravarkar and Benedict Taylor.

The first season of Paatal Lok was premiered on Amazon Prime Video on 15 May 2020. The series received rave reviews from critics, praising the performances, storyline, writing and direction. The series were listed in the Top 10 Indian Web Series of 2020, by The Indian Express. Variety listed Paatal Lok as one of the best international TV shows of 2020. In May 2020, the makers announced that the second season is to be conceptualized. The second season was released on 17 January 2025.

Paatal Lok received eight nominations at the inaugural Filmfare OTT Awards, and won five awards – Best Actor (Jaideep Ahlawat), Best Series, Best Original Story, Best Screenplay and Best Direction (Avinash Arun and Prosit Roy).

== Synopsis ==
The show revolves around Hathiram Chowdhary (Jaideep Ahlawat) a cynical police officer who gets assigned to investigate a high-profile case. As he gets caught in the investigation, he gets dragged into the darker realms of the underworld. Paatal Lok is inspired by traditional concepts of Svarga, Dharti and Paatal (heaven, earth and the Underworld), as metaphors for the different classes of India and the four estates, with Paatal (Underworld) being served as the prime phase of the storyline, which takes place in East Delhi, Delhi.

== Cast and characters ==
=== Main ===
- Jaideep Ahlawat as Inspector Hathiram Chaudhary
- Gul Panag as Renu Chaudhary, Hathiram's wife
- Ishwak Singh as Imran Ansari, Hathiram's junior

==== Season one ====
- Neeraj Kabi as Sanjeev Mehra, a reputable journalist and news anchor
- Richa Chaturvedi as Media House receptionist
- Swastika Mukherjee as Dolly Mehra, Sanjeev's wife
- Niharika Lyra Dutt as Sara Matthews, a young journalist at Sanjeev's station who begins an affair with him
- Abhishek Banerjee as Vishal "Hathoda" Tyagi, a notorious hitman and one of the four suspects arrested in the plot to murder Sanjeev Mehra
- Jagjeet Sandhu as Tope Singh ("Chaaku"), one of the four suspects who ran away from his village after murdering people of other castes
- Aasif Khan as Kabir M, one of the four suspects who hides his Muslim faith from the public
- Mairembam Ronaldo Singh as Mary Lyngdoh ("Cheeni"), a transgender Nepali woman who is arrested along with the other three suspects
- Vipin Sharma as DCP Bhagat, Hathiram's commanding officer
- Anurag Arora as SHO Virk, Hathiram's senior officer who previously trained under him
- Akash Khurana as Singh Saab, owner of Mehra's news station
- Manish Choudhary as Vikram Kapoor, a former rival of Mehra's who becomes his business partner
- Sandeep Mahajan as Delhi Intelligence officer Dahiya
- Rajesh Sharma as Gwala Gujjar, a tycoon who runs an organized crime ring out of Chittrakoot
- Sanjeeva Vats (voice) and Akshay Sharma (physical performance) as Donullia Gujjar, the shadowy, reclusive leader of Chittrakoot's organized crime ring and Gwala's brother; referred to as "Masterji" by his subordinates
- Bodhisattva Sharma as Siddharth Chaudhary, Hathiram's son
- Anup Jalota as Balkishan Bajpayee, a prominent politician known for making inroads with Chittrakoot's Dalit community
- Anindita Bose as Chanda Mukherjee, Tope Singh's ex-girlfriend
- Asif Basra as Jai Malik
- V K Sharma as Old Sadhu
- Tushar Dutt as Raju Bhaiyya
- Azzy Bagria as Constable
- Amit Raj as journalist
- Manju Bahuguna as Hathoda Tyagi's mother
- Ajay Raju as Chaiwala
- Suvinder Vicky as Balbir Singh Sekhon (who rapes Chaku's mother)

==== Season two ====
- Jahnu Barua as Rangthong Ken (partially inspired by Thuingaleng Muivah)
- Nagesh Kukunoor as Kapil Reddy
- Merenla Imsong as Rose Lizo
- Tillotama Shome as SP Meghna Barua
- Rokibul Hossain as Guddu
- Prashant Tamang as Daniel Acho
- Prateek Pachauri as Bittu Rahman
- Nikhil Angrish as Jr. Bajoria
- Bendang Walling as Issac
- Azzy Bagria as Constable
- LC Sekhose as Reuben Thom
- Pali Sandhu as Satbir Brar
- Shubro Bhattacharya as Praveen Sinha
- Ariensa Longchar as Silas
- Kaguirong Gonmei as Jonathan Thom
- Shailesh Kumar as Raghu Paswan
- Rozelle Mero as Asenla Thom
- Theyie Keditsu as Grace Reddy
- Viren Burman as Dhruv Malik
- Lovita Morang as Rose's Mother
- Kenny Basumatary as DIG Kohima

== Episodes ==
Series	Episodes	Originally released
1	9	15 May 2020
2	8	17 January 2025

=== Season 1 ===
No. overall	No. in season	Title	Directed by	Written by	Original release date
1	1	"Bridges"	Avinash Arun & Prosit Roy	Sudip Sharma	May 15, 2020
In Delhi, Deputy Commissioner of Police Vishram Bhagat arrests four youngsters, Vishal Tyagi, Tope Singh, Mary Lyngdoh, and Kabir M. after a dramatic chase through the streets and charges them with conspiracy to murder Sanjeev Mehra, a high-profile journalist who is editor-in-chief at his own national news channel. The investigation is handed to journeyman policeman Hathi Ram Chaudhary and his partner Imran Ansari. They believe Tope Singh is the ringleader and try to build links between the four arrested. Mehra is engaged in a power struggle with his bosses who attempt to force him out of the channel. He has a frayed relationship with his wife Dolly, who suffers from crippling anxiety. While running background checks on the arrested, the cops find that Tyagi is a notorious felon and murderer who has never been caught before. They bring this information to Mehra, but fail to find any link or motive explaining the planned attack.
2	2	"Lost and Found"	Avinash Arun & Prosit Roy	Sagar Haveli, Hardik Mehta & Gunjit Chopra	May 15, 2020
The investigation reveals that the four accused were contacted independently and brought together to execute the murder as part of a bigger plan. The cops find that Tyagi was desperate to talk to one "Master Ji" prior to getting arrested and may have been planning to call off the attack. Chaudhary's team tries to extract information from the suspects using a variety of methods, but gains little. Acting on a lead, Ansari tracks down Taariq, a mechanic who recruited Kabir for the job, but Taariq gives him the slip and escapes. Chaudhary is convinced that he must travel to Chitrakoot, the village where Tyagi went to school, to uncover his past. Mehra starts an affair with Sara Mathews, an investigative journalist at the news channel. Later he is called into the police station to identify the suspects, but is unable to do so, though making eye contact with Tyagi has a profound effect on him. A search along the Yamuna river nets the phone that Tope Singh had tossed away prior to being arrested.
3	3	"A History of Violence"	Avinash Arun & Prosit Roy	Sagar Haveli, Hardik Mehta & Gunjit Chopra	May 15, 2020
In the past, a school-going Tyagi murders three classmates with a hammer as revenge for them sexually assaulting his sisters. In the present, Ansari goes to rural Punjab to trace Tope Singh's origins and finds that he was embroiled in caste-based conflicts and forced to escape the village to save his life. In Chitrakoot, Chaudhary learns of Tyagi's history and the school incident, though Tyagi has not contacted his remaining family in years. Local journalist Amitosh offers Chaudhary cryptic information, which uncovers the name of local businessman and politician Gwala Gujjar. Meanwhile, Mehra runs his own investigation into Tyagi and has Sara obtain background information, which Mehra then broadcasts on primetime TV, causing an unwanted media frenzy for Delhi Police, who had intended to keep the names of the suspects under wraps.
4	4	"Sleepless in Seelampur"	Avinash Arun & Prosit Roy	Sagar Haveli, Hardik Mehta & Gunjit Chopra	May 15, 2020
Mehra blackmails his bosses to prevent them from removing him, and starts working with a former enemy to affect a takeover at the channel. Forensics teams are able to extract data from Tope Singh's recovered phone, revealing surveillance videos of Mehra and personal photos with a girl named Chanda. It is discovered that Mary is actually transgender, and her real name is Cheeni; she is moved to the men's cells. Chaudhary and Ansari visit Mukesh Talreja, the Delhi businessman who recruited Cheeni for the job, but come away empty-handed. Meanwhile, Taariq's body washes up at the docks; he's been strangled to death. Ansari passes the IAS exam, but draws a frigid reaction from Chaudhary. The information from the Mary/Cheeni fiasco leaks out to the media and causes further embarrassment for the Delhi Police, Chaudhary is suspended as a result and the investigation is handed off to the CBI.
5	5	"Of Fathers and Sons"	Avinash Arun & Prosit Roy	Sagar Haveli, Hardik Mehta & Gunjit Chopra	May 15, 2020
Chaudhary implores Bhagat to investigate the greater conspiracy, but Bhagat gently reminds him that he is suspended and sends him home. Dolly discovers that Sanjeev is having an affair and is heartbroken. Chaudhary's rebellious son Siddharth pulls a gun he has stolen from a small-time goon on a classmate after being bullied, as a result Chaudhary is summoned to the school. Chaudhary is in a drunken stupor as he deals with his suspension, but Ansari covers for him; the two men reconcile afterwards. The CBI investigation uncovers a larger plot by the ISI to eliminate prominent journalists and bring about political instability in India. They brief Mehra with this information, but he calls out the ISI on his primetime show, forcing the CBI's hand. At a press conference, the CBI claim that Kabir is a Pakistani operative and offer Jihadi literature found at his residence as proof. Ansari is suspicious, as he knows that Kabir cannot read Urdu. Sara is also suspicious, she manages to get hold of Chaudhary's case notebook and starts digging.
6	6	"The Past is Prologue"	Avinash Arun & Prosit Roy	Sagar Haveli, Hardik Mehta & Gunjit Chopra	May 15, 2020
Not buying into the CBI's terrorist theory, Chaudhary and Ansari begin an independent investigation, with aid from Sara. When they dig into Kabir's past, they find that his family was a victim of communal riots and his brother was killed by a mob; however, Kabir's father deny that he is radicalized or has any Jihadi links. Cheeni's childhood friend contacts Chaudhary and fills him in to her backstory: she is an orphaned vagrant who was molested as a child but was working hard to save enough money to escape the grind. Raju, the goon whose gun Siddharth stole, is under pressure from his boss and beats up Siddharth. When Chaudhary gets wind of this, he returns the gun to the gangster but savagely beats the entire gang, promising them that he'll kill them if they approach his son again. In prison, Kabir is attacked by another inmate, which Chaudhary suspects is an inside job. Sara posits that Bajpayee, a Chitrakoot politician with links to Gwala Gujjar is the ringleader behind the plot, and the CBI's terrorist theory is hogwash. While looking through old newspaper clippings, Chaudhary finds a photo that links Tyagi's high school coach to Bajpayee, information that the Coach withheld from Chaudhary when they last met.
7	7	"Badlands"	Avinash Arun & Prosit Roy	Sudip Sharma	May 15, 2020
Back in Chitrakoot, Chaudhary tracks down the high school coach, who reveals that Bajpayee and Gwala are part of a shadowy organization run by the fearsome, reclusive overlord Donullia, who controls the politics and economy of the area, and runs a parallel government from his jungle hideout. The coach had been a policeman, and later an informant for Donullia, and brought Tyagi to him after he had committed the school murders. Over time, Tyagi became a trusted hitman for Donullia, who is the "Master Ji' he was attempting to contact earlier. Donullia and Tyagi share a strong love for canines and the philosophy "If a man loves a dog, he's a good man." However, the coach has lost touch with both Donullia and Tyagi, and is clueless as to why they might target Mehra. Meanwhile, the newfound focus on Mehra has brought success to his news channel, and Sara begins to see that he's not an idealistic journalist but rather an egotistical man only interested in furthering himself and his channel. Bhagat calls Chaudhary to warn him that his continuing investigation will lead to a charge of insubordination, but Chaudhary is desperate to prove his worth to himself and his family, and ignores the warning.
8	8	"Black Widow"	Avinash Arun & Prosit Roy	Sudip Sharma	May 15, 2020
Chaudhary tracks down Chanda, Tope Singh's ex-girlfriend, who is now with involved with Shukla, who is the personal assistant to Bajpayee. She reveals she was accidentally caught up in Shukla's attempts to recruit Tope Singh for the job due to their shared history, though she is clueless about the motive behind the plot. Working on a new theory, Chaudhary requests Bhagat's phone records, though he tries to shield Ansari from this as it would kill his career prospects. Amitosh informs Chaudhary that there is a rift between Gwala and Bajpayee, and Gwala plans to contest the upcoming elections against Bajpayee. Chaudhary breaks into the archives to confirm another theory but he is kidnapped by Donullia's henchmen after finding the documents. Ansari receives Bhagat's phone records and is able to confirm another theory - the target was not Mehra, it was the four suspects in the car. Bhagat was to kill them in a fake police "encounter," but was prevented by the lucky arrival of a media van.
9	9	"Swarg ka Dwaar"	Avinash Arun & Prosit Roy	Sudip Sharma	May 15, 2020
Chaudhary is taken to Donullia's jungle hideout, where he confronts Gwala with the truth: Donullia has been dead for a while but this has been kept secret. Gwala wants to enter politics against Bajpayee, who is aware of Donullia's death and who fears the wrath of Tyagi, Donullia's most feared hitman. Bajpayee engineered the plot to have Tyagi encountered by Bhagat, recruiting Kabir, Cheeni, and Tope Singh to add legitimacy and dissolve suspicion. The police and the CBI played their part in the cover up, cooking up the non-existent terrorist plot. Gwala debates eliminating Chaudhary as he knows too much, but sees another political opportunity and lets him go. With additional dirt on Bajpayee, Gwala gains himself a position of higher influence by joining hands with Bajpayee. Bhagat informs Chaudhary that his suspension is revoked as a reward for keeping the delicate Gwala-Bajpayee-Donullia system intact, as this is a system that works for the people of the area. As Tyagi is being taken to the court, Chaudhary informs him of Donullia's death, and a distraught Tyagi steals a gun from a policeman and commits suicide. When Chaudhary informs Mehra that he was not the intended target, but rather a random name used in a cover-up, it is a serious blow to Mehra's ego. He chooses to spin the story that Tyagi killed himself to avoid giving testimony, still propagating the terrorist theory.

=== Season 2 ===
No. overall	No. in season	Title	Produced by	Directed by	Written by	Original release date
10	1	"Head On"	Babita Ashiwal, Karnesh Ssharma	Avinash Arun	Sudip Sharma	January 17, 2025
The staff at Nagaland Sadan discover the decapitated body of Jonathan Thom, a Naga leader who was in Delhi for the Nagaland Business Summit. Hathiram is still an Inspector at Outer Jamuna Paar police station, and Renu is unhappy with their financial status. Her brother tries to convince him to take a private position with Bhalla, who is looking to hire former military or police personnel as "security" for a hawala business. Ansari, who has now been promoted to ACP, leads the investigation. Thom's security guard Daniel says that Thom had asked him to take the night off. The CCTV footage shows Rose Lizo, a club hostess, hurriedly leaving Nagaland Sadan at the time of the murder. Ansari sends out a lookout notice for her and questions Dhruv Mallik, the owner of the club. Kapil Reddy, special adviser to the Govt. of India, placates Uncle Ken and the rest of the Nagaland delegation. Hathiram takes on the case of Gita Paswan who reports that her husband Raghu is missing. His employer Jogi, a fruit wholesaler, says that Raghu made frequent trips to Nagaland to transport fruit back to Delhi. Paswan's wife is injured and subsequently dies in an accident. At the hospital, Hathi Ram notices her son being frightened by two suspicious men. He gives chase but they escape. CCTV footage from the train station shows Raghu and Rose leaving together on the train to Nagaland.
11	2	"Kohima Calling"	Babita Ashiwal, Karnesh Ssharma	Avinash Arun	Rahul Kanojia	January 17, 2025
DCP Bhardwaj reviews the CCTV footage of Raghu Paswan and Rose Lizo with Ansari but refuses to let Hathiram join the investigation team. Going back to question Jogi, the police find the business closed. Hathiram breaks into Jogi's office and finds several invoices from a travel agency. The travel agent tells him that there are travelers coming back from Nagaland on the afternoon train. Hathiram tracks the travelers to a warehouse where he finds that Jogi is running a narcotics ring. Ansari sends ACP Virk and his narcotics team to raid the warehouse. Hathiram gets knocked out in the melee and wakes up to find that Virk has taken all the credit. Ansari uses this as leverage to get Hathiram on the investigation team. Interrogating Jogi, Hathiram finds out that Paswan's wife was accidentally killed by his goons who were trying to scare her away and his connect in Nagaland was a drug dealer named Max Rizu. Dhruv Mallik, the owner of the club where Lizo worked and the one Jogi supplied with drugs shows up with an anticipatory bail order to stymie the police. A video of three masked individuals claiming responsibility for Thom's murder stirs media frenzy. In Nagaland, a constable spots Rose Lizo. Hathiram takes Paswan's motherless child home, much to his wife's chagrin. Hathiram and Ansari leave for Nagaland.
12	3	"Four Murders and a Funeral"	Babita Ashiwal, Karnesh Ssharma	Avinash Arun	Abhishek Banerjee	January 17, 2025
Hathiram and Ansari reach Nagaland. At the airport they meet a local fixer, Bittu Rehman. SP Meghna Barua picks them up and they go to Thom's funeral, where tensions rise at Thom's estranged son Reuben's arrival. Reuben's mom warns him to make sure that the police do not dig too deep. Hathiram and Ansari learn of Thom's drug business and his connection with Max Rizu. Hathiram tries to trace Paswan but gets caught in a police raid and is held as he has no identification but Bittu manages to get him out. Ansari and Hathiram find that Rose used to work at Reddy's wife's hotel before she was fired. Barua finds Rizu's body hanging in a barn. The three individuals who had claimed responsibility for Jonathan Thom's murder are shot dead by Daniel.
13	4	"Missed Call"	Babita Ashiwal, Karnesh Ssharma	Avinash Arun	Tamal Sen	January 17, 2025
Hathiram and Ansari investigate the murder of the three individuals, only to realise that the three were set up for this. Ansari notices that the three have a similar tattoo on their wrists which is a date on which the Langchoma massacre happened. Hathiram answers a call from Ansari's purported significant other, to hear a male voice on the phone. He expresses his acceptance to Ansari. Hathiram discovers Raghu Paswan's link to Reddy's hotel when he interrogates the hotel accountant, who tells him that a figure of 1 lakh rupees was picked up by Paswan every month . Upon arriving in Delhi for his son's birthday as a surprise, Hathiram's son refuses to go out with his family, choosing to spend the day with his college friends instead. Reuben threatens Reddy and tells him he wants his fathers money back. Grace Reddy negotiates a sale of her hotel properties but Reubens men scare the buyers off. Meanwhile, Ansari receives an anonymous call with a lead on Rose Lizo and goes looking for her on his own as Barua does not respond to his call. Ansari finds Rose being attacked by Reuben and his men and when he tries to defend her, she flees on foot as he gives chase. Ansari and Rose manage to escape the attackers in Ansari's car but are shot on the drive by Daniel. Ansari is killed and Rose is shot in the back as she pulls herself out from the wreckage of the jeep.
14	5	"Off Balance"	Babita Ashiwal, Karnesh Ssharma	Avinash Arun	Rahul Kanojia	January 17, 2025
The police look for Rose Lizo in the jungles she last disappeared in with Daniel looking for her too. Reuben is accused of killing Ansari and after shoot at sight orders are issued for him, he escapes in the jungle to join the rebels that are still in hiding. In Delhi, Hathiram is pressured by the Home Ministry into going along with story that Reuben is the killer. But he is not okay with Ansari being made the scapegoat for all that transpired. Some records show that Dhruv was near Nagaland Sadan on the night of the murder and Hathiram finds video footage of him dropping of Rose and then waiting for her outside. Hathiram and Virk gatecrash Dhruv's pre wedding ceremony and interrogate him. Dhruv reveals that Rose had a child with Thom and they were going to blackmail him for 2 crores, which was supposed to be the money to be used to save Dhruv's failing business. But she never came back and managed to run away with the help of Raghu Paswan. Reuben calls Reddy and threatens him. Reddy, sensing he has the upper hand, tries to convince him to surrender. Hathiram leaves for Nagaland to search for the real killers.
15	6	"Of Mothers and Daughters"	Babita Ashiwal, Karnesh Ssharma	Avinash Arun	Abhishek Banerjee	January 17, 2025
The episode begins with a flashback of Thom's daughter committing suicide. Hathiram lands in Nagaland and joins forces with Meghna. One of the investors interested in buying Reddys hotels is killed. Hathiram meets with the investor's brother who tells him that Kapil Reddy wants to sell all his holdings in Nagaland and move to Europe. Hathiram speaks with the cops who he knows are Reubens men and tells them that he wants to meet Reuben. Daniel reveals Rose's hospital location on social media and a mob of Thom's supporters attack the hospital. Hathiram and Meghna manage to spirit Rose away from the hospital after battling some of the mob. Hathiram learns that Esther, Rose's friend from rehab, has been raising Rose's daughter Jane and that Paswan was trying to arrange passage for Rose and Jane to cross the border. He also learns that the money picked up by Paswan from Reddy's hotel was sent by Thom's wife Asenla. Grace Reddy meets Asenla and asks her for help in convincing the investors to go ahead with the hotel deal. Reuben learns of this and asks his men to setup a meeting with Hathiram. Hathiram finds that Thom's daughter and Rose were classmates at Muriel Convent.
16	7	"Children of Men"	Babita Ashiwal, Karnesh Ssharma	Avinash Arun	Tamal Sen	January 17, 2025
Hathiram is picked up by Reuben's men with Meghna and Daniel on his tail. On meeting Reuben, he figures out that his sister committed suicide when she learnt about Jonathan's affair with Rose. Hathiram also correctly deduces that Rose was fathered by Jonathan. Reuben tells him that money from Jonathan's drug business was being laundered through Reddy's hotels. Reuben also tells him that Jonathan was not interested in the development summit but something changed at the last minute which made him go to Delhi. Daniel shoots and kills Reuben, leaving Hathiram and Meghna to deal with Reuben's men. Virk informs Hathiram that the narcotics file on Reddy was closed and disappeared by some orders from the top. Meghna and Hathiram conclude that Reddy tipped off the police leading to the big drug raid which caused a massive financial loss for Thom, forcing him to attend the summit. Virk interrogates Daniel's girlfriend and finds out that he was not with her on the night of the murder. He also finds out that Daniel is connected to Langchoma. Hathiram finds out that as an orphan, Daniel was adopted by Uncle Ken. He also realises that Bittu has been giving information to Daniel, enabling Daniel to kill Ansari and Reuben. Finding that Daniel owns the tours and travels jeep that Bittu was driving, Meghna decides to stop at the owners listed address only to be captured by Daniel. After forcing Meghna to call Hathiram to the town square, Daniel shoots her dead.
17	8	"The Good Samaritan"	Babita Ashiwal, Karnesh Ssharma	Avinash Arun	Sudip Sharma	January 17, 2025
The episode begins with a flashback showing how Rose and Raghu met. Hathiram arrives at the town square and is almost shot by Daniel from the hotel window. He battles and kills Daniel in the hotel kitchen. He then visits Uncle Ken the next morning. Uncle Ken reveals that he slit Jonathan's throat after Jonathan found out that Reddy set him up and was about to leave the summit, which would lead the summit to collapse without his support. Daniel helped Ken decapitate the body and subsequently kill anyone who could damage the chances of the summit's success. Seeing the impact of the summits success on the people, Hathiram chooses not to reveal the truth. On the way to the airport, Hathiram finds out that Rose has passed away in the hospital. Raghu's parents and roommate come to pick up his son. After they leave, Hathiram recollects something he saw on the CCTV captured outside the Sadan. He sees the same rickshaw operated by Raghu's roommate pass by. On interrogation, he finds that Raghu borrowed the rickshaw to help Rose flee that night and on returning back, an altercation with his room mates led to his murder at their hands. Hathiram tells Virk that he is leaving the force. When Virk uses a torn note, Hathiram recollects the night waiter's mention of a torn note in Thom's purse. He retrieves the note from evidence and with Bhalla's help, finds 2 crores sitting with another hawala operator. Leaving the rest, he takes only 5 lakhs from the stash, the money which Raghu was promised by Rose and manages to give it to his son, before his train departs. As the train leaves the station, Hathiram walks away with a smile on his face.

== Production ==
=== Development ===
Paatal Lok is a police-based investigative thriller inspired by the traditional concepts of Svarga, Dharti and Paatal (heaven, earth and the hell), as metaphors for the different classes of India and the four estates. Vijay Subramanian, head of content for Amazon Prime Video India, announced the series, along with six Indian originals, at the Television Critics Association's press tour held at Los Angeles, California in February 2019. Writer Sudip Sharma eventually explained about the concept of the series, in a virtual meet stating "There are primarily three classes, the upper, middle and lower which I personally associated to Swarg Lok, Dharti Lok and Paatal Lok, essentially derived from heaven, earth and the netherworld. The thought behind the concept of the show was to explore these three classes that exist in our society in the form of an investigative thriller. "We wanted to explore the three layers from the eyes of the investigator; i.e. the protagonist of the show, who represents the earth, the victim represents the heaven, and the suspects come from Paatal Lok." The series marked Sudip's fourth collaboration with Anushka Sharma's production house Clean Slate Filmz (NH10, Phillauri and Pari), and the latter's debut in digital platforms. Anushka stated in an interview with Press Trust of India, that "I acknowledge that I have made a career and a name for myself, which is relevant. I want to be able to use the position that I've created with my hard work as an actor and be able to back the stories, people and talent."

=== Writing ===
Sudip Sharma began writing Paatal Lok in the beginning of January 2017. For Sharma it was his maiden attempt at writing in long-form. The writing team also consisted of Hardik Mehta, Gunjit Chopra, Sagar Haveli who were also beginners in writing a series. Sharma wrote the first and last three episodes, while the remaining five were written by the other writers. All the writers did field research visiting places in Delhi and Uttar Pradesh in August 2017. The writing of the series took more than a year to complete, followed by research works and location scouting, and other process of pre-production. The show has two directors, Prosit Roy and Avinash Arun Dhaware, both directing different portions of the series. On hiring the directors, Sudip Sharma eventually stated "The minute both Prosit and Avinash were hired, I locked myself in a room with them for two weeks. Everyday, from 9 am to 7 pm, we would come in and go over the script again and again. In the process, we discussed how we would approach each scene, rewrote some parts, and changed character graphs. What that did was that by the end, the script was as much theirs as it was the writers."

=== Casting ===
Sudip eventually wrote the script with the protagonist Jaideep Ahlawat in mind, stating that "he had a phenomenal presence". He gave the script to Jaideep, who read two or three episodes of the script at night, and Jaideep eventually met Sudip and Karnesh Sharma, the following day to read the entire script. Jaideep eventually stated in an interview with The Indian Express, that "What I found interesting was that the first impression you get of all the characters is in black and white — the criminals, the media and the cops. There's a clear segregation. But as the story progresses, all the characters merge into each other in such a way that you don't realise what's right and what's wrong."

Jaideep did not take any projects, in the intermediate time, despite being approached for Khaali Peeli (2020). While shooting for the series, he eventually increased his weight from 85 to 100 kilograms, as the show became physically demanding. Jaideep stated that the temperature ranged around 45-46 degrees, which eventually became difficult to shoot. Ishwak Singh, made his digital debut through the series, stated that "The shooting process in the digital world is quite different from that of the movie. While shooting for 'Paatal Lok', it was like shooting for three movies, as the makers had a bigger canvas to paint and a lot more to express and communicate." Gul Panag describes Renu Chaudhary, Hathiram's wife, as "the kind of middle-class wife whose aspirations are linked to her husbands".

Abhishek Banerjee also served as the casting director of the series, apart from playing the role of Hathoda Tyagi, the main antagonist in the series. Swastika Mukherjee, who played the role of Dolly Mehra, stated that he got a call from Banerjee, at October 2018, and sent her audition tape, which received a good feedback. She later came to Mumbai, for the audition process, which eventually worked well, although the actor joined the shoot, post completing her portions in Dil Bechara (2020). Although her character was not a lengthy one, she stated "length is not a prerequisite for me, and it would be stupid to choose roles depending on its length or dialogues. What makes sense is to understand the quality and also what you can bring to the table."

=== Filming ===
Sudip eventually stated about having two directors to shoot the web series, stating it had as much to do with logistics as it had to do with artistry, He added "It's physically very difficult for one director to shoot continuously for 100 days. In web-series, because of the format, directors come in late and then if you dump nine-ten episodes on one person, it's very difficult for them to process this new world, these new characters and do complete justice to it." The series has been shot in 110 cities in India, with 70% of the shoot took place at actual locations, and the rest of the shoot was held at Mumbai. Shot mostly in major portions across North India, including Delhi and Uttar Pradesh,

Sudip chose locations with which he was familiar and had researched for his previous work. He chose to set the plot in Delhi, as Sudip stated "Its the apex of the Indian political scene and where the power lies. Also, most media channels operate out of Delhi. Another reason to consider Delhi was because of its location: it has the feel of a frontier town bordering to certain parts of Uttar Pradesh, Haryana and Rajasthan. These were aspects that we considered mainly because of what it is surrounded by and the representation in terms of power and national setting."

But in order to make the show as authentic, the makers decided to shoot some portions in Chitrakoot and Punjab for the landscape; with this Paatal Lok becoming the first web series to be shot at Chitrakoot. He stated "This is the first time any film, or series has been shot in Chitrakoot. When we had initially visited Chitrakoot for a scout, we weren't aware of the terrain and the lack of infrastructure. We had to build the entire shooting eco-system from scratch. Luckily for us, a hotel had recently opened there, and that helped us a lot. The town is almost like a quaint forgotten town, something like Banaras but without the hustle and bustle."

=== Soundtrack ===
Paatal Lok's original score and soundtrack were jointly composed by Naren Chandravarkar and British violist Benedict Taylor. The score received positive response from critics. In an article from Scroll.in titled Best of 2020 Music in Films and Web Series, Devarsi Ghosh stated "The gloomy landscape created by background score stylists Benedict Taylor and Naren Chandavarkar neither calls for attention nor can be ignored. The Paatal Lok score snakes through the roughly 360-minute series as a character in itself, dipping in and out of the sound design, hiding in the shadows, appearing only when necessary."

A promotional single "Toofan Main", sung by Prabh Deep and produced by Sez on the Beat, was released through YouTube on 22 May 2020, and received applause from audiences. The ending credits of the series features a reused rendition of the bhajan "Sakal Hans Mein Ram Viraje" by Prahlad Tipanya, famous for singing Kabir in the Malwi folk tradition. Tipaniya is named in the credits for the song and composition, while the lyrics are attributed to Guru Nanak. However, the series misattributed the credits for the song, which is written by Nanak Das, a renowned poet from Saurashtra. According to Niranjan Rajguru, a scholar and professor of Gujarati literature at Saurashtra University, "Few of Nanak Das's compositions have been heard outside Gujarat, Sakal Hans is an exception as it was picked up by Prahlad Tipaniya who adapted it into Hindi."

== Themes and analysis ==
=== Mythological tropes ===
Socio-economic divisions in India are metaphorically compared with the mythological Indian concepts of Svarga, Dharti and Paatal (heaven, earth, and hell). Delhi is used as the story-telling playground where Lutyens Delhi is heaven, Vasant Vihar and Noida is the earth while Jamna Paar in East Delhi is hell. The climax of the story is also based on the mythological fable of Yudhisthira's dog from the Mahabharata. In the closing moments, on an outing with his family, Hathiram Chaudhary spots a stray dog at a distance and tosses his ice-cream to him. The ending simply suggests that even after being neck-deep in hell, Hathi has now somehow found his way to "heaven". The dog simply serves as an allegory for Hathi's lack of selfishness and righteousness in a world where it's very easy to fall prey to corruption.

=== Didactic themes ===
The show gives an insight into various forms of discrimination in India, through the perspectives of the four main antagonists – Kabir M, Tope Singh, Vishal "Hathoda" Tyagi and Ronaldo Singh (Cheeni). Kabir's backstory serves as a metaphor for religious fanaticism. Tope Singh's past revolves all around the toxic conflicts between the upper and lower castes. Cheeni's story brings out the issues of child abuse and discrimination against transgender people. Hathoda Tyagi's background gives insight into the abysmal state of women safety in rural India.

=== Politics ===
According to Tanul Thakur of The Wire, "Paatal Lok begins with the excitement of a fantastic bildungsroman. Later, at the end of this traditional coming-of-age play, the protagonist comes to a critical realisation, discovering his True Self. However, because Hathi is about to dive into a macabre murky realm, that classic cliche is given a wonderful twist: what if you find the world but lose yourself?" In addition to conveying a tight plot, the programme is astutely political. No matter how excellent an officer Ansari is, his last name follows him everywhere, subjecting him to harsh remarks — many of which are made by his colleagues. An extramarital romance between Sanjeev and his coworker Sara (Niharika Lyra Dutt), who is many years his junior, takes an unsettling turn, exposing his hidden hypocrisies. The petty power conflicts in the police station, particularly between Virk and Hathi, expose the Indian middle-innate class's cannibalism. And we witness a ruined India in the stories of Tope, Tyagi, Kabir, and Cheeni, where individuals are consumed and destroyed for no fault of their own, and where they in turn consume and destroy others.

== Release ==
Anushka Sharma released an announcement poster of the series, through the production house's Twitter account on 24 April 2020, and the teaser was unveiled the very same day. The first look poster was unveiled on 3 May 2020, and motion poster featuring Neeraj Kabi and Jaideep Ahlawat was released on the same day. The official trailer was unveiled through YouTube on 4 May 2020. The trailer received positive response from audiences, with The Indian Express stated that it is a "gripping crime drama". On 8 May 2020, posters featuring the five lead characters, were unveiled through social media platforms. The character trailer was unveiled on 9 May 2020. Paatal Lok was released through Amazon Prime Video on 15 May 2020, with the first episode being released earlier, on 14 May.

== Reception ==
=== Critical response ===
Paatal Lok Season 2 has received universal acclaim, with a 100% rating on Rotten Tomatoes from 11 reviews. It is currently rated 8.2/10 on IMDB.

==== Season 1 ====
The first season has an 8.1 rating on IMDB. Anupama Chopra of Film Companion wrote that the show "forces you to keep bingeing." Harish Wankhede of the Hindustan Times, stated that "Paatal Lok rises as a much-needed suspense thriller that is likely to be classified as a 'classic' soon." Saibal Chatterjee of NDTV gave it 4/5, and wrote "It plunges, unflinching, into an abyss and shines a light on the darkness at its heart." Shubhra Gupta of The Indian Express gave it 3.5/5 and commented on the show "managing to keep its hold on us." Namrata Joshi of The Hindu wrote "There is a steady momentum, an unmistakable sense of force underlining the craft in Paatal Lok: from the cinematography to the acting to the atmospherics." Renuka Vyahare of The Times of India gave it 4/5 and wrote "What essentially lies at the heart of Paatal Lok is a courageous screenplay that questions our society's nature of burying the truth." Ananya Bhattacharya of India Today reviewed "Paatal Lok leaves you asking for more." Priyanka Sinha Jha of News18 gave it 3.5/5, stating that the show "makes for a compelling watch." Meehika Barua of The Guardian stated "The stars of Paatal Lok speak out on the backlash surrounding their gritty portrayal of crime, corruption and caste inequalities." Tanul Thakur of The Wire commented on the differences between the two halves of the season, and said that "It's this seamless blend that makes the series remarkable."

Some reviews were more mixed. Swetha Ramakrishnan of Firstpost gave it 3/5 and stated "The primary problem with Paatal Lok is that it is trying too hard to be too many things: a thriller, a social commentary, an "edgy" take on new India and its fault lines." Nandini Ramanath of Scroll.in said "Paatal Lok admirably resists the temptation to stretch into another season, but its denouement is hurried and unconvincing." Udita Jhunjhunwala of The Quint gave it 3/5 and wrote "Paatal Lok lands somewhere between Delhi Crime and Mirzapur but doesn't quite get the urgency of the police investigation of the former or the grit and messiness of the latter." The New Indian Express commented "While both Tejpal's book and the David Fincher series obsess over their respective killers, Paatal Lok takes a more glancing approach."

==== Season 2 ====
The second season has an 8.4 rating on IMDB, receiving even more acclaim than the first season. Hollywood Reporter called it "just as dense, indirect, and plotty as the first season". NDTV said that "replicating the quality of the first season is itself a marvel, and the Times of India said that season 2 justified its long wait. The Hindustan Times praised the season and said that the show "retained its character", while the Deccan Chronicle called it "one of the most compelling series on Indian OTT platforms". The New Indian Express had a more mixed review, calling it "competent if not compelling."

=== Audience reaction ===
Paatal Lok opened to rave reviews, and has a 92% audience rating on Rotten Tomatoes. Many called it India's best Hindi-language series. The day the series was released, Anurag Kashyap tweeted that Paatal Lok is "the best crime thriller to come out of this country," adding that "It comes from the understanding of Real India. The dark heart of India, the communal and casteist India." Actors Manoj Bajpayee and Alia Bhatt both took to Twitter to praise the show and the acting. The HuffPost India and The Indian Express ranked Paatal Lok as the Best Hindi Series of 2020. Variety magazine listed Paatal Lok as one of the best international TV shows of 2020.

=== Awards and nominations ===
Year	Award	Category	Recipient(s) / nominee(s)	Result	Ref(s)
2020	Filmfare OTT Awards	Best Series	Amazon Prime Video	Won	
2020	Filmfare OTT Awards	Best Director (Drama Series)	Avinash Arun and Prosit Roy	Won	
2020	Filmfare OTT Awards	Best Actor (Drama Series)	Jaideep Ahlawat	Won	
2020	Filmfare OTT Awards	Best Original Story (Series)	Sudip Sharma, Sagar Haveli, Hardik Mehta and Gunjit Chopra	Won	
2020	Filmfare OTT Awards	Best Screenplay	Sudip Sharma, Sagar Haveli, Hardik Mehta and Gunjit Chopra	Won	
2020	Filmfare OTT Awards	Best Dialogues	Sudip Sharma, Sagar Haveli, Hardik Mehta and Gunjit Chopra	Nominated	
2020	Filmfare OTT Awards	Best Supporting Actor (Female) (Drama Series)	Swastika Mukherjee	Nominated	
2020	Filmfare OTT Awards	Best Supporting Actor (Female) (Drama Series)	Gul Panag	Nominated	
2020	Filmfare OTT Awards	Best Supporting Actor (Female) (Drama Series)	Merambam Ronaldo Singh	Nominated	
2020	Filmfare OTT Awards	Best Supporting Actor (Male) (Drama Series)	Abhishek Banerjee	Nominated	
2020	Filmfare OTT Awards	Best Supporting Actor (Male) (Drama Series)	Ishwak Singh	Nominated	
2021	Indian Television Academy Award	Landmark OTT	Clean Slate Filmz	Won	
2021	Indian Television Academy Award	Best Actor	Jaideep Ahlawat	Won	

== Controversies ==
The series garnered controversy over the use of the slur "Nepali randi" in the second episode. Indra Hang Subba, a Member of Parliament from Sikkim, wrote to the Ministry of Information and Broadcasting about the matter. A complaint was filed by "All Arunachal Pradesh Gorkha Youth Association (AAPGYA)" to the National Human Rights Commission while a legal notice was also sent by the Lawyers Guild. Bharatiya Janata Party legislator Nand Kishore Gurjar filed a complaint related to "unauthorised use of his likeness" in the show as well as accused the show of being "anti-national" in numerous ways. The youth wing of the Bharatiya Gorkha Parisangh, Bharatiya Yuva Gorkha showed concern and demanded ban on the series.

Manjinder Singh Sirsa, former Akali Dal MLA and Delhi Sikh Gurudwara Prabandhak Committee president, called for a ban on the series for maligning Sikhs. He was referring to a scene where a Sikh man is shown raping a woman, as a few other men watch on. He tweeted that the series must be banned for maligning "religious harmony". Sirsa also appealed to information and broadcasting minister, Prakash Javadekar to ban the show and threatened legal action against Amazon Prime Video. A notice was filed against the makers at the Punjab and Haryana High Court in June 2020.
