= Sonchiriya =

2019 Indian film directed by Abhishek Chaubey

- Theatrical release poster
- Directed by: Abhishek Chaubey
- Screenplay by: Sudip Sharma
- Story by: Abhishek Chaubey; Sudip Sharma
- Produced by: Ronnie Screwvala
- Starring: Manoj Bajpayee; Sushant Singh Rajput; Bhumi Pednekar; Ashutosh Rana; Ranvir Shorey
- Cinematography: Anuj Rakesh Dhawan
- Edited by: Meghna Manchanda Sen
- Music by: Vishal Bhardwaj
- Production companies: RSVP Movies; MacGuffin Pictures
- Distributed by: RSVP Movies
- Release date: 1 March 2019
- Running time: 143 minutes
- Country: India
- Languages: Hindi; Bundeli
- Budget: ₹22 crore
- Box office: est. ₹10.42 crore

Sonchiriya (transl. The golden bird; Hindi pronunciation: [soːntʃɪɽɪjaː]; ISO: Sōnaciṛiyā ) is a 2019 Indian Hindi-language western action drama film co-written and directed by Abhishek Chaubey, starring Manoj Bajpayee in a guest appearance, Sushant Singh Rajput, Bhumi Pednekar, Ashutosh Rana and Ranvir Shorey. The film presents a rooted tale set in Chambal. Its dialogues are entirely in the Bundeli dialect.

The film was released on 1 March 2019 in 940 screens worldwide, with 720 screens in India and 220 in overseas regions. The film received positive reviews from critics, who praised the performances, direction, writing, cinematography and visual styles.

== Plot ==
Set in the ravines of the Chambal valley, the film tells the tale of dacoits in 1975, who termed themselves Baaghi, the rebels.

Lacchu gives information to the Baaghis that a dowry of tons of gold and cash will be given to the bride by her father so Dacoit Maan Singh a.k.a. 'Dadda' should raid it. Special Task Force (STF) headed by Inspector Virendra Singh Gujjar attacks them during the loot in which Dadda gets killed. This leads to a split between the gang. Lakhna wants to surrender to the police, while Vakil Singh wants to follow Baaghi's dharm (way of life) of rebellion.

On the run, they meet a woman with her young sister, whose family has been killed by rival gang and seeks their assistance to take her sister to hospital. As the visit the doctor at night, police raids the doctor's house. Baaghi's find out that the young girl belongs to untouchable caste. Lakhna blows the wall of house with gas cylinder and they all escape in a truck. Vakil initially does not let the woman on truck but when she tells her name Indumati Toomar and her village, he lets her climb.

Reaching their next stop, Indumati's family arrives, including her husband and teenage son and tries to take both of them away. At the same time, Vakil Singh agrees to let her go, as he is the one who sent for them. Indumati reveals that she killed her father in law because he had been raping Sonchiriya and had put her life in risk. Lakhna revolts and disagrees, he takes Vakil's brother as hostage. In this melee, Indumati's son kills Vakil's brother. Lakhna and the team, along with Indumati and Sonchiriya, escape and Vakil Singh vows to hunt them down and kill them all.

While crossing the Chambal River, Lakhna tells Indumati a background story about a curse of killing innocent children inside a room by mistake which led to the Baaghis' whole group being killed one by one. They need to find Sonchiriya (a metaphor for a 'Saviour Girl') to get rid of the curse. In order to reach hospital, Lakhna and group captures an influential person, whom they present to Mallah gang's head Phuilya. After killing him Phuilya helps gang through but they are ambushed at ruins by police.

Vakil Singh finds out that Maan Singh looted the dowry house to save Lacchu's father from inspector Gujjar knowing very well that it was a trap to kill them. Gujjar had taken him hostage and promised to free him only if Lacchu brings Baaghis to that village for the police to kill all Baaghis at once and get the reward from the government.

Vakil arrives with his gang at the ruins and help Lakhna escape with Indumati and Sonchiriya. Lakhna is shot in abdomen but he tried to get the girls to hospital but they are confronted by Indumati's son who wants to kill his mother to avenge his grand father. Lakhna tells him that his grandfather raped his mother and was his biological father.

While the girl is being hospitalized, Lakhna, who, being chased by Gujjar, was hiding behind the tree, comes out to surrender as his task of saving Sonchiriya was finished. But by the curse, Lakhna is shot dead by Gujjar.

In the aftermath, it is revealed that Vakil Singh has actually been killed by the police at the railway station, as his corpse is loaded in a tractor. Later, while traveling towards the police station after killing Lakhna, Gujjar is shot and killed by one of his Thakur constable whose uncle (another constable with him in his gypsy) was earlier assaulted and insulted by him.

== Cast ==
- Manoj Bajpayee as Man Singh
- Sushant Singh Rajput as Lakhan "Lakhna" Singh
- Bhumi Pednekar as Indumati Tomar
- Ashutosh Rana as Virendra Singh Gujjar
- Ranvir Shorey as Vakil Singh
- Lankesh Bhardwaj as Inspector Fort
- Khushiya as Sonchiriya
- Wolf Rajput as Veer
- Jaspal Sharma as Lachchu
- Gagan Dev Riar as Khalifa
- Ram Naresh Diwakar as Natthi
- Mahesh Balraj as Bhoora
- Mukesh Gour as Sheetla
- Harish Khanna as Kok Singh
- Shridhar Dubey as Badlu Songh
- Abhimanyu Arun as Balak Ram
- Sampa Mandal as Phuliya
- Satya Ranjan as Veera
- V K Sharma as Pujari at temple.

== Production ==
The principal photography for the film began on 19 January 2018 in Chambal. On 1 April 2018, the shoot was wrapped up.

== Soundtrack ==
Sonchiriya

Soundtrack album by Vishal Bhardwaj
- Released: 20 February 2019
- Recorded: 2018
- Genre: Feature film soundtrack
- Length: 30:17
- Language: Hindi
- Label: Zee Music Company

Vishal Bhardwaj chronology
Pataakha (2018)	Sonchiriya (2019)
External audio
- Official Audio Jukebox on YouTube

The music of the film has been composed by Vishal Bhardwaj, while the lyrics have been written by Varun Grover except one song, "Naina Na Maar" (lyrics by Ashok Mizaj Badr).

Track listing
No.	Title	Singer(s)	Length
1.	"Baaghi Re"	Mame Khan	4:42
2.	"Sonchiraiya"	Rekha Bhardwaj	5:08
3.	"Ruan Ruan"	Arijit Singh	3:41
4.	"Naina Na Maar"	Sukhwinder Singh, Rekha Bhardwaj	3:48
5.	"Saanp Khavega"	Sukhwinder Singh	4:01
6.	"Sonchiraiya" (Reprise)	Rekha Bhardwaj	4:59
7.	"Baaghi Re" (Remix)	Mame Khan	3:58
Total length:			30:17

== Release ==
The film was released on 1 March 2019. Unlike Udta Punjab, Abhishek Chaubey has a smooth ride with Sonchiriya as CBFC retains most of the abuses. British Board of Film Classification has certified the film with runtime of 143 minutes and the film is set for release. The film was released on 1 March 2019 to 720 screens in India and 220 screens in overseas circuit, making it 940 screens worldwide. The leading actor Sushant Singh Rajput was disappointed that many theaters used unofficial dubbed version of the movie.

== Reception ==
=== Critical response ===
As per Rotten Tomatoes, the film has a score of 80% based on 10 reviews with an average rating of 6.8/10. Raja Sen reviewing the film in Hindustan Times rated the film with three stars out of five. He liked the lead cast in role of bandits but feels that the slow pace kept the film from becoming a great film. Saibal Chatterjee of NDTV gave it three and half stars out of five and praising the acting of the whole cast he says "Cast Live And Breathe Their Roles". Renuka Vyavahare writing for The Times of India gave three and half stars out of five and writes "Gripping, tense and unpredictable, despite being a slow-burn western, Chaubey's period thriller makes for a riveting watch." Taran Adarsh giving three and half stars out of five feels that it is a very well-made film but caters to a niche audience. Anupama Chopra of Film Companion gives three stars out of five and summarize the review as "A Stunningly Shot, Masterfully Staged Fusion Of Caste, Violence And Jungle Law."

== Accolades ==
Award (Note: Awards, festivals and organizations are in Alphabetical order.)	Date of ceremony (Note: Date is linked to the article about the awards held that year, wherever possible.)	Category	Recipient(s)	Result	Ref.
Filmfare Awards	15 February 2020	Best Film (Critics)	Abhishek Chaubey (Note: Tied with Anubhav Sinha for Article 15.)	Won	
Filmfare Awards	15 February 2020	Best Actress (Critics)	Bhumi Pednekar	Nominated	
Filmfare Awards	15 February 2020	Best Supporting Actor	Ranvir Shorey	Nominated	
Filmfare Awards	15 February 2020	Best Story	Abhishek Chaubey and Sudip Sharma	Nominated	
Filmfare Awards	15 February 2020	Best Screenplay	Sudip Sharma	Nominated	
Filmfare Awards	15 February 2020	Best Dialogue	Sudip Sharma	Nominated	
Filmfare Awards	15 February 2020	Best Cinematography	Anuj Rakesh Dhawan	Nominated	
Filmfare Awards	15 February 2020	Best Production Design	Rita Ghosh	Nominated	
Filmfare Awards	15 February 2020	Best Sound Design	Kunal Sharma	Nominated	
Filmfare Awards	15 February 2020	Best Action	Anton Moon and Sunil Rodrigues	Nominated	
Filmfare Awards	15 February 2020	Best Costume Design	Divya Gambhir and Nidhi Gambhir	Won	
FOI Online Awards	11 February 2020	Best Feature Film	Ronnie Screwvala	Nominated	
FOI Online Awards	11 February 2020	Best Director	Abhishek Chaubey	Nominated	
FOI Online Awards	11 February 2020	Best Actor	Sushant Singh Rajput	Nominated	
FOI Online Awards	11 February 2020	Best Supporting Actor	Ranvir Shorey	Won	
FOI Online Awards	11 February 2020	Best Original Screenplay	Sudip Sharma & Abhishek Chaubey	Nominated	
FOI Online Awards	11 February 2020	Best Dialogues	Sudip Sharma	Nominated	
FOI Online Awards	11 February 2020	Best Performance by an Ensemble Cast	Cast of Sonchiriya	Won	
FOI Online Awards	11 February 2020	Best Cinematography	Anuj Rakesh Dhawan	Nominated	
FOI Online Awards	11 February 2020	Best Editing	Meghna Sen	Nominated	
FOI Online Awards	11 February 2020	Best Sound Design	Kunal Sharma & Anil Radhakrishnan	Nominated	
FOI Online Awards	11 February 2020	Best Background Score	Benedict Taylor & Naren Chandavarkar	Nominated	
FOI Online Awards	11 February 2020	Best Music Direction	Vishal Bhardwaj	Nominated	
FOI Online Awards	11 February 2020	Best Original Song	Vishal Bhardwaj & Varun Grover for "Ruan Ruan"	Nominated	
FOI Online Awards	11 February 2020	Best Lyricist	Varun Grover for "Ruan Ruan"	Nominated	
FOI Online Awards	11 February 2020	Best Female Playback Singer	Rekha Bhardwaj for "Ruan Ruan"	Nominated	
FOI Online Awards	11 February 2020	Best Production Design	Rita Gosh	Nominated	
FOI Online Awards	11 February 2020	Best Makeup & Hairstyling	Shrikant Desai	Won	
FOI Online Awards	11 February 2020	Best Visual Effects	Vishal Kapoor (Prime Focus Ltd)	Nominated	
FOI Online Awards	11 February 2020	Best Action Direction	Anton Moon & Sunil Rodrigues	Nominated	
FOI Online Awards	11 February 2020	Special Jury Mention	Bhumi Pednekar	Won	
Mirchi Music Awards	19 February 2020	Best Background Score	Benedict Taylor & Naren Chandavarkar	Nominated	
