= Clean Slate Filmz =

Film production and distribution company

- Type: Private
- Industry: Entertainment
- Founded: October 2013
- Founder: Anushka Sharma; Karnesh Ssharma
- Headquarters: Mumbai, Maharashtra, India
- Key people: Karnesh Ssharma
- Products: Films, Web Series
- Services: Film production, distribution
- Website: cleanslatefilmz.com

Clean Slate Filmz (Previously known as Clean Slate Films) is an Indian film production and distribution company established by actress Anushka Sharma and her brother Karnesh Ssharma in October 2013. Based in Mumbai, it mainly produces and distributes Hindi films and web series.

== Overview ==
=== Early years ===
Co-founded in September 2013 by Anushka Sharma and her brother Karnesh Sharma, Clean Slate Filmz was set up with the single-minded intention of producing movies that the sibling duo "believe in and the audience loves, while backing exciting hot new talent." Karnesh added, "Our first project, NH10 is taking shape so well, that it gave us a lot of confidence to put things into 5th gear under our banner."

Their debut venture, the crime-thriller NH10 was a co-production between Clean Slate Filmz and Phantom Films, distributed by Eros International. The film dealt with a married couple in Gurgaon who decide to take a road trip, and instead endanger their lives by intervening in an incident of honor killing. Anushka Sharma played the lead role alongside actor Neil Bhoopalam, Darshan Kumar and Deepti Naval. The film was directed by Navdeep Singh, and written by Sudip Sharma. Released on 13 March 2015, on a budget of about US$2.1 million, NH10 was declared a sleeper hit, raking in approximately US$5.1 million worldwide at the box office. The film was screened at the Beijing International Film Festival where it was warmly received and widely appreciated.

=== Further productions ===
Following the success of their maiden production venture NH10, Clean Slate Filmz released their next production Phillauri, a romantic comedy directed by Anshai Lal and starring Anushka Sharma in the lead alongside Diljit Dosanjh, Suraj Sharma and Mehreen Pirzada. It opened to positive to mixed reviews and was a modest box office success.

They next produced Pari, a supernatural horror film directed by Prosit Roy in his debut. It stars Anushka Sharma, with Parambrata Chatterjee, Ritabhari Chakraborty, Rajat Kapoor and Mansi Multani featuring in supporting roles. The film received generally positive reviews for Sharma's performance and praising for the makers for doing a movie on this genre.

Clean Slate Filmz next produced a web series, a cop drama titled Paatal Lok, written and created by Sudip Sharma. The series is in collaboration with Amazon and was hosted on Amazon Prime on 15 May 2020 to positive reviews.

The same year, their production Bulbbul, which released on Netflix on 24 June 2020, received positive reviews from the critics and the audience with a particular praise for its stand on feminism, visual effects, background music, and performance of the leads, especially Tripti Dimri.

Their latest production Mai: A Mother's Rage released on 15 April 2022 on Netflix. The series, created by Atul Mongia and directed by Anshai Lal, follows a story of a grieving mother who discovers the criminals behind her daughter's tragic death, and transforms from meek to merciless to get the real cause behind death.

Clean Slate Filmz be producing two Netflix films. The first one is titled Qala which will be the debut of Irrfan's son Babil Khan in films. The second film is titled Chakda 'Xpress, a biopic about cricketer Jhulan Goswami which will be portrayed by Anushka Sharma.

== Productions ==
Key
†	Denotes films that have not yet been released

=== Films ===
Year	Title	Director	Distributor
2015	NH10	Navdeep Singh	Eros International
2017	Phillauri	Anshai Lal	Fox Star Studios
2018	Pari	Prosit Roy	Pooja Entertainment; Zee Studios International
2020	Bulbbul	Anvita Dutt	Netflix
2022	Qala	Anvita Dutt	Netflix
Unreleased	Chakda 'Xpress †	Prosit Roy	AA Films; Reliance Entertainment

=== Television ===
Year	Title	Creator	Network
2020–present	Paatal Lok	Sudip Sharma	Amazon Prime Video
2022	Mai: A Mother's Rage	Atul Mongia	Netflix
2023-present	Kohrra	Sudip Sharma	Netflix
