= Yaar Meri Zindagi =

- Poster
- Directed by: Ashok Gupta
- Written by: V K Sharma
- Starring: Amitabh Bachchan; Shatrughan Sinha; Sharada; Sudha Chandran
- Cinematography: K. K. Mahajan
- Music by: R. D. Burman
- Release date: 22 April 2008
- Country: India
- Language: Hindi

Yaar Meri Zindagi is a 2008 Indian Hindi-language action film directed by Ashok Gupta, starring Amitabh Bachchan, Shatrughan Sinha and South actresses Sharada and Sudha Chandran. The film had only a limited release of 20 prints in Mumbai and other parts of Maharashtra.

== Cast ==
- Amitabh Bachchan as Dr Ajay Singh
- Shatrughan Sinha as Thakur Vikram Singh
- Sharada as Radha / Heerabai
- Sudha Chandran as Shikha Sheikh
- Jalal Agha as Shankara Acharya
- Moolchand as Rajesh
- Iftekar as Daksh Pal
- Chandrashekhar as Veer
- Chand Usmani as Karana Thakur
- Ranjeet Bedi as Thakur
- Iftekhar as Munim
- Aruna Irani as Ajay's sister
- Padma Khanna as Mrs Jodha

== Music ==
1. "Naache Mera Pyar" - Asha Bhosle
2. "Piya Tore Nanoya Ke" - Asha Bhosle
3. "Pyara Ye Rishta Hai Mera" - Asha Bhosle
4. "Raat Ko Akele Mein Baje Mora Kagna" - Kavita Krishnamurthy
5. "Raja Ke Aangna Aaye" - Asha Bhosle
6. "Yaar Meri Zindigi" - Yunus Parvez
7. "Yaar Meri Zindigi v2" - Yunus Parvez, Udit Narayan
8. "Yaar Meri Zindigi v3" - Sadhana Sargam, Ranjana Joglekar, Mohammed Aziz, Bhupinder Singh

== Production ==
The shooting for the film started in the year 1976 and was initially directed by Mukul Dutt, but he left the project in 1984 after having numerous problems and creative differences. Then Ashok Gupta took over the mantle as director in 1998 and completed it within a year, but he too had issues in releasing the film.
