= Prosit Roy =

Indian film director

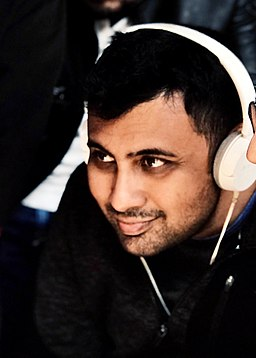
- Born: Kolkata, India
- Occupations: Director, producer
- Years active: 2008

Prosit Roy is an Indian film director, producer and screenwriter. He made his directorial debut in the supernatural horror film Pari (2018), starring Anushka Sharma, for her production company Clean Slate Films.

== Early life ==
Roy was born and brought up in Kolkata, India. Roy belongs to a culturally rooted Bengali family. He hails from a family of performers starting with his grandfather, Pronab Roy, who was a writer and a lyricist. His father is a music professional, and his mother is a dance performer who has performed with Uday Shankar in the past. He completed his schooling from Nava Nalanda High School in South Kolkata and earned a Bachelor of Commerce (B.com) from the prestigious South City College. He is a graduate of the University of Calcutta.

== Career ==
Roy's interest for story telling in his formative years led him to explore the film industry in Kolkata. Driven by his passion for feature films and the desire to reach a wider audience he moved to Mumbai to work on professional film sets for training.

Roy has worked with many directors in the past and production houses. He has worked as a director alongside Bollywood big names like Vishal Bhardwaj, Ashutosh Gowariker, Rakeysh Omprakash Mehra and Abbas Tyrewala just to name a few. Prosit Roy made his Bollywood debut with the 2008 film Jaane Tu... Ya Jaane Na as an assistant director.

Roy directed a short film, Bloody Mustache in 2015. Made on a shoestring budget, Bloody Mustache won acclaim and accolades at various domestic and international film festivals including the New York Indian Film Festival. He then moved on to direct Pari – a horror film starring Anushka Sharma, produced by her company Clean Slate Filmz in 2018. The film won acclaim and was touted to be a trendsetter in the horror film genre of Bollywood. He also co-directed the Amazon Original crime thriller web series "Paatal Lok", which released on 15 May 2020 along with Avinash Arun, created by Sudip Sharma and produced by Anushka Sharma's Clean Slate Filmz. The web series has been touted as "the best Indian web-series" and won rave reviews across the critics and audience. It won the Filmfare OTT Awards for Best Series among other accolades.

== Nominations and awards ==
Prosit Roy has been nominated for the Star Screen Awards, Filmfare Awards & by Zee Cine Awards in 2019 as the Most Promising Debut Director & Best Debut Director for his movie Pari (2018). He won the Filmfare OTT Awards for Best Director for the series "Paatal Lok" in 2021.

== Filmography ==
Year	Title	Director	Assistant Director	Associate Director	Producer	Writer
2008	Jaane Tu... Ya Jaane Na	No	Yes	No	No	No
2009	What's your Raashee	No	Yes	No	No	No
2010	Khelein Hum Jee Jaan Sey	No	Yes	No	No	No
2013	Ek Thi Daayan	No	No	Yes	No	No
2015	All Is Well	No	No	Yes	No	No
2015	Bloody Moustache	Yes	No	No	Yes	Yes
2017	Phillauri	No	Yes	Yes	No	No
2018	Pari	Yes	No	No	No	Yes
TBA	Chakda 'Xpress	Yes	No	No	No	No

== Series ==
Year	Title	Director	Producer	Writer	Online Streaming Platform
2015	Tanlines	Yes	No	Yes	Sony Liv
2020	Paatal Lok	Yes	No	No	Amazon Prime
