= V K Sharma =

Indian actor, director and writer (born 1949)

Vinod Kumar Sharma
- Born: 1949 (age 76–77); Delhi, India
- Education: National School of Drama
- Occupations: Actor; writer; director; acting trainer
- Years active: 1972-present
- Spouse: Kiran Sharma (m. 1989)
- Children: 1
- Awards: Sangeet Natak Akademi Award (2005)

Vinod Kumar Sharma is an Indian actor, writer and director who works in Hindi films, television and stage. He is the recipient of a Sangeet Natak Akademi Award for direction in theatre. He is the founder and director of Khilona Theatre Company, since September 1987. It's India's first professional company of adults performing for children.

== Personal life ==
Sharma was born and brought up in Delhi. He is an alumnus of National School of Drama. He has been married to Kiran Sharma, since 1989. The couple has a son named Kashish Sharma. Kiran is a costume designer, director, playwright and actress. She has directed many plays with Khilona Theatre group. She also serves as the co-director of Khilona Theatre group.

== Filmography ==
Key
†	Denotes film that have not yet been released

Year	Title	Actor	Director	Writer	Notes & Ref(s)	
1982	Gandhi	Yes				Yes
1999	Bhanwar	Yes			Television serial	
2001	Mujhe Kucch Kehna Hai	Yes				
2001	Ji Mantriji	Yes			Television show	
2002	Jasoos Vijay	Yes			Television show	
2003	Hazaaron Khwaishein Aisi	Yes				
2006	Khosla Ka Ghosla	Yes				
2008	Yaar Meri Zindagi			Yes		
2009	London Dreams	Yes				
2010	Milenge Milenge	Yes				
2013	Fukrey	Yes				
2015	Tevar	Yes				
2015	Dum Laga Ke Haisha	Yes				
2016	Dev Bhoomi	Yes				
2017	Kuldip Patwal: I didn’t do it	Yes				
2017	Walk to the Horizon	Yes			Short film	
2019	Kasaai	Yes				
2019	Sonchiriya	Yes				
2019	Ashes	Yes			Short film	
2020	Paatal Lok	Yes			Amazon Prime Video original series	
2021	Samvaran †	Yes				
