= Anshai Lal =

Indian Hindi-language film director

- Born: New Delhi, India
- Occupations: Director and producer
- Years active: 2005–present

Anshai Lal is an Indian Hindi film director and producer. He made his directorial debut with Phillauri, starring Anushka Sharma, Diljit Dosanjh, Suraj Sharma, Mehreen Pirzada, which released worldwide on 24 March 2017. The movie was produced by Clean Slate Films and Fox Star Studios. His work as a Director And Executive Producer includes Mai (2022), starring Sakshi Tanwar, a highly acclaimed Netflix show. He is also the creative producer on the feature films Bulbbul (2020) and Qala (2022)

== Career ==
Anshai Lal was always interested in creative arts from a very young age and was actively involved in the dramatics society of his school. He decided to shift to Mumbai in early 2005 right after his graduation where he started his career as an assistant director to Saket Chaudhary for the box office success Pyaar Ke Side Effects (2006), followed by Shimit Amin for the Indian sports film Chak De! India (2007). Anshai has also assisted for Dostana (2008), Housefull (2010) and Himmatwala (2013).

Anshai made his debut as a director with Phillauri, a romantic comedy set in Phillaur, Punjab. The film released worldwide on 24 March 2017.

Anshai Lal is also the Creative Producer on Bulbbul (2020) and Qala (2020), both highly critically acclaimed feature films were directed by Anvita Dutt.

His next venture as a Director and Executive Producer was Mai (2022), produced by Clean slate Films.

== Personal life ==
Anshai was born and brought up in New Delhi where he completed his schooling from Delhi Public School, Mathura Road and graduation in Bachelors of Journalism and Mass Communication from Indraprastha University.

== Filmography ==
=== As director ===
Year	Title	Release date	Production House	Cast
2017	Phillauri	24 March	Clean Slate Films; Fox Star Studios	Anushka Sharma, Diljit Dosanjh, Suraj Sharma, Mehreen Pirzada
2022	Mai: A Mother's Rage	15 April	Clean Slate Filmz; Netflix	Sakshi Tanwar, Wamiqa Gabbi, Raima Sen, Prashant Narayanan

=== As executive producer ===
Year	Title	Release date	Production House	Cast
2022	Mai: A Mother's Rage	15 April	Clean Slate Filmz; Netflix	Sakshi Tanwar, Wamiqa Gabbi, Raima Sen, Prashant Narayanan

=== As creative producer ===
- Bulbbul (2020)
- Qala (2022)

=== As assistant director ===
Year	Title	Director
2006	Pyaar Ke Side Effects	Saket Chaudhary
2007	Chak De! India	Shimit Amin
2008	Dostana	Tarun Mansukhani
2010	Housefull	Sajid Khan
2013	Himmatwala	Sajid Khan
