= Chakda 'Xpress =

Unreleased Hindi film

- Directed by: Prosit Roy
- Written by: Abhishek Banerjee
- Produced by: Saurabh Malhotra; Karnesh Ssharma
- Starring: Anushka Sharma; Anshul Chauhan; Atul Sharma; Dibyendu Bhattacharya; Renuka Shahane; Karan Arvind Bendre; Shamal Rokade; Yogesh Soman
- Cinematography: Pratik Shah
- Edited by: Manas Mittal
- Production companies: T-Series Films; Clean Slate Filmz
- Distributed by: Netflix
- Country: India
- Language: Hindi

Chakda 'Xpress is an unreleased Hindi-language biographical sport drama film written by Abhishek Banerjee, directed by Prosit Roy and produced by Karnesh Ssharma under the banner of Clean Slate Filmz. It stars Anushka Sharma, Dibyendu Bhattacharya, Renuka Shahane, Anshul Chauhan, Koushik Sen, Mahesh Thakur.

The film is a biopic of Jhulan Goswami.

== Cast ==
- Anushka Sharma as Jhulan Goswami
- Atul Sharma as Head of International Cricket Council
- Ahmareen Anjum as Nita Singh
- Simon Johnson Cricket Umpire UK
- George Elliott Cricket Umpire UK
- Bharat Mistri as Cricket Spectator
- Manoj Anand as Cricket Spectator
- Dave Bannister as Cricket Spectator
- Dibyendu Bhattacharya
- Diya Jandu as Cricket Spectator
- Elizabeth Ansari as Cricket Spectator
- Hamza Butt as Cricket Spectator
- Haroon Rafiq as Cricket Spectator
- Parvinder Kaur as Cricket Spectator
- Renuka Shahane
- Sammy Jonas Heaney as Cricket Steward
- Sofia Price as Cricket Spectator
- Dax Sowrey as Cricket Umpire
- Gareth Bottomley as Cricket Umpire
- Richard Williams as Cricket Umpire
- Kate Coppack as Cricket Player
- Lizzie Williams as Cricket Player
- Mollie Ovenden as Cricket Player
- Zoe Sawula as Cricket Player
- Berry Clarkson as Cricket Player
- Ellie Toogood as Cricket Player
- Joseph Holt as Cricket Player
- Rina Bhudia as Cricket Player

== Plot ==
The movie was depicted the life of the Indian woman cricketer Jhulan Goswami and her struggle.

== Production ==
=== Filming ===
Principal photography began on 19 June 2022. The team wrapped up on 26 December 2022.
