= Udta Punjab =

2016 Indian film by Abhishek Chaubey

- Theatrical release poster
- Directed by: Abhishek Chaubey
- Written by: Sudip Sharma; Abhishek Chaubey
- Produced by: Shobha Kapoor; Ekta Kapoor; Anurag Kashyap; Vikramaditya Motwane; Aman Gill; Vikas Bahl; Madhu Mantena
- Starring: Shahid Kapoor; Alia Bhatt; Kareena Kapoor Khan; Diljit Dosanjh
- Cinematography: Rajeev Ravi
- Edited by: Meghna Manchanda Sen
- Music by: Original Songs: Amit Trivedi; Background Score: Benedict Taylor; Naren Chandavarkar
- Production companies: Balaji Motion Pictures; Phantom Films
- Distributed by: Balaji Motion Pictures
- Release date: 17 June 2016
- Running time: 147 minutes
- Country: India
- Languages: Punjabi; Hindi
- Budget: ₹34 crore
- Box office: est. ₹96.1–100 crore

Udta Punjab (transl. Flying Punjab) is a 2016 Indian crime drama film written and directed by Abhishek Chaubey, co-written by Sudip Sharma, and produced by Shobha Kapoor, Ekta Kapoor, Sameer Nair and Aman Gill under Balaji Motion Pictures in association with Anurag Kashyap, Vikas Bahl and Vikramaditya Motwane under Phantom Films. Loosely based on and revolving around the drug abuse by the youth population in the Indian state of Punjab and the various conspiracies surrounding it, the film stars an ensemble cast of Shahid Kapoor, Alia Bhatt, Kareena Kapoor Khan and Diljit Dosanjh.

The film faced pre-release controversy, particularly from the Central Board of Film Certification (CBFC) and some political figures in Punjab, who accused it of defaming the state by exaggerating or misrepresenting the drug crisis ahead of the 2017 Punjab Legislative Assembly election. Post-release, the film was generally well-received for highlighting a genuine public health issue, though some critics and commentators argued that it overemphasised addiction among ethnic Punjabi youth. On 4 June 2016, the Central Board of Film Certification, India sought a stay on the film's release citing that the themes dealt with in the film were too vulgar for the general audience. As a result, the producers were directed to make a total of 89 cuts in the film. However, on 13 June 2016, the Bombay High Court struck down the stay and gave permission for the film's national release, albeit with a single cut in the screenplay. The film was released worldwide on 17 June 2016. Made on a budget of ₹340 million (US$3.5 million), Udta Punjab was a commercial success and earned approximately ₹960 million (US$10 million) worldwide. It received acclaim from critics, with praise for its direction, story, screenplay, music and performances of the cast.

At the 62nd Filmfare Awards, Udta Punjab received a leading 9 nominations, including Best Film, Best Director (Chaubey), Best Actor (Shahid Kapoor), Best Supporting Actress (Kapoor Khan) and Best Supporting Actor (Dosanjh), and won 4 awards including Best Actress (Bhatt) and Best Actor (Critics) (Shahid Kapoor).

== Background ==
Studies indicate that while migrant labourers from states such as Bihar and Uttar Pradesh (who comprise a significant portion of manual workers in Punjab) are disproportionately affected in certain low-wage sectors—sometimes exploited by employers providing drugs to extend working hours—the majority of opioid-dependent individuals in the state are local residents, including educated and employed ethnic Punjabis. Notably, one of the film's central characters (played by Alia Bhatt) is a Bihari migrant labourer who falls into addiction and exploitation, reflecting this aspect of the crisis. Punjab has one of India's highest per-capita rates of opioid dependence (approximately 0.84% in 2015, roughly four times the national average), with the state ranking second nationally (after Uttar Pradesh) in absolute numbers of opioid users and among the top states for prevalence of illicit opioids and injection drug use.

== Plot ==
Three Pakistani youth throw packets of drugs across the border to India for it to be picked up later. Tejinder "Tommy" Singh, better known as "Gabru" among his fans, is a young and successful Punjabi musician who lives a luxurious lifestyle. Together with an ostentatious crew led by his uncle Tayaji and cousin Jassi, he routinely indulges in cocaine consumption. Tommy is popular for his energetic songs with lyrics that often glorify violence and drug addiction. However, his addiction costs him his music contract and lands him in jail. While in prison, he meets two of his die-hard fans who remark how Tommy's lifestyle had 'inspired' theirs, leading them to murder their own mother for drug money. Realizing that his songs have negatively affected teenagers, Tommy decides to change his ways upon release. A few days later, he engages in an altercation and inadvertently shoots Tayaji, injuring his ear. This causes Tayaji to send Tommy and his crew away to a farmhouse so that he can prepare for an upcoming concert.

Working on the farm is a migrant worker from Bihar nicknamed Bauria, whose dreams of playing national-level hockey for the country were shattered due to her father's death, pushing her to Punjab to work as a laborer. She works for a local landlord who uses agriculture as a front for drug-peddling. One night, she finds a suspicious packet on the farm and realizes that it is some kind of a drug. She resolves to sell it but her search for a potential buyer lands her in trouble as she unwittingly contacts the original owners of the heroin. She is captured by the gang of drug peddlers but not before she discards it into a well. As a compensation for their lost drugs, the peddlers forcibly keep her at their house, where she is sexually and physically abused, given drugs, and pimped to men. Some weeks later, she manages to escape.

Over in the neighboring town lives Preet Sahni, a doctor and activist who runs a rehabilitation center. Sartaj Singh is a junior policeman who knows about the drug smuggling his seniors are allowing on a large scale. But when it affects his family, as his brother, Balli, overdoses and is brought to Preet's clinic, he realizes the grave situation. Preet and Sartaj decide to find the root cause of the problem together. Balli is admitted into her drug rehabilitation centre against his will.

At his concert, instead of singing, Tommy starts preaching. Infuriated by his speech about how one should lead one's life, his fans start throwing bottles at him. The angered Tommy urinates in front of the crowd before fleeing. He hides in an old structure and meets Bauria, also hiding. The two share their stories and bond. However, Bauria is recaptured by the same gang when she defends Tommy from being attacked by them. He learns the next day that an arrest warrant has been issued for him because of the public ruckus at the concert, and sets out to find Bauria after realising his feelings for her.

Preet and Sartaj find that the driving force behind the drug problem in Punjab is an elderly man called Virender Singh, who has flourished with the support of his father-in-law, MP Maninder Brar. The two go to extreme measures to collect evidence against the politician and put together a report to be sent to the state's Election Commission to thwart Brar's campaign for another term in power. Sartaj and Preet fall in love; however, one night, Preet sees a manic Balli trying to escape from her rehab center. On trying to stop him, she is accidentally stabbed in the neck by him. As Balli is Sartaj's brother, senior officer Jhujar Singh who investigates the homicide decides to send him underground. While falsifying the crime scene he comes across the report made by her and Sartaj, and is infuriated when he sees that he too has been named in the drug racket. He calls Sartaj and knocks him out when he arrives.

Waking up in the presence of the local drug mafia at their farmhouse, where Bauria is also confined, a bruised and beaten Sartaj is questioned by Jhujar, who is a key member in the drug racket. Sartaj says whatever he did was for the sake of Punjab. At the same time, Tommy enters the house, armed with a hockey stick. Taking advantage of the distraction, Sartaj grabs Jhujar's gun and shoots the whole gang before freeing Balli. Tommy helps Bauria escape from her captors. Balli kneels and cries in front of his brother, whose face is expressionless.

Eventually, it is shown that the government issued an inquiry into Brar's activities and there has been a huge crackdown on the drug menace. Over in Goa, amidst his crew members, Tommy calls Bauria to ask for her real name. Sitting by the beach, she catches sight of a foreigner having fun. Inspired, she says "Mary Jane", to which Tommy flirtatiously replies that she is his "life", and she ends the call before going for a swim. (Note: According to the director, "Mary Jane", as the name of Bhatt's character, is an allusion to the drug marijuana.)

== Cast ==
- Shahid Kapoor as Tejinder "Tommy" Singh a.k.a. Gabru
- Alia Bhatt as Kumari Pinky, Bauria a.k.a. Mary Jane.
- Kareena Kapoor Khan as Dr. Preet Sahni
- Diljit Dosanjh as ASI Sartaj Singh
- Satish Kaushik as Tayaji, Jassi's father and Tommy's uncle
- Suhail Nayyar as Jassi, Tayaji's son and Tommy's cousin
- Prabhjyot Singh as Balli Singh
- Jaswinder Kaur as Sartaj's mother
- Manav Vij as Jhujar Singh, Sartaj's senior officer
- Mahabir Bhullar as Veerji

== Planning and filming ==
Priyanka Chopra was initially approached for the lead female role. Later, Parineeti Chopra was in talks for the same part. Principal photography of the film commenced in March 2015, Three of the actors Shahid Kapoor, Alia Bhatt and Kareena Kapoor Khan halved their fees for the film.

The film marked the sixth collaboration between Shahid Kapoor and Kareena Kapoor, their first since Jab We Met (2007), though the two do not share any scenes.

== Music ==
The soundtrack for Udta Punjab was composed by Amit Trivedi with lyrics by the late Shiv Kumar Batalvi, Shellee and Varun Grover. The background music was composed by Benedict Taylor and Naren Chandavarkar. The music rights are acquired by Zee Music Company. The first song "Chitta Ve" was released on 4 May 2016. Two more singles "Ikk Kudi" and "Da Da Dasse" were released before the Release of the final soundtrack. The complete soundtrack consisting of 7 songs was released on 16 May 2016.

== Release ==
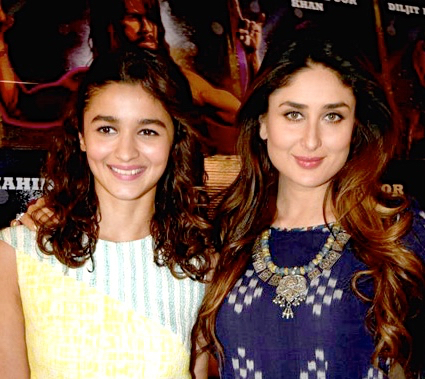
Alia Bhatt and Kareena Kapoor Khan at a promotional event for the film in 2016.

Udta Punjab had been reported to have had issues with the censor board over profanities and scenes of drug use. On 9 June 2016, the Censor Board (CBFC) came out with a list of 94 cuts and 13 pointers prior to the film's release. One of the pointers even included deleting the names of cities in Punjab. On 13 June 2016, Bombay High Court cleared Udta Punjab with one cut and disclaimers. The court ruled that the scene where Tommy Singh (Shahid Kapoor) is shown urinating on a crowd needed to be chopped off. The CBFC was directed to issue an 'A' certificate to Udta Punjab within two days.

=== Censorship issues ===
The row over the film being drug-themed slated for release on 17 June escalated with co-producer Anurag Kashyap hitting out at CBFC head Pahlaj Nihalani calling him "oligarch" and "dictator" and that it was allegedly like living in North Korea. The makers of the film are said to have been asked by the Revising Committee of the Censor Board to remove all references to Punjab and to make 89 cuts. Kashyap got the support of several filmmakers including Karan Johar, Mahesh Bhatt, Ram Gopal Varma, Aamir Khan, Imtiaz Ali, Varun Dhawan and Mukesh Bhatt. "It is a dark day for freedom of expression and creativity in the country," Mukesh Bhatt said, calling Pahlaj Nihalani a "stooge" of the government. It was later cleared by Bombay High Court with the number of cuts reduced from 89 to a single scene, wherein a character is seen urinating on a crowd of people. The Court directed the Board to issue an 'A' certificate before the scheduled release of the movie. According to The Economist, Nihalani "was appointed by the BJP, whose coalition partner in Punjab, the SAD, had much to lose from bad publicity" resulting from the movie, due to a subplot in the film drawing "a parallel with the real-life case of a convicted drug lord who named the SAD deputy chief’s brother-in-law as his accomplice".

In August 2017, soon after his removal as CBFC Chief, Nihalani revealed in an interview that he had received instructions from the Ministry of Information and Broadcasting to block the release of the film.

=== Online piracy issue ===
On 15 June 2016, some parts of the film were leaked online onto various peer-to-peer sharing websites. While some torrent sites hosted torrent files containing a forty-minute clip, the whole film was also uploaded on other media sharing sites like Mega. Indiatimes.com reported that the leaked clips allegedly contained the text "FOR CENSOR" on the top-left corner, implying that the leaked copies were part of the samples shared with the Censor Board. The Huffington Post reported that the producers of the film had filed a complaint with the Cyber Crime cell in Mumbai. It added that Balaji Motion Pictures and Phantom Films, its producers, had succeeded in pulling down as many as 600 links from the web. Commenting on the leak, the film's spokesperson said, "Two copies of the CD were sent to the CBFC and this version is from the same source. It's literally a no-brainer to conclude where the leak has come from and, sure enough, the cyber crime cell will get to the bottom of this."

== Reception ==
Udta Punjab was acclaimed by critics upon release. Meena Iyer of The Times of India gave the film 4.5 stars out of 5. Rajeev Masand of News18 writes "the film is hard-hitting and uncomfortable to watch, and mixes dark humor to a tale about the dirty drug and political nexus in Punjab", giving it 3.5 rating out of 5. Shubhra Gupta of The Indian Express gave the film 3 stars out of 5, saying it is "the kind of film which has something to say, and it says it with both flair and conviction". Sukanya Verma of Rediff.com gave the film 4 stars out of 5, saying "Udta Punjab is a wake-up call, an important film and a mighty impressive one at that, carrying a loud anti-drug message". Rohit Vats of Hindustan Times wrote "Udta Punjab works mostly because of its tone and stand against drugs, though the second half is no match for the first", giving the film 3.5 rating out of 5. Saibal Chatterjee of NDTV gave the film 4 stars out of 5, writing "Udta Punjab is littered with standout scenes, but none matches the sledgehammer impact of the climax". Namrata Joshi of The Hindu described the film as "a gut-wrenching look at the frightening dystopia that is Punjab today owing to rampant drug abuse".

The film was banned in Pakistan by CBFC Pakistan for "use of abusive language."

== Box office ==
Despite the controversial subject Udta Punjab was a commercial success, and became Shahid Kapoor's largest-opening film at the time. It earned approximately ₹10.05 crore (US$1.0 million) in India, with an additional ₹3.46 crore (US$360,000) coming from overseas revenue on its opening day. The film grossed ₹46.94 crore (US$4.9 million) worldwide during its opening weekend and ₹75.82 crore (US$7.9 million) worldwide in its first week. As of 9 July 2016, the film has earned 150 crore (US$16.6 million) worldwide.

== Accolades ==
Award	Date of ceremony	Category	Recipient(s) and nominee(s)	Result	Ref.
Screen Awards	4 December 2016	Best Actress	Alia Bhatt	Won	
Stardust Awards	19 December 2016	Best Story	Abhishek Chaubey, Sudip Sharma	Nominated	
Stardust Awards	19 December 2016	Best Screenplay	Abhishek Chaubey, Sudip Sharma	Won	
Stardust Awards	19 December 2016	Best Actress	Alia Bhatt	Nominated	
Stardust Awards	19 December 2016	Editor's Choice Performer of the Year	Alia Bhatt	Nominated	
Stardust Awards	19 December 2016	Best Actor	Shahid Kapoor	Nominated	
Stardust Awards	19 December 2016	Best Supporting Actress	Kareena Kapoor Khan	Nominated	
Stardust Awards	19 December 2016	Best Male Debut	Diljit Dosanjh	Nominated	
Stardust Awards	19 December 2016	Best Music Director	Amit Trivedi	Nominated	
Stardust Awards	19 December 2016	Best Music Album	Zee Music Company	Nominated	
Filmfare Awards	14 January 2017	Best Film	Udta Punjab	Nominated	
Filmfare Awards	14 January 2017	Best Director	Abhishek Chaubey	Nominated	
Filmfare Awards	14 January 2017	Best Actor	Shahid Kapoor	Nominated	
Filmfare Awards	14 January 2017	Best Actor (Critics)	Shahid Kapoor	Won	
Filmfare Awards	14 January 2017	Best Actress	Alia Bhatt	Won	
Filmfare Awards	14 January 2017	Best Supporting Actress	Kareena Kapoor Khan	Nominated	
Filmfare Awards	14 January 2017	Best Male Debut	Diljit Dosanjh	Won	
Filmfare Awards	14 January 2017	Best Supporting Actor	Diljit Dosanjh	Nominated	
Filmfare Awards	14 January 2017	Best Music Album	Amit Trivedi	Nominated	
Filmfare Awards	14 January 2017	Best Lyricist	Late Shiv Kumar Batalvi (for the song "Ikk Kudi")	Nominated	
Filmfare Awards	14 January 2017	Best Female Playback Singer	Kanika Kapoor (for the song "Da Da Dasse")	Nominated	
Filmfare Awards	14 January 2017	Best Costume Design	Payal Saluja	Won	
Mirchi Music Awards	18 February 2017	Album of the Year	Amit Trivedi, Shiv Kumar Batalvi, Shellee, Varun Grover	Nominated	
Mirchi Music Awards	18 February 2017	Music Composer of the Year	Amit Trivedi (for the song "Ikk Kudi")	Nominated	
Mirchi Music Awards	18 February 2017	Raag-Inspired Song of the Year	"Ikk Kudi"	Nominated	
Zee Cine Awards	11 March 2017	Best Actor – Female	Alia Bhatt	Won	
Zee Cine Awards	11 March 2017	Best Story	Abhishek Chaubey, Sudip Sharma	Nominated	
Zee Cine Awards	11 March 2017	Best Director	Abhishek Chaubey	Nominated	
Zee Cine Awards	11 March 2017	Best Actor – Male	Shahid Kapoor	Nominated	
Zee Cine Awards	11 March 2017	Best Debutant – Male	Diljit Dosanjh	Nominated	
Zee Cine Awards	11 March 2017	Best Supporting Actor – Female	Kareena Kapoor Khan	Nominated	
Zee Cine Awards	11 March 2017	Best Actor In A Comic Role	Satish Kaushik	Nominated	
International Indian Film Academy Awards	14 July 2017	Best Actor in a Leading Role	Shahid Kapoor	Won	
International Indian Film Academy Awards	14 July 2017	Best Actress in a Leading Role	Alia Bhatt	Won	
International Indian Film Academy Awards	14 July 2017	Best Male Debut	Diljit Dosanjh	Won	
International Indian Film Academy Awards	14 July 2017	Best Female Playback Singer	Kanika Kapoor (for the song "Da Da Dasse")	Won	
International Indian Film Academy Awards	14 July 2017	Best Film	Udta Punjab	Nominated	
International Indian Film Academy Awards	14 July 2017	Best Director	Abhishek Chaubey	Nominated	
International Indian Film Academy Awards	14 July 2017	Best Music Direction	Amit Trivedi	Nominated	
International Indian Film Academy Awards	14 July 2017	Best Playback Singer – Male	Diljit Dosanjh (for the song "Ikk Kudi")	Nominated	
BIG Zee Entertainment Awards	29 July 2017	Most Entertaining Social Film	Udta Punjab	Won	
BIG Zee Entertainment Awards	29 July 2017	Most Entertaining Actor in a Social Film – Female	Alia Bhatt	Nominated	
BIG Zee Entertainment Awards	29 July 2017	Most Entertaining Actor (Film) – Female	Alia Bhatt	Won	
BIG Zee Entertainment Awards	29 July 2017	Most Entertaining Actor (Film) – Male	Shahid Kapoor	Won	
BIG Zee Entertainment Awards	29 July 2017	Most Entertaining Actor (Film) Debut – Male	Diljit Dosanjh	Nominated	
BIG Zee Entertainment Awards	29 July 2017	Most Entertaining Music	Amit Trivedi	Nominated	
BIG Zee Entertainment Awards	29 July 2017	Most Entertaining Singer (Female)	Kanika Kapoor (for the song "Da Da Dasse")	Nominated	
B4U Viewers Choice Awards	2017	Best Actress	Kareena Kapoor Khan	Won	
