= Phillauri (film) =

2017 Indian film by Anshai Lal

- Theatrical release poster
- Directed by: Anshai Lal
- Written by: Anvita Dutt Guptan
- Produced by: Anushka Sharma; Karnesh Ssharma; Fox Star Studios
- Starring: Anushka Sharma; Diljit Dosanjh; Suraj Sharma; Mehreen Pirzada
- Cinematography: Vishal Sinha
- Edited by: Rameshwar S. Bhagat
- Music by: Songs: Shashwat Sachdev; Jasleen Royal; Score: Sameer Uddin
- Production companies: Fox Star Studios; Clean Slate Filmz
- Distributed by: Fox Star Studios
- Release date: 24 March 2017 (worldwide)
- Running time: 131 minutes
- Country: India
- Languages: Hindi; Punjabi
- Budget: ₹29 crore
- Box office: est. ₹46.6 crore

Phillauri is a 2017 Indian Hindi-language fantasy-comedy film directed by Anshai Lal and produced by Fox Star Studios with Anushka Sharma and her brother Karnesh Ssharma under their banner of Clean Slate Filmz. Director Navdeep Singh and writer Sudip Sharma are associated with the film as creative producers. The film stars Anushka Sharma, Diljit Dosanjh, Suraj Sharma and Mehreen Pirzada (in her Hindi debut) in the lead roles. The film's first official poster was released on 3 February 2017. The film was released on 24 March 2017. It performed averagely at the box office.

== Plot ==
A young man, Kanan, returns to India from Canada to marry his long-term girlfriend Anu, but learns that he is a Manglik (born under an unlucky star) and has to marry a tree before marrying her. He reluctantly marries the tree, which is duly chopped down after the completion of the ceremony. As a result, from that day onward, he is haunted by the spirit of a woman named Shashi, who lived in the tree and hence claims to now be 'married' to him.

The story of Phillauri and Shashi is slowly revealed via the latter's flashbacks. Back in an unspecified time period, Shashi is a bright young woman who never fails to read the works of a poet named Phillauri that are regularly published in a local weekly. Everyone in the village of Phillaur thinks that the poems are written by the singer Roop Lal 'Phillauri', who is the heartthrob of the village. However, Roop Lal notices that Shashi, unlike all the other village girls, never comes to hear him sing. When he confronts her and tells her that he is the Phillauri who writes the poetry by narrating one of his famous poems to her, he is shocked when Shashi slaps and insults him. She asks him to use his talent – of being able to connect with the common man through his songs – for something important (especially when the struggle for independence is on) and not for frivolous matters. From that day onwards, Roop Lal is a changed man, dedicating his life to knowing and understanding the poetry of Phillauri (which it is clear now that he is not the author of) and spreading its message via his beautiful singing to others.

On one particular night, while Roop Lal is alone at home singing one of Phillauri's poems, Shashi comes to him and reveals that she is the one who writes poetry under the pseudonym of 'Phillauri' (which she can't do openly, being a woman). Subsequently, love blossoms between the two (the poet and the singer who translates her poetry to song and spreads its message far and wide), but Shashi's elder brother (a reputed doctor of the village who brought her up) eventually learns about the affair and intervenes. Roop Lal confronts Shashi's brother and admits to having been an alcohol-addicted good-for-nothing who still is not worthy of her, but tells him that he (Roop Lal) is going to Amritsar to record all the songs written by Shashi and will eventually return and ask for her hand in marriage.

The very fact that Shashi writes poetry is a revelation to her brother, and as time passes, he too reads the poems and starts appreciating her obvious talent. Meanwhile, Roop Lal records the songs in Amritsar (the gramophone record is credited to both) and is paid a handsome fee of three hundred rupees. He immediately sends the entire amount as a money order to Shashi's brother, along with a letter stating his intention to return and marry her on Baisakhi. Shashi's brother, by now convinced of Roop Lal's changed nature and good intentions, as well as the deep love between the couple, starts the preparations for her marriage.

On the day of the wedding, Shashi discovers that she is pregnant but does not disclose the news to anyone except her close friend Amrit (Nidhi Bisht). She expectantly waits for Roop Lal along with all her relatives and the entire village, but eventually the day ends with him nowhere to be seen on any of the buses from Amritsar. Her brother has to face the intense embarrassment and shame of sending everyone away, and this in turn hurts Shashi so much that she commits suicide (by hanging herself from a tree) due to an overwhelming sense of sadness, despair, and betrayal.

In the midst of these flashbacks via Shashi's spirit, the parallel storyline in the present continues with Kanan (whose confused ramblings about seeing a ghost naturally no one believes), ending up in trouble with Anu, who feels that he is not really interested in marrying her (which is partially true since he is getting cold feet). In order to clear the misunderstanding, Shashi finally manages to reveal her presence to Anu as well (though Anu still cannot see her), and having heard her entire painful story, Anu realises that Shashi's spirit is in fact still stuck on the mortal plane due to her unfulfilled love. At that point, Anu's grandmother asks Kanan to say something to his bride, and Shashi prompts him with her poem. Grandma sings a few lines of the same, being her favourite, which, as fate would have it, is the one Roop Lal recorded. The record label mentions the recording date as 1919, which results in an epiphany for Kanan, who immediately takes Anu (with Shashi in tow) to the site of the Jallianwala Bagh massacre, which took place on that very day 98 years ago.

The movie ends with Shashi's spirit reuniting finally with her lover Roop Lal's (who was killed in the massacre on the day of Baisakhi, when he recorded their songs and was to return to marry her). Before they both ascend to heaven, Shashi tells Kanan and Anu (who can now see her) to love and cherish each other always, and that is what they promise each other as they embark on a new phase of their very own love story.

== Cast ==
- Anushka Sharma as Shashi Kumari Gill / Shashi Lal “Phillauri” - Roop Lal's love, Kanan's Technical First Wife (Dead "Phillauri" Spirit) (Few lines as Mona Ghosh Shetty)
- Diljit Dosanjh as Roop Lal "Phillauri" - Shashi's love
- Suraj Sharma as Kanan Gill - Anu's and Shashi's husband
- Mehreen Pirzada as Anu Gill - Kanan's Real but in-effect Second wife
- Manav Vij as Kishan - Shashi's brother
- Nidhi Bisht as Amrit - Shashi's friend
- Shivansh Miyan
- Raza Murad as Gurubaksh Singh
- Hassan Saad as Nikhil
- Shivam Pradhan as Piyush
- Sunil Mehra as Anu's Father
- Suparna Marwah as Anu's Mother
- Salima Raza as Biji
- Hobby Dhaliwal as Kanan's Father
- Shabnam Wadhera as Kanan's Mother
- Abhishek Banerjee as Soma, Roop Lal Phillauri's friend
- Shivam Pradhan as Piyush
- Amrit Pal as Raju
- Samrat Raichand as Soldier
- Hagupreet Singh as Bitoo - Roop Lal admirer
- Kishore Sharma as Panditji

== Production ==
Principal photography of the film commenced in April 2016. The shooting of the film went on floors after the Punjabi festival of Vaisakhi 2016. First day of the shoot was on 19 April 2016.

== Soundtrack ==
Phillauri

Soundtrack album by Shashwat Sachdev and Jasleen Royal
- Released: 6 March 2017
- Recorded: 2016-2017
- Studios: Studio Enzy, CNSO Recording Studios
- Genre: Feature film soundtrack
- Length: 33:54
- Languages: Hindi, Punjabi
- Label: T-Series
- Producers: Shashwat Sachdev, Japji Singh
External audio
- Phillauri Full Album – Audio Jukebox on YouTube

Shashwat Sachdev chronology
Phillauri (2017)	Kaalakaandi (2017)

The music of the film is composed by Shashwat Sachdev with Jasleen Royal as a guest composer while the lyrics have been penned by Anvita Dutt Guptan, Aditya Sharma, Neeraj Rajawat and Shellee. Sameer Uddin has composed the background score. The music rights are acquired by T-Series. The first song "Dum Dum" was released on 16 February 2017. The soundtrack was released on 6 March 2017.

All music is composed by Shashwat Sachdev (except where noted).

Track listing
No.	Title	Lyrics	Singer(s)	Length
1.	"Dum Dum"	Anvita Dutt	Romy, Vivek Hariharan	5:13
2.	"Whats Up" (Music by Jasleen Royal)	Aditya Sharma	Mika Singh, Jasleen Royal	3:04
3.	"Sahiba"	Anvita Dutt	Romy, Pavni Pandey	5:30
4.	"Naughty Billo"	Anvita Dutt	Diljit Dosanjh, Nakash Aziz, Shilpi Paul (Rap: Anushka Sharma)	3:01
5.	"Bajaake Tumba"	Anvita Dutt	Romy, Shehnaz Akhtar	3:18
6.	"Din Shagna Da" (Music by Jasleen Royal)	Neeraj Rajawat	Jasleen Royal	3:36
7.	"Dum Dum (Punjabi Version)"	Shellee	Romy, Vivek Hariharan	6:23
8.	"Dum Dum (Reprise) Diljit Dosanjh Version"	Anvita Dutt	Diljit Dosanjh	3:49
Total length:				33:54

== Critical reception ==
The film received mixed reviews. On review aggregation website Rotten Tomatoes, Phillauri has an approval score of 40% based on 10 reviews with an average rating of 6.1 out of 10.

Nihit Bhave of The Times of India gave the film a rating of 3 out of 5 and said that, "The idea is superbly original, culturally on point and has great potential. The problem is, you only get what you see in the trailer." Sweta Kausal of Hindustan Times gave the film a rating of 2.5 out of 5 saying that, "There is nothing extraordinary about Phillauri. It is a light-hearted, average love story." Saibal Chatterjee of NDTV gave the film a rating of 3 out of 5 saying that, "The film is a lively, lighthearted drama enlivened with some fine cinematic touches." Shubhra Gupta of The Indian Express criticized the film for being too slow saying that, "The pacing is not just languid, it is positively slow, and it allows scenes to go on for much longer than they should." and gave the film a rating of 2 out of 5. Rajeev Masand of News18 praised the performances of actors Suraj Sharma, Diljit Dosanjh and Anushka Sharma but criticized the long length of the film and gave the film a rating of 3 out of 5 saying that, " Phillauri isn’t a consistently smooth ride. It’s uneven and bumpy and unforgivably slow in portions. But a lot of it works and some of it flies."

== Accolades ==
Award Ceremony	Category	Recipient	Result
10th Mirchi Music Awards	Lyricist of The Year	Anvita Dutt for "Sahiba"	Nominated
10th Mirchi Music Awards	Upcoming Music Composer of The Year	Shashwat Sachdev for "Bajaake Tumba"	Nominated
10th Mirchi Music Awards	Upcoming Music Composer of The Year	Shashwat Sachdev for "Sahiba"	Nominated
10th Mirchi Music Awards	Best Song Engineer (Recording & Mixing)	Shadab Rayeen, Shashwat Sachdev, Neeraj Singh, Julian Mascarenhas, Kotzmann Jan & Katzmann Cenda for "Naughty Billo"	Nominated
10th Mirchi Music Awards	Best Background Score		Nominated
Jagran Film Festival	Best VFX Award	Red Chillies Entertainment	Won
