= Abhishek Chaubey =

Indian film director, writer and screenwriter

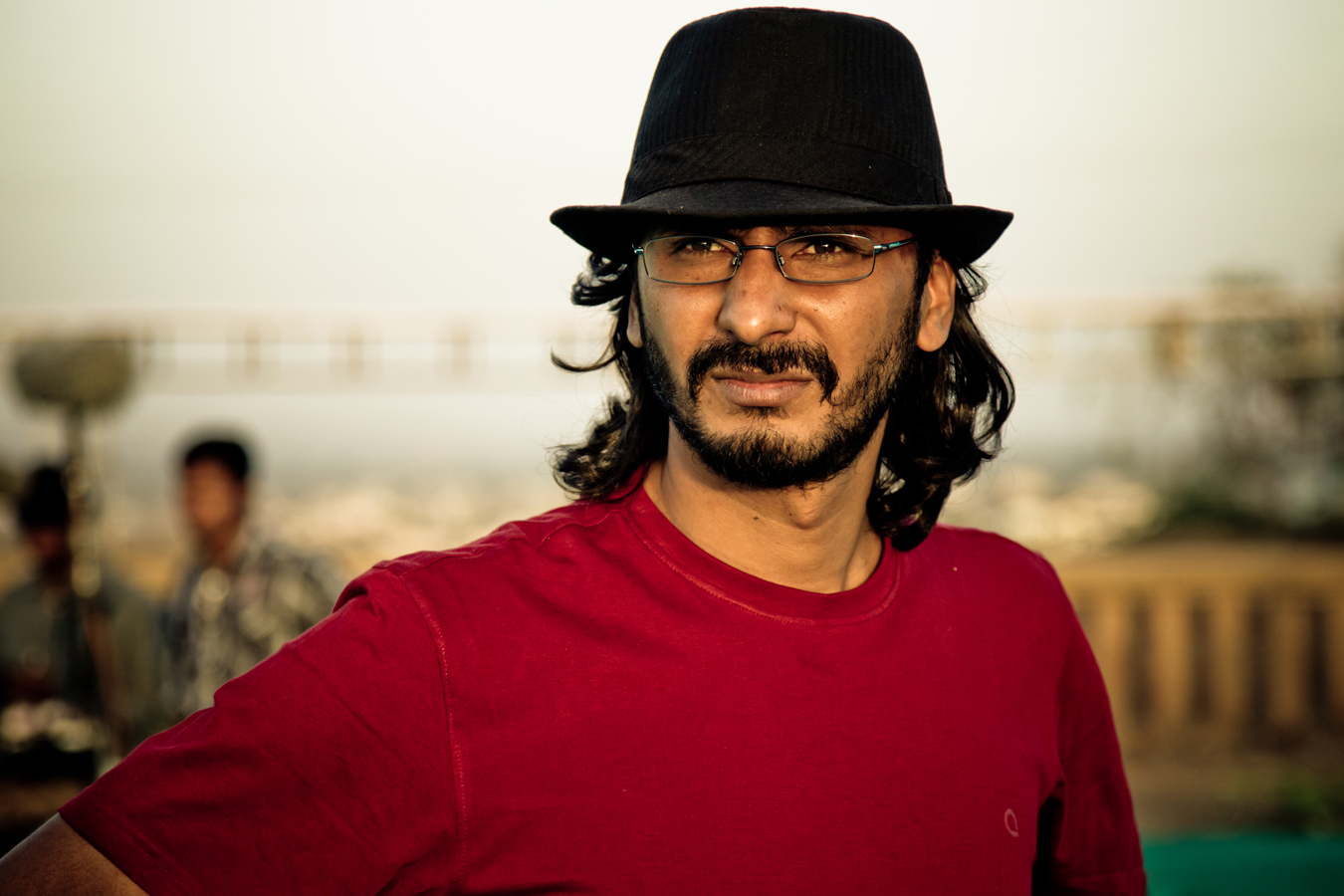
- Born: Ayodhya, Uttar Pradesh, India
- Education: Hindu College, Delhi
- Occupations: Director; screenwriter; film producer
- Years active: 2002–present
- Spouse: Chetana Kowshik (m. 2017)

Abhishek Chaubey is an Indian director, screenwriter and film producer known for his works in Hindi cinema.

== Early life ==
Abhishek Chaubey was born in Ayodhya, Uttar Pradesh to Anand Mohan Chaubey and Sheela Chaubey. He spent his early childhood and adolescence in Jamshedpur, Patna and Ranchi. He completed his 10th standard from St. Xavier's School, Ranchi in the year 1993, completed 12th from Siva Sivani Public School, Hyderabad in the year 1995, and then did his graduation in English literature from Hindu College, New Delhi in the year 1998. Moving to Mumbai, he did a course in Film & Television Production from Xavier Institute of Communications before taking a headlong plunge in the world of Hindi films.

== Career ==
He began his career as an associate director and co-writer to Vishal Bhardwaj for his debut Makdee (2002). He went on to assist him in his subsequent films, and most notably co-wrote Vishal's trendsetting Omkara (2006) and Kaminey (2009).

Abhishek's directorial debut, the dark comedy Ishqiya (2010) and its sequel Dedh Ishqiya (2014), both starring Naseeruddin Shah received rave reviews.

His following film, Udta Punjab (2016), highlighted the drug crisis in Punjab and was released to critical acclaim.

He made his debut as a producer with Konkona Sen Sharma's A Death in the Gunj (2016), which premiered at MAMI Mumbai Film Festival. Currently, he is working on his next project.

His next directorial venture Sonchiriya (2019) presented a rooted tale set in Chambal and released to positive reviews from critics. It won Critics Award for Best Film at the 65th Filmfare Awards.

== Filmography ==
Year	Film	Director	Writer	Producer	Notes
2002	Makdee				Assistant director
2003	Maqbool				Assistant director
2005	The Blue Umbrella		Yes		Assistant director
2006	Omkara		Yes		Assistant director
2007	Blood Brothers		Yes		
2009	Kaminey		Yes		co-wrote screenplay with Sabrina Dhawan, Supratik Sen
2010	Ishqiya	Yes			
2013	Matru Ki Bijlee Ka Mandola		Yes		
2014	Dedh Ishqiya	Yes			
2016	Udta Punjab	Yes			
2016	A Death in the Gunj			Yes	
2019	Sonchiriya	Yes	Yes		
2020	Raat Akeli Hai			Yes	
2021	Ray	Yes			Segment - "Hungama Hai Kyon Barpa"
2024	Killer Soup	Yes	Yes		Netflix series
2024	Ullozhukku			Yes	Malayalam film
2025	Raat Akeli Hai: The Bansal Murders			Yes	
2026	Satluj			Yes	

== Awards and nominations ==
Year	Award	Category	Film	Result	Ref.
2007	8th IIFA Awards	Best Screenplay (with Vishal Bharadwaj)	Omkara	Nominated	
2011	12th IIFA Awards	Best Story	Ishqiya	Nominated	
2011	12th IIFA Awards	Best Screenplay (with Vishal Bhardwaj and Sabrina Dhawan)	Ishqiya	Nominated	
2011	Producers Guild Film Awards	Best Story	Ishqiya	Nominated	
2011	Producers Guild Film Awards	Best Screenplay (with Vishal Bhardwaj and Sabrina Dhawan)	Ishqiya	Nominated	
2011	Screen Awards	Most Promising Debut Director	Ishqiya	Nominated	
2011	Stardust Awards	Best Director – Thriller or Action	Ishqiya	Nominated	
2011	Stardust Awards	Hottest New Director	Ishqiya	Nominated	
2011	Zee Cine Awards 2011	Most Promising Debut Director	Ishqiya	Nominated	
2017	62nd Filmfare Awards	Best Director	Udta Punjab	Nominated	
2017	18th IIFA Awards	Best Director	Udta Punjab	Nominated	
2017	Stardust Awards	Best Story (with Sudip Sharma)	Udta Punjab	Nominated	
2017	Stardust Awards	Best Screenplay (with Sudip Sharma)	Udta Punjab	Won	
2017	Zee Cine Awards	Best Director	Udta Punjab	Nominated	
2017	Zee Cine Awards	Best Story (with Sudip Sharma)	Udta Punjab	Nominated	
2020	65th Filmfare Awards	Best Film (Critics)	Sonchiriya	Won	
2020	65th Filmfare Awards	Best Story (with Sudip Sharma)	Sonchiriya	Nominated	
