= Pari (2018 Indian film) =

2018 film by Prosit Roy

- Theatrical release poster
- Directed by: Prosit Roy
- Written by: Abhishek Banerjee; Prosit Roy
- Screenplay by: Prosit Roy
- Story by: Prosit Roy
- Produced by: Anushka Sharma; Karnesh Ssharma; Prerna Arora
- Starring: Anushka Sharma; Parambrata Chatterjee; Rajat Kapoor; Ritabhari Chakraborty; Mansi Multani
- Cinematography: Jishnu Bhattacharjee
- Edited by: Manas Mittal
- Music by: Songs; Anupam Roy; Background Music; Ketan Sodha
- Production companies: Clean Slate Filmz; KriArj Entertainment; Kyta Productions
- Distributed by: Pooja Entertainment; Zee Studios International
- Release date: March 2, 2018 (India)
- Running time: 134 minutes
- Country: India
- Language: Hindi
- Budget: ₹30 crore
- Box office: ₹41.4 crore

Pari (transl. Fairy) is a 2018 Indian Hindi language supernatural horror film directed by Prosit Roy in his debut. It stars Anushka Sharma and marks her third production venture for her company Clean Slate Filmz. Parambrata Chatterjee, Ritabhari Chakraborty, Rajat Kapoor and Mansi Multani feature in supporting roles. Production on the film began in June 2017, and it was released theatrically on 2 March 2018.

== Plot ==
The story revolves around the demon Ifrit and Auladhchakra, a satanic cult in Bangladesh that seeks to perpetuate the bloodline of Ifrit. The cult abducts women and summons a male demon to have intercourse with them, so that they may be impregnated with the demon’s offspring. Professor Qasim Ali once led a group of vigilantes who tracked down women impregnated by Ifrit, held them captive until they gave birth, and then immediately killed the demonic infants by decapitating them and sealing their heads in glass jars. This drew opposition from the villagers; despite some initial support, the group was ultimately disbanded due to its violently radical methods. Rukhsana is the daughter of one such woman, a victim of the ritual who escaped captivity before Professor Ali could kill her child.

Arnab is a young man who owns and operates a printing press. Piyali, a nurse, is due to enter into an arranged marriage with him. While returning home in heavy rain, Arnab and his parents accidentally run over an elderly woman. After the woman dies, the police search her home—an old hut in the forest—and discover a dishevelled Rukhsana chained inside. Feeling sympathetic and responsible upon realising she has no one, Arnab takes her in. Rukhsana knows nothing of the modern world and is frequently troubled by demonic visions. Arnab finds her strange but endearing, and as they spend time together, she falls in love with him. Meanwhile, a mortuary assistant discovers that Rukhsana’s mother bears the cult’s mark on her skin and informs Professor Ali, who has been searching for Rukhsana for years.

One night, Rukhsana falls ill. Although Arnab mistakes this for her period, in reality her body must expel the poison it produces each month due to her demonic blood. She secretly kills a dog by biting it and releasing the poison. Later, she confesses her love to Arnab, and the two have sex. The following morning, Professor Ali confronts Arnab with the truth about Rukhsana, but Arnab refuses to believe him. The mortuary assistant fights Arnab and injures him. In retaliation, Rukhsana kills the assistant and then positions herself between Arnab and Piyali, overcome with jealousy. When Arnab argues with her, she seizes him by the throat and lifts him off the ground.

Disturbed, Arnab realises that Professor Ali was telling the truth and begins researching Ifrit. He learns that Ifrit offspring are born after one month rather than nine. Arnab contacts Professor Ali, who arrives with his men. At that moment, Rukhsana reveals to Arnab that she is pregnant with his child. The professor’s men restrain and torture her so that she dies from her own poison. Although she cries out for Arnab, he leaves in despair. Three weeks later, Piyali visits Arnab at his parents’ home, and he tells her the truth about Rukhsana. Through this conversation, he realises he should not have abandoned her, as it was he who impregnated her, and the child is his.

After enduring repeated beatings, Rukhsana breaks free and kills the professor before making her way to Piyali’s home. She injures Piyali but then goes into labour. Unable to kill her, both because she is a nurse and due to her own past experience with an abortion, Piyali instead helps Rukhsana deliver the baby, which is born with an umbilical cord. Rukhsana leaves the child with Piyali and disappears. Arnab rushes to the old hut, where he finds Rukhsana close to death. He embraces her as she struggles against the urge to bite him and release her poison, choosing instead to keep it within her body. Before dying, she tells Arnab that their baby is human. In the end, Arnab concludes that Rukhsana’s love made their child human, rather than Ifrit’s hatred, and he resolves to raise the child himself.

== Cast ==
- Anushka Sharma as Rukhsana
- Parambrata Chatterjee as Arnab
- Rajat Kapoor as Professor Qasim Ali
- Ritabhari Chakraborty as Piyali
- Mansi Multani as Kalapori
- Mithu Chakrabarty as Arnab's mother
- Rohit Kadu Deshmukh as Arnab's friend
- Santilal Mukherjee as Police Inspector
- Dibyendu Bhattacharya as Morgue worker
- Arijit Dutta
- Sraboni Biswas
- Aasif Khan as Ismail (cameo).

== Marketing ==
The first look of Pari was released on 13 June 2017 by Sharma via her Twitter handle. The film's motion poster, promotionally called Screamer, was released on 9 January 2018, showing the face of Sharma's character getting bruised. A 30-second clip, the second "screamer", was released on 3 February 2018, which showed Sharma watching a cartoon on television with an idyllic smile, giving the impression that she is safe and okay. However, the camera pans to show that her hands and feet are bruised, and she is chained to the bed. The official teaser of Pari was released on 7 February 2018 by Sharma via her Twitter handle. The third screamer, released on Valentine's Day, opens with Anushka and Parambrata's characters watching television when Anushka says "I love you" to him. She becomes disturbed when she hears an eerie female voice respond, "I love you too." The camera pans to show a bloody and battered version of herself, grinning and terrifying the real Anushka. The official trailer of Pari was released one day later, on 15 February 2018. After the trailer, two other screamers have been released.

== Controversies ==
During the shooting of the film in August 2017 at Basanti State Highway, 24 Pgs. (S) district of West Bengal, a technician was electrocuted. The shooting of the film was immediately stopped but was started again after a while.

The film has been banned in Pakistan for allegedly promoting black magic, some non-Islamic values and anti-Muslim sentiments.

== Music ==
Pari

Soundtrack album by Anupam Roy
- Released: 5 March 2018
- Genre: Feature film soundtrack
- Length: 9:58
- Label: Zee Music Company
External audio
- Audio Jukebox on YouTube

The music of Pari was composed by Anupam Roy while the lyrics were written by Anvita Dutt.

Tracklist
No.	Title	Singer(s)	Length
1.	"Meri Khamoshi Hai"	Ishan Mitra	5:18
2.	"So Ja So Ja"	Rekha Bhardwaj	4:40
Total length:			9:58

== Reception ==
=== Critical response ===
On the review aggregator website Rotten Tomatoes, 53% of 15 critics' reviews are positive, with an average rating of 4.7/10.

Positive reviews gave definite praise for Anushka's performance and praised the makers for making a movie in this genre. While Renuka Vyavahare of TOI called it "Anushka's strongest work as an actor-producer so far", she also went on to add that, "Pari has the ability to redefine the genre as it's refreshingly different, atmospheric and moody". Rajeev Masand of News18 gave the film a rating of 2 out of 5 saying that, "Pari, co-produced by and starring Anushka Sharma, is a competently made film that's rich in atmospherics", but he went onto conclude that "Pari doesn't come together in a coherent, satisfying way. What starts out interestingly, ends in a mess." Rohit Bhatnagar of Deccan Chronicle stated: "Pari is a delightful treat to those who are fond of horror flicks. And stop complaining that Bollywood doesn't produce good horror films!" Koimoi reviewed Pari as "one of the best to come out of this genre". As a last word, they added: "Hollywood, please take out the notepad and write down the stuff from Pari on how to make a non-clichéd horror film. Surely one of the best in this genre & a must-watch for the fans. Producer Anushka Sharma needs a special mention to make this possible" and rated the film 3.5 out of 5. Gulf news gave the movie 3 stars out of 5 and wrote that "Anushka Sharma's horror film is a world apart from other ghoulish Bollywood offerings, and that's a good thing".

Rohit Vats of Hindustan Times gave the film a rating of 1 out of 5 and said that, "Anushka Sharma's film Pari is a confusing tale of ghosts, ghouls, djinns and forced legitimacy. Pari appears puzzled, as if they don't know how to end what they started. With 136 minutes of screen time, Pari doesn't head anywhere." Lakshana N Palat of India Today gave the film a rating of 2 out of 5 saying that, "The story of Pari is submerged under irrelevant scenes, jump scares, and the desperate need to fall into the horror-film category. It's a shame, because the storyline was actually quite a unique and interesting one." Shubhra Gupta of The Indian Express gave the film a rating of 1 out of 5 and concluded her review by saying that, "Anushka Sharma plays Rukhsana with a great deal of bloody enthusiasm. You cannot accuse her of not trying hard, but the film is so poorly-written, and so scatter-brained that nothing can rescue it." Saibal Chatterjee of NDTV said about the film that, "It lacks the narrative consistency that its in-your-face methods needed in order to be truly effective. In the end, the makers of Pari try way too hard. The outcome is an extended blur that leaves you dazed but totally unimpressed." and gave the film a rating of 2 out of 5.

=== Accolades ===
Award	Category	Nominees	Result, Ref.
Zee Cine Awards	Best Actress (Jury's Choice)	Anushka Sharma	Nominated
Zee Cine Awards	Best Debut Director (Jury's Choice)	Prosit Roy	Nominated
Screen Awards	Best Actress (Critics)	Anushka Sharma	Nominated
Screen Awards	Best Film (Critics)		Nominated
Screen Awards	Best Promising Debut Director (Critics)	Prosit Roy	Nominated
Filmfare Awards	Best VFX	Red Chillies VFX	Nominated
Filmfare Awards	Best Sound Design	Anish John	Nominated
Critics' Choice Movie Awards	Best Actress	Anushka Sharma	Nominated

== See also ==
- List of Hindi horror films
