= Navdeep Singh (director) =

Indian film director and writer (born 1966)

- Born: 11 October 1966 (age 58); New Delhi National Capital Region, India
- Occupation(s): Director, writer, advertisement maker
- Years active: 1999–present

Navdeep Singh (born 1966) is an Indian film director and writer. He is best known for his Bollywood film, NH10.

== Early life ==
He was born in Delhi to an Army officer and travelled across India when he was young. He graduated in Delhi and started an animation studio with a friend, one of the first in India. He studied film-making at the Art Center College of Design in Pasadena, graduating in 1997. He lived in the US for eight years and two years in London before moving back to India in 2000.

== Career ==
After graduating Singh directed commercials and music videos for UGround and Cognito in LA, and Great Guns in London. He then moved to Mumbai in 2001 and has directed a number of award-winning commercials.

=== Bollywood ===
His debut in Bollywood with feature film Manorama Six Feet Under, a murder mystery, was critically acclaimed. It is regarded as one of the best noir films.

After a gap of seven years, his 2015 thriller film NH10, with Anushka Sharma's home production and in the lead, was commercially successful. The film is about honour killing and patriarchy.

His next release was the period action film Laal Kaptaan starring Saif Ali Khan as a bounty hunter on a revenge spree. The film was released in 2019.

Navdeep also worked as a development consultant on the first season of the hit web series Paatal Lok.

He is working on his next film, Kaneda, as Canada is sometimes called in Punjabi. The film is about the rise and fall of a Punjabi gangster in Vancouver. The film stars Diljit Dosanjh, Arjun Kapoor, Anushka Sharma, and Pooja Hegde. It's produced by Vikramaditya Motwane and Vijay Saini.

His latest release, Shehar Lakhot, has him as creator, showrunner and director with Amazon Prime Video, India.

== Personal life ==
He married Madhavi Singh in 1989. He has two children. His daughter Nayantara Singh was born in 1993 and his son Rudraveer Singh was born in 1999.

== Filmography ==
Year	Film	Language	Notes
2007	Manorama Six Feet Under	Hindi	
2015	NH10	Hindi	
2019	Laal Kaptaan	Hindi	
2023	Shehar Lakhot	Hindi	An Amazon Original series.
