= Bollywood Hungama OTT India Fest =

Annual Indian media awards

Bollywood Hungama OTT India Fest and Awards
- Bollywood Hungama OTT Awards 2023
- Awarded for: Excellence in cinematic achievements
- Country: India
- Presented by: Bollywood Hungama
- First award: 18 October 2023
- Winner: Full list

The Bollywood Hungama OTT India Fest and Awards are yearly honors that recognize artistic and technical excellence in Hindi-language original programming within the over-the-top (OTT) space. The inaugural awards ceremony took place on 18 October 2023, at Taj Lands End, Mumbai. It included films and series released between 2022 and 2023. The OTT India Fest was organized by the digital entertainment company Bollywood Hungama in collaboration with Cinema Waale Film and Television Productions LLP and Across Media Solutions and was presented by Sonata Poze.

== History ==
The first edition of the Bollywood Hungama OTT India Fest occurred on 18 and 19 October 2023, at Taj Lands End, Mumbai. Curated, directed, and scripted by Cinema Waale Film and TV Productions and produced by Across Media Solutions, the event featured a diverse lineup of panel discussions, fireside chats, master classes, and workshops, as well as an awards ceremony to honour the artists from the OTT entertainment industry.

The first day commenced with a panel discussion on India's OTT landscape, featuring industry experts and decision-makers. On the second day, the festival concluded with a panel featuring The Archies team. The film's cast—Suhana Khan, Khushi Kapoor, Agastya Nanda, Mihir Ahuja, Vedang Raina, Yuvraj Menda, and Aditi Dot—joined Reema Kagti and Zoya Akhtar in launching the song 'Suno' from the Netflix original.

== Winners and nominees ==
Original Films
Best Feature Film (OTT Originals)	Best Director
Darlings; Gulmohur; Monica, O My Darling; Qala; Sirf Ek Bandaa Kaafi Hai	Jasmeet K Reen – Darlings; Anvita Dutt – Qala; Apoorv Singh Karki – Sirf Ek Banda Kaafi Hai; Rahul V Chiitela – Gulmohar; Vasan Bala – Monica, O My Darling
Best Actor (Male)	Best Actor Male (Popular)
Manoj Bajpayee – Sirf Ek Banda Kaafi Hai and Gulmohar; Rajkummar Rao – Monica, O My Darling; Varun Dhawan – Bawaal; Vicky Kaushal – Govinda Naam Mera; Vijay Varma – Darlings	Varun Dhawan – Bawaal; Kartik Aaryan – Freddy; Sidharth Malhotra – Mission Majnu; Vicky Kaushal – Govinda Naam Mera; Vijay Varma – Darlings
Best Actor (Female)	Best Actor Female (Popular)
Sanya Malhotra – Kathal; Alia Bhatt – Darlings and Heart of Stone; Janhvi Kapoor – Bawaal; Kiara Advani – Govinda Naam Mera; Triptii Dimri – Qala	Janhvi Kapoor – Bawaal; Alia Bhatt – Darlings and Heart of Stone; Kiara Advani – Govinda Naam Mera and Satyaprem Ki Katha; Madhuri Dixit – Maja Ma; Sara Ali Khan – For Gaslight
Best Supporting Actor
Sikandar Kher – Monica, O My Darling; Roshan Mathew – Darlings; Sharmila Tagore – Gulmohar; Shefali Shah – Darlings; Suraj Sharma – Gulmohar
Web Originals
Best Series	Best Director
Jubilee; Farzi; Kohrra; Scoop; The Night Manager Season 1 and 2	Raj and DK – Farzi / Guns & Gulaabs; Abhay Pannu – Rocket Boys Season 2; Hansal Mehta – Scoop; Homi Adajania – Saas Bahu Aur Flamingo; Vikramaditya Motwane – Jubilee
Best Actor (Male)	Best Actor Male (Popular)
Pankaj Tripathi – Criminal Justice: Adhura Sach; Aditya Roy Kapur – The Night Manager Season 1 and 2; Arshad Warsi – Asur S2; Sidhant Gupta – Jubilee; Suvinder Vicky – Kohrra	Rajkummar Rao – Guns and Gulaabs; Aditya Roy Kapur – The Night Manager Season 1 and 2; Arshad Warsi – Asur S2; Pankaj Tripathi – Criminal Justice: Adhura Sach; Shahid Kapoor – Farzi
Best Actor (Female)	Best Actor Female (Popular)
Sushmita Sen — Taali; Aditi Rao Hydari – Jubilee; Dimple Kapadia – Saas Bahu Aur Flamingo; Sobhita Dhulipala – Made in Heaven S2 and The Night Manager S1 & S2; Tilottama Shome and Amruta Subhash – Lust Stories 2	Sonakshi Sinha – Dahaad; Aditi Rao Hydari — Jubilee; Karishma Tanna – Scoop; Shefali Shah – Delhi Crimes S2; Tamannaah Bhatia – Aakhri Sach
People's Choice
Best Actor of The Year - Male (Series)	Best Actor of The Year - Female (Series)
Anil Kapoor – The Night Manager; Abhishek Bachchan – Breathe: Into the Shadows Season 2; Aditya Roy Kapur – The Night Manager Season 1 and 2; Manoj Bajpayee – Sirf Ek Bandaa Kaafi Hai; Shahid Kapoor – Farzi	Tamannaah Bhatia – Jee Karda and Aakhri Sach; Kajol – Lust Stories S2 and The Trial; Kalki Koechlin – Made In Heaven S2; Sushmita Sen – Taali; Tilottama Shome and Amruta Subhash – Lust Stories 2
Best Director of The Year - Series	Best Original Film of The Year
Hansal Mehta – Scoop; Abhay Pannu – Rocket Boys S2; Homi Adajania – Saas Bahu Aur Flamingo; Raj & DK – Farzi / Guns and Gulaabs; Vikramaditya Motwane – Jubilee	Bawaal; Darlings; Govinda Naam Mera; Mission Majnu; Qala
Best Original Series of The Year
Kohrra; Saas Bahu Aur Flamingo; Jubilee; Scoop; The Night Manager Season 1 and 2
Technical Awards
Best Story & Screenplay (Film)
Anvita Dutt – Qala
Best Story & Screenplay (Series)	Best Music (Series and Feature Film)
Abhay Pannu – Rocket Boys S2	Amit Trivedi – Qala and Jubilee
Best Adapted / Non-Original OTT Work	Best Ensemble Cast (Series)
Scoop	Made In Heaven S2
Mould-Breaking Actor Of The Year
Tilottama Shome and Amruta Subhash – The Mirror in Lust Stories 2; Huma Qureshi — Tarla; Janhvi Kapoor – Bawaal; Sanya Malhotra – Kathal; Shefali Shah – Delhi Crime 2 and Darlings
Best Breakthrough Performer - Series
Aparshakti Khurana – Jubilee; Radhika Madan – Saas, Bahu Aur Flamingo; Barun Sobti — Kohrra; Bhuvan Arora – Farzi; Gulshan Devaiah – Guns and Gulaabs; Wamiqa Gabbi – Jubilee
Best Non-Fiction Series - Originals
Fabulous Lives of Bollywood Wives S2; Cinema Marte Dum Tak; Moving In With Malaika; The Hunt for Veerappan; The Romantics
Charismatic Performer Of The Year
Triptii Dimri – Qala; Aditi Rao Hydari — Jubilee; Kajol – Lust Stories S2 and The Trial; Sobhita Dhulipala – Made in Heaven S2 / The Night Manager S1 & 2; Sushmita Sen – Taali
Game Changing Actor Of The Year
Sobhita Dhulipala – Made in Heaven S2 / The Night Manager S1 & S2; Madhuri Dixit — Maja Ma; Sushmita Sen – Taali; Triptii Dimri – Qala; Wamiqa Gabbi – Jubilee
Iconic Creator Of The Year
Karan Johar – Rocky Aur Rani Kii Prem Kahaani, Fabulous Lives of Bollywood Wives S2, Govinda Naam Mera
Most Powerful OTT Debut Of The Year
Sidhant Gupta – Jubilee
Bankable Star Of The Year
Vijay Varma – Darlings, Kaalkoot, Dahaad, Lust Stories 2
Inspirational Icon Of India Showbiz
Jaideep Ahlawat – Action Hero
Power Packed Performer Of The Year
Jim Sarbh
Glam Showbiz Diva Of The Year
Malaika Arora – India's Best Dancer and Moving in With Malaika
Iconic Performer Of The Year
Aditi Rao Hydari – Jubilee
Sensational Artist Of The Year
Chitrandgda Singh – Gaslight
Magnificent Artist Of The Year
Nawazuddin Siddiqui – Haddi, Afwaah, Jogira Sara Ra Ra, Tiku Weds Sheru
Musical Sensation Of Indian Showbiz
Amaal Mallik
Most Promising OTT Debut Of The Year
Maniesh Paul
Most Dazzling Performer (Films / OTT)
Kritika Kamra
Most-Loved Couple Of The Year
Ali Fazal & Richa Chadha
Most Vivacious Musical Duo
Sukriti Kakar-Prakriti Kakar – Jhoome Jo Pathaan, Kar Gayi Chull, Dil Ka Darji, and Hawaa Hawaa
Comic Whizz Of The Year
Sumukhi Suresh
Trailblazing Artist Of The Year
Varun Sharma

== See also ==
- Bollywood Hungama Style Icons
