= 2023 Filmfare OTT Awards =

Edition of Indian media award ceremony

- Awarded for: Excellence in OTT content
- Date: 26 November 2023
- Country: India
- Presented by: Filmfare
- Hosted by: Sharib Hashmi; Kubbra Sait
- First award: 19 December 2020

Highlights
- Most awards: Jubilee (9)
- Most nominations: Jubilee (17)
- Best Drama Series: Scoop
- Best Comedy Series: TVF Pitchers (Season 2)
- Best Film: Web Originals: Sirf Ek Bandaa Kaafi Hai
- Best Non-Fiction Original (Series): Cinema Marte Dum Tak
- Best Series Critics: Trial by Fire
- Website: 2023 Filmfare OTT Awards

2023 Filmfare OTT Awards, the fourth edition of awards presented to honour artistic and technical excellence in original programming on over-the-top streaming media in Hindi-language. Web original shows or films released across OTT platforms between 1 August 2022 and 31 July 2023 were eligible for Awards. Nominations were announced by Filmfare on 22 November 2023.

Jubilee led the ceremony with 17 nominations, followed by Gulmohar with 14 nominations, Rocket Boys (Season 2) with 13 nominations, and Darlings with 11 nominations.

Jubilee won 9 awards, including Best Director in a Drama Series (for Vikramaditya Motwane), thus becoming the most-awarded series at the ceremony.

== Winners and nominees ==
Sources: nominations

Sources: winners

- Winners denoted in **boldface**

=== Popular awards ===
Drama Series
Best Series	Best Director
**Scoop** – Netflix; Asur (Season 2) – JioCinema; Dahaad – Amazon Prime Video; Farzi – Amazon Prime Video; Jubilee – Amazon Prime Video; Kohrra – Netflix; Rocket Boys (Season 2) – SonyLIV; School of Lies – Disney+ Hotstar; The Night Manager – Disney+ Hotstar; Trial by Fire – Netflix	**Vikramaditya Motwane** – **Jubilee**; Abhay Pannu – Rocket Boys (Season 2); Avinash Arun – School of Lies; Hansal Mehta – Scoop; Prashant Nair – Trial by Fire; Raj & DK – Farzi; Randeep Jha – Kohrra; Reema Kagti and Ruchika Oberoi – Dahaad; Tanuj Chopra – Delhi Crime (Season 2)
Best Actor (Male)	Best Actor (Female)
**Suvinder Vicky** – **Kohrra**; Aamir Bashir – School of Lies; Abhay Deol – Trial by Fire; Aditya Roy Kapur – The Night Manager; Anil Kapoor – The Night Manager; Aparshakti Khurana – Jubilee; Jim Sarbh – Rocket Boys (Season 2); Pankaj Tripathi – Criminal Justice: Adhura Sach; Shahid Kapoor – Farzi; Sidhant Gupta – Jubilee; Vijay Varma – Dahaad	**Rajshri Deshpande** – **Trial by Fire**; Dimple Kapadia – Saas, Bahu Aur Flamingo; Kajol – The Trial; Karishma Tanna – Scoop; Shefali Shah – Delhi Crime (Season 2); Sonakshi Sinha – Dahaad; Wamiqa Gabbi – Jubilee
Best Supporting Actor (Male)	Best Supporting Actor (Female)
**Barun Sobti** – **Kohrra**; Bhuvan Arora – Farzi; Gulshan Devaiah – Dahaad; Harman Baweja – Scoop; Mohammed Zeeshan Ayyub – Scoop; Prathamesh Parab – Taaza Khabar; Prosenjit Chatterjee – Jubilee; Saswata Chatterjee – The Night Manager	**Tillotama Shome – Delhi Crime (Season 2)**; Harleen Sethi – Kohrra; Nimrat Kaur – School of Lies; Radhika Madan – Saas, Bahu Aur Flamingo; Rasika Duggal – Delhi Crime (Season 2); Shweta Tripathi – Kaalkoot; Tillotama Shome – The Night Manager
Comedy Series
Best Series / Special
**TVF Pitchers (Season 2)** – ZEE5; Crushed – Amazon Mini TV; Farzi Mushaira – Amazon Prime Video; Half Pants Full Pants – Amazon Prime Video; Happy Family: Conditions Apply – Amazon Prime Video; Hostel Daze (Season 3) – Amazon Prime Video; TVF Tripling (Season 3) – ZEE5
Best Actor (Male)	Best Actor (Female)
**Abhishek Banerjee** – **The Great Weddings of Munnes**; Amol Parashar – TVF Tripling (Season 3); Atul Kulkarni – Happy Family: Conditions Apply; Bhuvan Bam – Rafta Rafta; Johnny Lever – Pop Kaun?; Kunal Khemu – Pop Kaun?	**Maanvi Gagroo** – **TVF Tripling (Season 3)**; Aadhya Anand – Crushed; Juhi Parmar – Yeh Meri Family (Season 2); Ratna Pathak Shah – Happy Family: Conditions Apply; Srishti Ganguli – Rafta Rafta
Best Supporting Actor (Male)	Best Supporting Actor (Female)
**Arunabh Kumar** – **TVF Pitchers (Season 2)**; Kumud Mishra – TVF Tripling (Season 3); Kunaal Roy Kapur – TVF Tripling (Season 3); Naman Jain – Crushed; Purav Jha – Ishq Next Door	**Shernaz Patel** – **TVF Tripling (Season 3)**; Ahsaas Channa – Hostel Daze (Season 3); Shilpa Shukla – Taaza Khabar; Sunita Rajwar – The Great Weddings of Munnes; Swati Das – Happy Family: Conditions Apply
Web Originals
Best Film	Best Director
**Sirf Ek Bandaa Kaafi Hai** – ZEE5; Babli Bouncer – Disney+ Hotstar; Darlings – Netflix; Gulmohar – Disney+ Hotstar; Kathal – Netflix; Lost – ZEE5; Lust Stories 2 – Netflix; Monica, O My Darling – Netflix; Qala – Netflix	**Apoorv Singh Karki – Sirf Ek Bandaa Kaafi Hai**; Aniruddha Roy Chowdhury – Lost; Jasmeet K. Reen – Darlings; Konkona Sen Sharma – Lust Stories 2; Rahul V. Chittella – Gulmohar; Vasan Bala – Monica, O My Darling
Best Actor (Male)	Best Actor (Female)
**Manoj Bajpayee** – **Sirf Ek Bandaa Kaafi Hai**; Diljit Dosanjh – Jogi; Manoj Bajpayee – Gulmohar; Rajkummar Rao – Monica, O My Darling; Shahid Kapoor – Bloody Daddy; Varun Dhawan – Bawaal; Vijay Varma – Darlings	**Alia Bhatt** – **Darlings**; Huma Qureshi – Monica, O My Darling; Janhvi Kapoor – Bawaal; Sanya Malhotra – Kathal; Sharmila Tagore – Gulmohar; Tamannaah Bhatia – Babli Bouncer; Tripti Dimri – Qala; Yami Gautam – Lost
Best Supporting Actor (Male)	Best Supporting Actor (Female)
**Suraj Sharma** – **Gulmohar**; Ayush Mehra – Kacchey Limbu; Gajraj Rao – Maja Ma; Pankaj Kapur – Lost; Rajat Barmecha – Kacchey Limbu; Sharib Hashmi – Tarla	**Amruta Subhash** – **Lust Stories 2**; **Shefali Shah** – **Darlings**; Radhika Apte – Monica, O My Darling; Shriya Pilgaonkar – Ishq-e-Nadaan; Simran – Gulmohar; Swastika Mukherjee – Qala
Best Non – Fiction Original (Series)
**Cinema Marte Dum Tak** – Amazon Prime Video; Dancing on the Grave – Amazon Prime Video; Fabulous Lives of Bollywood Wives; Mumbai Mafia: Police vs Underworld – Netflix; Playground (Season 2) – Amazon miniTV; The Romantics – Netflix
Writing Awards
Best Original Story (Series)	Best Original Dialogue (Series)
**Gunjit Chopra and Diggi Sisodia – Kohrra**; Atul Sabharwal and Soumik Sen – Jubilee; Avinash Arun & Ishani Banerjee – School of Lies; Homi Adajania – Saas, Bahu Aur Flamingo; Raj & DK – Farzi; Reema Kagti, Ritesh Shah and Zoya Akhtar – Dahaad; Subhash Kapoor & Singh Nandan – Maharani (Season 2)	**Karan Vyas – Scoop**; Abhay Pannu, Kausar Munir – Rocket Boys (Season 2); Arunabh Kumar, Prashant Kumar, Shubham Sharma, Talha Siddiqui, Garima Kunzru – TVF Pitchers (Season 2); Atul Sabharwal – Jubilee; Gaurav Shukla, Abhijeet Khuman, Suraj Gianani – Asur (Season 2); Sumit Arora – Dahaad; Uma Shankar Singh Maharani (Season 2)
Best Original Screenplay (Series)	Best Adapted Screenplay (Series)
**Gunjit Chopra, Sudip Sharma and Diggi Sisodia – Kohrra**; Abhay Pannu – Rocket Boys (Season 2); Arunabh Kumar, Prashant Kumar, Shubham Sharma, Talha Siddiqui – TVF Pitchers (Season 2); Atul Sabharwal – Jubilee; Bijesh Jayarajan, Iti Agarwal, Anurag Pandey – Criminal Justice: Adhura Sach; Ishani Banerjee & Nishant Agrawal – School of Lies; Raj & DK, Sita Menon, Suman Kumar – Farzi; Reema Kagti, Ritesh Shah, Sunayana Kumari, Mansi Jain, Chaitanya Chopra, Karan Shah – Dahaad	**Mrunmayee Lagoo, Mirat Trivedi and Anu Singh Choudhary – Scoop**; Abbas Dalal, Hussain Dalal, Siddharth Kumar – The Trial; Arshad Syed, Vaibhav Modi, Karan Oberoi – Mukhbir - The Story of a Spy; Ishan Trivedi, Sudhir Mishra – Tanaav; Karan Shrikant Sharma – Kafas; Kersi Khambatta – Class; Shridhar Raghavan – The Night Manager
Best Original Screenplay (Web Original Film)	Best Dialogue (Web Original Film)
**Jasmeet K. Reen, Parveej Sheikh – Darlings**; **Rahul V. Chittella, Arpita Mukherjee – Gulmohar**; Ajitpal Singh – Fire in the Mountains; Amit Joshi, Aradhana Sah, Madhur Bhandarkar – Babli Bouncer; Nikhil Mehrotra, Shreyas Jain, Piyush Gupta, Nitesh Tiwari – Bawaal; Pooja Tolani, Konkona Sen Sharma – Lust Stories 2; Shiv Singh, Akshat Trivedi, Aleya Sen – Trial Period	**Deepak Kingrani – Sirf Ek Bandaa Kaafi Hai**; Aleya Sen, Akshat Trivedi – Trial Period; Ali Abbas Zafar, Aditya Basu – Bloody Daddy; Rahul V. Chittella, Arpita Mukherjee – Gulmohar; Sudeep Nigam – Ishq-e-Nadaan; Vijay Maurya, Jasmeet K Reen, Parveez Sheikh – Darlings
Best Story (Web Original Film)
**Deepak Kingrani – Sirf Ek Bandaa Kaafi Hai**; Amit Joshi, Aradhana Sah, Madhur Bhandarkar, Shakeel Shafi Mohammed – Babli Bouncer; Ashwiny Iyer Tiwari – Bawaal; Jasmeet K. Reen, Parveej Sheikh – Darlings; Pooja Tolani, Konkona Sen Sharma – Lust Stories 2; Rahul V. Chittella, Arpita Mukherjee – Gulmohar; Yogesh Chandekar – Monica, O My Darling
Music Awards
Best Background Music (Series)	Best Original Soundtrack (Series)
**Alokananda Dasgupta – Jubilee**; Achint Thakkar – Rocket Boys (Season 2); Dharam Bhatt – Asur (Season 2); Gaurav Chatterji, Ashish Zachariah – School of Lies; Ketan Sodha – Farzi; Sachin Sanghvi, Jigar Saraiya – Jee Karda; Tubby – Class	**Amit Trivedi – Jubilee**; Achint Thakkar – Rocket Boys (Season 2); Aditya N., Nayantara Bhatkal, Chakori Dwivedi, Keshav Dhar, Akhilesh Jain – Class; Anurag Saikia, Vivek Hariharan, Jonita Gandhi, Neha Karode – Mismatched (Season 2); Sachin Sanghvi, Jigar Saraiya, Rashmeet Kaur, I.P. Singh, Simran Choudhary, Mellow D., Luv – Jee Karda; Sachin Sanghvi, Jigar Saraiya, Tanishk Bagchi, Raghav Meattle, Priya Saraiya – Farzi; Santhosh Narayanan – Faadu – A Love Story
Best Background Music (Web Original Film)
**Achint Thakkar – Monica, O My Darling**; Daniel B. George – Bawaal; Julius Packiam – Bloody Daddy; Prashant Pillai – Darlings; Sagar Desai – Qala; Sandeep Chowta – Sirf Ek Bandaa Kaafi Hai; Siddhartha Khosla – Gulmohar
Technical Awards
Best Production Design (Series)	Best Cinematographer (Series)
**Aparna Sud and Mukund Gupta – Jubilee**; Abhimanyu Jai – TVF Pitchers (Season 2); Meghna Gandhi – Rocket Boys (Season 2); Parichit Paralkar – Farzi; Shailaja Sharma – Dahaad; Somanwita Bhattacharya – ImMature (Season 2); Tanvi Leena Patil – Scoop	**Pratik Shah – Jubilee**; Avinash Arun – School of Lies; Harshvir Oberai – Rocket Boys (Season 2); Linesh Desai – Saas, Bahu Aur Flamingo; Pratham Mehta – Scoop; Saurabh Monga – Kohrra
Best Costume Design (Series)	Best VFX (Series)
**Shruti Kapoor – Jubilee**; Lovedeep Gulyani – Class; Maxima Basu – Saas, Bahu Aur Flamingo; Nikhat Neerusha – Taj: Divided by Blood; Pallavi Patel, Anubha Patnaik – TVF Pitchers (Season 2); Shivangi Shrivastav – Sixer (Season 1); Uma Biju, Biju Antony – Rocket Boys (Season 2)	**Arpan Gaglani (Philmcgi) – Jubilee**; Deepak Bhatia, Prashant Thakur – Trial by Fire; Vishwas Savanur – Rocket Boys (Season 2)
Best Editing (Series)	Best Sound Design (Series)
**Aarti Bajaj – Jubilee**; Amitesh Mukherjee – Scoop; Antara Lahiri, Parikshhit Jha, Manas Mittal – Delhi Crime (Season 2); Maahir Zaveri – Rocket Boys (Season 2); Sanyukta Kaza – Kohrra; Sumeet Kotian – Farzi; Xavier Box, Dániel Hajnal – Trial by Fire	**Kunal Sharma, Dhruv Parekh – Jubilee**; Arka Ghosh – Inspector Avinash; Bigyna Dahal – Class; Sanjay Maurya, Allwin Rego – Delhi Crime (Season 2); Subash Sahoo – Rocket Boys (Season 2); Sudeepta Sadhukhan, Ateesh Chattopadhyay, Ankita Purkayastha – Sixer (Season 1)
Best Production Design (Web Original Film)	Best Cinematographer (Web Original Film)
**Meenal Agarwal – Qala**; Aditya Kanwar – Bawaal; Mansi Dhruv Mehta – Gulmohar; Paul Rowan – Blind; Rajnish Hedao, Snigdha Basu, Sumit Basu – Bloody Daddy	**Swapnil S. Sonawane – Monica, O My Darling**; Eeshit Narain – Gulmohar; Manoj Kumar Khatoi – Trial Period; Marcin Laskawiec – Bloody Daddy; Mitesh Mirchandani – Bawaal; Siddharth Diwan – Qala
Best Editing (Web Original Film)	Best Sound Design (Web Original Film)
**Nitin Baid – Darlings**; Charu Shree Roy – Bawaal; Steven H. Bernard – Bloody Daddy; Sumeet Kotian – Sirf Ek Bandaa Kaafi Hai; Tanupriya Sharma – Gulmohar	**Anirban Sengupta – Darlings**; Dileep Subramaniam – Bloody Daddy; Kunal Sharma – Monica, O My Darling; P. M. Satheesh, Manoj M. Goswami – Gulmohar; Sanjay Maurya, Allwin Rego – Bawaal

=== Critics' Choice Awards ===
Best Series	Best Director (Series)
**Trial by Fire** **– Netflix**	**Randeep Jha** – **Kohrra**
Best Actor (Male): Drama Series	Best Actor (Female): Drama Series
**Vijay Varma – Dahaad as Anand Swarnakar**	**Karishma Tanna – Scoop as Jagruti Pathak**; **Sonakshi Sinha – Dahaad as Sub-inspector Anjali Bhaati**
Best Web Original Film
**Lust Stories 2 – Konkona Sen Sharma**; **Monica, O My Darling – Vasan Bala**
Best Actor (Male): Film	Best Actor (Female): Film
**Rajkummar Rao – Monica, O My Darling as Jayant "Jay" Arkhedkar a.k.a. Johnny**	**Sanya Malhotra – Kathal as Inspector Mahima Basor**; **Sharmila Tagore – Gulmohar as Kusum Batra**

== Superlatives ==
=== Nominations and wins by program ===
Nominations by program
Nominations	Program	Streaming Media
17	Jubilee	Amazon Prime Video
14	Gulmohar	Disney+ Hotstar
13	Rocket Boys (Season 2)	SonyLIV
11	Darlings	Netflix
10	Farzi	Amazon Prime Video
10	Scoop	Netflix
9	Bawaal	Amazon Prime Video
9	Dahaad	Amazon Prime Video
9	Kohrra	Netflix
9	Monica, O My Darling	Netflix
8	School of Lies	Disney+ Hotstar
7	Bloody Daddy	JioCinema
7	Sirf Ek Bandaa Kaafi Hai	ZEE5
6	Delhi Crime (Season 2)	Netflix
6	Qala	Netflix
6	The Night Manager	Disney+ Hotstar
6	Trial by Fire	Netflix
6	TVF Pitchers (Season 2)	ZEE5
6	TVF Tripling (Season 3)	ZEE5
5	Class	Netflix
5	Lust Stories 2	Netflix
5	Saas, Bahu Aur Flamingo	Disney+ Hotstar
4	Babli Bouncer	Disney+ Hotstar
4	Happy Family: Conditions Apply	Amazon Prime Video
4	Lost	ZEE5
3	Crushed	Amazon Mini TV
3	Trial Period	JioCinema
2	Criminal Justice: Adhura Sach	Disney+ Hotstar
2	Hostel Daze (Season 3)	Netflix
2	Ishq-e-Nadaan	JioCinema
2	Jee Karda	Amazon Prime Video
2	Kacchey Limbu	JioCinema
2	Kathal	Netflix
2	Maharani (Season 2)	SonyLIV
2	Pop Kaun?	Disney+ Hotstar
2	Rafta Rafta	Amazon Mini TV
2	Sixer (Season 1)	ZEE5
2	Taaza Khabar	Disney+ Hotstar
2	The Great Weddings of Munnes	JioCinema

Wins by program
Wins	Program	Streaming Media
9	Jubilee	Amazon Prime Video
5	Darlings	Netflix
5	Kohrra	Netflix
5	Sirf Ek Bandaa Kaafi Hai	ZEE5
4	Monica, O My Darling	Netflix
4	Scoop	Netflix
3	Gulmohar	Disney+ Hotstar
2	Dahaad	Amazon Prime Video
2	Lust Stories 2	Netflix
2	Trial by Fire	Netflix
2	TVF Pitchers (Season 2)	ZEE5
2	TVF Tripling (Season 3)	ZEE5

=== Nominations and wins by streaming media ===
Nominations by streaming media
Nominations	Streaming Media
74	Netflix
59	Amazon Prime Video
45	Disney+ Hotstar
27	ZEE5
23	JioCinema
18	SonyLIV
7	Amazon Mini TV

Wins by Streaming Media
Wins	Streaming Media
25	Netflix
12	Amazon Prime Video
10	ZEE5
3	Disney+ Hotstar

== See also ==
- Filmfare Awards
- 68th Filmfare Awards
- 2022 Filmfare OTT Awards
