= Shalewa Ashafa =

Nollywood actress

- Born: July 12, 1995 (age 31); Ogun State
- Other name: ShallyStar
- Education: University of Lagos
- Occupation: Actress
- Notable work: The Razz Guy

Shalewa Ashafa (born 12 July 1995) popularly known as ShallyStar is a Nollywood actress who is known for her roles in Ajoche and The Razz Guy.

== Early life and education ==
Shalewa Ashafa was born as the last child of her parents in Ogun State on 12 July 1995. She obtained her primary school Certificate from Christ the Cornerstone Nursery and Primary School, GRA Ikeja, Lagos, and completed her Secondary school at Iloko Model College in Osun state. She obtained her first degree in advertising from the University of Lagos.

== Acting career ==
She began her acting career at a young age, participating in drama clubs at both her church and school. Throughout her career, she has appeared in several films, including The Razz Guy (2021) and Blood Covenant (2022).

== Filmography ==
Year	Title	Role
2017	Evol	Tundun
2021	The Razz Guy	Eve
2022	There is Something Wrong with the Bamideles	Osas Bamidele
2022	The Blood Covenant	Ronke
2022	The One for Sarah	Vera
2022	Hell Ride	
