= Lost (2023 film) =

2023 film by Aniruddha Roy Chowdhury

- Official release poster
- Directed by: Aniruddha Roy Chowdhury
- Written by: Shyamal Sengupta; Ritesh Shah
- Produced by: Sam Fernandes
- Starring: Yami Gautam; Pankaj Kapur; Rahul Khanna; Neil Bhoopalam; Pia Bajpiee; Tushar Pandey
- Cinematography: Avik Mukhopadhyay
- Edited by: Bodhaditya Banerjee
- Music by: Shantanu Moitra
- Production companies: Zee Studios; Namah Pictures; Miracle Pictures
- Distributed by: ZEE5
- Release date: 16 February 2023
- Running time: 124 minutes
- Country: India
- Language: Hindi

Lost is a 2023 Indian Hindi-language thriller film directed by Aniruddha Roy Chowdhury and produced by Zee Studios along with Namah Pictures. The film stars Yami Gautam, Pankaj Kapur, Rahul Khanna, Neil Bhoopalam, Pia Bajpiee. The film had its world premiere at the Chicago South Asian Film Festival on 22 September 2022. It had its Asian premiere at the 53rd International Film Festival of India, Goa. The film was released on 16 February 2023, on ZEE5.

"Lost" received a standing ovation at the Chicago South Asian Film Festival, where it premiered. Subsequently, it was selected as the closing film of Atlanta Indian Film Festival.

At the 2023 Filmfare OTT Awards, Lost received 4 nominations – Best Web Original Film, Best Director in a Web Original Film (Roy Chowdhury), Best Actress in a Web Original Film (Gautam) and Best Supporting Actor in a Web Original Film (Kapur).

== Plot ==
Inspired by true events, "Lost" charts the story of a young woman crime reporter who is working on a story of sudden disappearance of a young theatre activist. The layered story aims to represent the idea of lost values and integrity.

== Cast ==
- Yami Gautam as Vidhi Sahani
- Pankaj Kapur as Nanu
- Rahul Khanna as Ranjan Varman
- Rukkmini Ghosh as Aditi Varman
- Neil Bhoopalam as Jeet
- Pia Bajpiee as Ankita Chauhan
- Tushar Pandey as Ishan Bharti
- Akshay Kapoor as Aman Yadav
- Honeyy Jain as Namita
- Vinay Sharma as Sanjeev Sahani

== Production ==
The shooting of the film started soon in July 2021 in Kolkata. The filming wrapped by end of August 2021.

== Reception ==
Firstpost in its review states, "The real hero of Lost is the city of Kolkata. It has never looked more vibrant and mysterious in any Hindi films since Sujoy Ghosh’s Kahaani." Rating it 3 out of 5, India Today commented, "Lost might not be your easy breezy watch for the weekend, but it sure would make you think.' Times Now called Lost an "ode to 'lost' art of investigative journalism." Shubhra Gupta of The Indian Express gave 2 out of 5 ratings.

== Music ==
Lost

Soundtrack album by Shantanu Moitra
- Released: 7 February 2023
- Genre: Feature film soundtrack
- Length: 28:43
- Language: Hindi
- Label: Zee Music Company

Shantanu Moitra chronology
Sherdil: The Pilibhit Saga (2022)	Lost (2023)	12th Fail (2023)

Official audio
- Lost - Full Album on YouTube

The music for the film was composed by Shantanu Moitra and lyrics were written by Swanand Kirkire.

No.	Title	Singer(S)	Length
1.	"Mon Re - Title Track"	KK	4:56
2.	"Roshni"	Papon	4:39
3.	"Zara Hatke"	Madhubanti Bagchi	3:28
4.	"Nouka Doobi" (Male Version)	Swanand Kirkire	5:07
5.	"Nouka Doobi" (Female Version)	Shreya Ghoshal	4:59
6.	"Mere Maula"	Raja Hassan	5:27
Total length:			28:43

== Accolades ==
Year	Award ceremony	Category	Nominee / work	Result	Ref.
2023	Filmfare OTT Awards	Best Web Original Film	Lost	Nominated	
2023	Filmfare OTT Awards	Best Director in a Web Original Film	Aniruddha Roy Chowdhury	Nominated	
2023	Filmfare OTT Awards	Best Actress in a Web Original Film	Yami Gautam	Nominated	
2023	Filmfare OTT Awards	Best Supporting Actor in a Web Original Film	Pankaj Kapur	Nominated	
