= School of Lies =

- Genre: Drama; Mystery; Thriller
- Created by: Avinash Arun; Ishani Banerjee
- Written by: Ishani Banerjee; Nishant Agarwala; Shoaib Nazeer
- Directed by: Avinash Arun
- Starring: Aamir Bashir; Geetika Vidya Ohlyan; Nimrat Kaur; Shakti Anand; Vir Pachisia
- Country of origin: India
- Original language: Hindi
- No. of seasons: 1
- No. of episodes: 8

Production
- Executive producer: Deepali Handa
- Producer: Sameer Gogate
- Cinematography: Avinash Arun
- Editor: Monisha R Baldawa
- Running time: 30- 40 minutes
- Production company: BBC Studios

Original release
- Network: Disney+ Hotstar
- Release: 2 June 2023

School of Lies is an Indian Hindi-language drama mystery thriller television series created by Avinash Arun and Ishani Banerjee and directed by Avinash Arun. It stars Nimrat Kaur, Aamir Bashir, Varin Roopani, Divyansh Dwivedi, Aryan Singh Ahlawat, Vir Pachisia, Sonali Kulkarni, Hemant Kher, Parthiv Shetty, Adrija Sinha, Aalekh Kapoor and others.

At the 2023 Filmfare OTT Awards, School of Lies received 8 nominations, including Best Drama Series, Best Director in a Drama Series (Arun), Best Actor in a Drama Series (Bashir) and Best Supporting Actress in a Drama Series (Kaur).

== Cast ==
- Nimrat Kaur as school counsellor Nandita Mehra
- Aamir Bashir as schoolmaster Samuel "Sam" Singh
- Aryan Singh Ahlawat as TK
- Varin Roopani as Vikram Singh
- Vir Pachisia as Shakti Salgaonkar
- Shakti Anand as Dev, Nandita's boyfriend
- Sonali Kulkarni as Pallavi, Vikram's mother
- Geetika Vidya Ohlyan as Trisha, Shakti's mother
- Adrija sinha as Pritika, Vikram's girl friend
- Nitin Goel as Bhola
- Vijay Kumar Dogra as S.I. Prakash
- Jitendra Joshi as Aniruddh, Shakti's father
- Divyansh Dwivedi as Chanchal
- Hemant Choudhary as TK’s Uncle
- Shajith Moosa as Vikram's Lawyer

== Premise ==
A 12-year-old student, Shakti Salgaonkar, goes missing from a prestigious boarding school.

== Filming ==
The series was shot in The Lawrence School, Lovedale in Ooty in Tamil Nadu.

== Release ==
The series premiered on 2 June 2023 on Disney+ Hotstar.

== Reception ==
Shubhra Gupta of The Indian Express wrote "Amongst the strands not as impactful as they should have been is the depiction of the cruel discipline-bondage bit between some masters and students; another is an attempt to portray the pain that comes from infidelity."

Saibal Chatterjee of NDTV rated the series 4 stars out of 5 and wrote "The repercussions of unhappy (or confused) states of mind, the contradictions between studied external posturing and raging inner turmoil, and friendships tested and scalding betrayals are effectively plaited into the larger portrait of lacerated lives."

Outlook India stated "Mindbender of a show, just watch ‘Dark’ on Netflix and give ‘School Of Lies’ a pass."

Santanu Das for Hindustan Times wrote "There's a rootlessness with which the overlong and repetitive School of Lies operates- the school might as well be located somewhere near the railway station to employ the sound of tracks. It would make no difference. The angle of the local child who accompanies Shakti- which we follow in a parallel track with the story in present time, is shockingly left incomplete."

A critic from India Today rated 3 stars out of 5 and wrote "One of the few loopholes about the show has to be how different storylines are stitched and not every explanation quenches your curiosity. You’d want to know more about a character but before you have an answer, the show would have already followed another path, another course."

The Week wrote "Viewers might even feel let down at certain points where they would not have been able to segregate a flashback from the present state. However, this tactic effectively maintains the mystery throughout."

A critic from The Telegraph stated "The smart twist in the penultimate episode — that forces the audience to go back and re-examine everything that has transpired so far — indicates controlled, sharp writing."

Firstpost wrote "The narrative is promisingly tense but the performances are unfortunately all auto-pilot. Emote less to thrill more seems to be the funda of makers to create palpable, atmospheric tension. Also, the gloominess of the fictional town the series is based in begins to feel dull and soulless after a point. The set-up took me to Sujoy Ghosh’s Kahaani 2, where a curious woman wanted to dig deep into the trauma a child was suffering from."

A critic of The Times of India wrote "The breathtaking beauty of the lush green surroundings becomes a character in its own right, enhancing the mysterious nature of the show's storyline. While the plot may offer mild unpredictability, it effectively keeps viewers invested in the overarching story of a scandal that engulfs the school."

Scroll.in wrote "The show emphasises the danger of unresolved issues, childhood trauma and proclivity for repeated behavioural patterns, but opts for visual impact and specific surprise, padding the narrative with surplus characters and side plots."

Zoom TV wrote "Although the pace could have been a little more crisp, the show does manage to draw you in. However, the adult-like conversations between school children appear to be unconvincing."

WION praised the performance of the actors and wrote "The performance of the young boys is commendable - whether it is Vir Pachisia, Varun Roopani, or Aryan Singh Ahlawat. They have all given excellent performances and are the gems of the show. Bashir, Nimrat, Nitin Goel, and Sonali Kulkarni, have also delivered decent performances."

== Accolades ==
Year	Award ceremony	Category	Nominee / work	Result	Ref.
2023	Filmfare OTT Awards	Best Drama Series	School of Lies	Nominated	
2023	Filmfare OTT Awards	Best Director in a Drama Series	Avinash Arun	Nominated	
2023	Filmfare OTT Awards	Best Actor in a Drama Series	Aamir Bashir	Nominated	
2023	Filmfare OTT Awards	Best Supporting Actress in a Drama Series	Nimrat Kaur	Nominated	
2023	Filmfare OTT Awards	Best Original Story (Series)	Avinash Arun & Ishani Banerjee	Nominated	
2023	Filmfare OTT Awards	Best Original Screenplay (Series)	Ishani Banerjee & Nishant Agrawal	Nominated	
2023	Filmfare OTT Awards	Best Background Music (Series)	Gaurav Chatterji, Ashish Zachariah	Nominated	
2023	Filmfare OTT Awards	Best Cinematographer (Series)	Avinash Arun	Nominated	
