= The Razz Guy =

2021 Nigerian film

- Directed by: Udoka Oyeka
- Written by: Egbemawei Dimiyei Sammy; Africa Ukoh
- Produced by: Uche Okocha
- Starring: Lasisi Elenu; Nancy Isime
- Cinematography: Kaghor Crowther Idhebor
- Edited by: Iseoluwadoyin Emmanuel
- Music by: Michael ‘Truth” Ogunlade
- Production company: Trino Motion Pictures
- Distributed by: Filmone Entertainment
- Release date: 19 March 2021
- Running time: 99 minutes
- Country: Nigeria
- Language: English

The Razz Guy is a 2021 Nigerian comedy-drama film directed by Udoka Oyeka, written by Egbemawei Sammy, and produced by Trino Motion Pictures.

It was released in cinemas on 19 March 2021.

== Plot ==
The film follows a rude and condescending senior executive who is assigned to oversee an international business merger. His arrogance and highhandedness earn him a curse from an office cleaner, causing him to lose his ability to speak proper English ahead of the crucial deal. He must either find a way to lift the curse and secure the merger or resign himself to his fate.

== Cast ==
- Lasisi Elenu as Temi Johnson
- Nancy Isime as Nadine
- Omotunde Adebowale David (Lolo) as Bimpe
- Frank Donga as cleaner
- Iretiola Doyle as Nadine’s aunt
- Imoh Eboh as Aisha
- Bucci Franklin as Agbero
- Ronya Man as American client
- Tina Mba as Nadine's mother
- Andy Femi Moyan as lawyer
- Eric Obinna as Mr. Ikenna
- Broda Shaggi as Dare
- Yemi Solade as Mr. Adeyemi
- Ibrahim Suleiman as Dr. Jones
- MC Lively as pastor
- Norbert Young as Nadine's father
- Shalewa Ashafa

== Release ==
The film was shot in 2019, and the official trailer was released on 17 November 2020. The Razz Guy premiered on 14 March 2021 and was released in cinemas on 19 March 2021.

== Awards and nominations ==
Year	Award	Category	Recipient	Result	Ref
2023	Africa Magic Viewers' Choice Awards	Best Actor in a Comedy Drama, Movie or TV Series	Nosa Afolabi	Nominated	
2023	Africa Magic Viewers' Choice Awards	Best Supporting Actor	Bucci Franklin	Nominated	

== See also ==
- List of Nigerian films of 2021
