= Lasisi Elenu =

Nigerian comedian and actor

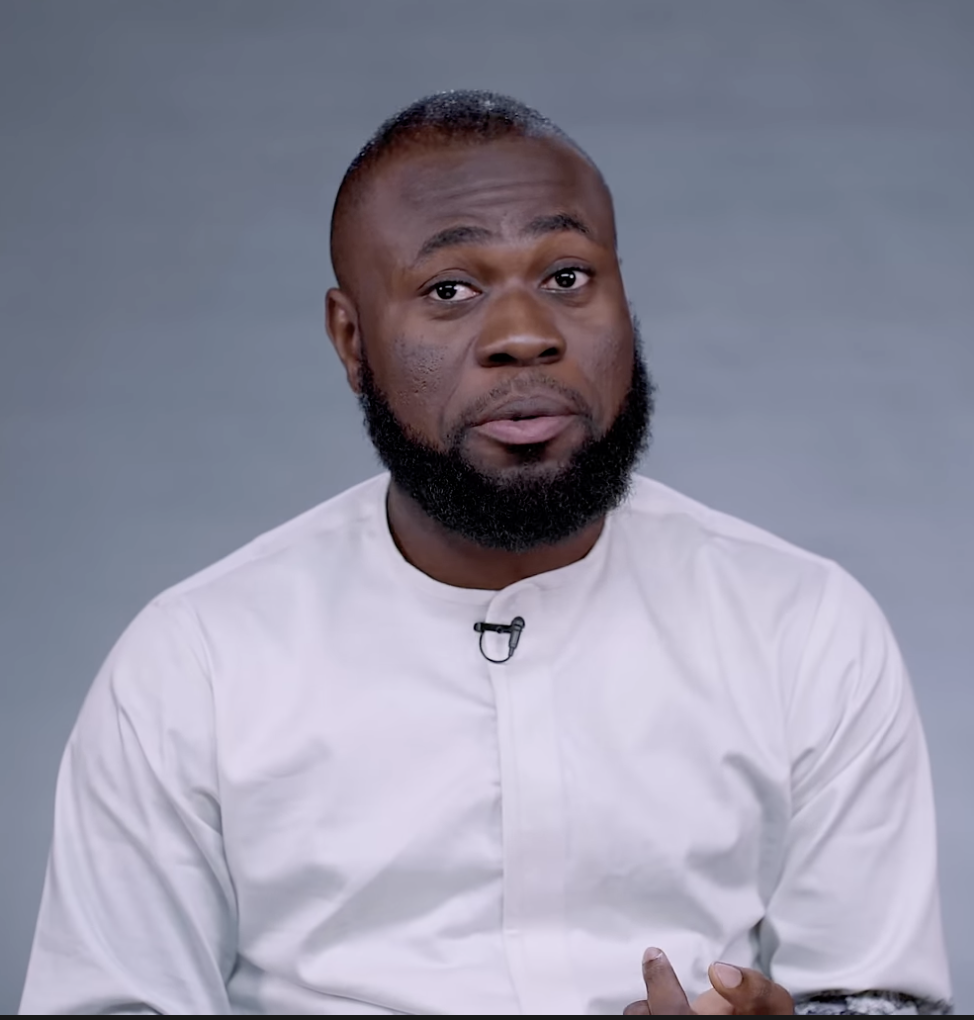
- Born: Nosa Afolabi; Kano, Nigeria
- Citizenship: Nigerian
- Education: University of Ilorin (B.S.)
- Occupations: Comedian and actor

Nosa Afolabi, better known as Lasisi Elenu, is a Nigerian comedian, actor, and master of ceremonies from Offa, Kwara in Nigeria. He is known in platforms such as ; The Audition, a comedy show on YouTube, he also does an act with a 'wide mouth' disguise filter during performances and on social media. Elenu was recently featured in Netflix thriller, The Ghost and the Tout.

In 2018, he was nominated for The Future Awards Africa Prize for Comedy. In March 2020, he was named one of Nigeria's Top 25 Under-30 Nigerian Superstars. He is an entertainer who is into diverse areas of the entertainment industry, as well as one of the winners of the second edition of the Trendupp Awards.

== Career ==
The comedian is one of the continent's most popular social media influencers with 75,000 followers on TikTok and over 3.4 million followers on Instagram.

His skits focus on varying themes from law to cybercrime, the economy, insecurity and philosophy. He started out as a musician before diverting to the business of comedy. He performed at the Mama Tobi Homecoming concert.

His project Mama & Papa Gods power is a series of 16-minute episodes focusing on a fictional low-income household in Nigeria.

== Personal life ==
In 2022, Lasisi Elenu married Nonso Adika, now Nonso Afolabi and the couple welcomed a daughter in October of the same year.

== Filmography ==
- The Ghost and the Tout (2018) as Hoodlum
- Made in Heaven (2019) as Azazel
- Makate Must Sell (2019) as Radio Caller 1 (voice)
- The Razz Guy (2021) as Temi Johnson
- African Messiah (2021)
- Sabinus the Best Man (2023) as Peter
- Small Talk (2023) as Okoh
- Shaping Us (2024)

== Awards and nominations ==
Year	Award	Category	Film	Result	Ref
2023	Africa Magic Viewers' Choice Awards	Best Actor in a Comedy Drama, Movie Or TV Series	The Razz Guy	Nominated	

== Controversy ==
Controversy struck in July 2020 when Elenu was warned by members of the Nigerian Bar Association, who threatened to sue him, claiming his jokes were misrepresenting the legal profession.
