= Happy Family: Conditions Apply =

2023 Indian family comedy series by Jamnadas Majethia

- Release poster
- Genre: Comedy
- Directed by: Aatish Kapadia
- Starring: Ratna Pathak Shah; Raj Babbar; Atul Kulkarni; Ayesha Jhulka
- Music by: Hiral Viradia
- Country of origin: India
- Original language: Hindi
- No. of seasons: 1
- No. of episodes: 10

Production
- Producers: Jamnadas Majethia; Aatish Kapadia
- Camera setup: Multi-camera
- Production company: Hatsoff Production

Original release
- Network: Amazon Prime Video
- Release: 10 March 2023 – present

Happy Family: Conditions Apply is a 2023 Indian Hindi language comedy family-based television series for Amazon Prime Video. The series is directed and produced by Jamnadas Majethia and Aatish Kapadia. It stars Ratna Pathak Shah, Raj Babbar, Atul Kulkarni and Ayesha Jhulka.

At the 2023 Filmfare OTT Awards, Happy Family: Conditions Apply received 4 nominations – Best Comedy Series, Best Actress in a Comedy Series (Pathak Shah), Best Actor in a Comedy Series (Kulkarni) and Best Supporting Actress in a Comedy Series (Das).

== Plot ==
The series follows four generations of the Dholakia family and depicts differences between traditional and modern values within the family. The family members encounter various situations arising from their differing personalities and individual characteristics.

=== Main plot ===
Sanjuoy Dholakia is planning to move out with his wife Tisca and their son Aryan. He is anxious to break the news to his father Ramesh, worried how he would react. When Sanjouy is forced to reveal the truth in a game of Truth and Dare, Ramesh is overcome with sadness, and keeps trying to convince Sanjuoy not to move out. As Tisca tells Sanjouy's mother Pallavi that moving out was not her decision, Sanjuoy's grandmother, Hemlata accuses Tisca of wanting to remain in the family just to take advantage of Pallavi as a babysitter for Aryan. As Pallavi feels upset, Hemlata's husband Mansukhlal resolves the conflict, assuring Pallavi that Tisca values her.

Suresh, Hemlata and Mansuhklal's elder son, lives in the US. One day, he calls the family and reveals that he has married Kwamboka, a Kenyan-African woman, much to Hemlata's dismay. However, everybody else is excited to meet her.

Hemlata's gold jewellery, given to her by her mother-in-law, goes missing. Meanwhile, Napoleon, a famous designer, showcases a design that quite resembles one of Tisca's designs. Thus, Hemlata accuses Napoleon of stealing Tisca's design in a post on social media. Hemlata's jewellery thief is found to be their delivery man and her jewellery is recovered, only for her to find out that her mother-in-law had given her fake jewellery. On Tisca's insistence, the Dholakias choose not to press charges, since the thief has a promising future ahead of him.

Tisca freaks out when she sees Hemlata's post, confessing that she was the one who stole Napoleon's design, not the other way round. Tisca apologizes to Napoleon, but he admits that Tisca's version of his design was better than his original design. He thus offers her a job in Delhi. Sanjuoy and Hemlata are against this but the other family members support Tisca. Sanjuoy eventually comes around and admits that he felt jealous. He then supports Tisca in her temporary move to Delhi.

When Suresh and Kwamboka visit the Dholakias, Hemlata is surprised by Kwamboka's sweet nature and her values. Hemlata warmly welcomes her into the family and adores her to the extent that she ends up completely neglecting her elder daughter-in-law Pallavi. Pallavi feels insecure of Kwamboka, but when Hemlata and Kwamboka get into a fight, Pallavi supports and comforts Kwamboka, thus developing a good relationship with her.

Tisca tells Sanjuoy that she would soon be back to Mumbai, as Napoleon is shifting the company headquarters there. But instead of being happy, Sanjuoy gets worried and behaves secretively, leading Mansukhlal to suspect that something is wrong. Meanwhile, Sanjuoy's sister Ayushi tells Pallavi that she is in a casual Friends With Benefits relationship with her friend Timmy. Ayushi's encounter with a prospective groom goes horribly, as he turns out to be extremely sexist.

Tisca finds out that she is pregnant. She and Ayushi decide to surprise Sanjuoy but Ayushi catches him cheating on Tisca with Jacky, the ex-husband of his business partner Diana. Sanjuoy declares that it is not just an affair but that he loves Jacky, and convinces Ayushi to keep this a secret. Mansukhlal, who was suspecting Sanjuoy of having an affair with Diana, finds out the truth. He tells Sanjuoy to choose between Tisca and Jacky.

Pallavi has a sudden heart attack and she is rushed to the hospital. Dr Jatin, husband of Hemlata and Mansukhlal's daughter Falguni, assures the Dholakias that Pallavi will be fine but tells them that Pallavi must rest and reduce her responsibilities. The family steps in to fill Pallavi's responsibilities while she recovers, while Tisca finds out that she is having twins. Sanjuoy and Tisca tell Ramesh that they have chosen not to move out. But surprisingly, Ramesh tells them that Pallavi's heart attack taught him not to neglect himself and his own life, and that he would support Sanjuoy and Tisca whenever they wish to move out.

Sanjuoy asks Jacky to plan the party for Hemlata and Mansukhlal's anniversary. The Dholakias gather at a mall to celebrate, but the mall is hijacked by terrorists. The terrorists publicly make certain demands and threaten to kill the hostages one by one if their demands are not met within ten minutes. Everyone, certain that they are about to die, decide to play one last game of Spin the Bottle to reveal their secrets and unburden themselves before dying. Pallavi reveals that despite claiming to be a pure vegetarian, she secretly eats fish and sneaks it into Hemlata's food too; Mansukhlal and Hemlata reveal that Suresh was adopted and not their biological son; Jatin reveals that he has another wife with whom he also has a child; Falguni, in response, reveals that she had transferred all of Jatin's assets to her name; Ayushi tells Ramesh that she has been sleeping with Timmy; Sanjuoy reveals his affair with Jacky and tells Tisca that he loves him.

As their ten minutes run out, they brace themselves for death but find out that the police have arrived and that they are saved. With everyone's secrets now out in the open, everyone fights amongst themselves. The show concludes with Aryan wondering what will happen next.

== Episodes ==
| No. overall | No. in season | Title | Directed by | Original release date |
|---|---|---|---|---|
| 1 | 1 | "Truth, Dare, And Dhamaal" | Jamnadas Majethia | March 10, 2023 |
In the episode, the introduction has been done. Hemlata Dholakia and her husband Mansukhlal Dholakia lives with their son, Ramesh Dholakia who lives with his wife, Pallavi Dhokalia (Pallu) along with their daughter Ayushi Dholakia and son Sanjuoy Dholakia and his wife Tisca Dholakia and their son. On one day, they visit a park for a vacation, where Ayushi decides to play a game of 'Truth and Dare' where the water bottle has been moved towards Sanjuoy and forced him to say the truth, where he reveals the decision of buying a new flat which was done one year ago to the family. But, after hearing the decision, Ramesh gets shock and asked why Sanjuoy wants to buy a new flat, but he didn't answered. However, Ramesh tried hard to convince Sanjuoy not to buy flat. But he was not being convinced. Meanwhile, Hemlata continues to blame Tisca for the decision of buying new flat. But she denied. After some days, Hemlata's another son Suresh who lives in US gave another shock to Hemlata, saying that he married a Kenyan-American girl last week while in Las Vegas. She got disappointed and ashamed that instead of marrying a Gujarati girl, he married a foreigner.
| 2 | 2 | "Who Stole My Happiness?" | Jamnadas Majethia | March 10, 2023 |
| 3 | 3 | "Catch Me If You Can" | Jamnadas Majethia | March 10, 2023 |
| 4 | 4 | "Papa Do Preach, Don't Sing" | Jamnadas Majethia | March 10, 2023 |
| 5 | 5 | "To Go or Not To Go" | Jamnadas Majethia | March 17, 2023 |
| 6 | 6 | "Number 1 Bahu" | Jamnadas Majethia | March 17, 2023 |
| 7 | 7 | "A Reception, And A Deception" | Jamnadas Majethia | March 24, 2023 |
| 8 | 8 | "Trading Places" | Jamnadas Majethia | March 24, 2023 |
| 9 | 9 | "Happy Family, Conditions Apply" | Jamnadas Majethia | March 31, 2023 |
| 10 | 10 | "The Last Supper" | Jamnadas Majethia | March 31, 2023 |

== Cast ==
- Ratna Pathak Shah as Hemlata Mansukhlal Dholakia (Hemu/Hemudi)
- Raj Babbar as Mansukhlal Dholakia (Pappaji)
- Atul Kulkarni as Ramesh Dholakia
- Ayesha Jhulka as Pallavi Dholakia (Pallu)
- Raunaq Kamdar as Sanjuoy Dholakia (Sanjay/Sanju)
- Meenal Sahu as Tisca Singh Dholakia
- Sanah Kapur as Ayushi Dholakia
- Atul Kumar as Suresh Dholakia
- Paresh Ganatra as Dr. Jatin Kumar
- Pranoti Pradhan as Dr. Falguni Kumar "Falu" (nee Dholakia)
- Karamjeet Madonna as News Reader
- Margaret Wanjiku Kariuki as Kwamboka Dholakia
- Vinayak Ketkar as Manager of the Hotel
- Deepak Pareek as Dr. Popat
- Pratish Vora as Inspector Mendoncca
- Swati Das as Kanakavalli
- Neha Jhulka as Diana Cabinetmaker
- Waqar Khan as Gregory
- Mahabanoo Mody-Kotwal as Sheela Maasi
- Jatin Suri as Superstar Shalom Khan

== Soundtrack ==
The tracks of this series were released on 13 March 2023 by Sony Music and Amazon Prime Video.

Happy Family: Conditions Apply

Soundtrack album by Hiral Viradia, Vishal Mishra
- Released: 13 March 2023
- Recorded: 2023
- Genre: Feature film soundtrack
- Length: 5:55
- Language: Hindi
- Label: Sony Music

| No. | Title | Lyrics | Music | Singer(s) | Length |
|---|---|---|---|---|---|
| 1. | "Happy Family – Title Track" | Hiral Viradia | Sony Music | Hiral Viradia; Vishal Mishra; Pooja Tiwari; Sarthak Kalyani | 2:24 |
| 2. | "Gujarati Naar" | Hiral Viradia | Sony Music | Hiral Viradia; Pooja Tiwari | 3:31 |
| Total length: | | | | | 5:55 |

== Reception ==
During the first screening of the series just before the release of it on 9 March 2023, several actors including Pankaj Kapur, Supriya Pathak, Aanjjan Srivastav, Sarita Joshi, Hussain Kuwajerwala and others were present in the screening in Mumbai, who have praised the series as a leading family comedy series that everyone should watch. Archika Khurrana of Times of India gave it 4 stars out of 5 praising the direction, comedy and performance of the ensemble cast. she stated that this series did not a single dull moment. Nirmal Gayatri of Pinkvilla also gave 4 stars out of 5 praises the Ratna Pathak Shah and in her final conclusion she said "Happy Family: Conditions Apply" is the ideal remedy for your yearning spirit if you want to binge on a weekend show during the workweek. News18 gave the series 3.5 out of 5, and said it includes much comedy like Sarabhai vs Sarabhai and Khichdi, which were directed by Jamnadas Majethia and Aatish Kapadia. Happy Family puts an upper-middle-class Gujarati family's lives in focus, all while being relative. Tushar Joshi of India Today rated the series 3.5/5 and wrote "The biggest USP of the show is the writing and the direction. Keeping the scenes as real and relatable as possible, you get drawn into the lives of these characters. Their fights, worries, wins and defeats suddenly seem to be all yours."

== Accolades ==
| Year | Award ceremony | Category | Nominee / work | Result | Ref. |
|---|---|---|---|---|---|
| 2023 | Filmfare OTT Awards | Best Comedy Series | Happy Family: Conditions Apply | Nominated | |
| 2023 | Filmfare OTT Awards | Best Actress in a Comedy Series | Ratna Pathak Shah | Nominated | |
| 2023 | Filmfare OTT Awards | Best Actor in a Comedy Series | Atul Kulkarni | Nominated | |
| 2023 | Filmfare OTT Awards | Best Supporting Actress in a Comedy Series | Swati Das | Nominated | |
