= Crushed (TV series) =

Indian romantic drama television series

- Promotional release poster - Season 1
- Genre: Drama; Romance
- Written by: Avinash Singh; Vijay Verma; Nishaad Javeri; Tatsat Pandey; Abhinav Vaidya; Sankalp Raj Tripathi
- Directed by: Heena Dsouza; Mandar Kurundkar
- Starring: Rudhraksh Jaiswal; Aadhya Anand; Anupriya Caroli; Arjun Deswal; Naman Jain; Urvi Singh; Chirag Katrecha
- Theme music composer: Hrishikesh Patil; Karthik Rao
- Country of origin: India
- Original language: Hinglish
- No. of seasons: 4
- No. of episodes: 24

Production
- Producers: Aditi Shrivastava; Anirudh Pandita; Ashwin Suresh
- Cinematography: Ershad Shaikh; Abhijeet Chaudhari
- Editors: Ganesh Sapkal; Jaicy V. Mathew
- Camera setup: Multi-camera
- Running time: 22 minutes
- Production companies: Dice Media; Pocket Aces Pictures

Original release
- Network: Amazon miniTV
- Release: 12 January 2022 – 9 February 2024

Crushed is an Indian Hindi-language romantic drama television series produced under the banner of Dice Media and Pocket Aces Pictures. The series features Rudhraksh Jaiswal, Aadhya Anand, Anupriya Caroli, Arjun Deswal, Naman Jain, Urvi Singh and Chirag Katrecha. It premiered on Amazon miniTV on 12 January 2022. The final and fourth season released on 9 February 2024.

At the 2023 Filmfare OTT Awards, Crushed received 3 nominations – Best Comedy Series, Best Actress in a Comedy Series (Aadhya Anand), Best Supporting Actor in a Comedy Series (Naman Jain).

== Plot ==
Samvidhan Sharma a.k.a. Sam (Rudraksh Jaiswal) and Aadhya Mathur (Aadhya Anand), two sidekicks, have always lived in the shadows of their popular best friends Prateek (Naman jain) and Jasmine aka Jazz (Urvi Singh) gone completely unnoticed in Lucknow Central Convent school. Until the two of them finally take notice of each other, albeit under awkward and unusual circumstances, and a surprisingly easy friendship begins. For the first time in their lives, they feel like they belong. But will falling in love be as easy, and for how long can two sidekicks remain heroes of their own love story, before insecurities, changing dynamics and growing pains get the better of them?

== Cast ==
=== Main ===
- Rudhraksh Jaiswal as Samvidhan "Sam" Sharma
- Aadhya Anand as Aadhya Mathur
- Arjun Deswal as Sahil Thakur
- Naman Jain as Prateek
- Urvi Singh as Jasmine "Jazz"
- Anupriya Caroli as Zoya
- Sachin Singh as Rajat

=== Recurring ===
- Chirag Katrecha as Samarth "Sam"
- Tanya Sharma as Tanya Lekhi
- Preeti Chavan as Vandita Mathur, Aadhya's mother

== Production ==
The series was announced for Amazon miniTV. Rudhraksh Jaiswal, Aadhya Anand, Anupriya Caroli, Arjun Deswal, Naman Jain, Urvi Singh and Chirag Katrecha were approached to star in the series. The principal photography of the series commenced from September 2022. The trailer of the series was released on 7 January 2022 and 28 November 2022. The final and fourth season will be released on 9 February 2024.

== Episodes ==
=== Series overview ===
Series	Episodes	Originally released
1	6	12 January 2022
2	6	2 December 2022
3	6	10 November 2023
4	6	9 February 2024

=== Season 1 ===
No. overall	No. in season	Title	Original release date
1	1	"Super Sidey"	12 January 2022
2	2	"Crime and Punishment"	12 January 2022
3	3	"Bulati Hai Magar…"	12 January 2022
4	4	"Maa Ki Aankh"	18 January 2022
5	5	"Mera Pehla Pehla Valentine Hai"	26 January 2022
6	6	"Final Exam"	12 January 2022

=== Season 2 ===
No. overall	No. in season	Title	Original release date
1	1	"Sam Kahan Hai?"	2 December 2022
2	2	"Naam Wahi, Dosti Nayi"	2 December 2022
3	3	"Emotions Ki Wrong Delivery"	2 December 2022
4	4	"Chemistry"	2 December 2022
5	5	"Time Time Ki Baat Hai"	2 December 2022
6	6	"Winners and Losers"	2 December 2022

=== Season 3 ===
No. overall	No. in season	Title	Original release date
1	1	"Azaadi"	10 November 2023
2	2	"Ice Breaker"	10 November 2023
3	3	"Surprise Ya Shock"	10 November 2023
4	4	"Saavdhani Hati Durghatna Ghati"	10 November 2023
5	5	"Dil Dosti Dooriyan"	10 November 2023
6	6	"Picture Abhi Baaki Hai Mere Dost"	10 November 2023

=== Season 4 ===
No. overall	No. in season	Title	Original release date
1	1	"Dekho, Woh Aa Gaya!"	9 February 2024
2	2	"Hungama Ho Gaya!"	9 February 2024
3	3	"Mujhse Dosti Karoge?"	9 February 2024
4	4	"Humko Saathi Mil Gaya"	9 February 2024
5	5	"Do Dil Mil Rahe Hain, Magar.."	9 February 2024
6	6	"Fir Milenge...Chalte Chalte..."	9 February 2024

== Soundtrack ==
Crushed

Soundtrack album
- Released: 2022
- Genre: Soundtrack
- Language: Hindi
- Label: Dice Media
External audio
- Dil Kyun Hawa Mein on YouTube

Tracklisting
No.	Title	Length
1.	"Aadha Jahaan"	1:35
2.	"Dil Kyun Hawa Mein"	1:30

== Reception ==
The first three episode of Season 1 was reviewed by Akhila Damodaran for OTT Play who rated the series 3.5/5 stars.

Sunidhi Prajapat of OTT Play reviewed the Season 2 and awarded the series 3.5/5 stars. Archika Khurana of The Times of India reviewed the Season 2 and gave the series 3/5 stars.

Sonal Pandya of Times Now reviewed the Season 4 and rated the series 2.5/5 stars.

== Accolades ==
Year	Award ceremony	Category	Nominee / work	Result	Ref.
2023	Filmfare OTT Awards	Best Comedy Series	Crushed	Nominated	
2023	Filmfare OTT Awards	Best Actress in a Comedy Series	Aadhya Anand	Nominated	
2023	Filmfare OTT Awards	Best Supporting Actor in a Comedy Series	Naman Jain	Nominated	
