= Gulmohar (2023 film) =

2023 Indian film by Rahul V. Chittella

- Official release poster
- Directed by: Rahul V. Chittella
- Written by: Rahul V. Chittella; Arpita Mukherjee
- Produced by: Vikesh Bhutani; Rahul Chittella; Shujaat Saudagar
- Starring: Sharmila Tagore; Manoj Bajpayee; Simran; Suraj Sharma; Amol Palekar; Kaveri Seth
- Cinematography: Eeshit Narain
- Edited by: Tanupriya Sharma
- Music by: Siddhartha Khosla; Alan Demoss
- Production companies: Star Studios; Chalkboard Entertainment; Autonomous Works
- Distributed by: Disney+ Hotstar
- Release date: 3 March 2023
- Running time: 132 minutes
- Country: India
- Language: Hindi

Gulmohar (transl. Flame Tree) is a 2023 Indian Hindi-language family drama film written and directed by Rahul V. Chittella. The film stars Sharmila Tagore, Manoj Bajpayee, Simran, Suraj Sharma, Amol Palekar, and Kaveri Seth, amongst others. It was released on Disney+ Hotstar on 3 March 2023. It was featured in the 54th IFFI Indian panorama mainstream section.

At the 2023 Filmfare OTT Awards, Gulmohar received 14 nominations won 3 awards, including Best Actress in a Web Original Film (Critics) (Tagore) and Best Supporting Actor in a Web Original Film (Sharma). At the 70th National Film Awards, the film won the Best Feature Film in Hindi, Best Screenplay (Dialogues) (Mukherjee and Chittella), and Special Mention (feature film) (Bajpayee).

== Plot ==
The Batra family has been living in a house named "Gulmohar" for many decades. As their Gulmohar villa is being brought down to give way to a high rise, the family meets up for one last party before the packers and movers take over. However, over the course of ghazal and gossip, the discordant notes in their relationships get exposed and one gets sucked into their tumultuous present and turbulent past. The postcards of memories are riddled with cryptic messages on the destiny.

== Cast ==
- Sharmila Tagore as Kusum Batra
- Manoj Bajpayee as Arun Batra, Kusum Batra's son
- Simran as Indira "Indu" Batra, Arun Batra's wife
- Suraj Sharma as Aditya "Adi" Batra
- Amol Palekar as Sudhakar Batra
- Kaveri Seth as Divya Batra
- Utsavi Jha as Amrita "Amu" Batra
- Danish Sood as Ankur
- Anuraag Arora as Kamal Batra
- Devika Shahani as Neena Batra
- Sriharsh Sharma as Kishore Batra
- Santhy Balachandran as Reshma Saeed
- Jatin Goswami as Jeetendra "Jeetu" Kumar
- Chandan Roy as Param
- Gandharv Dewan as Irfan
- Talat Aziz as Avinash
- Vinod Nagpal as Baba, Arun's birth father
- Tanvi Rao as Deepika
- Abhinav Bhattacharjee as Radheshyam
- Tripti Sahu as Surekha
- Nargis Nandal as Payal
- Varun Narayan as Sameer
- Kanishk Seth as Rocky
- Deepak Bagga as Suri
- Hiba Qamar as Young Kusum
- Sanjina Gadhvi as Young Supriya

== Music ==
Gulmohar

Soundtrack album by Siddhartha Khosla, Alan Demoss
- Released: 25 February 2023
- Genre: Feature film soundtrack
- Length: 16:12
- Label: Zee Music Company

The music for the film composed by Siddhartha Khosla and Alan Demoss with lyrics written by Shellee.

No.	Title	Music	Singer(s)	Length
1.	"Dilkash"	Siddhartha Khosla	Talat Aziz	4:29
2.	"Sapno Ki Pakhi"	Siddhartha Khosla, Alan Demoss	Kavita Seth	4:39
3.	"Woh Ghar"	Siddhartha Khosla, Alan Demoss	Utsavi Jha	3:56
4.	"Hori Mein"	Siddhartha Khosla, Alan Demoss	Kavita Seth	3:03
Total length:				16:12

== Reception ==
Gulmohar received widespread critical acclaim. Critics praised the performances of Tagore, Bajpayee, and Simran.

On the review aggregator website Rotten Tomatoes, 91% of 11 critics' reviews are positive, with an average rating of 7.3/10. The film was highly praised by audiences too.

Saibal Chatterjee of NDTV gave the film giving 4 out of 5 stars and said that "there is a great deal of beauty in the muted melodrama", praising the cast's ensemble performance.

Alaka Sahani of The Indian Express drew a parallel between Gulmohar and Mira Nair's Monsoon Wedding and termed it as director Rahul V Chittella's Tribute to his mentor.

Dhaval Roy, writing for The Times of India, gave the movie 3.5 stars and gave particular praise to the acting performance of the cast stating that Tagore "is par excellence" and that "while Manoj is outstanding, so is Simran as his wife, Indu. The duo's individual performances are as noteworthy as their on-screen chemistry as husband and wife". He highlighted the "commendable performances" of the rest of the cast.

Monika Rawal Kukreja of Hindustan Times was more critical. While she praised the cast's performance she also stated that "the film needed much better editing" with certain subplots seeming "half-baked".

Sanjib Kalita in Gaysi critically examines the queer representation in the film, stating that "The queer representation in the film is mere tokenism, and is used to construct the illusion of diversity." Kalita further adds "Understanding female sexuality in isolation from class, the economy, and society is difficult. Society privileges men and stifles women’s desires, through various institutions like marriage (in this case, between Kusum and her husband), romantic relationships (between Ankur and Ambika), and forces women into compulsory heterosexuality. Director Rahul V. Chittella, who touches upon these subtleties, could have explored more by emphasizing the narratives of desire and longing while connecting critiques of heteronormativity to understandings of other social norms."

== Accolades ==
Year	Award ceremony	Category	Nominee / work	Result	Ref.
2023	Filmfare OTT Awards	Best Web Original Film	Gulmohar	Nominated	
2023	Filmfare OTT Awards	Best Director in a Web Original Film	Rahul V. Chittella	Nominated	
2023	Filmfare OTT Awards	Best Actress in a Web Original Film	Sharmila Tagore	Nominated	
2023	Filmfare OTT Awards	Best Actress in a Web Original Film (Critics)	Sharmila Tagore	Won	
2023	Filmfare OTT Awards	Best Actor in a Web Original Film	Manoj Bajpayee	Nominated	
2023	Filmfare OTT Awards	Best Supporting Actor in a Web Original Film	Suraj Sharma	Won	
2023	Filmfare OTT Awards	Best Supporting Actress in a Web Original Film	Simran	Nominated	
2023	Filmfare OTT Awards	Best Story (Web Original Film)	Rahul V. Chittella, Arpita Mukherjee	Nominated	
2023	Filmfare OTT Awards	Best Original Screenplay (Web Original Film)	Rahul V. Chittella, Arpita Mukherjee	Won	
2023	Filmfare OTT Awards	Best Original Dialogue (Web Original Film)	Rahul V. Chittella, Arpita Mukherjee	Nominated	
2023	Filmfare OTT Awards	Best Background Music (Web Original Film)	Siddhartha Khosla	Nominated	
2023	Filmfare OTT Awards	Best Production Design (Web Original Film)	Mansi Dhruv Mehta	Nominated	
2023	Filmfare OTT Awards	Best Cinematographer (Web Original Film)	Eeshit Narain	Nominated	
2023	Filmfare OTT Awards	Best Editing (Web Original Film)	Tanupriya Sharma	Nominated	
2023	Filmfare OTT Awards	Best Sound Design (Web Original Film)	P. M. Satheesh, Manoj M. Goswami	Nominated	
2024	National Film Awards	Best Feature Film in Hindi	Star India, Rahul V. Chittella	Won	
2024	National Film Awards	Best Screenplay (Dialogues)	Arpita Mukherjee, Rahul V Chittella	Won	
2024	National Film Awards	Special Mention	Manoj Bajpayee	Won	
