= Saas, Bahu Aur Flamingo =

2023 Indian TV series by Homi Adajania

- Promotional poster
- Genre: Crime drama
- Created by: Homi Adajania
- Written by: Saurav Dey; Karan Vyas; Nandini Gupta; Aman Mannan
- Story by: Homi Adajania
- Directed by: Homi Adajania
- Starring: Dimple Kapadia; Radhika Madan; Isha Talwar; Deepak Dobriyal; Angira Dhar; Jimit Trivedi; Naseeruddin Shah
- Composer: Sachin-Jigar
- Country of origin: India
- Original language: Hindi
- No. of seasons: 1
- No. of episodes: 8

Production
- Producer: Dinesh Vijan
- Cinematography: Linesh Desai; Sunil Borkar (2nd Unit DOP)
- Editor: A. Sreekar Prasad
- Running time: 40- 50 minutes
- Production company: Maddock Films

Original release
- Network: Disney+ Hotstar
- Release: 5 May 2023

Saas, Bahu Aur Flamingo is an Indian Hindi-language crime drama television series created and directed by Homi Adajania. Produced by Dinesh Vijan under Maddock Films, it stars Dimple Kapadia, Radhika Madan, Isha Talwar, Angira Dhar, Deepak Dobriyal, Monica Dogra and Naseeruddin Shah with an ensemble cast. The series premiered on Disney+ Hotstar on 5 May 2023.

At the 2023 Filmfare OTT Awards, Saas, Bahu Aur Flamingo received 5 nominations, including Best Actress in a Drama Series (Kapadia) and Best Supporting Actress in a Drama Series (Madan).

== Plot ==
A powerful matriarch leads a family that controls South Asia’s drug cartel, operating in the mythical region of Runjh Pradesh. Rani Cooperative, which presents itself as herbal products and doll-making business is a lucrative enterprise managed entirely by women.

Rani Ba (Kapadia), the gun-wielding, cigarette-smoking family matriarch in charge, is an inspiring saas to her two hardworking bahus, Kajal (Dhar) and Bijlee (Talwar), who function as henchmen, accountants, and peddlers as necessary. Then there's Shanta (Madan), Rani Ba's lone and spoiled daughter who manufactures the family business, flamingo, a stronger form of cocaine. Everyone envies Shanta's independence, but few realise she has affections for her adoptive brother Dhiman. Saas, Bahu, and Flamingo go about their business as normal until a series of threats force Rani Ba to decide it's time to name an heir.

== Cast ==
- Dimple Kapadia as Savitri alias 'Rani Baa', Bhola's widow, Harish, Kapil and Shanta's mother, Bijlee and Kajal's mother in law
- Isha Talwar as Bijlee, Harish's wife and Savitri's eldest daughter-in-law
- Angira Dhar as Kajal, Kapil's wife and Savitri's youngest daughter-in-law
- Radhika Madan as Shanta, Savitri's daughter; Harish and Kapil's younger sister
- Varun Mitra as Kapil, Savitri's younger son and Kajal's husband
- Ashish Verma as Harish, Savitri's eldest son and Bijlee's husband
- Deepak Dobriyal as Aagyo Dao alias 'Monk', Savitri's bitter rival
- Naseeruddin Shah as Saheb-ji, Savitri's mentor
- Monica Dogra as DJ Naina, Bijlee's lover
- Udit Arora as Dhiman, Savitri's friend's son
- Priyasha Bhardwaj as Young Savitri
- Sandeep Sharma as Bhola, Savitri's Husband
- Jimit Trivedi as Proshun Jain, Inspector Mumbai NCB ACP
- Vipin Sharma as Dil Samson
- Mark Bennington as Donze, Savitri's initial chemist for her operation and lover
- Sarika Singh as Shefu Jain, Proshun's wife
- Rohan Singh as Birsa
- Mahabir Singh Bhullar as Cheema
- Himanshu Awasthi as Jogi

== Episodes ==
Series	Episodes	Originally released
1	8	5 May 2023

No. overall	No. in season	Title	Directed by	Written by	Original release date
1	1	"Homecoming"	Homi Adajania	Saurav Dey, Nandini Gupta, Aman Mannan, Karan Vyas	5 May 2023
Savitri is preparing for the return of her sons. Although she, her bahus and her daughter face a deadly threat.
1	2	"Lifting the Veil"	Homi Adajania	Saurav Dey, Nandini Gupta, Aman Mannan, Karan Vyas	5 May 2023
They women of the haveli were successfully able to repel the attach on them but also had to hid it from Harish and Kapil.
1	3	"Genesis"	Homi Adajania	Saurav Dey, Nandini Gupta, Aman Mannan, Karan Vyas	5 May 2023
As Kapil and Harish discovers the secret, Savitri tells her life story to them. Monk joins with Dil Samson to destroy Savitri.
1	4	"Remains of the Day"	Homi Adajania	Saurav Dey, Nandini Gupta, Aman Mannan, Karan Vyas	5 May 2023
Savitri opens the pandora’s box by disclosing that she is going to pick her successor which may include her sons. Proshun comes close to discovering Savitri’s secret adventure.
1	5	"The Enemy Within"	Homi Adajania	Saurav Dey, Nandini Gupta, Aman Mannan, Karan Vyas	5 May 2023
Savitri is running out of time as enemies attack on her ship. Proshun’s being pressured to solve the case soon following the death in Mumbai. There is a death in the haveli causing panic.
1	6	"Bittersweet Bye-Bye"	Homi Adajania	Saurav Dey, Nandini Gupta, Aman Mannan, Karan Vyas	5 May 2023
While Proshun is digging deep in Savitri’s venture, Donze and Shanta continues to work on their new drug aka Pink Unicorn. Surrounding in the haveli is getting tense day by day, revealing many hidden facts and individual goals.
1	7	"The Day the Music Died"	Homi Adajania	Saurav Dey, Nandini Gupta, Aman Mannan, Karan Vyas	5 May 2023
Devastated by the death in haveli, Savitri seeks help from old ally Saheb-ji to save everyone from Monk's wrath.
1	8	"Resurrection"	Homi Adajania	Saurav Dey, Nandini Gupta, Aman Mannan, Karan Vyas	5 May 2023
Savitri has a tough job ahead which is to choose her ideal successor who can keep the soul of Rani corporative intact. Whom will she choose?

== Soundtrack ==
Saas Bahu Aur Flamingo

Soundtrack album by Sachin-Jigar
- Released: 5 May 2023 (Film)
- Recorded: 2022–23
- Language: Hindi
- Label: Sangeet Music
- Producer: Sachin-Jigar

Track-List
No.	Title	Singer(s)	Length
1.	"Folk Song (Ada Sai)"	Divya Kumar, Devra Samatbhai Gadhvi, Vandana Devraj Gadhvi
2.	"Folk Song (Kutch Minar)"	Mubarak Gazan, Dana Bhamral, Lakha Marvada

== Reception ==
The Hindu wrote "The series is entertaining for its mollycoddling (in a mocking way) of fragile male egos."

Saibal Chatterjee of NDTV wrote "No matter how firm and focussed the unbending Savitri is, reverses are a part of her existence. A backstory reveals the reasons behind the transformation of a Banjara woman into an imperious and impetuous ringleader."

Sukanya Verma of Rediff.com felt the series overdoses on sex, violence and drugs and wrote in her review "There are attempts to document its crooked universe and its shady workings in detail like Farzi but none of the spunk. Guns and ghagras make for a fine punchline but the imagery feels bland in absence of emotions."

A critic from India Today rated the series 3.5 stars out of 5, and wrote "Saas, Bahu Aur Flamingo is a show where women are the frontrunners. There’s no running-in-your-face feminism. It just feels too fair and fresh, different from the imposed shows of the same nature that you see. Here, women are no abla but can take on hordes of men, even when they are the least prepared."

The Times of India wrote "The show's setting in the parched and arid land of north-western India is pitch perfect, and the costumes and makeup of each character is impressive. The rustic makeovers complete with ancient tattoos and ethnic ornaments have the requisite detailing."

== Accolades ==
Year	Award ceremony	Category	Nominee / work	Result	Ref.
2023	Filmfare OTT Awards	Best Actress in a Drama Series	Dimple Kapadia	Nominated	
2023	Filmfare OTT Awards	Best Supporting Actress in a Drama Series	Radhika Madan	Nominated	
2023	Filmfare OTT Awards	Best Original Story (Series)	Homi Adajania	Nominated	
2023	Filmfare OTT Awards	Best Cinematographer (Series)	Linesh Desai	Nominated	
2023	Filmfare OTT Awards	Best Costume Design (Series)	Maxima Basu	Nominated	

== See also ==
- List of Disney+ Hotstar original programming
