= Qala (film) =

2022 Indian film by Anvita Dutt

- Official poster
- Directed by: Anvita Dutt
- Written by: Anvita Dutt
- Produced by: Karnesh Ssharma; Anushka Sharma
- Starring: Tripti Dimri; Swastika Mukherjee; Babil Khan
- Cinematography: Siddharth Diwan
- Edited by: Manas Mittal
- Music by: Songs: Amit Trivedi; Sagar Desai; Background Score: Sagar Desai
- Production company: Clean Slate Filmz
- Distributed by: Netflix
- Release date: 1 December 2022
- Running time: 119 minutes
- Country: India
- Language: Hindi

Qala (lit. 'Art') is a 2022 Indian Hindi-language period psychological drama film, written and directed by Anvita Dutt. The film is produced by Karnesh Ssharma under Clean Slate Filmz and stars Tripti Dimri, Swastika Mukherjee, and Babil Khan in his film debut.

Qala was released on Netflix on 1 December 2022. It is loosely based on K. Viswanath's Swathi Kiranam, and Miloš Forman's Amadeus.

At the 2023 Filmfare OTT Awards, Qala received 6 nominations, including Best Web Original Film, Best Actress in a Web Original Film (Dimri) and Best Supporting Actress in a Web Original Film (Mukherjee), and won Best Production Design (Web Original Film) (Meenal Agarwal).

== Plot ==
Set in the 1940s, Qala is about the tumultuous relationship between an aspiring singer and her domineering mother. The movie begins with Qala Manjushree, who has just won the "Golden Vinyl." She is being interviewed by several journalists who mention her brother. Distraught, Qala replies that she does not have a brother. In a flashback, her mother, Urmila, who was pregnant with twins, gives birth to Qala, but her stillborn brother does not survive. In a fit of rage, Urmila attempts to smother Qala.

Urmila teaches Qala the art of music but warns her against being a courtesan. Qala is haunted by visions of her brother, who accuses her of taking what is rightfully his, for which a doctor advises her to rest. In another flashback, Qala is being taught music for a performance in 3 days, but Urmila chides her and accuses her of not working hard enough. To punish her, Urmila locks Qala out in the snow. At the performance, few people show up, and Qala is upstaged by an orphan, Jagan. Urmila takes a liking to his music and brings him home to live with her, to the dismay of Qala, who is jealous of him. In the present, a renowned singer, Sanyal, has died. It is revealed that her mother seduced Sanyal to obtain a chance for Jagan to sing with him. To further Jagan's career, Urmila attempts to marry Qala off but she refuses. Urmila hosts a party and invites several influential people. At the party, Qala feels invisible but is noticed by Sanyal, whom she kisses.

Jagan falls sick and cannot sing so Qala sings instead, impressing the guests. Jagan's sickness worsens to the point of being unable to sing but is cared for by Urmila. Qala seduces Sumant Kumar to obtain a chance to record a song, taking Jagan's place. That night, Jagan talks to Qala one last time before he hangs himself in the forest. The next day, Qala discovers his body and hugs his corpse. Her mother is distraught and cradles Jagan in her hands. Urmila and Qala have a fight during which Qala calls Urmila a courtesan, after which she forbids Qala from coming back to their house ever again. Qala leaves for Calcutta for her recording session. She is nervous and cannot sing even on the 11th take. For a last chance, she is forced to provide oral pleasure to Sumant. She recalls Jagan, who said that he always sung for himself. Using this mindset, she successfully records the song. Qala slowly rises to fame as a singer, becoming close with Majrooh, the songwriter who advises her to cease her arrangement with Sumant.

While being interviewed by journalists again, she sees another vision of Jagan. While recording a song, she breaks down and sees snow falling all around her. Her mother hears her interview being broadcast over the radio. In a flashback, Qala is shown dropping a globule of mercury into Jagan's milk before his performance, leading to his sickness. She attempts to kill herself by overdosing on sleeping pills. Her doctor calls her mother and informs her of Qala's suicide attempt. Her mother comes to Calcutta to visit her, but finds that she has hanged herself. Later, she tearfully listens to Qala's vinyl which Qala had sent to her in Tanuku.

== Cast ==
- Tripti Dimri as Qala Manjushree
  - Aadhya Jha as young Qala
- Swastika Mukherjee as Urmila "Urmi" Manjushree
- Babil Khan as Jagan Batwal
- Amit Sial as Sumant Kumar
- Sameer Kochhar as Chandan Lal Sanyal
- Girija Oak as Sudha
- Swanand Kirkire as Mansoor Khan Sahab
- Tasveer Kamil as Naseeban Appa
- Varun Grover as Majrooh
- Nitin Chatterjee as Radio Interviewer
- Veera Kapur EE as Rani Mandira
- Abhishek Banerjee as Dr. Banerjee
- Alireza-Jadidi (voice)
- Anushka Sharma as Devika (special appearance) (Marks her last appearance in films after her appearance in 2018 and before her long hiatus)

== Production ==
The film was announced by Netflix on 10 April 2021, Tripti Dimri was cast in the title role, and was joined by Babil Khan. The film marks the second collaboration between Tripti Dimri, Anvita Dutt and Clean Slate Filmz after Bulbbul (2020).

Principal photography started in April 2021, in Kashmir. Filming was completed in October 2021.

== Soundtrack ==
Qala

Soundtrack album by Amit Trivedi, Sagar Desai
- Released: 24 November 2022
- Recorded: 2021
- Genre: Feature film soundtrack
- Length: 25:24
- Language: Hindi
- Labels: Netflix, Sony Music India

The music for the film was composed by Amit Trivedi, the background score was composed by Sagar Desai, while guest-composed one song "Udh Jaayega" and lyrics were written by Amitabh Bhattacharya, Swanand Kirkire, Varun Grover and Kausar Munir. The teaser of the ghazal, "Phero Na Najariya", was released on 29 August 2022. The first single "Ghodey Pe Sawaar" was released on 16 November 2022. The second single "Rubaaiyaan" was released on 22 November 2022. The third single "Shauq" was released on 24 November 2022. The film also included a remake of a popular Kangri folk song, "Amma Puchdi", sung by Sireesha Bhagavatula.

No.	Title	Lyrics	Music	Singer(s)	Length
1.	"Ghodey Pe Sawaar"	Amitabh Bhattacharya	Amit Trivedi	Sireesha Bhagavatula	3:14
2.	"Rubaaiyaan"	Swanand Kirkire	Amit Trivedi	Shahid Mallya, Sireesha Bhagavatula	4:13
3.	"Shauq"	Varun Grover	Amit Trivedi	Swanand Kirkire, Shahid Mallya, Sireesha Bhagavatula	3:39
4.	"Phero Na Najariya"	Kausar Munir	Amit Trivedi	Sireesha Bhagavatula	4:00
5.	"Nirbhau Nirvair"	Sant Kabir, Anvitaa Dutt	Amit Trivedi	Shahid Mallya	5:08
6.	"Udh Jaayega"	Sant Kabir	Sagar Desai	Shahid Mallya	4:37
Total length:					24:57

== Marketing and release ==
The teaser for the film launched on 24 September 2022, on Netflix, and the trailer of the film was released on 15 November 2022.

The film had its World Premiere in Goa at the 53rd International Film Festival of India, on 24 November 2022. Qala was released on Netflix on 1 December 2022.

== Reception ==
On the review aggregator website Rotten Tomatoes, 80% of 15 critics' reviews are positive, with an average rating of 5.7/10.

Professional ratings
Review scores
Source	Rating
India TV	3.5/5 stars
NDTV	3.5/5 stars
Pinkvilla	4/5 stars
The Indian Express	2.5/5 stars
The Times of India	3.5/5 stars

Debiparna Chakraborty of MovieWeb wrote, "Anvita Dutt’s 2022 psychological drama Qala holds up a mirror to misogyny through a neo-expressionist lens with its distorted shadows and angles. From Amit Trivedi’s music to Siddharth Diwan’s cinematography, Qala weaves a beautiful but harrowing and tragic tale of loss, grief, and desire that starts off in the snowy moors of Shimla and ends in a burnished manor of Calcutta."

Renuka Vyavahare of The Times of India wrote, "A fictitious period drama about a playback singer, Qala treads an unfamiliar, unspoken path in terms of relationships. It looks beyond the obvious to explore the underlying complexities of a mother-daughter equation, a rare sight in Hindi cinema. The latter has either overlooked or villainised the conflict for the gallery. Qala dares to observe the raw, even ugly insides of a seemingly normalised relationship with heart aching longing and regret at its core."

== Accolades ==
Year	Award ceremony	Category	Nominee / work	Result	Ref.
2023	Filmfare OTT Awards	Best Web Original Film	Qala	Nominated	
2023	Filmfare OTT Awards	Best Actress in a Web Original Film	Triptii Dimri	Nominated	
2023	Filmfare OTT Awards	Best Supporting Actress in a Web Original Film	Swastika Mukherjee	Nominated	
2023	Filmfare OTT Awards	Best Background Music (Web Original Film)	Sagar Desai	Nominated	
2023	Filmfare OTT Awards	Best Production Design (Web Original Film)	Meenal Agarwal	Won	
2023	Filmfare OTT Awards	Best Cinematographer (Web Original Film)	Siddharth Diwan	Nominated	

== See also ==
- List of Netflix original films
