= Made in Heaven (2019 film) =

2019 romantic drama film by Toka McBaror

- Directed by: Toka McBaror
- Produced by: Darlington Abuda
- Starring: Richard Mofe Damijo; Jide Kosoko; Nancy Isime; Ayo Makun; Lasisi Elenu
- Release date: 2019
- Country: Nigeria
- Language: English

Made in Heaven is a 2019 Nigerian romantic drama film directed by Toka McBaror and produced by Darlington Abuda. It features Richard Mofe-Damijo, Jide Kosoko, Nancy Isime, Ayo Makun, Toyin Abraham, Blossom Chukwujekwu, Lasisi Elenu, former Big Brother Naija housemate Kemen, among others. The film follows its central characters as they seek spiritual help in their daily lives.

== Plot ==
After discovering that his girlfriend was cheating on him with a friend, shy Richard leaves her behind in disgust in the club only to meet Angela who had a similar encounter. On the same night, they died and on a queue to the Gate of Judgement, Angela was told to return to Earth. Richard then sought a way and escaped to fight for Angela's love, although forbidden by the guardian angel who was sent after him alongside demons to ensure he never succeeds in winning her love within seven days, failure of which would result to his soul being condemned.

== Cast ==
- Ayo Makun as Ouse
- Richard Mofe-Damijo as Lucius
- Blossom Chukwujekwu as Richard
- Nancy Isime as Verita
- Toyin Abraham as DPO
- Uche Nwaefuna as Angela
- Jide Kosoko as Mr. Kemi
- Lasisi Elenu as Azazel
- Sam Sunny as Ola
- Dauda Adewale as EMT 1
- Donia Mako Adewoye as waitress 1
- Amaka Ann Amamchukwu as demon lady
- Ara Deinde as fine artist
- Eso Dike as Jay
- Joy Ebiem as Mayowa

== Production ==
The film was produced by Peekaboo Consulting Limited. It was co-produced with Newlink Entertainment Limited, NewOhens Limited and Corporate World Entertainment Limited.

== Release ==
The film was scheduled for release in the summer of 2019. It premiered on 15 September 2019 at the IMAX Theatre in Lekki, Lagos, Nigeria.
