= Lust Stories 2 =

2023 Indian anthology film

- Official release poster
- Directed by: R. Balki; Konkona Sen Sharma; Sujoy Ghosh; Amit Ravindernath Sharma
- Produced by: Ronnie Screwvala; Ashi Dua Sara
- Starring: Tamannaah Bhatia; Mrunal Thakur; Kumud Mishra; Angad Bedi; Amruta Subhash; Neena Gupta; Kajol; Tillotama Shome; Vijay Varma; Jeniffer Piccinato
- Cinematography: Tapan Tushar Basu; P. C. Sreeram; Anand Bansal
- Edited by: Urvashi Saxena; Nayan H. K. Bhadra; Sanyukta Kaza; Chandrashekhar Prajapati
- Music by: Raja Narayan Deb; Aman Pant; Sagar Desai; Subhajit Mukherjee
- Production companies: RSVP Movies; Flying Unicorn Entertainment; Hope Productions; The Vermillion World; Chrome Pictures
- Distributed by: Netflix
- Release date: 29 June 2023
- Running time: 132 minutes
- Country: India
- Language: Hindi

Lust Stories 2 is a 2023 Indian Hindi-language anthology film, and second installment of Lust Stories, consisting of four short film segments directed by R. Balki, Konkona Sen Sharma, Amit Ravindernath Sharma and Sujoy Ghosh. Co-produced by Ronnie Screwvala of RSVP and Ashi Dua Sara of Flying Unicorn Entertainment, the film has an ensemble cast including Tamannaah Bhatia, Mrunal Thakur, Kumud Mishra, Amruta Subhash, Angad Bedi, Neena Gupta, Kajol, Tillotama Shome, Vijay Varma, Jeniffer Piccinato and others. It was released on Netflix on 29 June 2023.

At the 2023 Filmfare OTT Awards, Lust Stories 2 received 5 nominations, including Best Web Original Film and Best Director in a Web Original Film (Sen Sharma), and won 2 awards – Best Web Original Film (Critics) and Best Supporting Actress in a Web Original Film (Subhash).

== Plot ==
=== Made for Each Other (R. Balki) ===
On paper, Arjun and Veda are the perfect couple. They share the same goals and ambitions, and come from similar professional and family backgrounds. Their parents happily meet to arrange their match, but Veda's grandmother (dadi) refuses their union. She wants the couple to have sex first - despite premarital sex historically being taboo in India - so that they can be sure they have sexual chemistry. Dadi says their marriage will fall apart without it. Arjun and Veda kiss in his car, and after a night of clubbing, have sex in a hotel. Veda confesses to dadi in the morning that she did not orgasm. Dadi encourages Veda to keep trying, and after many nights together, both Arjun and Veda claim to have successfully attained climax. They believe they are now ready for marriage. Dadi is pleased with this news, and consents to their union.

=== The Mirror (Konkona Sen Sharma) ===
Ishita lives alone in a large apartment. One afternoon, she comes home to find her maid, Seema, and her husband having sex in her bed. Rather than confront them, Ishita hides in a closet. She masturbates herself to sleep that night. Realising she gets pleasure from being a voyeur, she 'joins' their daily ritual and observes them having sex everyday. Seema is alerted to Ishita's spying habit through a mirror, but says nothing to her or her husband. She starts taking pleasure in being watched. One afternoon, both women are forced to confront each other in the apartment. They argue wildly, and Seema is fired. On a grocery run, both women bump into each other. Neither has successfully moved on from their arrangement. Unspoken words are exchanged, and the 'ritual' resumes the next day as Seema is re-hired.

=== Sex with the Ex (Sujoy Ghosh) ===
Vijay has a strained relationship with his wife, Anu. While videocalling from his car, he crashes. He seeks help in a nearby village, where he hears a familiar voice - his ex-wife, Shanti's - who mysteriously disappeared many years ago. Shanti suggests Vijay should leave or it might "get late", but he refuses. They discuss her disappearance, and Vijay reveals he married Anu soon after, also inheriting his new father-in-law's company. He and Shanti have sex, and she mentions the pregnancy test she took before her disappearance. It comes to light that Vijay planned her death/disappearance for a better life with Anu. Shanti confronts him, but he kills her again, then escapes to his car. Outside, onlookers are removing his limp body from the crash. Shanti (her ghost) reappears; Vijay realises he has died, and starts to scream.

=== Tilchatta (Amit Ravindernath Sharma) ===
While returning to his palace, disgraced aging prince, Suraj, spots his palace-maid walking home alone. He blocks her path, then drags her into nearby fields to rape her. The maid stops coming to work, forcing Suraj's wife, Devyani, to hire a replacement. She hears of a prostitute, who recently contracted HIV after having sex with a client, and decides to hire her. Devyani hopes Suraj will learn a lesson, when the disease passes to him too. Rekha, the former prostitute, immediately catches Suraj's attention as she mops the palace floor and washes clothes out in the open. Suraj summons her on the pretext of needing a massage, then offers her alcohol. In her inebriated state, he tries to disrobe her by taking off her blouse. However, Ankur (Devyani's son from another partner) walks in at the same time, forcing Suraj to leave. He spends the evening drinking heavily. At night, sounds fill the palace of Rekha moaning with passion. Devyani assumes Suraj is forcing himself on to Rekha, but he is intoxicated and passed out in the courtyard. In horror, Devyani realises that Rekha is having sex with Ankur, her son and the only other male in the house, who is unaware of her having HIV.

== Cast ==
=== Made For Each Other ===
- Mrunal Thakur as Veda M. Kaushal
- Neena Gupta as Kamli Kaushal, Veda's grandmother
- Angad Bedi as Arjun Bhalla, Veda's fiancé
- Kanupriya Pandit as Mohini M. Kaushal, Veda's mother
- Hemant Kher as Mohan P. Kaushal, Veda's father

=== The Mirror ===
- Tillotama Shome as Ishita Sengupta
- Amruta Subhash as Seema K. Mhatre, Ishita's house help
- Konkona Sen Sharma as Sameera Sen (Voice-over), Ishita's friend
- Shrikant Yadav as Kamal Mhatre, Seema's husband

=== Sex With Ex ===
- Vijay Varma as Vijay Chouhan
- Tamannaah Bhatia as Shanti, Vijay's ex-wife
- Mukti Mohan as Anita "Anu", Vijay's second wife
- Jeniffer Piccinato as Nisha, Vijay's girlfriend
- Jugal Hansraj as David Chaudhary
- Tarun Khanna as Inspector Inderjit Singh

=== Tilchatta ===
- Kajol as Smt. Devyani Singh / Chanda, Suraj Singh's mistress
- Kumud Mishra as Maharaj Suraj Bhanumal Singh of Lal Kotla
- Anushka Kaushik as Rekha
- Zeeshan Nadaf as Kuwar Ankur Singh, Suraj Singh's step son, Chanda's son
- Payal Pande as Batari, Suraj Singh's house maid
- Vibha Chibber as Mausi, brothel madam

== Music ==
Lust Stories 2

Soundtrack album
- Released: 8 June 2023 (First Single)
- Recorded: 2018
- Studio: Netflix
- Genre: Feature Film soundtrack
- Language: Hindi
- Label: Sangeet Music

Track listing
No.	Title	Lyrics	Music	Singer(s)	Length
1.	"Khelo Khellum"	Shellee	Aman Pant	Aman Pant, Kinjal Chatterjee, Sapna Sand	2:22
2.	"Jab Koi Baat Bigad Jaaye"	Indeevar	Rajesh Roshan (original), Raja Narayan Deb (recreated)	Marianne D'Cruz Aiman, Shazneen Arethna, Crystal Sequeira, Dean Valerian Sequeira, Thomson Andrews, Rahul Pandey

== Release ==
The film was released on Netflix on 29 June 2023.

== Reception ==
On the review aggregator website Rotten Tomatoes, 60% of 10 critics' reviews are positive, with an average rating of 6.5/10.

Sukanya Verma from Rediff.com reviewed Lust Stories 2 as a diverse anthology that explores lust beyond sexual aspects, gave a rating of 3 out of 5 stars. She praised Konkona Sen Sharma's segment for its intimate storytelling and social context. The segment delves into the primal nature of lust between two characters, portrayed by Tillotama Shome and Amruta Subhash. Verma further discusses Sujoy Ghosh's segment, which explores the encounters of Vijay Varma and Tamannaah Bhatia, delving into the subconscious and guilt. She mentions the fanciful visuals and eerie atmosphere of the segment, which focuses less on explicit representations of sex and more on the toxic nature of lust within an individual. She appreciated the enigmatic and imperfect nature of Amit Ravindernath Sharma's concluding segment, addressing domestic violence and casteism. Verma expressed disappointment in the anthology's lack of queer narratives but acknowledged its potential as a streaming franchise. Saibal Chatterjee of NDTV rated the film 3/5 and she described it as a mixed bag of stories and themes. While bursts of passion are present, Chatterjee felt that they are not the main focus. The opening story is criticized for its sterile approach, but Neena Gupta's performance stands out. "The Mirror" is highlighted as the turning point, exploring female desire in a complex manner. "Sex with Ex" is a genre exercise with the captivating performances of leads, who bring chemistry and intrigue to their roles as a woman who vanished mysteriously and her one-time husband, while "Tilchatta" provides a fitting end with Kajol's solid performance. Overall, Chatterjee felt that the show offers a range of narratives, delivering occasional passionate storytelling.

Shubhra Gupta writing for The Indian Express found Konkona Sen Sharma's segment, "The Mirror," to be the most complex and satisfying. Gupta criticized the lack of passion and avoidance of intimacy in the first episode. The third episode left the reviewer confused about its genre. Gupta praised the performances in the fourth episode but noted the smaller impact of the marquee name, Kajol. Overall, Gupta appreciated the exploration of class and desire in "The Mirror" but criticized the lack of representation of marginalized communities in the anthology. The anthology exploring desi sexuality, receives positive feedback from Monika Rawal Kukreja of Hindustan Times. She highlights the engaging nature of anthologies and praises the four filmmakers for their different perspectives on female sexuality. Kukreja particularly enjoys Konkona Sen Sharma's segment and appreciates the performances of Tillotama Shome and Amruta Subhash. While she finds Sujoy Ghosh's segment to be the weakest, she credits Amit Sharma's segment for its twist in the climax. Overall, Kukreja recommends Lust Stories 2 for its brilliant performances and the message it portrays.

== Accolades ==
Year	Award ceremony	Category	Nominee / work	Result	Ref.
2023	Filmfare OTT Awards	Best Web Original Film	Lust Stories 2	Nominated	
2023	Filmfare OTT Awards	Best Web Original Film (Critics)	Lust Stories 2	Won	
2023	Filmfare OTT Awards	Best Director in a Web Original Film	Konkona Sen Sharma	Nominated	
2023	Filmfare OTT Awards	Best Supporting Actress in a Web Original Film	Amruta Subhash	Won	
2023	Filmfare OTT Awards	Best Story (Web Original Film)	Pooja Tolani, Konkona Sen Sharma	Nominated	
2023	Filmfare OTT Awards	Best Original Screenplay (Web Original Film)	Pooja Tolani, Konkona Sen Sharma	Nominated	

== See also ==
- List of Netflix India originals
