= Kohrra =

Netflix crime thriller series

- Season 2 poster
- Genre: Crime thriller
- Created by: Sudip Sharma; Gunjit Chopra; Diggi Sisodia
- Written by: Sudip Sharma; Gunjit Chopra; Diggi Sisodia
- Directed by: Randeep Jha (S01); Sudip Sharma (S02); Faisal Rahman (S02)
- Starring: Barun Sobti; Suvinder Vicky; Mona Singh; Rachel Shelley; Harleen Sethi; Manish Chaudhari; Saurav Khurana; Vishal Handa
- Music by: Naren Chandavarkar; Benedict Taylor
- Country of origin: India
- Original language: Punjabi
- No. of seasons: 2
- No. of episodes: 12

Production
- Producer: Rohit Jayaswal
- Cinematography: Saurabh Monga
- Editor: Sanyukta Kaza
- Running time: 38–60 minutes
- Production company: Clean Slate Filmz

Original release
- Network: Netflix
- Release: 15 July 2023 – present

Kohrra is an Indian Punjabi-language crime thriller police procedural television series on Netflix created by Sudip Sharma, Gunjit Chopra, Diggi Sisodia and directed by Randeep Jha Produced under Karnesh Ssharma's Clean Slate Filmz in collaboration with Netflix, the series stars Barun Sobti, Suvinder Vicky, Harleen Sethi, Saurav Khurana, Rachel Shelley and Manish Chaudhary in lead roles. The first season of the series premiered on 15 July 2023 on Netflix. The second season of Kohrra premiered on Netflix on 11 February 2026. Mona Singh and Rannvijay Singha joined the cast of the show in the second season. The release date was announced by Netflix India, which also unveiled the first official poster for the season.

At the 2023 Filmfare OTT Awards, Kohrra received 9 nominations, including Best Drama Series and Best Director in a Drama Series (Jha), and won 5 awards, including Best Director in a Series (Critics) (Jha), Best Actor in a Drama Series (Vicky) and Best Supporting Actor in a Drama Series (Sobti).

== Premise ==
=== Season 1 ===
A bridegroom is found dead in a field two days before his wedding and the police try to find the murderer.

=== Season 2 ===
A woman is found dead in her brother's barn and the police try to find the murderer.

== Cast ==
=== Season 1 ===
- Suvinder Vicky as Sub-inspector Balbir Singh, Police station Jagrana, Punjab Police, Nimrat's Father, Raman's Father-in-law, Golu's maternal Grandfather
- Barun Sobti as ASI Amarpal Jasjit Garundi, Police station Jagrana, Punjab Police, Jung's younger brother, Rajji's brother-in-law, Silky's Husband
- Harleen Sethi as Nimrat Kaur, Balbir's daughter, Raman's wife, Golu's mother, Karan Gill's girlfriend
- Vishal Handa as Tejinder 'Paul' Dhillon, an NRI, lawyer in London, Steve's son, Veera's fiancé, Liam's best friend.
- Ivantiy Novak as Liam Murphy, a British national, Clara's son, Paul's best friend.
- Rachel Shelley as Clara Murphy, Liam's mother, Steve Dhillon's family friend from UK
- Manish Chaudhary as Satwinder 'Steve' Dhillon, Paul's father, Manna's elder brother, Jaswinder's husband
- Lokesh Batta as Karan Gill, Nimrat's love interest, Samsher's Grandchild
- Mahabir Bhullar as Shamsher Gill, Owner of Gill Construction, Karan's Grandfather
- Saurav Khurana as Saakar Khurana, an Instagram rapper, Veera's ex-boyfriend
- Varun Badola as Maninder 'Manna' Dhillon, Steve's younger brother, Happy's father, Paul's uncle, Jassi's brother-in-law
- Aanand Priya as Veera Soni, Paul's fiancée, Saakar's ex-girlfriend
- Arjuna Bhalla as Jaswinder 'Jassi' Dhillon, Steve's wife, Paul's mother, Manna's sister-in-law
- Ekavali Khanna as Indira Chhabra, widow of a police informer Navdeep Chhabra
- Amaninder Pal Singh as Happy Dhillon, Manna's son, owner of Happy car showroom, Jagrana
- Zubin Mehta as Raman Singh, Nimrat's husband, Golu's Dad, Balbir's son in law
- Gantavya Sharma as Param 'Golu' Singh, Raman and Nimrat's son, Balbir's Grandson
- Dishi Duggal as Veera's mother
- Rakesh Singh as Veera's father
- Hardeep Guru as Head constable Jaggi, Police station Jagrana, Punjab police
- Lakha Singh as SHO Sukhpal Mangat, Police station Jagrana, Punjab police
- Sudeep Singh as SSP Ajeet Sikka, Punjab police
- Navtej Johar as Dr Paramjit Johal, Medical expert and Government Doctor
- Tarun Kapoor as Divorce Lawyer of Nimrat
- Sumit Gulati as Pramod Kumar, Private bus driver, Employee of Jarnail Transport
- Vikas Neb as Navdeep 'Nopi' Chabbra, an informer of SI Balbir Singh, Indira's dead husband
- Murari Kumar as Manoj Kumar, Mehndi artist, relative of Pramod Kumar
- Ekta Sodhi as Rajji Garundi, Amarpal's sister-in-law and sexual partner, Jung's wife
- Pardeep Singh Cheema as Jung Garundi, a farmer from Jagrana, Punjab, Amarpal's elder brother, Rajji's husband
- Veerpal Kaur Gill as Police Constable Satnam, Police station Jagrana, Punjab police
- Gaurav Grover as Harmandeep Sodhi, Crime journalist for News Channel Sadda pind 365
- Muskan Arora as Silky, Amarpal's fiancée
- Bittu Gupta as Kinny, kabaddi player from Nakowal, Punjab, Rano's boyfriend
- Sneha Singh as Rano, Girl with whom Kinny was having sex in the morning in the open field near the murder site of NRI Paul Dhillon
- Rajinder Singh as Punjabi Journalist beaten by rod by Steve Dhillon
- Rohit Sharma as attendant at Gas station
- Narendra Thakur as Steve Dhillon's house help in India
- Samuel John as Shinda, Truck driver
- Navdeep Singh as Toti, cleaner of truck driver Shinda
- Neeraj Kaushik as Satish Ahuja, Drug supplier
- Arman Kokri as Kartik Ahuja, Satish's Son
- Tabish Raj as Manager at Chaska Bar
- Rik Dev as Waiter at Chaska Bar
- Deepak Arora as Manager, Happy Car Showroom, Jagrana, Punjab
- Mahender Singh as Kulli's Landlord
- Rajesh Khurana as Manager, Baba ji da pizza
- Inderpal Singh as Pizza delivery Guy, Baba ji da pizza
- Jaga Singh as Kulli, Drug dealer and delivery boy of Baba ji da pizza food cart
- Sukhwinder Virk as Kulli's mother
- Karan Chibber as Bank Manager, Induslund bank
- Vishipreet as Roop, Truck driver Shinda's lover
- Simmi as Eunuch Pooja Mani, a friend of Roop and Shinda
- Babita Kapoor as Shinda's wife
- Anmol Charan as Shinda's son
- Abhimanyu Yadav as Body builder at Gym, Ex-wrestling player from Punjab
- Suhana as Little Nimrat Kaur
- Akaash Shemar as Teen Paul Dhillon
- Lewis Baxter as Teen Liam Murphy

=== Season 2 ===
- Mona Singh as Sub-Inspector Dhanwant Kaur, Dalerpura Police Station, Punjab Police
- Barun Sobti as ASI Amarpal Jasjit Garundi, Dalerpura Police Station, Punjab Police
- Davinder Singh as Constable Aujla
- Bhupinder Kaur as Constable Harpreet
- Harshita Verma as Constable Gurkirat
- Harmandeep Singh as ASI Balkar Singh
- Pooja Bhamrah as Preet Bajwa, the victim whose murder was to be investigated
- Rannvijay Singha as Sam Bajwa, Preet’s husband
- Daljit Singh as Sam's father
- Amaira Pahuja as Nikki, Preet's daughter
- Zohraab Singh Rang as Juno, Preet's son
- Neeru Sehgal as Loveleen, Nikki and Juno's Nanny
- Anurag Arora as Baljinder Atwal, Preet’s brother
- Mandeep Kaur Ghai as Twinkle Atwal, Baljinder's wife, Preet's sister-in-law
- Parminder Pal Kaur as Hasimrat Atwal, Preet and Baljinder's mother
- Ajunee Singla as Sifat, Baljinder's daughter
- Shaira Handa as Mehr, Baljinder's other daughter
- Deepak Kumar as Karamjot, Baljinder's brother in law
- Gurjant Singh Marahar as Pamma, Karamjot's bouncer
- Pooja Pathak as Mahi Verma, Baljinder's Mistress
- Jasvir Kumar as Watchman Kanni, who witnessed a verbal altercation between Preet and Johnny
- Balwinder Bullet as Watchman Malli, whose neglect causes fire at the 'Atwal and Son's poultry farm'
- Rajwinder Singh Dhaliwal as Lakkha, Malli's friend
- Priyanka Charan as Charu, Preet's best friend
- Abhishek Sharma as Charu's husband
- Rana Ranbir as Raju Sirda
- Ekta Sodhi as Rajji, Garundi's sister-in-law
- Pardeep Singh Cheema as Jung, Gaurundi's brother
- Muskan Arora as Silky, Garundi's wife
- Amandeep Bhogal as Silky's mother
- Vikhyat Gulati as Johnny Malang
- Shashi Bhushan as Peter Malang, Johnny's father
- Vinod Kumar Kaushal as Harish Duggal, landlord of Johnny Malang's Studio
- Leela Victoria Devir Woodman as Ariel, an Israeli woman, allegedly Johnny's lover in Manali
- Kaguirong Gonmei as the monk in whose monastery Ariel attended a course on meditation
- Pradhuman Singh as Jagdish Sood, Dhanwant's husband
- Kabir Nanda as Nihal Sood, Dhanwant's expired son
- Amarjeet Singh as Kartar Arshi, worker at Jagdish's Tailor Shop
- Ranbeer Singh Sidhu as Ravi Sharin, Preet's lawyer
- Prayrak Mehta as Arun Kumar, a migrant from Jharkhand who is in search of his father Rakesh Kumar
- Satyakam Anand as Rakesh Kumar, a migrant bonded labour
- Amit Yadav as Manoj, owner of the food stall in which Arun works
- Deep Mandeep as Tavleen Singh, In-charge of an NGO for missing persons
- Swastik Bhagat as the school boy who offers candy to Rakesh Kumar
- Jaideep Ahlawat as the railway lineman (cameo)
- Sidharth Bhardwaj as SHO Aseem Khatri

== Episodes ==
Series	Episodes	Originally released
1	6	15 July 2023
2	6	11 February 2026

=== Season 1 ===
No.	Title	Directed by	Written by	Original release date
1	"Episode 1"	Randeep Jha	Gunjit Chopra, Diggi Sisodia, Sudip Sharma	July 15, 2023
A couple having sex in a field stumble upon a body next to a car. The body is found to be Tejinder "Paul" Singh, an NRI from the United Kingdom, who is in India to be wedded in an arranged marriage to Veera Soni. His best friend, Liam Murphy, who was with him the previous night is missing. SI Balbir Singh and his asst. Garundi are assigned the case. The car seems to have visible damage to one side and they find out that Paul was involved in an accident with a truck. While interrogating Pauls family, Balbir and Garundi find out that there is land dispute between Paul's father, Satwinder "Steve" Dhillon and his uncle Maninder "Manna" Dhillon. Manna's son Happy is seen to be nervous around the policemen. They also come to know that Veera had an obsessive ex boyfriend, Saakar who had trouble with their break-up. Balbir has a contentious relationship with his daughter, Nimrat who blames him for her mother's suicide and herself has left her husband Raman and is living with Balbir with her son, Golu. Garundi lives with his brother Jung and his sister in law Rajji, with whom he is shown to be having sexual relations. Balbir also supports his former informant Nopi's wife, Indira and there seems to be a mutual attraction between the two. He is often seen to be waiting in his jeep outside her house having a drink. Seeing damage on Paul's car, Balbir and Garundi check CCTV footage and see a truck deliberately trying to run Paul off the road. Steve assaults an invasive reporter. A gas station attendant identifies Paul and Liam and lets the officers know that after filling gas he directed Paul and Liam, looking for booze and drugs, to the nearest village liquor store. Liam's mother, Clara arrives for the wedding.
2	"Episode 2"	Randeep Jha	Gunjit Chopra, Diggi Sisodia, Sudip Sharma	July 15, 2023
A flashback shows Steve assaulting Paul at Liam's house after he cuts his hair as Liam watches and Clara threatens to call the police on Steve. Truck driver Shinda and his cleaner Toti seem to have a secret. Garundi leans on the liquor shop owner and finds out that Paul and Liam were directed to the local drug dealer, Kulli. The coroner, Dr Johal, tells Balbir and Garundi that Paul's throat was slashed but cause of death was blunt force trauma and he also had a cut on his arm from the same weapon used to cut his throat but the wound was made hours earlier. In addition, he informs that someone fellated Paul a few hours before. Truck driver Pramod is seen to blackmail Happy. Balbir and Garundi trace the bus involved in Paul's accident and find that the driver was Pramod who gives them the slip. Paul's missing smartwatch is activated and it leads the cops to drug supplier Ahuja who tells them that he got it from a pizza delivery driver wearing a yellow T shirt which the cops discover to be Kulli. Garundi retrieves footage from Chaska bar where Paul and Liam were seen to have drinks that last night. Dr Johal calls Balbir to tell him that the saliva on Paul's penis is a match for Veera which breaks her alibi.
3	"Episode 3"	Randeep Jha	Gunjit Chopra, Diggi Sisodia, Sudip Sharma	July 15, 2023
A flashback shows Balbir and his wife Taran in a domestic altercation as a young Nimrat watches. A fed up Taran leaves Balbir and tells him that this time she will not be back. Balbir and PC Satnam interrogate Veera about her movements that night. Garundi is on Pramod's trail but he gives him the slip again. Shinda wakes up from his nap at the truck stop to find Toti gone. Pramod asks Happy for money threatening to tell the police that Happy had hired him to run Paul off the road. Kulli is found recovering from an overdose in the hospital. Garundi connects with his fiance, Silky. Rajji is not happy with Garundi's marriage plans. Shinda finds Toti in a bus depot. Checking the video from Chaska Bar, the cops see Saakar getting into a fight with Paul and Liam and Paul getting the wound on his arm.Saakar is arrested.
4	"Episode 4"	Randeep Jha	Gunjit Chopra, Diggi Sisodia, Sudip Sharma	July 15, 2023
A flashback shows Manna praising Paul while he criticises Happy in front of Liam. The cops take Saakar into custody. On pretext of a flat tire, Shinda tries to kill Toti who escapes. Happy tries to threaten Pramod who beats hims up and then doubles his blackmail ask while taking Happy's gun. Balbir goes to meet Nimrat's ex flame, Karan Gill and asks him to leave her alone. Manna comes home to find Happy beaten up. Kulli comes out of his overdose state to tell the cops what happened that night. When Paul and Liam rejected his heroin offer because they wanted cocaine, an angry Kulli starts to chase them but falls behind. When he catches up he find Paul lying in the field next to his car with his throat slashed. While trying to steal his smartwatch, Paul regains consciousness and a scared Kulli repeatedly hits him with a rock to escape. Toti comes to in a hospital screaming about the white mans blood. The hospital call the police and Toti identifies Liam as the white man. Balbir almost gets intimate with Indira but they are interrupted by Nopi's mother. Garundi has a heart to heart with his brother and sister-in-law about his upcoming wedding. Pressured by his superior to charge Kulli with murder, Balbir leaks the post mortem report to a reporter. Garundi tries to locate Shinda.
5	"Episode 5"	Randeep Jha	Gunjit Chopra, Diggi Sisodia, Sudip Sharma	July 15, 2023
A flashback shows Balbir picking up Nopi from his gym and shooting him dead in a desolate area. Balbir tries to interrogate Happy about Pramod but Manna interrupts them. When Manna asks Happy why he tried to hurt Paul, Happy expressed his unhappiness at being dismissed by his father in favour of Paul stunning Manna. Balbir finds Karan at his house, locks Nimrat and Golu in their room and beats him up as Nimrat screams. Garundi uses Shinda's favourite hooker to capture him. Shinda tells them that they ran over Liam as he walked out on the road suddenly in bad visibility. Liam's body is retrieved from the well where Shinda dumped it. Manna returns Happy's gun to him and asks him to careful in the future. Balbir goes to Garundi's engagement party with Golu while Nimrat stays home. Garundi tells Balbir that Pramod's beaten up body was found in a canal. Nimrat tries to commit suicide. Balbir confesses to Indira that he killed Nopi because he owed a politician who got him out the case filed by his in-laws after Taran's suicide. Balbir gets a startling update from the Dr Johal who informs him that he found Paul's saliva on Liam's penis. As he is pondering the relevance of this information, he is t-boned by a truck.
6	"Episode 6"	Randeep Jha	Gunjit Chopra, Diggi Sisodia, Sudip Sharma	July 15, 2023
Garundi searches for Balbir whose empty damaged jeep is found. Assuming that Manna has something to do with Balbir's disappearance, he shakes down Happy. Manna calls Garundi and tells him that abducting cops is not his style and hints that only powerful people like builders are capable of this. Garundi figures out that Karan's grandfather, Shamsher is behind the abduction. He traces Balbir to a farmhouse where Shamsher's strongman, Bawana, has held him and after a shootout with Bawana and his gang, manages to free Balbir. Finding Shamsher waiting as they exit the farmhouse, Balbir has a heart to heart with him and they agree to let their children follow their hearts. Balbir informs Steve, Jassi and Clara about Dr Johal's findings which sends Steve into a rage. Clara tells Steve that Paul and Liam loved each other but Paul could never tell Steve because he would have flown into one of his rages. Steve and Jassi are shocked at the news. Saakar is released and he tries to reconnect with Veera who tells him that he needs to move on as she is now engaged to another man now. Balbir gives Karan and Nimrat his blessing. On the way back home. Clara tells Balbir that on the night of the murder Liam left her a voicemail which she got later. After listening to the voice mail, Balbir reconstructs the final moments of Paul and Liam. In the bar the fight with Saakar results in the cut in Paul's arm and Liam picks up Saakar's blade. Paul meets up with Veera after and she fellates him in the car. After dropping her home he meets up with Liam and they find themselves in the field where the two fight. Paul tells Liam he loves him and fellates him but an angry Liam slashes Paul with Saakar's blade. Finding Paul dying from his wound, Liam calls Clara, leaves her a tearful voice message and then walks out on the road in front of Shinda's truck In a post credits scene, Garundi gets married, Raman takes care of Golu as Nimrat unites with Karan. Veera is seen getting ready for her wedding as Saakar comes to grips with his heartbreak. Steve cries bitterly while holding Paul's wedding sherwani. As Balbir watches from his jeep, Indira opens the door to her house and leaves it opens as she walks inside.

=== Season 2 ===
No.	Title	Directed by	Written by	Original release date
1	"The Barn"	Sudip Sharma, Faisal Rahman	Gunjit Chopra, Diggi Sisodia, Sudip Sharma	February 11, 2026
2	"Three's A Crowd"	Sudip Sharma, Faisal Rahman	Gunjit Chopra, Diggi Sisodia, Sudip Sharma	February 11, 2026
3	"The Dead Never Leave"	Sudip Sharma, Faisal Rahman	Gunjit Chopra, Diggi Sisodia, Sudip Sharma	February 11, 2026
4	"Everything Burns"	Sudip Sharma, Faisal Rahman	Gunjit Chopra, Diggi Sisodia, Sudip Sharma	February 11, 2026
5	"Hide And Seek"	Sudip Sharma, Faisal Rahman	Gunjit Chopra, Diggi Sisodia, Sudip Sharma	February 11, 2026
6	"The Chains That Bind Us"	Sudip Sharma, Faisal Rahman	Gunjit Chopra, Diggi Sisodia, Sudip Sharma	February 11, 2026

== Production ==
The series was officially announced in May 2023 by Netflix media press release. The first look poster of lead cast Barun Sobti and Suvinder Vicky was revealed in May 2023.

== Release ==
The first and second season were released on Netflix on 15 July 2023 and 11 February 2026 respectively.

== Reception ==
On the review aggregator website Rotten Tomatoes, Kohhra holds a rating of 100%.

Saibal Chatterjee of NDTV praised the acting performance, screenplay and direction of the show and gave 3.5 stars out of 5. He said: "The series pierces through the haze and darkness that surround a bereaved family as well as the two cops who are charged with getting to the bottom of the truth."

Shubhra Gupta of The Indian Express wrote in her review "In Sudip Sharma's dramatic, masterfully executed drama Kohrra, which is both a murder mystery and a sharp examination of contemporary Punjab and the Punjabi psyche, location and history play significant roles".

Archika Khurana of The Times of India gave 3.5 stars out of 5 and said that "The show provides a clear and conclusive end, leaving the audience satisfied. "

Shilajit Mitra of The Hindu wrote in his review, "Like Memories of Murder, Kohrra opens on a vast, verdant field. A body is discovered by the wayside. We get an exchange between a stunned young boy and a small-town cop. "

Devansh Sharma of Hindustan Times added, "This Netflix slow-burn has a good deal of surprises to offer if you can see past the "kohrra" of its fast-paced trailer and Sudip Sharma's prior work."

== Accolades ==
Year	Award ceremony	Category	Nominee / Work	Result	Ref.
2023	Filmfare OTT Awards	Best Drama Series	Kohrra	Nominated	
2023	Filmfare OTT Awards	Best Director in a Drama Series	Randeep Jha	Nominated	
2023	Filmfare OTT Awards	Best Director in a Drama Series (Critics)	Randeep Jha	Won	
2023	Filmfare OTT Awards	Best Actor in a Drama Series	Survinder Vicky	Won	
2023	Filmfare OTT Awards	Best Supporting Actor in a Drama Series	Barun Sobti	Won	
2023	Filmfare OTT Awards	Best Supporting Actress in a Drama Series	Harleen Sethi	Nominated	
2023	Filmfare OTT Awards	Best Original Story (Series)	Gunjit Chopra, Diggi Sisodia And Sudip Sharma	Won	
2023	Filmfare OTT Awards	Best Original Screenplay (Series)	Gunjit Chopra, Sudip Sharma, And Diggi Sisodia	Won	
2023	Filmfare OTT Awards	Best Cinematographer (Series)	Saurabh Monga	Nominated	
2023	Filmfare OTT Awards	Best Editing (Series)	Sanyukta Kaza	Nominated	
