= Criminal Justice: Adhura Sach =

- Promotional Poster
- Genre: Crime; Legal drama Thriller
- Written by: Bijesh Jayarajan; Iti Agarwal; Pratyush Athavale; Riya Poojary; Siddharth Hirwe
- Directed by: Rohan Sippy
- Starring: Pankaj Tripathi; Shweta Basu Prasad; Purab Kohli; Swastika Mukherjee; Aatm Prakash Mishra
- No. of episodes: 8

Production
- Production companies: BBC Studios India; Applause Entertainment

Original release
- Network: Disney+ Hotstar
- Release: 26 August – 7 October 2022

Related
- Criminal Justice (2019)

Criminal Justice: Adhura Sach is an Indian Hindi-language legal drama television series directed by Rohan Sippy. Starring Pankaj Tripathi, Shweta Basu Prasad, Purab Kohli, Swastika Mukherjee and Adinath Kothare in prominent roles, the storyline follows the murder case of a teenage celebrity. It premiered on 26 August 2022 and is the third installment in Hotstar Specials' anthology courtroom drama, Criminal Justice.

== Synopsis ==
Mukul Ahuja is the spoilt teenage son of Avantika and Arvind Ahuja, and the stepson of Neeraj Ahuja. Neeraj's daughter, Zara Ahuja, is a child star who appears in a teleseries called Bittu. The Ahujas practically live off of the money earned by Zara. A property developer in Madh Island hires Zara to shoot an ad for his upcoming project. The night before the shoot, both Mukul and Zara sneak out of their villa separately and end up in the same party. They have a heated argument in public before leaving the party.

Mukul returns home, but Zara does not. Her body is later found drowned in the sea, with acid burns on her face. All circumstantial evidence points to Mukul, leading to his arrest and placement in an observation home for juveniles. Prosecutor Lekha is appointed to represent the State of Maharashtra and is almost prejudiced in her determination to convict Mukul. Meanwhile, Zara's parents hire Madhav Mishra as defense counsel, but Mukul lacks confidence in his lawyer and tries to find his own way out of the situation.

== Cast ==
- Pankaj Tripathi as Advocate Madhav Mishra, Mukul's lawyer
- Shweta Basu Prasad as Prosecutor Lekha Agastya
- Purab Kohli as Neeraj Ahuja, Mukul's step-father
- Swastika Mukherjee as Avantika Ahuja, Mukul's mother
- Aaditya Gupta as Mukul Ahuja, Zara's elder step-brother
- Deshna Dugad as Zara Ahuja, Mukul's younger step-sister
- Gaurav Gera as Arvind Ahuja, Mukul's father
- Khushboo Atre as Ratna Mishra, Madhav's wife
- Adinath Kothare as Inspector Prashant Waghmare
- Kalyanee Mulay as Gauri Karmarkar
- Sushil Kumar as Sachin
- Rushad Rana as Vicky Kumar
- Chandresh Singh
- Ishrat Khan
- Rajesh Khera as Solkar, Lekha's senior
- Upendra Limaye as Superintendent Juvenile justice home
- Aatm Prakash Mishra as Deepu, Madhav's assistant

== Episodes ==
No.	Title	Directed by	Original release date
1	"A Dark Night"	Rohan Sippy	26 August 2022
Mukul Ahuja is the spoilt teenage son of Avantika and Arvind Ahuja, and the stepson of Neeraj Ahuja. Neeraj's daughter, Zara Ahuja, is a child star who appears in a teleseries called Bittu. Mukul is shown to have drugs with his friends and have anger issues due to Zara getting more attention. A property developer in Madh Island hires Zara to shoot an ad for his upcoming project. The night before the shoot, both Mukul and Zara sneak out of their villa separately and end up at the same party. They are seen to have a heated argument in public before leaving the party. Mukul returns home, but Zara does not. The next morning Zara is not found in her bed. Some fisherman pull out a body, wrapped in a blue tarp, from the sea which turns out to be Zara.
2	"Web of Lies"	Rohan Sippy	26 August 2022
Post mortem results show Zara's face to have been disfigured with acid causing her death. Zara's death sets off a news and social media frenzy. Under interrogation, Mukul tells the police that he and his sister ended up at the same party where he found Zara drunk and high. He dragged her home and had to stop on the way when Zara threw up in the car, to clean it at the abandoned construction site near the beach. Zara refused to come back home and Mukul thinking she could make the short distance back on foot left her on the beach. Waghmare finds a crime scene inside the construction site with blood and a jerrycan of acid. All the forensic evidence seems to point to Mukul. His DNA is at the crime scene and his fingerprints on the can of acid. Based on CCTV footage and witness statements, the police arrest Mukul for the murder and send him to juvenile detention. Desperate to find a lawyer, Avantika lands up at Madhav Mishra's doorstep.
3	"Bail Denied"	Rohan Sippy	2 September 2022
Madhav appeals for bail stating that this is Mukuls first offence. Lekha shows a video where Mukul is shown brutally attacking a classmate at school and successfully has his bail denied. Madhav gets permission for Mukul to attend Zara's funeral where Neeraj gives Mukul the cold shoulder. Mukul struggles at the juvenile home and the inmate gang led by Rocky beat him up and toss him in the water tank. Mukul is rescued by another inmate.
4	"Section 15"	Rohan Sippy	9 September 2022
Using the media frenzy to exploit public sentiment, Lekha wants to invoke Section 15 and prosecute Mukul as an adult. Madhav and Deepu visit the crime scene where Deepu has doubts about the way things seem to have transpired. Gauri pursues Moti, the spot boy who had an unhealthy obsession with Zara only to find his alibi backed by Vicky Kumar. Mukul is evaluated by a psychiatrist in order to determine his suitability to be tried as an adult. He sneaks into office of the juvie home's warden to research ways to fool the psych eval but is seen by Rocky. Based on Rocky's tip, the police produce the search history in court. This leads the court to decide against Mukul and allows him to be prosecuted as an adult. Avantika finds a dictaphone in Mukul's closet where she finds a recording of Mukul expressing his hate for Zara and his desire to kill her.
5	"Confirmation Bias"	Rohan Sippy	16 September 2022
Madhav meets with Mukul's therapist to get an insight into his mental state. In court he tries to prove that the police were suffering from confirmation bias when they locked on to Mukul as the killer and did not look for any other suspects.
6	"The Breaking Point"	Rohan Sippy	23 September 2022
Mukul and two other inmates plan to break out of the home during the wardens birthday party.
7	"Digging Deeper"	Rohan Sippy	30 September 2022
Madhav and Deepu look for other suspects with motives to murder Zara. They meet with the property developer and Madhav notices that his manager, Awasthi seems to have respiratory issues. Madhav also learns that Awasthi's daughter committed suicide by consuming acid. Madhav sends his wife to get inside Awasthi's home and talk to his wife, where she learns that her daughter was cyberbullied after Zara made a humiliating remark on her Bittu impression video.
8	"Nothing but the Truth"	Rohan Sippy	7 October 2022
Using expert testimony to prove that exposure to acid fumes causes respiratory issues, Madhav calls Awasthi as his final witness.

== Release ==
On 10 August 2022, Disney+ Hotstar released the trailer and announced the release date. The series premiered on Disney+ Hotstar on 26 August 2022 and concluded on 7 October 2022.

== Reception ==
The series received mixed to positive reviews from critics. Subhash K. Jha, reviewing on Firstpost, praised the "storytelling structure, giving to each episode a kind of free-flowing momentum that doesn’t seem artificial or simulated" and added that the "new season manages to go beyond the other two seasons in the pursuit of an engaging thriller perched on the legal theme." Agnivo Niyogi of The Telegraph praised the screenplay and acting performances, calling the series "an instant hit". Nandini Ramnath wrote on Scroll.in that Pankaj Tripathi "hugely boosts the new edition, even if he can’t quite rescue it entirely."

Archika Khurana of The Times of India gave the series three stars out of five, calling it an "engaging legal drama with emotionally dragging scenes", which is "overly stretched before the actual action and courtroom drama begins." Srijita Sen of News18 opined that important topics like trial by media, juvenile justice system, substance abuse and mental health issues in adolescents remained underexplored due to "unnecessary, slow-paced drama". Abhimanyu Mathur of Hindustan Times was critical of the storyline for sidetracking from the show's original theme of portraying "the shortcomings of India’s legal systems" and labelled it a "run-of-the-mill murder mystery".
