= Kathal (film) =

2023 Netflix social comedy drama film

- Official release poster
- Directed by: Yashowardhan Mishra
- Written by: Ashok Mishra; Yashowardhan Mishra
- Produced by: Shobha Kapoor; Ekta Kapoor; Guneet Monga; Achin Jain
- Starring: Sanya Malhotra; Anant V Joshi; Vijay Raaz; Rajpal Yadav; Brijendra Kala; Neha Saraf
- Cinematography: Harshvir Oberai
- Edited by: Prerna Saigal
- Music by: Ram Sampath
- Production companies: Balaji Motion Pictures; Sikhya Entertainment
- Distributed by: Netflix
- Release date: 19 May 2023
- Running time: 115 minutes
- Country: India
- Language: Hindi

Kathal - A Jackfruit Mystery also known as Kathal (transl. Jackfruit) is a 2023 Indian Hindi-language social-satirical comedy thriller film written by Ashok Mishra and directed by Yashowardhan Mishra for Netflix. The film is produced by Shobha Kapoor, Ekta Kapoor, Guneet Monga and Achin Jain under the banners Balaji Motion Pictures and Sikhya Entertainment. The film features Sanya Malhotra, Anant V Joshi, Vijay Raaz, Rajpal Yadav, Brijendra Kala, Neha Saraf and Raghubir Yadav in prominent roles. The film released on 19 May 2023 via Netflix. The film revolves around two Uncle Hong jackfruits (kathal) which get stolen from the garden local MLA Munnalal Pateria, and a police team is assigned to investigate, headed by Inspector Mahima Basor.

At the 71st National Film Awards, Kathal - A Jackfruit Mystery won Best Hindi Feature Film.

== Plot ==
The film begins with local goon Veer Singh 'Veeru' being arrested during an undercover operation led by Inspector Mahima Basore (Sanya Malhotra). At a press conference, SP Angrez Singh Randhawa announces the arrest without acknowledging Mahima's role. Her beau, Constable Saurabh, points this out, but she dismisses it.

Two exotic-breed kathals (jackfruits) disappear from a tree in the garden of MLA Pateria in Moba. Mahima is assigned the case, and despite its trivial nature, the entire police unit is pressured to recover the fruit before it ripens. During the investigation, Mahima faces passive caste-based discrimination from her subordinates, including Saurabh's father. Randhawa promises to promote her to DSP if she solves the case, but she asks him to promote Saurabh instead, which would reduce the hierarchy between them.

After questioning the MLA's family and servants, Mahima identifies the recently dismissed gardener, Birwa, as the main suspect. While searching for him, she discovers that Birwa had repeatedly tried to report his daughter Amiya missing but was turned away by constables, including Saurabh. Mahima is angered by this neglect, but Randhawa pressures her to present Birwa as the thief at a press conference.

Instead, Mahima announces that Birwa's daughter Amiya stole the jackfruits, effectively turning the investigation into a missing-person case so that the police can urgently search for her. At Birwa's village, Mahima learns that Amiya was probably kidnapped by three thugs travelling in a pink Nano, which had been stolen from her subordinate Mishra. Meanwhile, journalist Anuj discovers that Birwa falsely confessed to his daughter's involvement under police pressure. Mahima gives him a file containing details of 43 teenage girls who disappeared from Moba and were never found, persuading him not to publish Birwa's confession.

Using intelligence gathered by Saurabh, Mahima and her team pursue the kidnappers to Chhatarpur, Madhya Pradesh, where they find Amiya about to be trafficked to local businessman Gulab Seth. After a comic confrontation, they arrest the traffickers and rescue her.

In court, Amiya pleads not guilty, while Birwa testifies that she had nothing to do with the stolen jackfruits and that Mahima persuaded him to accuse her at the press conference. The prosecution is outraged, but Mahima explains the absurdity of an entire police force mobilising to recover stolen jackfruits while neglecting a missing girl. The judge acquits Amiya for lack of evidence and commends Mahima for her dedication. As promised, Randhawa promotes Saurabh to Sub-Inspector, while Mahima is promoted to DSP and appointed to lead a special cell combating human trafficking.

In the end, Amiya is reunited with her friends, and it is revealed that a group of monkeys had actually stolen the jackfruits.

== Cast ==
- Sanya Malhotra as DSP Mahima Basore
- Anant V Joshi as Sub Inspector Saurabh Dwivedi
- Gurpal Singh as SP Angrez Singh Randhawa
- Neha Saraf as Kunti Parihar
- Sanjay Dadhich as Advocate Sunil Parihar, Kunti's husband
- Vijay Raaz as MLA Munnalal Pateria
- Namrata Dhamija as Bindeshwari Pateria
- Rajpal Yadav as News reporter Anuj Sanghvi
- Raghubir Yadav as Gulab Seth
- Govind Pandey as Constable Mishra
- Brijendra Kala as Srivastava
- Apoorva Chaturvedi as Amiya
- Megha Shukla as Pinky
- Dherendra Kumar Tiwari as Sanjay Singh
- Ravi Jhankal as Chandulal
- Ekta Singh as Amun's wife
- Lucky Khan as Balbir Bundela Inspector
- Aaradhya Tiwari as Village Girl

== Production ==
=== Development ===
The film was officially announced in March 2022. While preparing for her role, actress Sanya Malhotra who plays a police inspector in the film, had a "macho" or masculine image in mind, but later when she met actual female police personnel, she realised that the character could be feminine as well, wearing nose-in, earing and even make up; kind and gentle instead of cursing profusely. Actors especially Sanya Malhotra worked with dialect coach Suraj Naggar to learn the Bundelkhandi accent of Hindi for the film.

=== Filming ===
The film was mainly shot in the village San Khini in Bhitarwar tehsil of Gwalior district in Madhya Pradesh. Later, some scenes were shot in Gohad in Bhind district of the state. The film wrapped up shooting in May 2022.

== Themes and allusions ==
Kathal addresses multiple intertwined social issues through its satirical crime story. A primary focus is caste discrimination: the film's heroine, Inspector Mahima Basor, is a Dalit (lower‐caste) police officer. This portrayal of a Basor Dalit as a dynamic and intelligent middle-class professional is seen by some critics as a marker for "the rise of the new Dalit protagonist". However, she still encounters everyday caste bias while she is involved in an inter-Caste relationship with an upper caste constable. For example, colleagues make casteist jokes at her expense, and the police initially ignore a farmer's missing daughter, also a Dalit. Critics note that Kathal deliberately "weave[s] ... social issues into the narrative, especially the prevalent ... caste biases," and that it provides comic yet critical commentary on "caste-based hierarchies" in small-town India. Another critic, pointed out that Basor underplays the slurs against her "lower" caste and nevertheless uses her new authority to do "righteous acts with humility," highlighting a rupture in Hindi cinema's portrayal of Dalit characters The Hindustan Times similarly observed that Kathal "highlights the pertinent issues of caste bias and power play" that often shape police investigations in rural areas. Further, it illustrates how entrenched hierarchies of caste influence both Mahima's personal life and her work.

Another key theme is gender and patriarchy. Mahima is one of the few women in her police station and must navigate sexist attitudes as well as caste prejudice. The film showed a female constable (Kunti) being dominated by her lawyer husband despite her professional success. Mahima herself is a senior officer in love with a subordinate male colleague, a situation that flouts both gender and caste norms in his family. Mahima "doesn't wear the weight of her caste or gender too heavily" and instead overcomes snide remarks and harassment "with her wit and spunk", thereby depicting that gender inequality experienced by its female characters who continually proving their competence in a patriarchal system.

The film also satirises bureaucracy and political interference. Much of the plot shows police officers burdened with trivial orders from above (the MLA's missing jackfruits) and higher officials passing tasks down to protect their own positions. A gag in the film – that the force follows the "Indian Political Code" rather than the law – underscores this critique of misplaced priorities. Critics highlighted that bureaucratic absurdity is a central target. The film talks about how caste bias and "power play" often determine police work in small-town India, reflecting broader systemic corruption, inefficient bureaucracy and the influence of powerful locals on justice.

== Music ==
Kathal

Soundtrack album by Ram Sampath
- Released: 9 May 2023
- Genre: Feature film soundtrack
- Length: 9:37
- Language: Hindi
- Label: Zee Music Company

Ram Sampath chronology
Raees (2017)	Kathal (2024)	Laapataa Ladies (2024)

Official audio
- Kathal - Full Album on YouTube

The music of the film is composed by Ram Sampath. Lyrics are written by Ashok Mishra.

Track listing
No.	Title	Singer(s)	Length
1.	"Radhe Radhe"	Rituraj Mohanty	2:55
2.	"Nikar Chalo Re"	Sona Mohapatra	3:44
3.	"Lalla Lalli"	Sona Mohapatra, Amjad Bagadwa	2:58
Total length:			9:37

== Release ==
The film was released via Netflix on 19 May 2023.

== Reception ==
=== Critical response ===
Kathal received mixed to positive reviews from critics. On the review aggregator website Rotten Tomatoes, 73% of 11 critics' reviews are positive, with an average rating of 6.3/10.

Overall, Kathal received mixed to positive reviews from critics. Several praised its satirical treatment of social and political issues, while others criticised its tone and execution. News18 called the film "meaty and layered," commending its seamless blend of socio-political commentary with humour and highlighting Sanya Malhotra's "impressive" performance as Inspector Mahima Basor - "Sanya Malhotra Strikes Gold Again With Her Impressive Act In Heartwarming Film". NewsBytes praised the "strong writing" and effective humour that conveyed caste and gender themes without becoming preachy. Outlook India, described it as a "brilliant satire on the misuse of power by local politicians," while The Federal lauded its "intelligent, deadpan humour" and reaffirmed Malhotra's reputation as an accomplished actor. National Film Award jury member Ashutosh Gowariker commended how the film "peels back the absurd layers of bureaucracy and politics".

== Awards ==
At the 71st National Film Awards the film won the award for Best Hindi Feature Film.
