= Cinema Marte Dum Tak =

Indian reality documentary series

- Genre: Documentary
- Directed by: Vasan Bala; Xulfee; Kulish Kant Thakur
- Starring: Vinod Talwar; Jaspal Neelam; Dilip Gulati; Kishan Shah
- Music by: Nitish Rambhadran; Karan Malhotra
- Country of origin: India
- Original language: Hindi
- No. of seasons: 1
- No. of episodes: 6

Production
- Producer: Ashwin Rai Shetty
- Cinematography: Sukesh Viswanath
- Running time: 30-40 minutes

Original release
- Release: 20 January 2023

Cinema Marte Dum Tak is a 2023 Indian docuseries produced by Vice Studios and created by filmmaker Vasan Bala and co-directed by Disha Rindani, Xulfee, and Kulish Kant Thakur. The series features four directors — J Neelam, Vinod Talwar, Dilip Gulati, and Kishan Shah — who have had success in the 90s. Tasked with utilizing their signature techniques, they are given a limited budget to direct a short movie with their original crew and cast.

The series premiered on Amazon Prime Video on January 20, 2023, and features actors such as Raza Murad, Mukesh Rishi, Harish Patel and Rakhi Sawant. Bollywood actor Arjun Kapoor had appeared as the host of the final episode.

== Overview ==
Created by Vasan Bala, Samira Kanwar and Niharika Kotwal, the show gives an insightful look into the subculture, featuring interviews with the directors, artists and actors of the time such as Kanti Shah, Harish Patel, Raza Murad, Mukesh Rishi and Kiran Kumar.

== Reception ==
Raja Sen of Mint in his review stated "The series works because of the filmmakers in focus. J Neelam, one of the only women directors who made “fultoo sex” pictures like Kunwari Dulhan, approaches her work with pragmatism and sensitivity: she wants scenes to have a point, women to be in charge."

The Indian Express called it "An ode to the world of sleaze and spook"

Ronak Kotecha of The Times of India gave Cinema Marte Dum Tak a 3.5/5 rating, praising Vasan Bala's direction. He noted "Filmmaker Vasan Bala’s passion for cinema is well known and extremely palpable in all his works. ‘Cinema Marte Dum Tak’ is no different."

Shubham Kulkarni from Koimoi gave a rating of 4/5 and wrote "Cinema Marte Dum Tak is a very personal project that is an ode to the stars that were never called one. Watch it for all the hardwork, truth, and the respect it is made with, you will only learn something new."

Deepa Gahlot at Rediff.com rated the series 3 stars out of 5 and wrote "The series is a celebration of those directors' resourcefulness, economy and speed of film-making. Still what remains in the mind long after the six-episodes are done is the much-admired Kanti Shah saying that he often goes out to have a drink just to have someone to talk to."

Suchin Mehrotra in his review stated "Cinema Marte Dum Tak is a gloriously entertaining and charmingly heartfelt"

Kartik Bhardwaj of Cine Express rated the series 3.5/5 stating "Cinema Marte Dum Tak also zooms out and tracks the journey of this underground cinema, and how the controversy around “bits” or pornographic scenes that were added under the nose of the Censors, the death of single screens after advancement of multiplexes and lack of upgradation by makers, led to its downfall."

== Episodes ==
=== Season 1 ===
No.	Title	Directed by	Original release date
1	"Seene mein cinema"	Vasan Bala, Xulfee, Kulish Kant Thakur	20 January 2023
Reunite with Kishen, Dilip, Neelam and Vinod as they seek to relive and restore the once-famous 'Pulp' film industry of the '90s.
2	"Doosri cheekh"	Vasan Bala, Xulfee, Kulish Kant Thakur	20 January 2023
The filmmakers sought a heroine who was willing to take on daring roles, which is a key element of any pulp film.
3	"Haath ki safai"	Vasan Bala, Xulfee, Kulish Kant Thakur	20 January 2023
Four directors arrive on set, ready to start their low-budget films, when Kanti Shah - King of Cult Cinema - arrives to share the secret history of pulp cinema. Lights, Camera, Action!
4	"Ganda tha par dhandha tha"	Vasan Bala, Xulfee, Kulish Kant Thakur	20 January 2023
The cameras continue to roll and the story continues to unfold - with each shoot concluding, we uncover the gritty and mysterious secrets of the pulp movie industry.
5	"The last of us"	Vasan Bala, Xulfee, Kulish Kant Thakur	20 January 2023
Reflecting on past experiences, the filmmakers look back at their films in the can and sorrowfully consider what might have been. The magic is gone, leaving them to ponder their decisions and contemplate what might have been.
