= Alia Bhatt filmography =

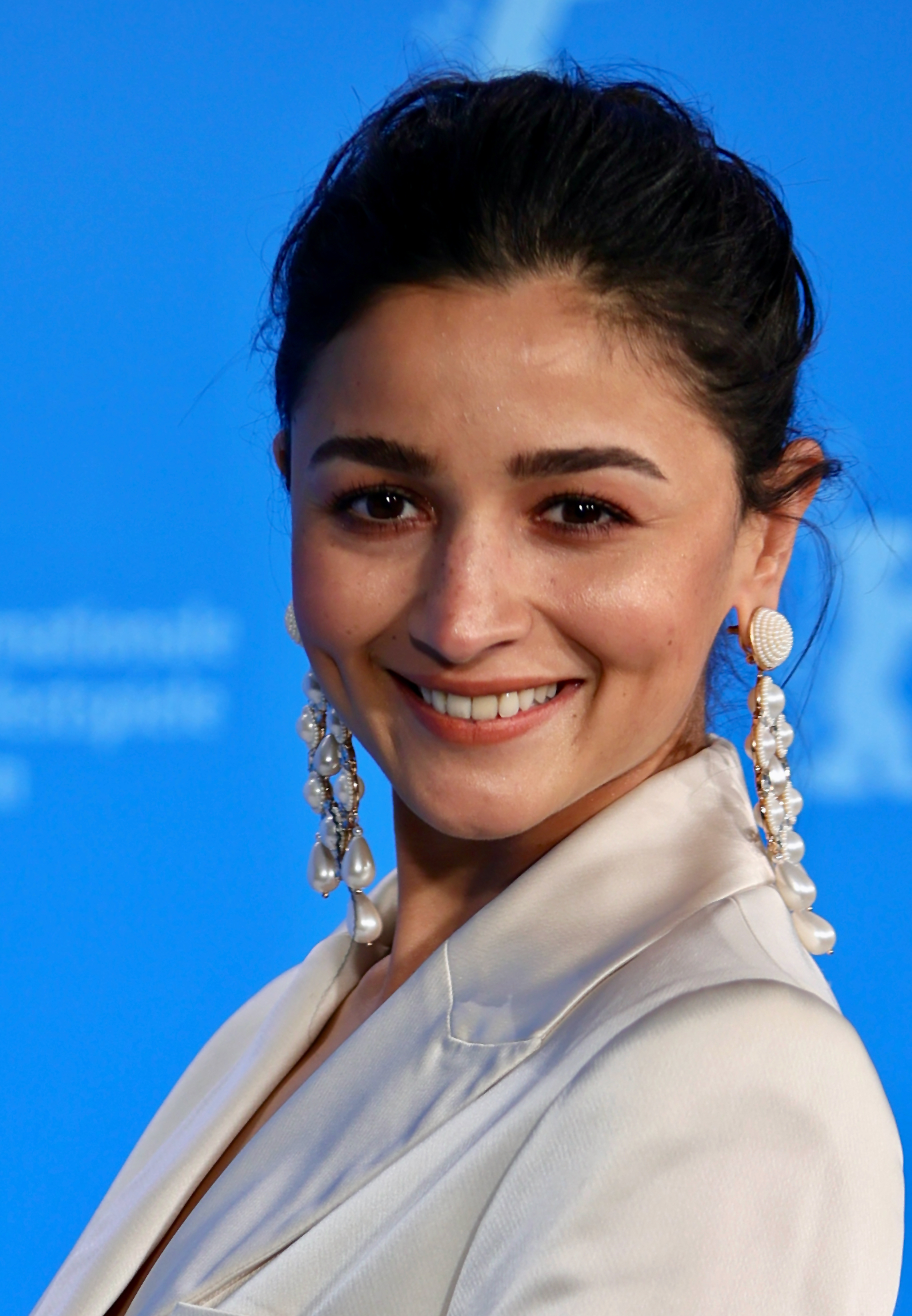
Bhatt at the 2022 Berlinale

Alia Bhatt is a British actress of Indian descent who predominantly works in Hindi films. As a child, she played a minor role in her father Mahesh Bhatt's production Sangharsh (1999), as the younger version of star Preity Zinta's character. In 2012, Bhatt had her first lead role in Karan Johar's teen film Student of the Year, but her performance in it was not well received. Two years later, she gained praise for playing a kidnapping victim in the drama Highway (2014), winning the Filmfare Critics Award for Best Actress. In the same year, her starring roles in the commercially successful romances 2 States and Humpty Sharma Ki Dulhania, both produced under Johar's studio Dharma Productions, established her as a leading actress. She also sang the single "Samjhawan Unplugged" for the latter film's soundtrack.

In Bhatt's three film releases of 2016—Kapoor & Sons, Dear Zindagi, and Udta Punjab—she played young women in troubling circumstances. Her performance in the last of these won her the Filmfare Award for Best Actress. Following another romantic role in Badrinath Ki Dulhania (2017), she played a spy in the thriller Raazi (2018) and a volatile girlfriend in the musical drama Gully Boy (2019). She won two more Best Actress awards at Filmfare for the latter two. This was followed by two poorly received films, Kalank (2019) and Sadak 2 (2020). Bhatt gained further success in 2022 with a brief role in the Telugu period film RRR, and starring roles in the fantasy film Brahmāstra: Part One – Shiva and biopic Gangubai Kathiawadi, in which she starred as the titular prostitute; all three rank among the highest-grossing Indian films of the year. She won the National Film Award for Best Actress and her fourth Best Actress award at Filmfare for the last of these. She also produced and starred in the Netflix black comedy Darlings under her company Eternal Sunshine Productions, for which she received a Filmfare OTT Award.

In 2023, Bhatt starred opposite Ranveer Singh in Johar's romantic comedy Rocky Aur Rani Kii Prem Kahaani, one of the highest-grossing Hindi films of the year, and expanded to American cinema with the Netflix action film Heart of Stone. The former won her a record-tying fifth Best Actress award at Filmfare, followed by a record-setting sixth for her performance in the action thriller Jigra (2024), which she also co-produced. She followed this with another unremarkable action film, Alpha (2026), which was poorly-received.

== Films ==
Key
| † | Denotes films that have not yet been released |

- All films are in Hindi unless otherwise noted.

Films
| Year | Title | Role | Notes | Ref. |
|---|---|---|---|---|
| 1999 | Sangharsh | Young Reet Oberoi | Child artist | |
| 2012 | Student of the Year | Shanaya Singhania | | |
| 2014 | Highway | Veera Tripathi | | |
| 2014 | 2 States | Ananya Swaminathan | | |
| 2014 | Humpty Sharma Ki Dulhania | Kavya Pratap Singh | | |
| 2014 | Ugly | Young Shalini | Cameo appearance | |
| 2015 | Shaandaar | Alia Arora | | |
| 2016 | Kapoor & Sons | Tia Malik | | |
| 2016 | Udta Punjab | Mary Jane | | |
| 2016 | Ae Dil Hai Mushkil | DJ | Cameo appearance | |
| 2016 | Dear Zindagi | Kaira | | |
| 2017 | Badrinath Ki Dulhania | Vaidehi Trivedi | | |
| 2018 | Raazi | Sehmat Khan | | |
| 2018 | Zero | Herself | Cameo appearance | |
| 2019 | Gully Boy | Safeena Firdausi | | |
| 2019 | Kalank | Roop | | |
| 2019 | Student of the Year 2 | Herself | Special appearance in the song "The Hook Up Song" | |
| 2020 | Sadak 2 | Aarya Desai | | |
| 2022 | Gangubai Kathiawadi | Gangubai Kathiawadi | | |
| 2022 | RRR | Sita | Telugu film; Cameo appearance | |
| 2022 | Darlings | Badru Qureshi | Also producer | |
| 2022 | Brahmāstra: Part One – Shiva | Isha Chatterjee | | |
| 2023 | Rocky Aur Rani Kii Prem Kahaani | Rani Chatterjee | | |
| 2023 | Heart of Stone | Keya Dhawan | American film | |
| 2024 | Jigra | Satyabhama Anand | Also producer | |
| 2026 | Alpha | Sita | | |
| 2026 | Don't Be Shy | Herself | Special appearance in the song "Re Bawri"; Also producer | |
| 2027 | Love & War † | TBA | Filming | |
| 2027 | Tumbbad 2 † | TBA | Filming | |

== Short films ==
| Year | Title | Role(s) | Language | Ref. |
|---|---|---|---|---|
| 2014 | Going Home | Herself | Hindi | |

== Television ==
Films
| Year | Title | Role | Notes | Ref. |
|---|---|---|---|---|
| 2023–2024 | Poacher | — | Executive producer; Malayalam series | |
| 2026 | India's Got Latent | Guest judge | Season 2, Episode 1 | |

== Music videos ==
Music videos
| Year | Title | Performers | Ref. |
|---|---|---|---|
| 2019 | "Prada" | The Doorbeen, Shreya Sharma | |
| 2019 | "Smile Deke Dekho" | Amit Trivedi, Sunidhi Chauhan, Nakash Aziz | |
| 2020 | "Kudi Nu Nachne De" | Vishal Dadlani, Sachin–Jigar | |

== Discography ==
Discography
| Year | Track | Album | Ref. |
|---|---|---|---|
| 2014 | "Sooha Saha" | Highway | |
| 2014 | "Samjhawan Unplugged" | Humpty Sharma Ki Dulhania | |
| 2016 | "Ikk Kudi (Club Mix)" | Udta Punjab | |
| 2016 | "Love You Zindagi (Club Mix)" | Dear Zindagi | |
| 2016 | "Ae Zindagi Gale Laga Le – 2" | Dear Zindagi | |
| 2017 | "Humsafar (Alia's version)" | Badrinath Ki Dulhania | |
| 2020 | "Tum Se Hi (Reprise)" | Sadak 2 | |
| 2024 | "Chal Kudiye" | Jigra | |

== See also ==
- List of awards and nominations received by Alia Bhatt
