= List of awards and nominations received by Alia Bhatt =

Alia Bhatt awards and nominations
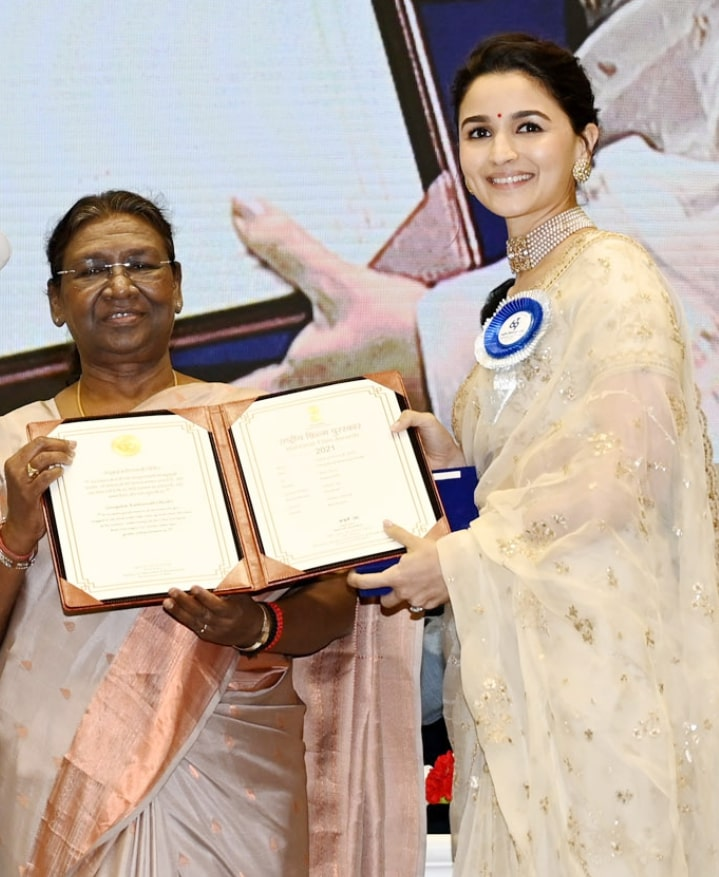
- President of India Droupadi Murmu presenting Bhatt with the National Film Award for Best Actress for Gangubai Kathiawadi
Awards and nominations
Award	Wins	Nominations
National Film Awards	1	–
Filmfare Awards	7	13
Filmfare OTT Awards	1	1
Screen Awards	5	10
Zee Cine Awards	6	11
Hollywood Critics Association Awards	1	–
Stardust Awards	2	6
Star Guild Awards	1	3
IIFA Awards	5	10
Nickelodeon Kids' Choice Awards India	3	4
Mirchi Music Awards	1	1
People's Choice Awards	0	1
Indian Film Festival of Melbourne	0	6
Indian Television Academy Awards	2	–
Lions Gold Awards	1	1
Others	33	–

Totals (Note: Certain award groups do not simply award one winner. They acknowledge several different recipients, have runners-up, and have third place. Since this is a specific recognition and is different from losing an award, runner-up mentions are considered wins in this award tally. For simplification and to avoid errors, each award in this list has been presumed to have had a prior nomination.)
- Wins: 69
- Nominations: 97

Actress Alia Bhatt has received over 60 awards. She is the recipient of a National Film Award for Best Actress for the biographical crime drama Gangubai Kathiawadi (2022), and seven Filmfare Awards: one Best Actress (Critics) for the road drama Highway (2014) and record-setting six Best Actress for the crime drama Udta Punjab (2016), the spy thriller Raazi (2018), the musical drama Gully Boy (2019), Gangubai Kathiawadi (2022), the romantic comedy family drama Rocky Aur Rani Kii Prem Kahaani (2023) and the action thriller Jigra (2024). She is also the recipient of a Filmfare OTT Award for the dark comedy Darlings (2022). Additional Filmfare nominations include three for Best Actress for Highway (2014), the coming-of-age film Dear Zindagi (2016), and the romantic comedy Badrinath Ki Dulhania (2017); two for Best Actress (Critics) for Raazi (2018) and Jigra (2024); and another for Best Female Debut for the romantic comedy-drama Student of the Year (2012).

Bhatt was awarded the Screen Award and IIFA Award for Best Actress for Udta Punjab (2016), and won record four Zee Cine Award for Best Actor – Female for Badrinath Ki Dulhania (2017), Raazi (2018), Gully Boy (2019) and Darlings (2022). For Raazi (2018), she won a second Screen Award and second IIFA Award for Best Actress. She won her third Screen and IIFA Award for Best Actress Gully Boy (2019). For Gangubai Kathiawadi (2022), she won a record-setting fourth IIFA Award for Best Actress, in addition to the Zee Cine Award for Best Actor – Female (Critics). She also won the Best Actress of the Decade award at the Indian Television Academy Awards in 2022. In 2025, the Golden Globes honoured her with the Horizon Award at the Red Sea International Film Festival for her contributions to international cinema.

== Film awards ==
Award	Year	Film	Category	Result	Ref(s)
BIG Star Entertainment Awards	2015	Highway	Most Entertaining Actor in a Social / Drama Film – Female	Nominated	
BIG Star Entertainment Awards	2015	2 States	Most Entertaining Jodi of the Year (Note: Shared with Arjun Kapoor)	Won	
BIG Star Entertainment Awards	2015	2 States	Most Entertaining Actor in a Romantic Film – Female	Won	
BIG Star Entertainment Awards	2015	Humpty Sharma Ki Dulhania	Most Entertaining Actor in a Romantic Film – Female	Nominated	
BIG Star Entertainment Awards	2015	—N/a	Star Plus Entertainer of the Year (Note: Shared with Sidharth Malhotra)	Won	
Bollywood Hungama Style Icons	2023	—N/a	Most Stylish Social Warrior	Nominated	
Bollywood Hungama Style Icons	2023	—N/a	Most Stylish Iconic Performer (Female)	Nominated	
Filmfare Awards	2013	Student of the Year	Best Female Debut	Nominated	
Filmfare Awards	2015	Highway	Best Actress (Critics)	Won	
Filmfare Awards	2015	Highway	Best Actress	Nominated	
Filmfare Awards	2017	Dear Zindagi	Best Actress	Nominated	
Filmfare Awards	2017	Udta Punjab	Best Actress	Won	
Filmfare Awards	2018	Badrinath Ki Dulhania	Best Actress	Nominated	
Filmfare Awards	2019	Raazi	Best Actress	Won	
Filmfare Awards	2019	Raazi	Best Actress (Critics)	Nominated	
Filmfare Awards	2020	Gully Boy	Best Actress	Won	
Filmfare Awards	2023	Gangubai Kathiawadi	Best Actress	Won	
Filmfare Awards	2024	Rocky Aur Rani Kii Prem Kahaani	Best Actress	Won	
Filmfare Awards	2025	Jigra	Best Actress	Won	
Filmfare Awards	2025	Jigra	Best Actress (Critics)	Nominated	
Filmfare OTT Awards	2023	Darlings	Best Actress (Web Original Film)	Won	
Hollywood Critics Association Awards	2023	RRR	Spotlight Award (Note: Shared with cast and crew of RRR)	Won	
Indian Film Festival of Melbourne	2017	Dear Zindagi	Best Actress	Nominated	
Indian Film Festival of Melbourne	2018	Raazi	Best Actress	Nominated	
Indian Film Festival of Melbourne	2019	Gully Boy	Best Actress	Nominated	
Indian Film Festival of Melbourne	2022	Gangubai Kathiawadi	Best Actress	Nominated	
Indian Film Festival of Melbourne	2023	Darlings	Best Actress	Nominated	
Indian Film Festival of Melbourne	2024	Rocky Aur Rani Kii Prem Kahaani	Best Actress	Nominated	
Indian Television Academy Awards	2022	—N/a	Best Actress of the Decade	Won	
Indian Television Academy Awards	2025	—N/a	Global Icon of Indian Cinema	Won	
International Indian Film Academy Awards	2015	2 States	Best Actress in a Leading Role	Nominated	
International Indian Film Academy Awards	2017	Dear Zindagi	Best Actress in a Leading Role	Nominated	
International Indian Film Academy Awards	2017	Udta Punjab	Best Actress in a Leading Role	Won	
International Indian Film Academy Awards	2017	—N/a	Myntra Style Icon Award	Won	
International Indian Film Academy Awards	2018	Badrinath Ki Dulhania	Best Actress in a Leading Role	Nominated	
International Indian Film Academy Awards	2019	Raazi	Best Actress in a Leading Role	Won	
International Indian Film Academy Awards	2020	Gully Boy	Best Actress in a Leading Role	Won	
International Indian Film Academy Awards	2023	Darlings	Best Actress in a Leading Role	Nominated	
International Indian Film Academy Awards	2023	Gangubai Kathiawadi	Best Actress in a Leading Role	Won	
International Indian Film Academy Awards	2024	Rocky Aur Rani Kii Prem Kahaani	Best Actress in a Leading Role	Nominated	
International Indian Film Academy Awards	2025	Jigra	Best Actress in a Leading Role	Nominated	
Lions Gold Awards	2013	Student of the Year	Favorite Debut Actress	Won	
Mirchi Music Awards	2015	—N/a	Royal Stag Make It Large Award	Won	
National Film Awards	2023	Gangubai Kathiawadi	Best Actress (Note: tied with Kriti Sanon for Mimi)	Won	
Nickelodeon Kids' Choice Awards India	2016	—N/a	Jodi Kamaal Ki (shared with Varun Dhawan)	Won	
Nickelodeon Kids' Choice Awards India	2018	Badrinath Ki Dulhania	Best Actor (Female)	Won	
Nickelodeon Kids' Choice Awards India	2019	Raazi	Favourite Movie Actor (Female)	Won	
Nickelodeon Kids' Choice Awards India	2020	Gully Boy	Favorite Movie Actor (Female)	Nominated	
People's Choice Awards	2019	—N/a	The Most Inspiring Asian Woman of 2019	Nominated	
Screen Awards	2013	Student of the Year	Most Promising Newcomer – Female	Nominated	
Screen Awards	2015	Highway	Best Actress	Nominated	
Screen Awards	2015	2 States	Best Actress (Popular Choice)	Nominated	
Screen Awards	2015	—N/a	Life Ok Hero (Female)	Won	
Screen Awards	2017	Dear Zindagi	Best Actress	Nominated	
Screen Awards	2017	Udta Punjab	Best Actress	Won	
Screen Awards	2017	—N/a	Star Plus Ki Nai Soch Award	Won	
Screen Awards	2018	Badrinath Ki Dulhania	Best Actor – Female (Popular)	Nominated	
Screen Awards	2019	Raazi	Best Actress	Won	
Screen Awards	2020	Gully Boy	Best Actress	Won	
Star Guild Awards	2013	Student of the Year	Best Female Debut	Nominated	
Star Guild Awards	2015	Highway	Best Actress in a Leading Role	Nominated	
Star Guild Awards	2015	—N/a	Gionee Most Stylish Youth Icon (Special Award)	Won	
Stardust Awards	2013	Student of the Year	Superstar of Tomorrow – Female	Nominated	
Stardust Awards	2015	Highway	Superstar of Tomorrow – Female	Won	
Stardust Awards	2015	Highway	Best Actress	Nominated	
Stardust Awards	2015	Humpty Sharma Ki Dulhania	Best Actress – Comedy/Romance	Won	
Stardust Awards	2017	Dear Zindagi	Performer of the Year (Female)	Nominated	
Stardust Awards	2017	Udta Punjab	Performer of the Year (Female)	Nominated	
Times of India Film Awards	2013	Student of the Year	Best Female Debut	Nominated	
Zee Cine Awards	2013	Student of the Year	Best Female Debut	Nominated	
Zee Cine Awards	2017	Dear Zindagi	Best Actress	Nominated	
Zee Cine Awards	2017	Udta Punjab	Best Actress	Nominated	
Zee Cine Awards	2017	Udta Punjab	Best Actress (Critics)	Won	
Zee Cine Awards	2018	Badrinath Ki Dulhania	Best Actress (Critics)	Nominated	
Zee Cine Awards	2018	Badrinath Ki Dulhania	Best Actress	Won	
Zee Cine Awards	2019	Raazi	Best Actress	Won	
Zee Cine Awards	2020	Gully Boy	Best Actress	Won	
Zee Cine Awards	2023	Darlings	Best Actress	Won	
Zee Cine Awards	2023	Gangubai Kathiawadi	Best Actress (Critics)	Won	
Zee Cine Awards	2024	Rocky Aur Rani Kii Prem Kahaani	Best Actress	Nominated	

== Other recognition ==
- 2017: Forbes 30 Under 30.
- 2021: PETA India's Person of the Year award for continuous work in support of an animal-friendly fashion industry.
- 2022: Smita Patil Memorial Award for Best Actress for outstanding contribution to Hindi Cinema.
- 2022: Time100 Impact Awards.
- 2022: Forbes India Icon of Excellence.
- 2023: India Business Leader Award (IBLA) for Entertainment Leader of the Year.
- 2023: GQ Men of the Year Award for Outstanding Achievement in the year 2023.
- 2024: Honorary Entertainment Makers Award at the Entertainment Makers Awards (Joy Awards) 2024.
- 2024: Time 100 most influential people in the world.
- 2024: The Business of Fashion BoF 500 Class Of 2024.
- 2025: Horizon Award presented by the Golden Globes at the Red Sea International Film Festival.
