= Alia Bhatt =

British actress (born 1993)

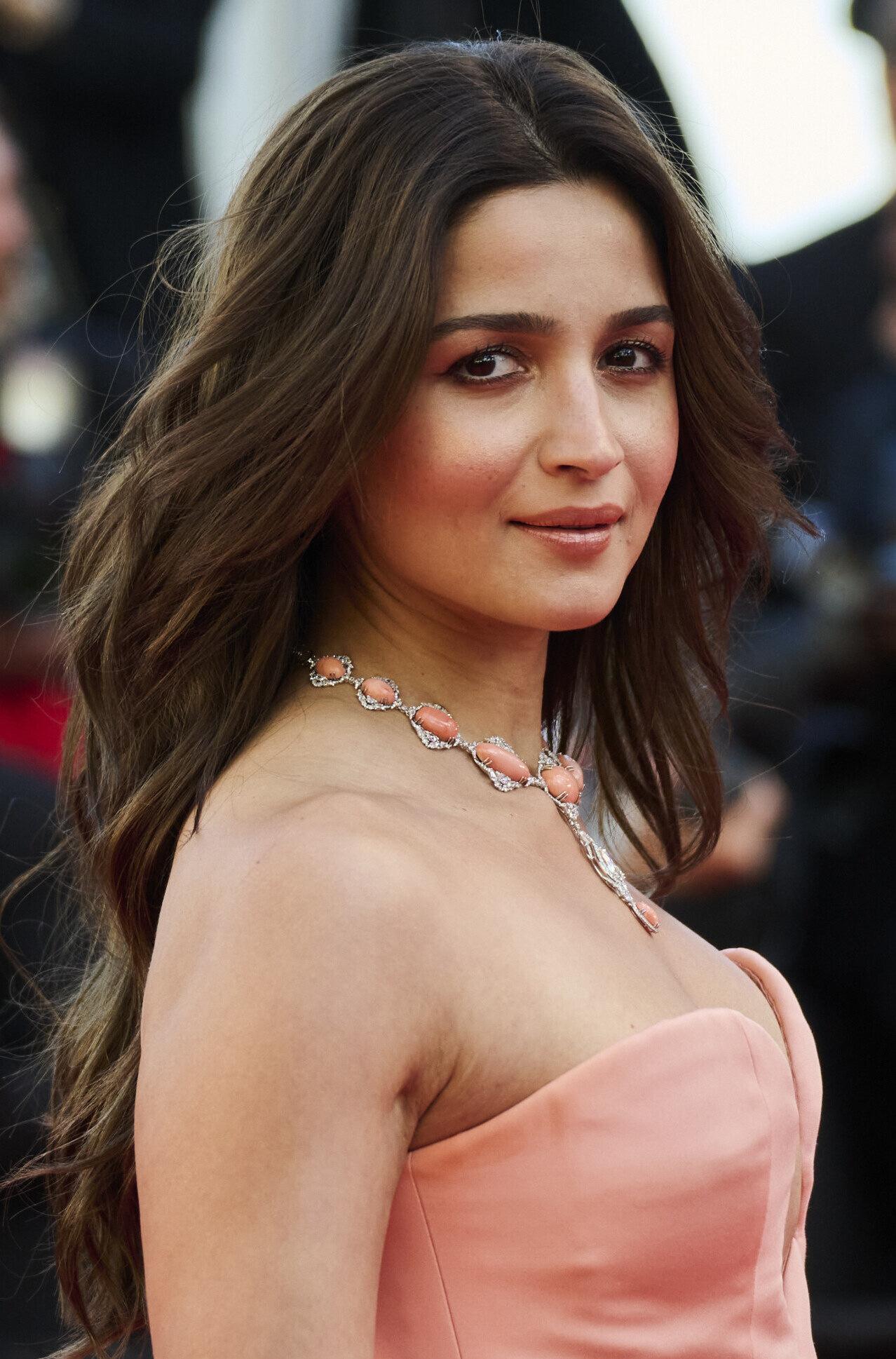
- Bhatt in 2026
- Born: 15 March 1993 (age 33); Bombay, Maharashtra, India
- Citizenship: British
- Occupation: Actress
- Years active: 2012–present
- Works: Full list
- Spouse: Ranbir Kapoor (m. 2022)
- Children: 1
- Parents: Mahesh Bhatt (father); Soni Razdan (mother)
- Relatives: Bhatt family; Kapoor family (by marriage)
- Awards: Full list

Alia Bhatt (/ˈɑːliə ˈbʌt/; born 15 March 1993) is a British actress of Indian descent who predominantly works in Hindi films. Known for her portrayals of women in challenging circumstances, she has received several accolades, including a National Film Award and seven Filmfare Awards. She is one of India's highest-paid actresses. Time awarded her with the Time100 Impact Award in 2022 and named her one of the 100 most influential people in the world in 2024.

Born into the Bhatt family, she is a daughter of filmmaker Mahesh Bhatt and actress Soni Razdan. After making her acting debut as a child in the 1999 thriller film Sangharsh, she played her first leading role in Karan Johar's teen film Student of the Year (2012). She won the Filmfare Critics Award for Best Actress for playing a kidnapping victim in the road drama Highway (2014) and went on to establish herself with starring roles in several romantic films produced by Johar's studio Dharma Productions.

Bhatt won Filmfare Awards for Best Actress for playing a victim of drug abuse in the crime drama Udta Punjab (2016), an undercover spy in the thriller Raazi (2018), a possessive girlfriend in the musical drama Gully Boy (2019), and the title role of a prostitute in the biopic Gangubai Kathiawadi (2022). The last of these also earned her the National Film Award for Best Actress. She expanded to film production with the black comedy Darlings (2022) and had her biggest commercial success in the fantasy film Brahmāstra: Part One – Shiva (2022) and the romantic comedy Rocky Aur Rani Kii Prem Kahaani (2023). The last of these earned her a fifth Best Actress award at Filmfare, followed by a record-setting sixth for her performance in the action thriller Jigra (2024), which she also co-produced.

In addition to acting, Bhatt supports various charities and is an investor and prominent brand endorser. She founded an ecological initiative, CoExist, in 2017, a production company, Eternal Sunshine Productions, in 2019, and a sustainable clothing brand, Ed-a-Mamma, in 2022. Bhatt has sung eight of her film songs, including the single "Samjhawan Unplugged" in 2014. She is married to actor Ranbir Kapoor, with whom she has a daughter, Raha.

== Early life and background ==
Bhatt was born into the Bhatt family on 15 March 1993 in Bombay (now known as Mumbai), Maharashtra, India. She is a daughter of Indian filmmaker Mahesh Bhatt and British actress Soni Razdan. Mahesh is of Gujarati descent, while Soni is of Kashmiri-Pandit and German descent. Bhatt holds British citizenship. She is a granddaughter of producer-director Nanabhai Bhatt and his partner, actress Shirin Mohammad Ali. She has an elder sister, Shaheen, and two half-siblings, Pooja and Rahul Bhatt. Actor Emraan Hashmi and director Mohit Suri are her paternal cousins, while producer Mukesh Bhatt is her uncle. Educated at the Jamnabai Narsee School, she dropped out of twelfth grade to pursue acting.

Describing her childhood, Bhatt said, "I had a rather grounded and modest upbringing. I didn't get the pleasures that people assume I would've got because I am Mahesh Bhatt's daughter." Growing up, she was not close with Mahesh; Soni has said that she raised her children mostly as a single parent as Mahesh did not take much interest in their lives; Bhatt has said that, as a child, she "didn't miss him as such because I did not really have him", adding that they developed a closer bond only when she became an actress.

Bhatt aspired to act from a young age, saying that she first realised her interest while rehearsing for the school choir in kindergarten. She soon began dance lessons at Shiamak Davar's institute. Her first acting role was at the age of five in Mahesh's production venture Sangharsh (1999), in which she briefly played the younger version of Preity Zinta's character. Talking about her experience, Bhatt later remarked that she did not remember much of it. At the age of nine, she auditioned for a role in Sanjay Leela Bhansali's film Black (2005), but did not get the part. Three years later, Bhansali cast Bhatt opposite Ranbir Kapoor, ten years her senior, to make their debuts in the former's film Balika Vadhu, which was shelved.

== Career ==
=== Early work and breakthrough (2012–2015) ===
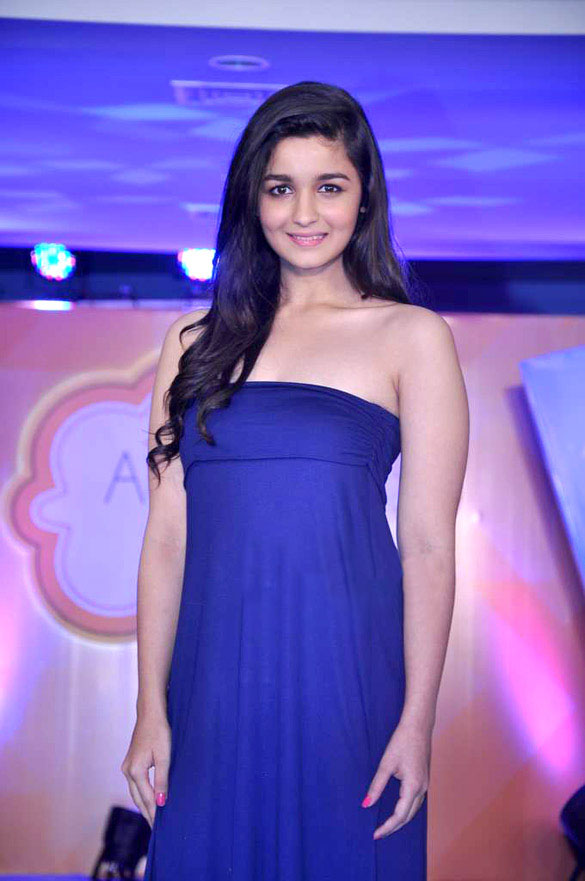
Bhatt in 2013

Bhatt had her first leading role in 2012 with Karan Johar's Student of the Year, alongside newcomers Sidharth Malhotra and Varun Dhawan. She auditioned alongside 500 girls and was cast by Johar on the condition that she lose 16 kg (35 lb), which she did in three months. She played a sophisticated teenage girl involved in a love triangle. Anupama Chopra of Hindustan Times mentioned similarities between her character and Kareena Kapoor's role in Johar's Kabhi Khushi Kabhie Gham (2001), but noted that her performance was "without the killer attitude." Lisa Tsering of The Hollywood Reporter dismissed her as "a washout," finding her "inelegant in the dance numbers" and her "expressions [to be] limited." The film grossed ₹960 million (US$10 million) at the box office, becoming a commercial success.

Dismayed by the critical response to Student of the Year, Bhatt was keen to play a challenging role. She found it in Imtiaz Ali's coming-of-age film Highway (2014), in which she starred as a young woman from a wealthy family who, after being abducted, develops Stockholm syndrome towards her captor (played by Randeep Hooda). She took diction lessons to improve her Hindi, and was challenged by the emotional and physical requirements of the part. Ali shot the film sequentially and several scenes were improvised on set based on Bhatt's reactions. She said that several aspects of her character's journey mirrored her own, as it was the first time she experienced situations that were different from her own privileged upbringing. Ronnie Scheib of Variety took note of her "endearingly cockeyed perf" and commended her for "bringing an underlying sadness and wistful intelligence" to her part. The film underperformed at the box office, though Bhatt won the Filmfare Critics Award for Best Actress and also gained a Best Actress nomination at the ceremony. Also that year, she led Going Home, a short film directed by Vikas Bahl for Vogue India to promote women's safety.

Continuing her collaboration with Johar's company, Dharma Productions, Bhatt starred in the romantic films 2 States and Humpty Sharma Ki Dulhania (both 2014). The former was an adaptation of Chetan Bhagat's novel of the same name, and is about two management students who have trouble convincing their parents of their relationship. For her role as a headstrong Tamil girl, she learnt to speak her lines in Tamil with help from a tutor. Shubhra Gupta of The Indian Express was appreciative of Bhatt, labelling her "easy and fresh and natural.” She played a girl who has an affair before her wedding, in Humpty Sharma Ki Dulhania, directed by Shashank Khaitan. It was described as a tribute to Dilwale Dulhania Le Jayenge (1995) by Johar. Writing for India Today, Rohit Khilnani thought that Bhatt had pitched in "one of her best performances so far,” though Nandini Ramnath of Mint found her lacking in subtlety, writing that she was "more comfortable acting out her feelings through dialogue and actions.” Both films were commercially successful, each earning over ₹1 billion (US$11 million) worldwide. The box-office performances of her films in 2014 established her career.

Bhatt reunited with Bahl for the romantic comedy Shaandaar. Released in 2015, the film features Shahid Kapoor and Bhatt as insomniacs who fall in love during a destination wedding. Kunal Guha of Mumbai Mirror criticised the film and wrote that Bhatt "socks life into her character but fails to pump any into this film.” The film did not perform well commercially.

=== Established actress (2016–2021) ===
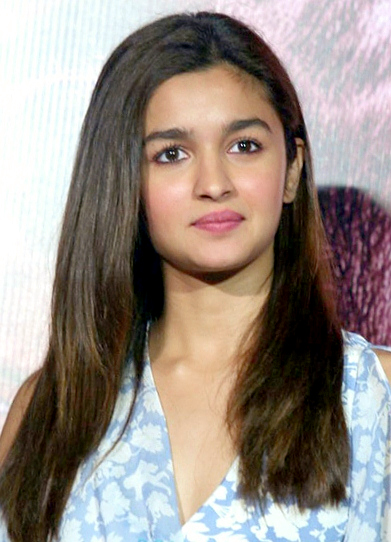
Bhatt at an event for Udta Punjab in 2016

Bhatt began 2016 with a supporting role in Shakun Batra's ensemble drama Kapoor & Sons, starring alongside Malhotra and Fawad Khan, which was a critical and commercial success. She next took on the part of a poor Bihari migrant in Udta Punjab (2016), a crime drama about substance abuse from writer-director Abhishek Chaubey. The intense role marked a departure from the mostly light-hearted parts she had played before, and in preparation, she watched documentaries on drug abuse and learned to speak a Bihari dialect. The film's depiction of drug use generated controversy and censorship in India. Bhatt's performance was critically acclaimed. Raja Sen of Rediff.com wrote that she "commits to her accent and deals with the film's most unsavoury section, and is stunning during an incendiary speech that elevates the entire film to a whole other level." She next played a troubled young woman who consults with a therapist (played by Shah Rukh Khan) in Gauri Shinde's coming-of-age film Dear Zindagi (2016). Writing for IndieWire, Anisha Jhaveri commended her for providing millennial angst with "a three-dimensionality.” Udta Punjab and Dear Zindagi gained Bhatt awards attention; for the former, she won the Screen Award and the Filmfare Award for Best Actress, and for the latter, she received an additional Best Actress nomination at Filmfare.

The series of successful films continued with her next project, the romantic comedy Badrinath Ki Dulhania (2017), in which she reunited with Khaitan and Dhawan. It tells the story of an independent young woman (Bhatt) who refuses to conform to patriarchal expectations from her chauvinistic fiancée (Dhawan). Rachel Saltz of The New York Times took note of the film's statement on gender equality and wrote, "Without ever falling into the clichés of spunky Bollywood heroine, [Bhatt] effortlessly embodies that admirable thing: a modern woman." She received another Filmfare nomination for Best Actress. Meghna Gulzar's espionage thriller Raazi (2018) starred Bhatt as Sehmat Khan, a Kashmiri spy married to a Pakistani army officer (played by Vicky Kaushal). Set during the Indo-Pakistani War of 1971, the film is an adaptation of Harinder Sikka's novel Calling Sehmat. The film was shot entirely in a span of 48 days and Bhatt found herself emotionally drained by the experience. Anna M. M. Vetticad of Firstpost wrote that she displayed "the maturity and confidence of a veteran on camera.” Writing for the journal Film Quarterly, Bilal Qureshi believed that her performance captured the film's humanist themes. Raazi proved to be one of the highest-grossing female-led Hindi films, and its success led Box Office India to credit Bhatt as the most successful contemporary actress of Hindi cinema. She won another Best Actress award at Filmfare.

Bhatt launched her own production company named Eternal Sunshine Productions in early 2019. Her first appearance that year was opposite Ranveer Singh in Zoya Akhtar's Gully Boy, a musical inspired by the life of the street rappers Divine and Naezy. She attended acting workshops to learn Bambaiya Hindi to enable her to improvise on set. The film premiered at the 69th Berlin International Film Festival. Writing for Screen International, Lee Marshall opined that "Bhatt's sharp performance carries most successfully the mix of wry humour, romance and social comment that Gully Boy essays.” With global earnings of over ₹2.37 billion (US$25 million), the film emerged as Bhatt's highest-grossing release to that point. Gully Boy won a record 13 Filmfare Awards, and Bhatt was awarded with her career's third Best Actress trophy.

The ensemble period drama Kalank (2019) marked Bhatt's biggest-budget film to that point. Set in the 1940s prior to the partition of India, it featured Dhawan and her as star-crossed lovers. She watched the films Mughal-e-Azam (1960) and Umrao Jaan (1981) to learn the body language of women from the era; to better her Urdu-speaking skills, she watched the Pakistani television series Zindagi Gulzar Hai. Shubhra Gupta bemoaned that she was "watchable, if increasingly, exasperatingly familiar.” The film did not perform well at the box office. Bhatt next starred in Sadak 2 (2020), a sequel to her father's crime film Sadak (1991), which, due to the COVID-19 pandemic in India, could not be released theatrically and instead streamed on Disney+ Hotstar. The death of Sushant Singh Rajput sparked a debate on nepotism in the Hindi film industry; his fans blamed Bhatt for being one of the beneficiaries of nepotism and for once speaking dismissively of Rajput on Johar's chat show Koffee with Karan. This led to vote brigading on the film's trailer on YouTube, on which it became the second most-disliked video to that point. The film received negative reviews, and Pallabi Dey Purkayastha of The Times of India dismissed Bhatt's performance "by her own high standards" to be "strictly average.”

=== Career progression (2022–present) ===
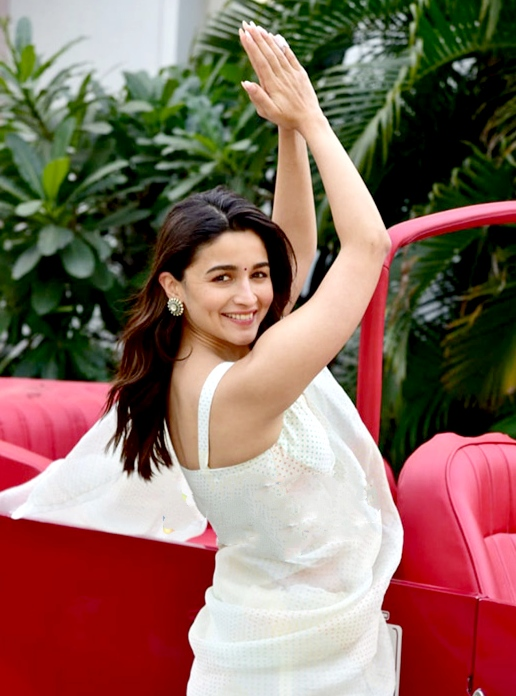
Bhatt promoting Gangubai Kathiawadi (2022), for which she won the National Film Award for Best Actress

Bhatt gained further success in 2022. She portrayed the title role of a prostitute in Sanjay Leela Bhansali's biopic Gangubai Kathiawadi (2022), which premiered at the 72nd Berlin International Film Festival. In preparation, she studied the work of actress Meena Kumari, and watched films such as Mandi (1983) and Memoirs of a Geisha (2005). Commenting on media speculation that Bhatt had been miscast in such an assertive part, Saibal Chatterjee of NDTV opined that "the actress puts all doubts to rest with a marvellously lively performance". Additionally, Stutee Ghosh of The Quint commended her for playing the part with a "rare mix of innocence and jaw clenching seething anger.” It emerged as her third release to gross over ₹2 billion (US$21 million) worldwide. The Guardian featured her portrayal in their listing of the best big-screen performances of all time, and she was awarded with her fourth Best Actress award at Filmfare in addition to the National Film Award for Best Actress (shared with Kriti Sanon for Mimi). Cultural professor Rachel Dwyer noted, "Meena Kumari was a heroine of the post-Independence cinema [just as] Alia Bhatt is of today’s post-Bollywood.”

In the same year, Bhatt took on a brief role in the Telugu-language period film RRR, starring N. T. Rama Rao Jr. and Ram Charan. Even though she learnt to speak her dialogues in the language, a dubbing artist voiced her lines. It emerged as the third highest-grossing Indian film of all time. She next starred as a victim of domestic abuse in the Netflix black comedy film Darlings, which marked her first production venture under her company Eternal Sunshine Productions. Namrata Joshi found her to be "perfectly at home in the role of an ordinary Mumbai chawl girl". The film became the most watched Indian film globally in its opening weekend on Netflix, and won her the Filmfare OTT Award for Best Actress in a Web Original Film. In her final release of 2022, Bhatt starred opposite Ranbir Kapoor in Ayan Mukerji's fantasy film Brahmāstra: Part One – Shiva. The first part in a planned trilogy, the film took five years to film. Made on a production and marketing budget of around ₹4 billion (US$43 million), the film is one of the most expensive Indian films. Simon Abrams of the TheWrap bemoaned that Bhatt had been underused in a poorly written part, and disliked her chemistry with Kapoor. It earned ₹4.31 billion (US$46 million) to rank as the highest-grossing Hindi film of 2022.

Bhatt reunited with Johar for his directorial, the romantic comedy Rocky Aur Rani Kii Prem Kahaani (2023), co-starring Ranveer Singh. Filming and release were delayed by a few months due to her pregnancy. Praising her look in the film, WION's Shomini Sen believed that Bhatt had improved upon a predictable character, but preferred the meatier role of Singh. Earning over ₹3.5 billion (US$37 million) worldwide, it emerged as the year's seventh highest-grossing Hindi film. She won her fifth Best Actress award at Filmfare, tying the record for most wins in the category with Nutan and Kajol. Bhatt expanded to American cinema in the same year with Heart of Stone, a Netflix spy film co-starring Gal Gadot and Jamie Dornan. Playing a villainous computer hacker, she performed her career's first action sequences while pregnant. Critics panned the film; IndieWire's Kate Erbland wrote that Bhatt "sells a role that is thinly written to the point of insult.” The film had strong viewership on Netflix.

Bhatt attached herself as an executive producer on the crime drama series Poacher for its streaming release on Amazon Prime Video in 2024, after it premiered at the 2023 Sundance Film Festival. In Jigra, an action thriller produced under Dharma Productions and her company Eternal Sunshine, she played a troubled woman who attempts to rescue her brother (played by Vedang Raina) from an East Asian prison. Bhatt said that she was drawn to the protective character due to the recent birth of her daughter. Citing it as one of her weaker performances in a mixed review of the film, Saibal Chatterjee was appreciative of her against-type portrayal of a heroic character challenging gender norms. The film did not perform well commercially, though Bhatt received Filmfare Award nominations for Best Actress and Best Actress (Critics), winning the former and becoming the actress with the most wins in the category.

Continuing her work in action films, Bhatt joined the YRF Spy Universe and headlined Alpha (2026), portraying a genetically enhanced super-soldier who goes rogue. Following the release of the film's teaser, her casting and suitability for an action-heavy role attracted pre-release criticism from some commentators, who questioned her ability to carry the part. Writing on the subject, Shomini Sen concurred that "somehow a petite Alia does not really fit the bill of a deadly spy who takes on men double her size with complete nonchalance" despite her strong screen presence. It emerged as a box-office bomb and the lowest-grossing film of the franchise. Also in 2026, Bhatt produced the romantic comedy Don't Be Shy, taking an active creative role in the project and expressing particular interest in the opportunity to launch four new actors and a debutant director. She will reteam with Bhansali in the romantic drama Love & War, co-starring Ranbir Kapoor and Vicky Kaushal and feature in the horror sequel to Tumbbad.

== Other work ==
=== Singing and stage performances ===
Bhatt has performed playback singing for the song "Sooha Saaha" in Highway (2014). A. R. Rahman, the composer of the film, invited her to his music school to undergo training. In the same year, she sang the acoustic version of the song "Samjhawan", for the composers Sharib-Toshi, in Humpty Sharma Ki Dulhania. For the soundtrack of Udta Punjab (2016), she sang an alternate version of the song "Ikk Kudi", with her co-star Diljit Dosanjh. She reunited with Dosanjh in 2024 for the song "Chal Kudiye" from the soundtrack of Jigra.

Bhatt has performed on stage at the Filmfare, Screen and Stardust award ceremonies, and has also participated in a stage show in Hong Kong alongside Dhawan and Malhotra. She participated in a charity event with Dhawan, Malhotra, Aditya Roy Kapur, Shraddha Kapoor and Huma Qureshi to raise funds for the victims of the 2013 North India floods. She also performed in various cities of America for the "Dream Team 2016" tour, alongside Johar, the actors Dhawan, Malhotra, Roy Kapur, Katrina Kaif, and Parineeti Chopra, and the singer Badshah.

=== Philanthropy ===
Bhatt supports various causes and charitable organisations. She took part in a campaign for PETA in 2013 to raise awareness on homeless animals. In 2021, PETA India named her as the Person of the Year for her work in support of an animal-friendly fashion industry and her advocacy for dogs and cats. She joined a charity fundraiser in 2015 organised by Cuddles Foundation for cancer-stricken children, and in 2017, she performed in a fashion show to support the cause. Also in 2017, she launched an ecological initiative named CoExist to raise awareness about the welfare of street animals. The initiative launched a donation drive that year, to make dog collars from discarded denims. Bhatt collaborated with Facebook for a campaign named Find Your Green, to campaign for environmentalism.

In 2018, Bhatt joined Aamir Khan's Paani Foundation; she visited Latur, a village in Maharashtra, and helped Khan with on-ground watershed management work. She also launched an initiative named Mi Wardrobe is Su Wardrobe (MiSu), through which she auctioned clothes from her personal wardrobe to provide electricity to a village in Karnataka. Bhatt collaborated with the Indian arm of the NGO ActionAid in 2021 to provide essentials to underprivileged communities affected by the COVID-19 pandemic. In 2022, she became the first actress from India to partner with the Mandarin Oriental Hotel Group for their "I'm a Fan" campaign, through which she raised funds for the Salaam Bombay Foundation, which helps underprivileged adolescents. Under MiSu, Bhatt sold the saris she wore in her film Rocky Aur Rani Kii Prem Kahaani (2023) to raise funds for women's healthcare. The following year, she hosted a charity gala in London for the Salaam Bombay Foundation.

=== Entrepreneurship ===
Bhatt designed her own clothing line for women in 2014 for the online fashion portal Jabong.com and in 2018, she launched her own line of handbags for VIP Industries. She is also an investor in the beauty company Nykaa and in India's first biomaterial startup Phool.co. In 2022, she launched her own sustainable maternity and children's clothing brand, named Ed-a-Mamma. For helping to nurture kids’ love for animals and nature, Ed-a-Mamma was awarded the PETA India's Vegan Fashion Award for Best Vegan Kidswear Brand in 2021. As of July 2023, the company has an estimated valuation of ₹1.5 billion (US$16 million). In September that year, Reliance Retail acquired a majority stake of 51% in the company. The following year, Bhatt wrote the children's picture book Ed Finds a Home, the first part in a planned The Adventures of Ed-a-Mamma series, about a young girl with supernatural abilities. In 2026, Ed-a-Mamma expanded into baby personal care products with its "Your Baby Safe" range.

== Personal life ==
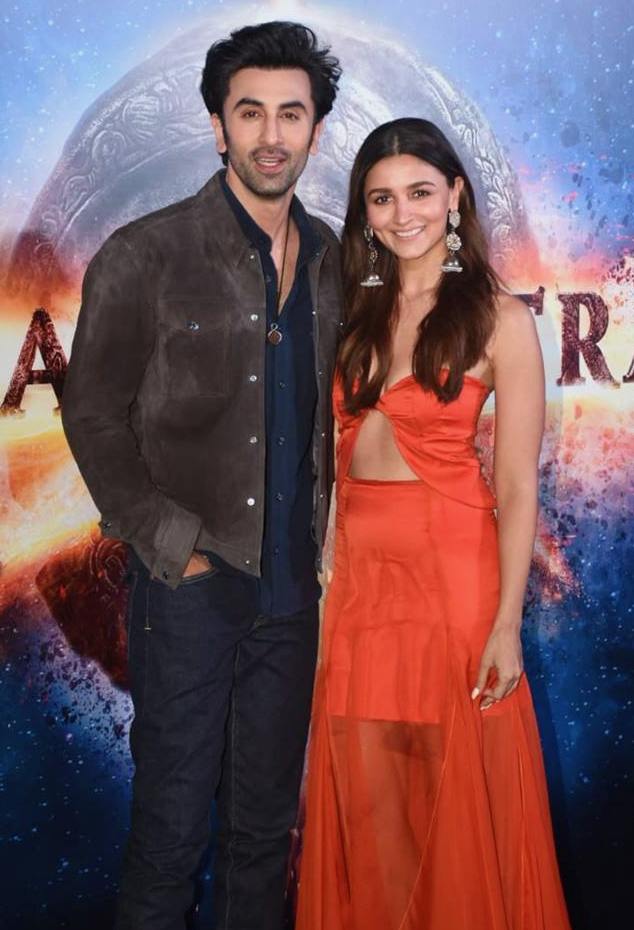
Bhatt and her husband Ranbir Kapoor, pictured in 2021

Bhatt has frequently combated negative attention, including online trolling, for benefiting from nepotism within the Hindi film industry. When asked about how she deals with it, she said, "Of course, I felt bad. But feeling bad is a small price to pay for the work that you are respected and loved for." This criticism has extended to Johar, who often praises her publicly and casts her in most of his productions; their critics believe that this favouritism comes at the cost of opportunities for other actresses. Johar defended his admiration of Bhatt by saying that he feels parental towards her.

During an appearance on Johar's talk show Koffee with Karan in 2014, Bhatt incorrectly named Prithviraj Chauhan as the President of India. This led to widespread trolling of Bhatt's IQ. Bhatt countered this by acting in a satirical YouTube video for All India Bakchod, named Alia Bhatt - Genius of the Year. Journalist Malavika Sangghvi noted that by making fun of herself, Bhatt had "managed to counter all her critics and, in fact, endear herself to them.”

Early in her career, Bhatt was reluctant to discuss her personal life, stating that she would never publicly talk about her relationships. Despite media speculation, she did not speak about dating actor Sidharth Malhotra, but spoke fondly about their bond in 2019, after they had broken up. In 2018, Ranbir Kapoor, her co-star in Brahmāstra, revealed that he and Bhatt were dating. They married on 14 April 2022 in a traditional Hindu ceremony at their apartment in Mumbai. On 6 November that year, she gave birth to their daughter, Raha.

As of 2022, Bhatt lives primarily in Mumbai, and she also has a home in London. In 2023, she called out two paparazzi for invading her privacy by taking pictures of her in her living room from an adjoining building. In the book Being Bollywood: Postfeminism, Celebrity Culture and Femininity in the Global South (2023), author Viraj Suparsad wrote that Bhatt was among a new generation of Indian actresses who successfully balanced her professional life alongside marriage and motherhood. He also took note of how she had to portray herself as subscribing to existing social mores of domestic servitude to not alienate a largely patriarchal audience. In 2024, Bhatt revealed that she was diagnosed with attention deficit hyperactivity disorder.

== Media image and artistry ==
The writer Sucharita Tyagi describes Bhatt's personality as "funny, endearing, silly and unapologetic.” The journalist Raja Sen, in 2022, described Bhatt as "petite compared to her contemporaries" and wrote that she uses her "girlishness and diminutive size" to surprise those who might underestimate her ability to play certain roles or dominate the screen. Suhani Singh of India Today wrote that despite her petite frame, she "can appear larger than life on screen."

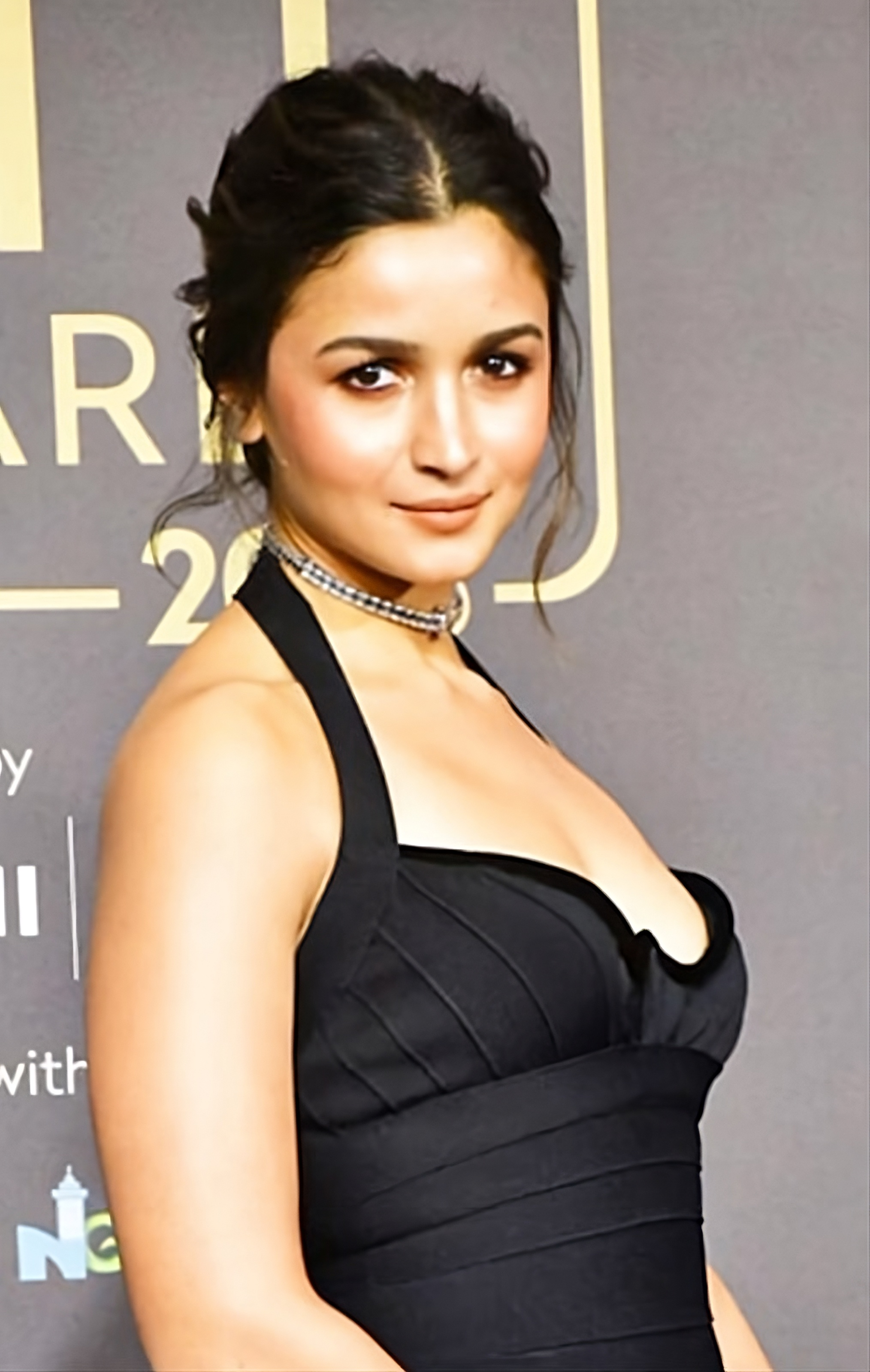
Bhatt in 2025

Laura Zornosa of Time magazine believes that Bhatt specialises in playing "fiercely tenacious lead roles", and Liz Kang of CNN has identified a theme of "dynamic, unconventional female characters in troubling circumstances.” Journalist Ishita Sengupta, writing for Frontline, noted that she has "played women who have opinions, ambition, independence, and intent. But more crucially, they have the space to be unlikeable." Ranjita Ganesan of Rediff.com opined that she is "known for her moving portrayals of breakdowns.” Bhatt relies on instinct and spontaneity in her performances. Her directors, Meghna Gulzar and Shakun Batra believe that she prepares extensively for a part, but according to Gulzar, she internalises her character and ultimately "act[s] from her gut." Bhatt said that she does not deconstruct her craft, believing that "I'd become a machine rather than a human being", adding that she chooses contrasting projects to "satisfy my extremely impatient, monotony-abhorring kind of brain.” Analysing Bhatt's career trend, Ganesan believed that unlike her contemporaries, she quickly emerged as a bankable star. Trade journalist Joginder Tuteja calculated that by 2022, she had a "track record of 13 hits out of 15 releases." Box Office India ranked Bhatt as the most successful Hindi film actress in both their 2018 and 2023 reports. In 2023, journalist Rajeev Masand named her one of Hindi cinema's best actresses of all time.

Forbes Asia has featured Bhatt in their 30 Under 30 list of 2017 and in their 100 Digital Stars list of 2020. She has appeared in Forbes India's Celebrity 100 list since 2014, peaking at the eighth position in 2019. That year, the magazine estimated her annual income to be ₹592 million (US$6.3 million) and listed her as the highest-paid actress in the country. In 2015, she appeared on HuffPost's "100 Most Influential Women on Twitter" list. In 2018 and 2019, the Indian edition of GQ featured her among the nation's 50 most influential young people and credited her for "striking a balance between big-budget, all-star blowouts and more script-oriented films.” In 2018, the market research firm YouGov named her India's ninth most influential celebrity. The magazine Femina has featured her in listings of women achievers in 2019 and 2021. In 2020, the UK magazine Eastern Eye featured her in their dynamic dozen for the decade list. From 2022 to 2025, she was featured in The Indian Express's listing of the most powerful Indians, and she was featured in a similar list by India Today in 2023. In 2022, Mark Kermode of The Guardian named Bhatt among the year's ten best performers. Also in 2022, Time magazine awarded her with the TIME100 Impact Award. In the same year, she was also placed in Outlook India's "75 Best Bollywood Actresses" list. Variety featured her in their listing of the Impactful International Women of 2023. In the same year, the British newspaper Financial Times featured her among the 25 most influential women and Business Today featured her in their listing of the most powerful women in business. She was also featured by the Indian edition of Hello! magazine in their 100 most influential list. In 2024, Time named Bhatt as one of the 100 most influential people in the world, and the Gold House organisation featured her in their 100 most impactful Asians list. In the same year, she was placed 4th on IMDb's list of 100 Most Viewed Indian Stars. In 2026, she was named one of National Geographic's 33 Visionary Changemakers. Also in 2026, Time magazine named her to its TIME100 Next India list, recognising her as one of India's emerging influential figures.

In 2020, Bhatt was invited to join the Academy of Motion Picture Arts and Sciences. In 2023, she was named the first Indian global ambassador for the luxury brand Gucci. As ambassador, she attended Gucci's fashion shows in Seoul and at the Milan Fashion Week. The following year, she was announced as one of the global ambassadors for the beauty brand L'Oréal, and walked for them at the Paris Fashion Week. In 2025, she was named the global ambassador for the clothing brand Levi's. Bhatt is the celebrity endorser for a number of other brands and products, including Coca-Cola, Garnier and Maybelline. Bhatt's brand value was estimated by Kroll Inc. (formerly Duff & Phelps) to be US$36.5 million in 2018, the eighth-highest among Indian celebrities. With a brand value of US$68.1 million, she held the seventh position for the next two years; she peaked at the fourth position in 2021 and 2022, with an increased brand value of US$102.9 million in the latter year. The following year, she placed fifth, with a value of US$101.1 million. In 2024, she placed fourth, with her brand value rising to US$116.4 million. In 2026, Fortune India ranked her at ninth place on its inaugural Most Valuable Celebrities list, with a brand value of ₹1,606 crore. As of October 2023, she is the third most-followed Indian actress on Instagram.

Bhatt ranks high on various listings of the most attractive Indian celebrities. In 2014 and 2016, she was listed in "100 Sexiest Woman" by the Indian edition of FHM. The Indian edition of People described her as "India's Most Beautiful Woman" in 2016. Bhatt was listed in first place in The Times of India's "50 Most Desirable Women" list of 2018, and she was named the "Sexiest Asian Woman" by Eastern Eye in 2019. In 2019 and 2023, Bhatt featured in Rediff.com's annual "Top Bollywood Actresses" listing. She has been frequently featured on other Rediff.com lists, including "Bollywood's Most Beautiful Actresses", "Bollywood's Best Actresses Ever" and "Top 10 Bollywood Actresses of all Time".

== Accolades ==
Bhatt won the National Film Award for Best Actress for Gangubai Kathiawadi (2022). She received the Filmfare Award for Best Actress a record-setting six times for her roles in Udta Punjab (2016), Raazi (2018), Gully Boy (2019), Gangubai Kathiawadi (2022), Rocky Aur Rani Kii Prem Kahaani (2023) and Jigra (2024), in addition to the Filmfare Critics Award for Best Actress for Highway (2014). She also won the Filmfare OTT Award for Best Actress in a Web Original Film for Darlings (2022).
