= Dear Zindagi =

2016 Indian film by Gauri Shinde

- Theatrical release poster
- Directed by: Gauri Shinde
- Written by: Gauri Shinde
- Produced by: Gauri Khan; Karan Johar; Gauri Shinde; Apoorva Mehta
- Starring: Alia Bhatt; Shah Rukh Khan
- Cinematography: Laxman Utekar
- Edited by: Hemanti Sarkar
- Music by: Amit Trivedi
- Production companies: Red Chillies Entertainment; Dharma Productions; Hope Productions
- Distributed by: NH Studioz
- Release dates: 23 November 2016 (North America); 25 November 2016 (Worldwide)
- Running time: 150 minutes
- Country: India
- Language: Hindi
- Budget: ₹22 crore
- Box office: ₹138.91 crore

Dear Zindagi (transl. Dear life) is a 2016 Indian Hindi-language coming-of-age drama film written and directed by Gauri Shinde and produced by Gauri Khan, Karan Johar, Apoorva Mehta and Shinde under the banners of Red Chillies Entertainment, Dharma Productions, and Hope Productions, respectively. The film stars Alia Bhatt and Shah Rukh Khan while Ira Dubey, Kunal Kapoor, Angad Bedi, Ali Zafar (in his final Hindi film acting credit), Yashaswini Dayama and debutant Rohit Suresh Saraf in supporting roles. The plot centres on a budding cinematographer who is discontented with her life and meets a free-spirited psychologist who helps her to gain a new perspective on her life.

Development of the film began in 2015, when Shinde signed Bhatt and Shah Rukh Khan for a film to be made under her banner. Principal photography took place in Goa and Mumbai, in the period from 21 January to 20 May 2016. The film features music composed by Amit Trivedi and original song lyrics written by Kausar Munir, who also served as a fellow writer.

Dear Zindagi was released on 23 November 2016 in North America during the Thanksgiving weekend, two days before its worldwide release on 25 November 2016, and grossed ₹138.91 crore at the worldwide box office, thus emerging as a commercial success. It received positive reviews from critics, with particular praise directed towards the themes, direction, screenplay, dialogues, soundtrack and performances, especially Bhatt and Khan's performances.

At the 62nd Filmfare Awards, Dear Zindagi received 2 nominations – Best Actress (Bhatt) and Best Lyricist (Kausar Munir for "Love You Zindagi").

== Plot ==
Kaira is an aspiring cinematographer who dreams of directing her own films and works in Mumbai at a small firm. Blunt and cynical, she is most comfortable with her four best friends, Fatima, Jackie, Raunaq and Ganju. Kaira's life takes a downturn when she sleeps with her friend Raghuvendra, a film producer, and then breaks up with her childhood sweetheart Sid, a pub owner. Raghuvendra later gets engaged to another woman. Kaira's landlord evicts her because the building residents' association is annoyed by her bohemian lifestyle and has requested he only rent apartments to married couples and families. Kaira reluctantly returns to Goa to live with her parents, with whom she has unresolved issues. She spends many sleepless nights in unhappiness and uncertainty.

While in Goa, Kaira seeks out Dr. Jehangir "Jug" Khan, a psychiatrist, for her insomnia after inadvertently having heard him speak at a Mental Health Awareness conference. She warms up to Jug's unconventional methods during their sessions, trying to use them to understand herself. Meanwhile, she meets and starts a relationship with Rumi, a musician, but they quickly break up after she realizes they may not be right for each other. Subsequently, Kaira reunites with her younger brother, Kabir "Kiddo", the only person in her family to whom she confides. Matters with her family come to a head when Kaira has an outburst at a family event, where she confronts her parents about them abandoning and neglecting her as a child for years at her grandparents' house.

Kaira finally narrates the story of her abandonment to Jug. Her parents had left her as a child with her grandparents after their business failed and had neglected her while they tried to rebuild their business and after Kiddo was born, before suddenly taking her back years later. She lost her trust in her parents after overhearing her mother arguing with her grandfather over lying to Kaira about their situation to spare her from the difficult truth. Jug notes she tremendously fears desertion and does not allow herself to commit to relationships, leaving them before they can leave her. He advises her to see her parents as two regular people who are capable of making mistakes instead of focusing on the need to forgive them. Afterwards, Kaira tries to reconcile with her parents and works to finish her short film.

At their last session, Kaira admits to Jug that she has grown to have feelings for him. Jug responds it is normal for a patient to feel this way about their therapist, and while he likes her platonically, a relationship would not be possible between them. The two share a hug before Kaira leaves. Kaira finally completes her short film, which she had worked on for years. At the premiere, her friends, family, and previous partners are present to cheer her on. Kaira meets a furniture designer and initiates a conversation with him.

== Cast ==
Credits adapted from Bollywood Hungama

- Alia Bhatt as Kaira, an aspiring cinematographer, who is also referred to as "Shaira"
- Shah Rukh Khan as Dr. Jehangir "Jug" Khan, a psychologist
- Kunal Kapoor as Raghuvendra, a film producer, one of Kaira's boyfriends
- Angad Bedi as Sid, a restobar owner, another of Kaira's boyfriends
- Ali Zafar as Rumi, a musician and singer-songwriter, yet another of Kaira's boyfriends
- Ira Dubey as Fatima "Fatty"
- Rohit Saraf as Kiddo, Kaira's younger brother
- Yashaswini Dayama as Jackie, Kaira's friend
- Gautmik as Ganju, Kaira's friend
- Yashwant Singh as Kaira's uncle
- Salone Mehta as Kaira's aunt
- Baby Dishita as little Kaira
- Nitika Anand as family friend
- Amit Nagraj as little Kiddo
- Aban Deohans as Kaira's mother
- Atul Kale as Kaira's father
- Martha Xavier Fernandes as Kaira's maternal grandmother
- Madhav Vaze as Kaira's maternal grandfather
- Ivan Sylvester Rodrigues as Kaira's father's friend
- Akanksha Gade as maid Alka
- Aditya Roy Kapur in a guest appearance as a furniture dealer

== Production ==
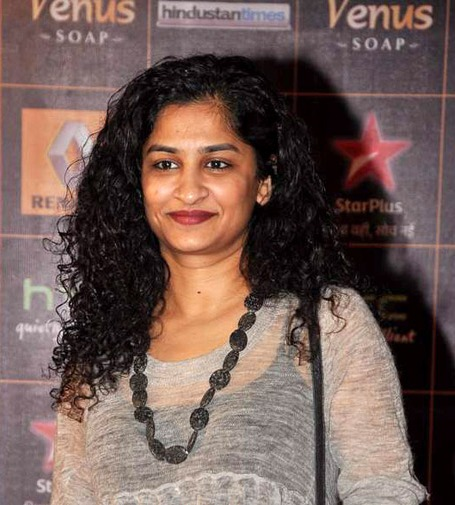
Dear Zindagi writer-director Gauri Shinde

Made on a moderate budget, Dear Zindagi was produced by Gauri Khan of Red Chillies Entertainment, Johar of Dharma Productions and Gauri Shinde of Hope Productions. The film was directed by Shinde, her second directorial after the comedy-drama film English Vinglish (2012). When Shinde was asked in an interview with The Indian Express, whether there is a personal story to Dear Zindagi, she replied, "Dear Zindagi is inspired by life in general. It started with an idea about the connections we make in our lives and how such connections can impact us. That's something that interested me and I tried to develop a story around the philosophy." In August 2015, Shinde revealed that she had "almost" completed working on the screenplay. Pre-production work began in December 2015. Shinde began working in the story at that time, and she chose Goa and Mumbai as the film's key locations. The production crew consisted primarily of people Shinde had worked with in English Vinglish, with the exception of production designer Rupin Suchak—they are film editor Hemanti Sarkar, script assistant Krishnan Hariharan who was elevated to co-writer, language consultant Kausar Munir, who also doubled up as lyricist while playing co-writer, and cinematographer Laxman Utekar.

India Today reported that Bhatt and Khan would star together in Shinde's then-untitled film. Bhatt was very eager to work with Khan, who had earlier launched her as an actress with Student of the Year. It is Khan's first film with Bhatt. It was reported that there would not be any typical romance between the characters of Bhatt and Khan. Shinde confirmed to The Indian Express saying, "It won't be as typical as one expects man and woman to be together." In April 2016, it was reported that Khan would play a love guru who would help Bhatt's character to manage the attention of four people and figure out how to find her true love, and Bhatt would play the role of a filmmaker, whose experiences with all four characters would shape her life and work.

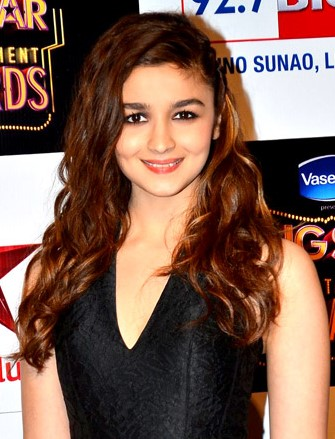
Alia Bhatt (pictured) was eager to work with Shah Rukh Khan in Dear Zindagi

The other actors who were signed up for the film include Ali Zafar, who played the role of rockstar and musician; Angad Bedi, who played the role of Kaira's childhood sweetheart, a restobar owner; Kunal Kapoor, who played the role of Kaira's film producer and invested in Bhatt's film; and Aditya Roy Kapur, who played the role of a charming furniture dealer. Ira Dubey and Yashaswini Dayama played the role of Kaira's best-friends, while Rohit Saraf played the role of her brother.

Principal photography for Dear Zindagi began on 21 January 2016 in Goa. The shoot for the entire film was to be completed in two schedules; one in Goa and the other in Mumbai. The first schedule of Goa was completed in the last week of February 2016 after about 30 days, then the entire cast of the film moved to Mumbai for the second schedule of the film. Bhatt and Shah Rukh Khan enjoyed working together and were looking forward to the next schedule. Bhatt had also moved to Singapore to shoot for a song sequence for the film. The entire shooting of the film ended on 20 May 2016. Bhatt shared the entire shooting experience by posting a group selfie with her team in Singapore, via her Instagram handle. In March 2016, Bhatt said to India.com that she was very excited about appearing with Khan in the film. She had not slept for several nights during the shoot of the film. "It was lovely working with him on the show and on Gauri's film when we recently shot in Goa," she said. On 23 June 2016, The Times of India reported that the title of the film would be Dear Zindagi.

== Music ==
The soundtrack was released by Sony Music India. The full album was released on 4 November 2016, while the audio jukebox was released on 10 November 2016 on YouTube.

The song "Ae Zindagi Gale Laga Le"; written by Gulzar and was originally composed by Ilaiyaraaja and sung by Suresh Wadkar for Sadma (1983); has been recreated for the film. While, lyrics for the other songs in the album are written by Kausar Munir.

== Release ==
The film was released in Canada and the USA on 23 November 2016, and worldwide on 25 November 2016. It opened in about 1200 theatres nationwide and in 600 theatres in other countries. The film also had a special screening on 23 November 2016 in Mumbai. It received good response and positive reviews

Dear Zindagi opened well in multiplexes in Mumbai, Mysore, Tamil Nadu and Kerala, while in North India it had a comparatively decent opening. The film released earlier in North America on account of the Thanksgiving weekend holidays. The film on its first day collected ₹1.19 crore from 127 screens in the United States and ₹8.29 lakhs in Canada from 16 screens. In the extended two-day weekend, the film collected about ₹15.8 million at the North America box office. The film earned a total of ₹94.67 crore in India, grossing ₹136 million worldwide.

=== Critical response ===
Dear Zindagi received positive reviews from critics, with particular praise directed towards Bhatt and Khan's performances, direction, music, screenplay and themes. On review aggregator Rotten Tomatoes, the film holds an approval rating of 73%, based on 15 reviews with an average rating of 6.7/10. Meena Iyer of The Times of India gave the film a 3.5 (out of 5) rating, described Bhatt's character as "feisty", praised Bhatt and Khan's performances. Namrata Joshi of The Hindu rated the film 3 out of 5 stars, noting that "the chemistry between Bhatt and Khan makes the film sparkle despite the heavy-handed writing." Ananya Bhattacharya of India Today, giving the same rating, said that Dear Zindagi is "an emotional joyride which won't harm you when watched once." She recommended to watch the film due to the performances by its two principal actors. Mayank Shekhar of Mid-Day also rated it 3 (out of 5) stars, saying: "This film, at its core, is conversational sort of feature, but mostly quiet, even indoorsy."

Conversely, Rohit Bhatnagar writing for Deccan Chronicle gave the film 2.5 out of 5 stars, and thought that the film was "definitely a one-time-watch", and concluded, that the film deserves a watch but "only for amazing performances and nothing else." A reviewer for Bollywood Hungama giving the same rating to the film commented that Dear Zindagi was "a slow-paced cerebral and contemporary slice of life tale about the challenges today's generation of girls face in a rapidly shifting landscape." Sweta Kaushal of Hindustan Times rated the film 2 out of 5 stars, and wrote, "There is a lot of banter in the film that is supposed to be deep and philosophical but is really just plain, hollow banter", and concluded, that the film "could-have-been-amazing." Shubhra Gupta of The Indian Express gave it a negative review and summed up her review by writing that the "film could have been a solid drama with emotional heft but despite great performances by the two stars, the feature remains strictly boiler-plate."

Christine Iyer of The National awarded the film 4 out of 5 stars, praised Khan's performance and said that he "absolutely shines in the role of soft-spoken therapist Jehangir 'Jug' Khan in this gentle drama by Gauri Shinde." Manjusha Radhakrishnan of Gulf News rated the film 3.5 out of 5 stars and described the tale of Bhatt as "joyously entertaining", and advised to "make a date with Dear Zindagi." Anisha Jhaveri of IndieWire gave the film a grade of A-minus, and said that the film's plot had a "powerful message, that gives Dear Zindagi its substance." Shilpa Jamkhandikar of Reuters negatively stated: "The need to explain every moment and articulate every emotion pulls down Dear Zindagi; even the brilliant chemistry between the two leads cannot salvage the film from this fatal flaw." Andy Webster of The New York Times described it an "insightful movie", and a "resounding victory."

== Accolades ==
| Award | Date of ceremony | Category | Nominees | Result | References |
|---|---|---|---|---|---|
| Screen Awards | 4 December 2016 | Best Film | Gauri Shinde Gauri Khan Karan Johar | Nominated | |
| Screen Awards | 4 December 2016 | Best Director | Gauri Shinde | Nominated | |
| Screen Awards | 4 December 2016 | Best Actress | Alia Bhatt | Nominated | |
| Screen Awards | 4 December 2016 | Best Supporting Actor | Shah Rukh Khan | Nominated | |
| Stardust Awards | 19 December 2016 | Best Actress | Alia Bhatt | Nominated | |
| Stardust Awards | 19 December 2016 | Editor's Choice Performer of the Year | Alia Bhatt | Nominated | |
| Stardust Awards | 19 December 2016 | Best Supporting Actor | Shah Rukh Khan | Nominated | |
| Stardust Awards | 19 December 2016 | Best Story | Gauri Shinde | Nominated | |
| Filmfare Awards | 14 January 2017 | Best Actress | Alia Bhatt | Nominated | |
| Filmfare Awards | 14 January 2017 | Best Lyricist | Kausar Munir for "Love You Zindagi" | Nominated | |
| Zee Cine Awards | 11 March 2017 | Best Actor – Female | Alia Bhatt | Nominated | |
| International Indian Film Academy Awards | 14 July 2017 | Best Actress in a Leading Role | Alia Bhatt | Nominated | |
| BIG Sony Entertainment Awards | 29 July 2017 | Most Entertaining Actor (Film) – Female | Alia Bhatt | Nominated | |
| Indian Film Festival of Melbourne | 10 August 2017 | Best Actress | Alia Bhatt | Nominated | |

== Controversy ==
In the first week of November 2016, it was reported that Ali Zafar has been replaced by Tahir Raj Bhasin in the film due to the tensions created after the 2016 Uri terror attack and the subsequent ban on Pakistani actors by the Maharashtra Navnirman Sena. However, on 15 November 2016, Pakistan's newspaper Dawn reported that Bhatt denied the rumours at an event on 14 November 2016. On being asked, she said: "Nobody is being replaced. The film will release in its full form." Ali Zafar has sung two songs for the film, but those were dubbed by Arijit Singh, whose versions were added into the soundtrack album instead of Zafar's. Later, Zafar's songs were officially shared online.

Shortly after the release of the film, Temple Street Productions sent a legal notice to Karan Johar's Dharma Productions for copyright infringement, alleging that the movie was inspired in detail by the Canadian television series Being Erica. Shinde has denied the claim.
