= List of Filmfare Award records =

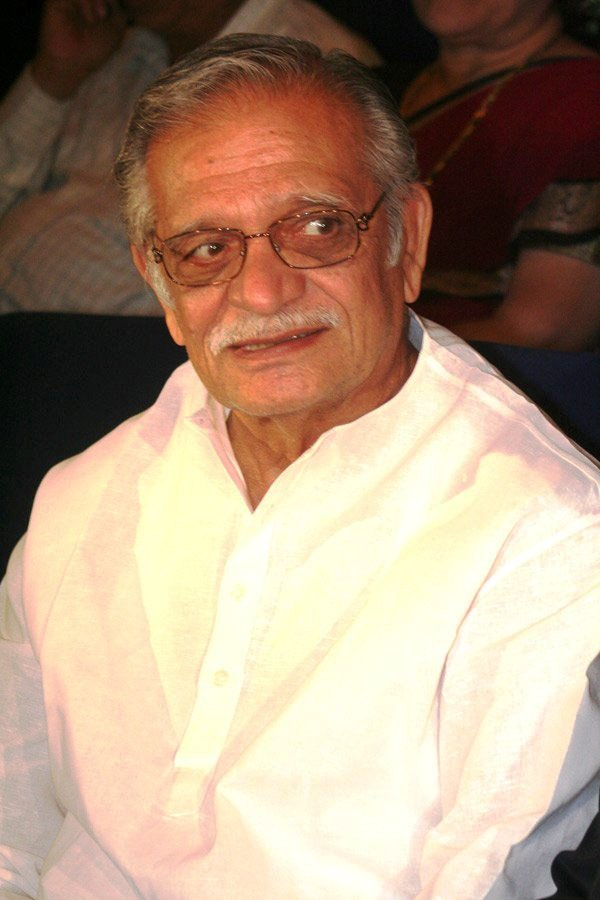
Gulzar, the record-holder for most Filmfare Awards won (22)

This list of Filmfare Award records is current as of the 70th Filmfare Awards ceremony, held on 11 October 2025, which honored the best films of 2024.

== Film records ==
- Most awards won by a single film:

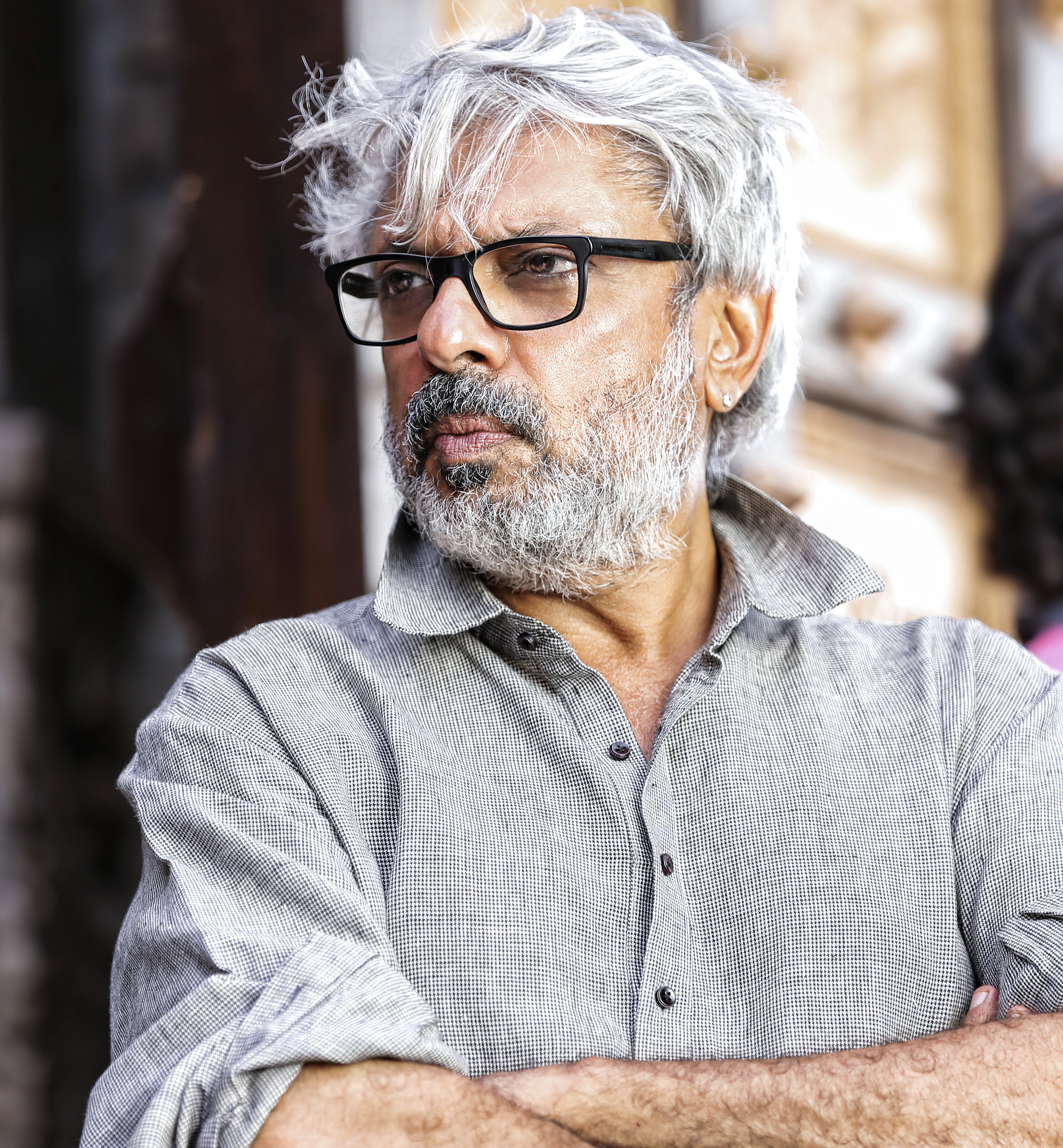
Sanjay Leela Bhansali, director with the most films (4) winning the highest number of awards.

Film	Year	Awards
Gully Boy	2020	13
Laapataa Ladies	2025	13
Devdas	2003	11
Black	2006	11
Dilwale Dulhania Le Jayenge	1996	10
Gangubai Kathiawadi	2022	10
Madhumati	1958	9
1942: A Love Story	1995	9
Kaho Naa… Pyaar Hai	2001	9
Omkara	2007	9
Bajirao Mastani	2016	9
Sardar Udham	2021	9

- Most nominations received by a single film:

Film	Year	Nominations
Laapataa Ladies	2024	24
Rang De Basanti	2007	21
Rocky Aur Rani Kii Prem Kahaani	2023	20
Animal	2023	19
Gully Boy	2020	19
Shershaah	2021	19
Kabhi Alvida Na Kehna	2006	18
Padmaavat	2019	18
Kuch Kuch Hota Hai	1998	17
Gangubai Kathiawadi	2022	
Hum Dil De Chuke Sanam	2000	16
Ludo	2020	16
Pathaan	2023	16
Devdas	2002	15
Kabhi Khushi Kabhi Gum	2001	15
Kill	2024	15
Omkara	2006	15
Raazi	2018	15
Thappad	2020	15
Veer-Zaara	2004	15

== Individual records ==
- Most awards won by a male:

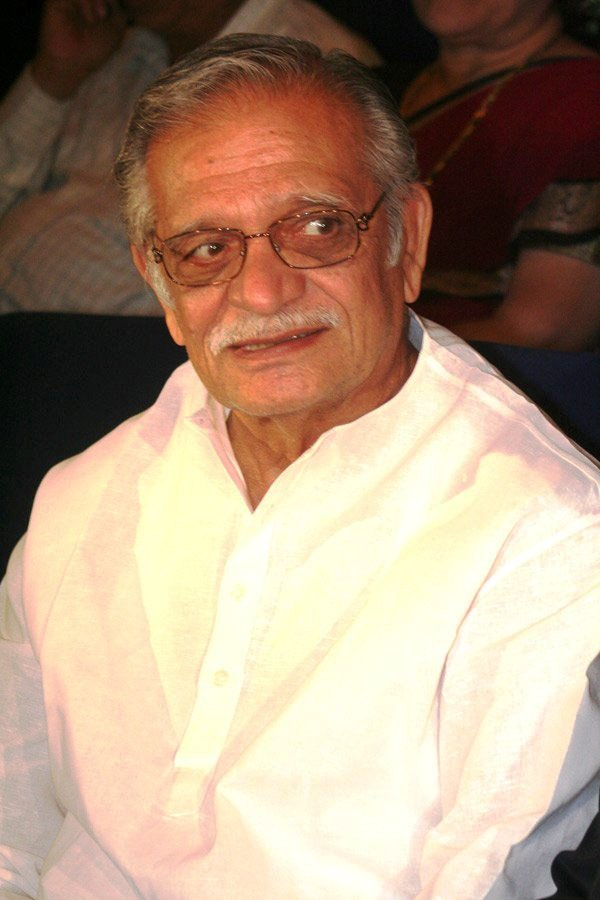
Gulzar holds the record for the most awards won by an individual (22).

Recipient(s)	Total awards won	Categories
Gulzar	22	Best Film (Critics) (1); Best Director (1); Best Lyricist (13); Best Story (1); Best Dialogue (4); Best Documentary (1); Lifetime Achievement Award (1)
Amitabh Bachchan	17	Best Actor (5); Best Actor (Critics) (4); Best Supporting Actor (3); Lifetime Achievement Award (1); Power Award (1); Superstar of the Millennium Award (1); Special Award for completing 40 years (1); Cine Icon Award (1)
Shah Rukh Khan	16	Best Actor (8); Best Actor (Critics) (2); Best Villain (1); Best Male Debut (1); Power Award (2); Special Award Swiss Consulate Trophy (1); Cine Icon Award (1)
A. R. Rahman	15	Best Music Director (10); Best Background Score (4); R. D. Burman Award (1)
Sanjay Leela Bhansali	13	Best Director (5); Best Film (4); Best Film (Critics) (2); Best Music Director (1); Best Scene (1)

- Most awards won by a female:

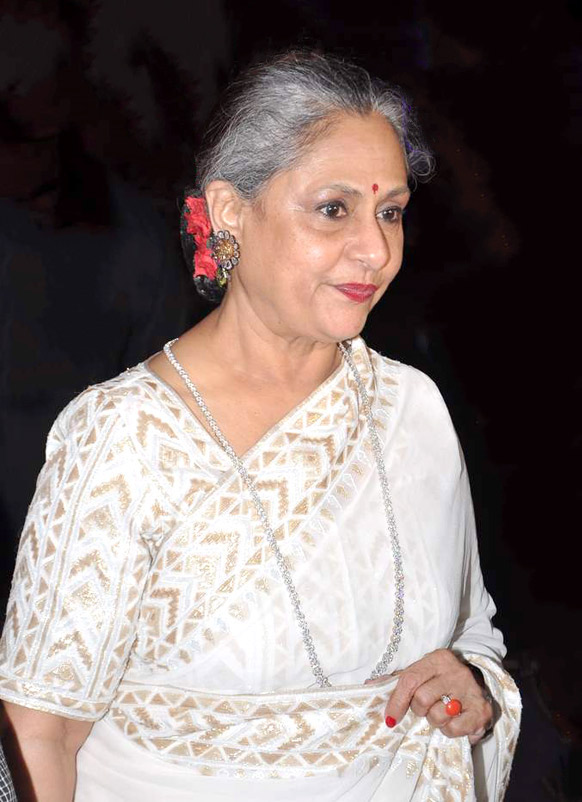
Jaya Bachchan holds the record for the most awards won by a female (10).

Recipient(s)	Total awards won	Categories
Jaya Bachchan	10	Best Actress (3); Best Supporting Actress (3); Special Award (3); Lifetime Achievement Award (1)
Asha Bhosle	9	Best Female Playback Singer (7); Special Award (1); Lifetime Achievement Award (1)
Saroj Khan	8	Best Choreography (8)
Rani Mukerji	8	Best Actress (2); Best Actress (Critics) (3); Best Supporting Actress (3)
Vidya Balan	8	Best Actress (4); Best Actress (Critics) (2); Best Female Debut (1); Filmfare Special Award (1)
Lata Mangeshkar	7	Best Female Playback Singer (4); Special Award (2); Lifetime Achievement Award (1)
Alka Yagnik	7	Best Female Playback Singer (7)
Tabu	7	Best Actress (Critics) (5); Best Supporting Actress (1); Best Female Debut (1)
Shreya Ghoshal	7	Best Female Playback Singer (6); R. D. Burman Award (1)
Farah Khan	7	Best Choreography (7)
Alia Bhatt	7	Best Actress (6); Best Actress (Critics) (1)
Nutan	7	Best Actress (5); Best Supporting Actress (1); Special Award (1)
Kajol	7	Best Actress (5); Best Actor In A Negative Role (1); Special Award (1)

== Directing records ==
- Most awards for Best Director:

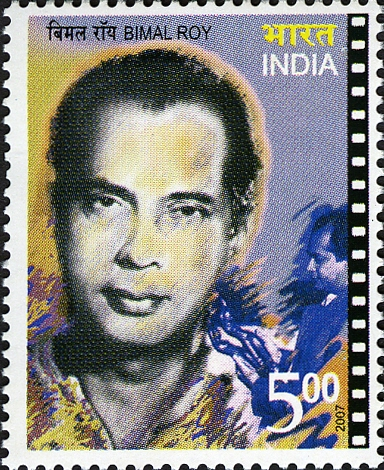
Bimal Roy — record holder for most Best Director awards (7).

Director(s)	Awards
Bimal Roy	7
Sanjay Leela Bhansali	5
Yash Chopra	4
Raj Kapoor	4

- Director with most Best Film wins:
  - Sanjay Leela Bhansali — 5
- Director with most Best Film Critics' wins:
  - Mani Kaul — 4

== Acting records ==
- Most awards for Best Actor:

Actor	Awards
Dilip Kumar	8
Shah Rukh Khan	8
Amitabh Bachchan	5
Hrithik Roshan	4
Ranbir Kapoor	4

- Most awards for Best Actress:

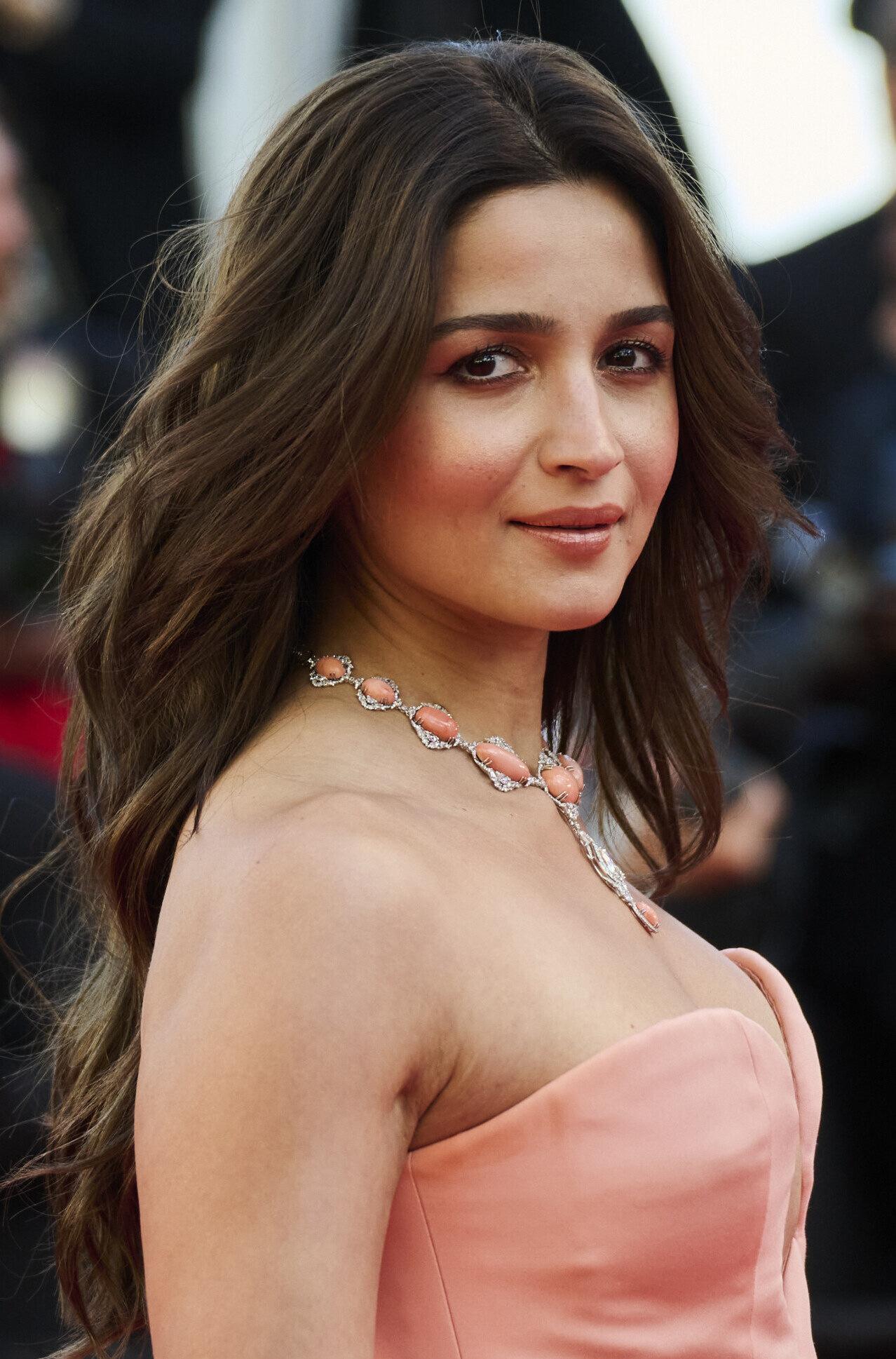
Alia Bhatt — record holder for most Best Actress awards (6).

Actress	Awards
Alia Bhatt	6
Nutan	5
Kajol	5
Meena Kumari	4
Madhuri Dixit	4
Vidya Balan	4

- Most awards for Best Actor (Critics):

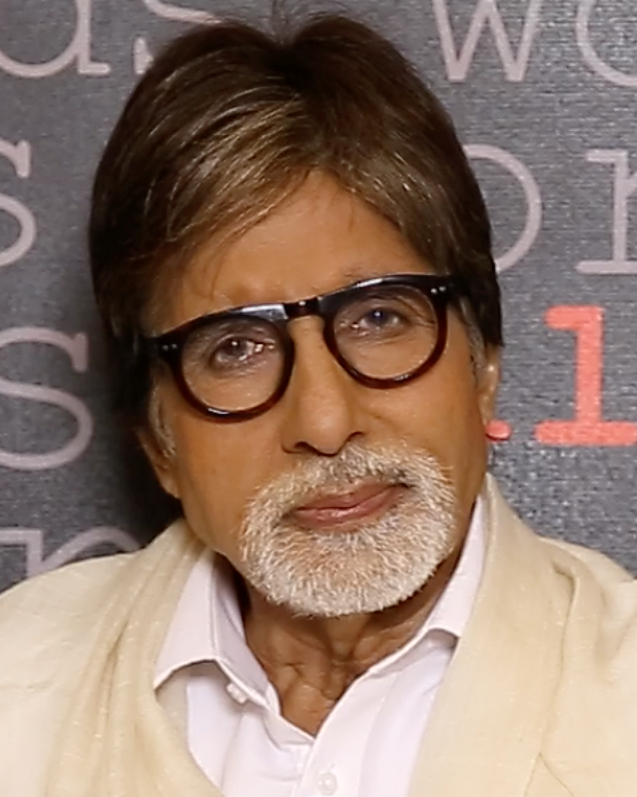
Amitabh Bachchan — record holder for most Best Actor Critics' awards (4).

Actor	Awards
Amitabh Bachchan	4
Manoj Bajpayee	3
Rajkummar Rao	3

- Most awards for Best Actress (Critics):

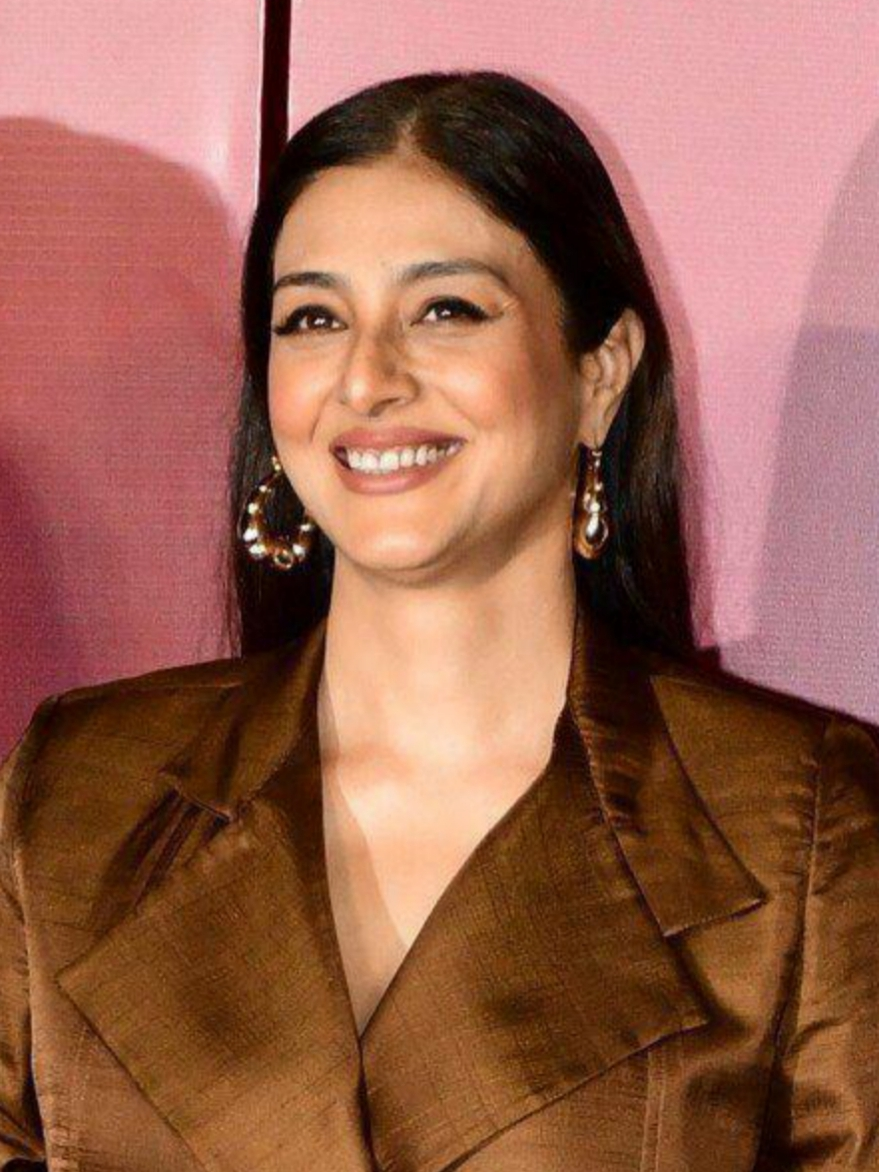
Tabu — record holder for most Best Actress Critics' awards (5).

Actress	Awards
Tabu	5
Rani Mukerji	3
Manisha Koirala	3

- Most awards for Best Supporting Actor:

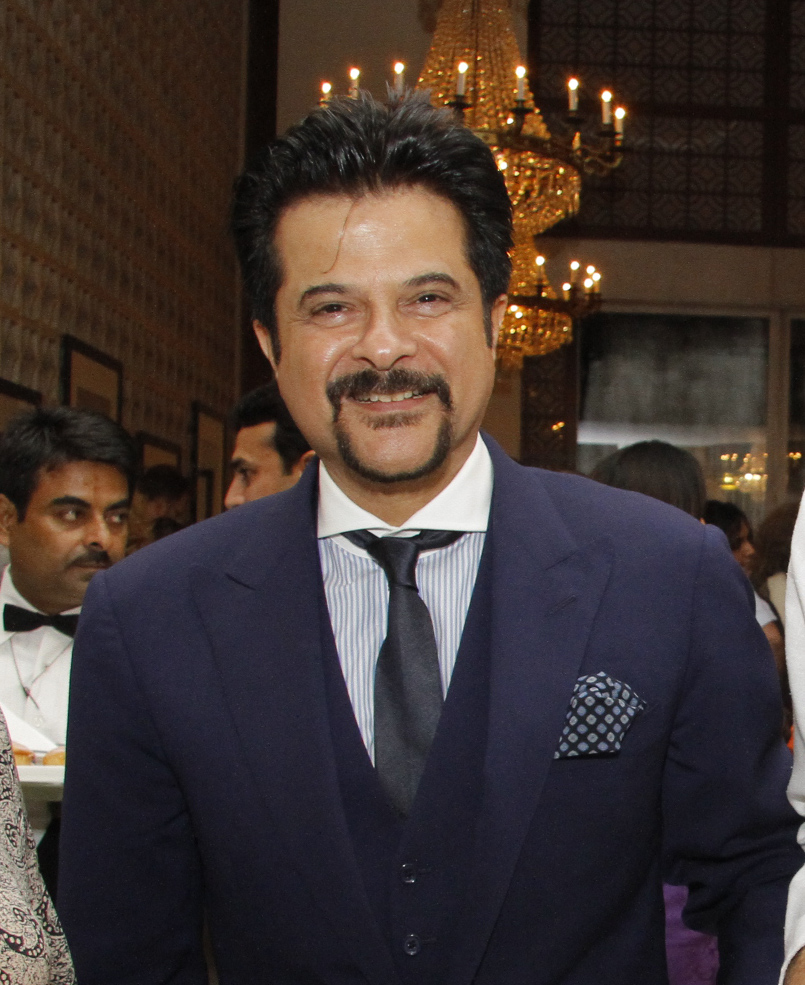
Anil Kapoor, record holder for most Best Supporting Actor awards (4).

Actor	Awards
Anil Kapoor	4
Pran	3
Amrish Puri	3
Amitabh Bachchan	3
Abhishek Bachchan	3

- Most awards for Best Supporting Actress:

Actress	Awards
Nirupa Roy	3
Farida Jalal	3
Jaya Bachchan	3
Rani Mukerji	3
Supriya Pathak	3

- Most awards for Best Comedian:

(Discontinued since 2007)

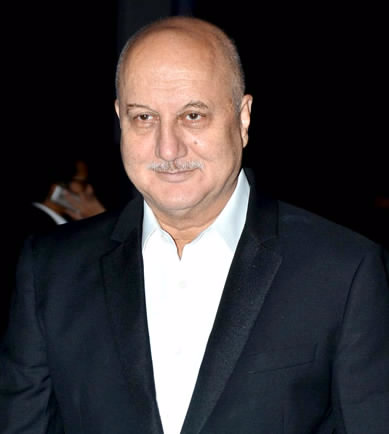
Anupam Kher, record holder for most Best Comedian awards (5).

Actor/Actress	Awards
Anupam Kher	5
Mehmood	4
Deven Verma	3
Utpal Dutt	3

- Most awards for Best Villain:

(Discontinued since 2007)

Actor/Actress	Awards
Ashutosh Rana	2
Nana Patekar	2

== Music records ==
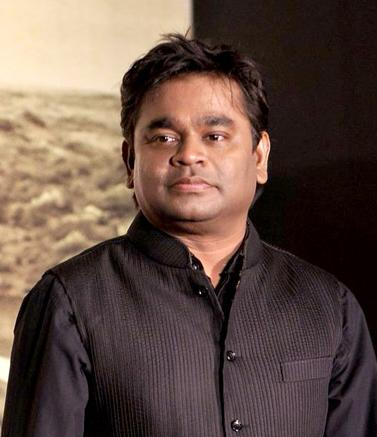
A. R. Rahman holds the record for the most awards won by a musician (14).

- Most awards for Best Music Director:

Music Director	Awards
A. R. Rahman	10
Shankar Jaikishan	9
Laxmikant–Pyarelal	7
Pritam	6

- Most awards for Best Lyricist:

Lyricist	Awards
Gulzar	13
Javed Akhtar	8
Anand Bakshi	4
Amitabh Bhattacharya	4

- Most awards for Best Male Playback Singer:

Singer	Awards
Kishore Kumar	8
Arijit Singh	8
Mohammed Rafi	6
Kumar Sanu	5
Udit Narayan	5

- Most awards for Best Female Playback Singer:

Singer	Awards
Asha Bhosle	7
Alka Yagnik	7
Shreya Ghoshal	6
Lata Mangeshkar	4
Anuradha Paudwal	4
Kavita Krishnamurthy	4

- Most awards for Best Background Score:

Composer	Awards
A. R. Rahman	4
Amit Trivedi	3

== Technical records ==
- Most awards for Best Screenplay:
  - Salim–Javed, Basu Chatterjee and Rajkumar Hirani – 3 awards each
- Most awards for Best Dialogue:
  - Gulzar and Rajkumar Hirani – 4 awards each
- Most awards for Best Story:
  - Mukhram Sharma – 3 awards
- Most awards for Best Editing:
  - A. Sreekar Prasad – 4 awards
- Most awards for Best Cinematography:
  - Kamal Bose – 5 awards
- Most awards for Best Choreography:
  - Saroj Khan – 8 awards
- Most awards for Best Costume Design:
  - Dolly Ahluwalia – 3 awards
- Most awards for Best Sound Design:
  - Bishwadeep Chatterjee – 4 awards
- Most awards for Best Special Effects:
  - Red Chillies VFX – 5 awards
- Most awards for Best Action:
  - Sham Kaushal – 5 awards
- Most awards for Best Art Direction:
  - M. R. Acharekar, Sudhendu Roy, Shanti Das, Ajit Banerjee, Sharmishta Roy, Nitin Chandrakant Desai, Subrata Chakraborty and Amit Ray – 3 awards each

== Age-related records ==
- Youngest Best Director winners:
  - Aditya Chopra, age 24 (Dilwale Dulhania Le Jayenge, 1996)
  - Kunal Kohli, age 25 (Hum Tum, 2005)
  - Karan Johar, age 26 (Kuch Kuch Hota Hai, 1999)
- Oldest Best Director winners:
  - Vidhu Vinod Chopra, age 71 (12th Fail, 2024)
  - Raj Kapoor, age 62 (Ram Teri Ganga Maili, 1987)
  - Sanjay Leela Bhansali, age 60 (Gangubai Kathiawadi, 2023)
- Youngest winners of an acting award:
  - Darsheel Safary, age 10 (Best Actor Critics', Taare Zameen Par, 2008)
  - Ayesha Kapur, age 11 (Best Supporting Actress, Black, 2006)
- Oldest winner of an acting award:
  - Farrukh Jaffar, age 88 (Best Supporting Actress, Gulabo Sitabo, 2021)
- Youngest nominees of an acting award:
  - Darsheel Safary, age 10 (Best Actor & Best Actor Critics', Taare Zameen Par, 2008)
  - Ayesha Kapur, age 11 (Best Supporting Actress, Black, 2006)
- Oldest nominee of an acting award:
  - Kamini Kaushal, age 92 (Best Supporting Actress, Kabir Singh, 2020)
- Youngest winner of an music award:
  - Nazia Hassan, age 15 (Best Female Playback Singer, "Aap Jaisa Koi" from Qurbani, 1981)
- Oldest winner of an music award:
  - Gulzar, age 86 (Best Lyricist, "Chhapaak" from Chhapaak, 2021)

== Artists with all nominations within one category in a year ==
- Artists with all nominations in a single category in a year:

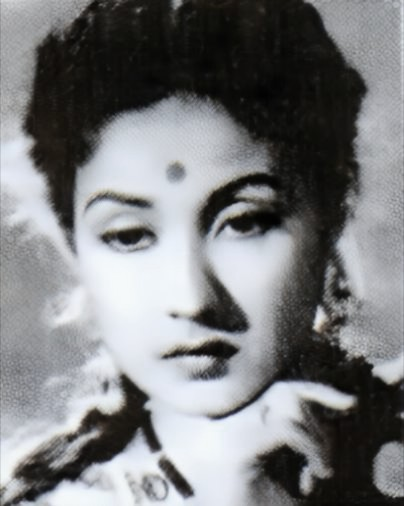
Meena Kumari, the first to receive all nominations in a single category in a year.

Year	Artist	Category
1963	Meena Kumari	Best Actress
1969	Mohammed Rafi	Best Male Playback Singer
1973	Asha Bhosle	Best Female Playback Singer
1985	Kishore Kumar	Best Male Playback Singer
1994	Alka Yagnik	Best Female Playback Singer
2005	Javed Akhtar	Best Lyricist

== Most consecutive wins in a single category ==
- Kumar Sanu (1991–1995) and Arijit Singh (2016–2020) jointly hold the record for winning the Best Male Playback Singer award 5 consecutive times each.
- Asha Bhosle holds the record for winning the Best Female Playback Singer award 4 consecutive times from 1972–1975.
- Laxmikant–Pyarelal (1978–1981) and A. R. Rahman (2007–2010) jointly hold the record for winning the Best Music Director award 4 consecutive times each.
- Bimal Roy holds the record for winning the Best Director award 3 consecutive times on two separate occasions from 1954–1956 and again from 1959–1961.
- Dilip Kumar holds the record for winning the Best Actor award 3 consecutive times from 1956–1958.
- Alia Bhatt holds the record for winning the Best Actress award 3 consecutive times from 2023–2025.

== See also ==
- Filmfare Awards
