= Darlings (film) =

2022 Indian film by Jasmeet K. Reen

- Official release poster
- Directed by: Jasmeet K. Reen
- Written by: Parveez Sheikh; Jasmeet K. Reen
- Produced by: Alia Bhatt; Gauri Khan; Gaurav Verma; Shaheen Bhatt (uncredited)
- Starring: Alia Bhatt; Shefali Shah; Vijay Varma; Roshan Mathew
- Cinematography: Anil Mehta
- Edited by: Nitin Baid
- Music by: Songs: Vishal Bhardwaj; Mellow D Ajay Lobo; Score: Prashant Pillai
- Production companies: Red Chillies Entertainment; Eternal Sunshine Productions
- Distributed by: Netflix
- Release date: 5 August 2022
- Running time: 134 minutes
- Country: India
- Language: Hindi

Darlings is a 2022 Indian Hindi-language black comedy film co-written and directed by Jasmeet K. Reen, in her directorial debut, from a screenplay by Parveez Sheikh, and produced by Alia Bhatt (in her debut production), Gauri Khan and Gaurav Verma under the banners Red Chillies Entertainment and Eternal Sunshine Productions. The film stars Bhatt herself, Shefali Shah, Vijay Varma and Roshan Mathew in the lead roles.

Darlings was released on Netflix on 5 August 2022. It received positive reviews from the critics. The film received more than 10 million watching hours globally in its opening weekend, the highest for any non-English language original Indian film.

At the 2023 Filmfare OTT Awards, Darlings received 11 nominations, including Best Web Original Film, Best Director in a Web Original Film (Reen) and Best Actor in a Web Original Film (Varma), and won five awards, including Best Actress in a Web Original Film (Bhatt) and Best Supporting Actress in a Web Original Film (Shah).

== Plot ==
Hamza Shaikh is an alcoholic who regularly abuses his wife, Badrunissa "Badru" Shaikh (née Ansari). Hoping to reform him, Badru tries various methods to make him stop drinking, including urging him to start a family. Hamza is also embroiled in disputes with other residents over the renovation of their chawl. When Badru attends a residents’ meeting against his wishes, he assaults her again. Zulfi, a handyman in the chawl and a frequent visitor to Badru and her mother Shamshunissa "Shamshu" Ansari, witnesses the abuse and files a police complaint against Hamza. Although Hamza is arrested, he promises Badru he will stop drinking once they have a child, leading her to secure his release. However, the abuse continues.

Hamza later learns that his liver is severely damaged and that continued drinking could kill him. The same evening, Badru tells him she is pregnant, and he pretends to give up alcohol. At the same time, he becomes determined to discover who reported him to the police. When he learns that Zulfi filed the complaint and that Badru knew about it, he accuses them of having an affair. Despite Badru's pregnancy, Hamza violently attacks her and pushes her down a staircase, causing a miscarriage. Because he is sober at the time, Badru finally accepts that his cruelty is not caused solely by alcohol.

After recovering in hospital, Badru decides to treat Hamza as he treated her. She drugs him with sleeping pills, restrains him, and begins torturing him. When Hamza's employer visits to enquire about his absence, Badru and Shamshu initially claim he has gone to his village after his father's death before changing their story and saying he is ill. With help from Kasim, Shamshu obtains injections that Badru administers to Hamza.

While the women are out filing a false missing-person report, Hamza escapes by deceiving Zulfi. Soon afterwards, the police arrive to investigate the complaint and suspect Zulfi and Badru are involved romantically. To avoid Zulfi's arrest, he claims to love Shamshu, who confirms this by kissing him at the police station. Hamza also arrives there and accuses Badru and Shamshu of torturing him, but the police dismiss his claims. Badru, Shamshu, and Zulfi take him back home.

Shamshu and Zulfi then suggest killing Hamza by tying him to a railway track. Although they carry out the plan, Badru realises she is becoming like Hamza and frees him moments before a train passes. Furious, Hamza vows revenge, but is immediately struck and killed by the train.

On the journey home, Shamshu reveals that Badru's father had also abused her for years. With Kasim's help, she killed him, disposed of the body, and filed a missing-person report that was never solved. Shamshu reassures Badru that leaving Hamza was the right decision, as both men deserved punishment. Days later, Hamza's funeral is held, and Badru begins exploring the city independently, finally free and hopeful for a better future.

== Cast ==
- Alia Bhatt as Badrunissa "Badru" Ansari–Sheikh
- Shefali Shah as Shamshunissa "Shamshu" Ansari, Badru's mother
- Vijay Varma as Hamza Sheikh, Badru's Ex-husband
- Roshan Mathew as Zulfi, Shamshu's love interest
- Vikram Pratap as Abdul, medical store owner
- Rajesh Sharma as Kasim Kasai
- Vijay Maurya as Inspector Rajaram Tawde
- Santosh Juvekar as Janardhan Jadhav
- Kiran Karmarkar as Ticket Collector Damle, Hamza's boss
- Neha Kakkar as Herself (cameo appearance)

== Production ==
Pre-production started by early January 2021 and the film was planned for 2021 release, it was announced on behalf of Red Chillies Entertainment through a motion poster by Shah Rukh Khan on March 1, 2021. Set in Mumbai against the backdrop of a conservative lower-middle-class neighborhood, the film was hinted as a story of a quirky mother-daughter duo, sailing through circumstances with courage and love. Also, the motion poster, as a statutory warning translated to: "Offending women can be very injurious to your health". The film marks Alia Bhatt's first production, under the banner Eternal Sunshine Productions'. Apart from Bhatt playing the lead, Shefali Shah was roped in to play the parallel lead, followed by Roshan Mathew and Vijay Varma. Producer Gaurav Verma (Red Chillies Entertainment) mentioned: "Darlings is a move forward in a direction where they would want to collaborate with fresh talent and nurture their perspective." Talking about the casting, the debutante director Jasmeet K. Reen was quoted: "...we have a dream cast and the perfect ‘partners in crime’ if I can call them that. We couldn't have asked for anything more and now I can't wait to get on the floor!" Bhatt added that the film was a powerful story with a lot of humor and doses of dark comedy.

On her character preparation as 'Badru', Bhatt stated, it was picking up authentic sort of lingo of the area in Byculla, Mumbai which was a mixture of Urdu, English, Hindi and Marathi and heard in film dialogues. When she heard the script, she realised it was the time to produce films where she is a pivotal character and with this film, the genre shifted very quickly. Bhatt's character also had an essence from the fable The Scorpion and The Frog, where she added: "...little ambiguous for you to decide that who is the bicchu (scorpion) in the story", and she wanted the audience to actually play with and understand.

In an interview with Outlook Magazine, Mathew stated that the treatment for this role was a trial-and-error attempt, comfortable with his diction in Hindi, where he was clear with expectations of the role in few days of filming. Further interviews by Outlook Magazine wherein Varma hinted on the film story: "It will question what you like and don't like. It's just going to be a roller coaster. Relationships are shown in such a way that you won't know whose side you are going to be after 10 minutes."

In March 2021, Vishal Bhardwaj and Gulzar were onboarded to compose the original songs for the film By June, Bhatt announced she was preparing for the film and shared a photograph on Instagram to acknowledge the script reading.

=== Filming ===
Principal photography commenced with scenes featuring Bhatt and Varma in Mumbai on July 3, 2021. Bhatt shared her monochrome photos from the sets where she was seen sitting in her make-up van, rehearsing. Shah joined the cast in July but wrapped up filming for her scenes by August. September 7, 2021, Bhatt announced that filming was completed and shared a few behind the scenes stills and videos from the shoot.

== Marketing ==
In March 2021, a promotional video and motion logo of the film were released. A teaser poster featuring the official logo of the film was released as well.

In May 2022, Netflix India released a promotional announcement video for the film, featuring the cast. An announcement video revealing the release date for the teaser trailer was released in July 2022. On 5 July 2022, the film's official teaser and two posters were released. On 25 July 2022, the film's official trailer was released; a launch event was held in support of it.

== Music ==
Darlings

Soundtrack album by Vishal Bhardwaj Mellow D And Ajay Lobo
- Released: 2 August 2022
- Genre: Feature film soundtrack
- Length: 10:23
- Language: Hindi
- Label: Zee Music Company
- Producer: Prashant Pillai

Official audio
- Darlings - Full Album on YouTube

The film score is composed and produced by Prashant Pillai, while the soundtrack is written by Vishal Bhardwaj and Mellow D with lyrics by Gulzar and the latter.

Zee Music Company released the film's official three-track soundtrack album on 2 August 2022; the lead single "La Ilaaj", sung by Arijit Singh, Vishal Bhardwaj, and Debarpito Saha, was released some hours prior to it.

Track listing
No.	Title	Singer(s)	Length
1.	"La Ilaaj"	Arijit Singh, Vishal Bhardwaj, Debarpito Saha	4:24
2.	"Bhasad" (Music and Lyrics by Mellow D)	Mellow D	2:38
3.	"Pleaj!"	Mika Singh	3:21
Total length:			10:23

== Release ==
Darlings was released on 5 August 2022 on Netflix.

Following the acquisition of the film's rights by Netflix in February 2022, Red Chillies Entertainment announced that the film skipped theatrical release, and will digitally premiere as an original on the streaming platform. In July 2022, the film's release date was announced as 5 August 2022.

== Reception ==
=== Viewership ===
Darlings had the highest global opening for a non-English Indian film, with audiences spending more than 10 million hours watching it in its opening weekend, according to a statement released by the streaming service to the BBC.

=== Critical response ===
Darlings received positive reviews with praise towards the storyline and performances of the cast. On the review aggregator website Rotten Tomatoes, 70% of 20 critics' reviews are positive, with an average rating of 5.2/10.

Anupama Chopra of Film Companion wrote, "Darlings is very much its own film. There is generosity of spirit, which makes it eminently watchable". Pooja Biraia Jaiswal of The Week gave the film 4 out of 5 stars and wrote, "Except for a few instances here and there, Darlings feels as real as can get. You cannot but feel a part of the narrative yourself, when you root for the victim and feel agonised by her misery". Devesh Sharma of Filmfare gave the film 4 out of 5 stars and wrote, "The proceedings take on absurdist hues at times, but that sort of adds to the lure of the film. Watch Darlings for its message and for the fine acting displayed by the entire ensemble class". Tina Das of The Print rated the film 4 out of 5 stars and wrote "Darlings is a dark comedy par excellence, helmed by powerful performances by Alia Bhatt and Shefali Shah". Renuka Vyavahare of Times of India rated the film 3.5 out of 5 stars and wrote, "Darlings makes a compelling case study on domestic violence but it wouldn't be what it is, if it wasn't for Shefali and Alia. Both actresses speak through their eyes and make up for the dreary pace at times with their outstanding performances and chemistry". Sukanya Verma of Rediff gave the film 3.5 out of 5 stars and wrote, "Darlings is a well-rounded effort by Jasmeet K. Reen, supported by bold ideas and clever imagery". Pratikshya Mishra of The Quint awarded the film a score of 3.5 out of 5 stars and wrote, "Satire is a tough tool and Darlings wields it well. Even though sometimes the satire might not translate and the pacing might wobble, the pros heavily outweigh the cons". Film critic based at Bollywood Hungama gave the film 3.5 out of 5 stars and wrote, "Darlings is a hilarious entertainer and at the same time, it is also replete with some hard-hitting moments. The performances of Alia Bhatt, Shefali Shah and Vijay Varma are award-winning and serve as the icing on the cake". Fengyen Chiu of Mashable awarded the film a score of 3.5 out of 5 stars and wrote, "Domestic violence has been depicted in several Bollywood movie before, but Darlings has done it in a very creative and fresh way. Some aspects of the plot were indeed predictable, but some aspects also catch you off guard. All-in Alia Bhatt and Shefali Shah is definitely a must watch and will make you cry, angry, frustrated, and happy throughout the movie". Shilajit Mitra of The New Indian Express rated the film 3.5 out of 5 stars and wrote "Darlings entices and thrills, even if I wish the film had gone all out. I wish it had killed its darlings". Avinash Lohana of Pinkvilla rated the film 3.5 out of 5 stars and wrote "Darlings stays consistent even in the second half, and a few high points scattered periodically in the script keeps you hooked to the narrative. Watch it for the message and the performances".

Saibal Chatterjee of NDTV gave the film 3 out of 5 stars and wrote, "Darlings, which ploughs a dark furrow all its own while making judicious use of genre elements while shunning standard narrative tropes, is watchable all the way". Namrata Joshi of The National Herald wrote, "The cast of Darlings makes it a riveting watch. Varma is terrifying and Roshan Mathew as believable as the tender man. Ultimately, it's all in the hands of the forever solid & reliable Shah and Bhatt, matching her in every beat". Tushar Joshi of India Today awarded the film 3 stars (out of 5) and wrote, "Darlings is a film with a message. It touches upon the subject of domestic violence and addiction. Alia and Shefali's timing and Vijay Varma's acting save Darlings from becoming just another film with a social message". Bohni Bandyopadhyay of CNN-IBN gave the film 3 out of 5 stars and wrote, "Alia Bhatt, Shefali Shah and Vijay Varma's black comedy brings out laughs in tragic situations, but is ultimately a story about shattered hopes and dreams".

Nandini Ramnath of Scroll wrote, "Darlings has both laugh-out-loud comedy and suppressed giggles. Reen's control over the lengthier sequences, backed by Anil Mehta's sinuous camerawork and Nitin Baid's elegant editing, is strongest when Hamza drops the mask and lets the misogyny show". Shubhra Gupta of The Indian Express rated the film 2.5 out of 5 stars and wrote "Alia Bhatt, Vijay Varma, Shefali Shah and Roshan Mathew deliver excellent performances in a film that is aware of what it is. A few forced comic touches spoil the effect though". Anna M.M. Vetticad of Firstpost rated the film 2.5 out of 5 stars and wrote "This clarity and a certain energy are missing for the most part from the rest of Darlings. Full marks to the squad for risk-taking. On the execution front though, it barely gets a passing grade".

== Accolades ==
Award	Date of the ceremony	Category	Recipients	Result	Ref.
Filmfare OTT Awards (Web Original Film section)	26 November 2023	Best Film	Darlings	Nominated	
Filmfare OTT Awards (Web Original Film section)	26 November 2023	Best Director	Jasmeet K. Reen	Nominated	
Filmfare OTT Awards (Web Original Film section)	26 November 2023	Best Actor	Vijay Varma	Nominated	
Filmfare OTT Awards (Web Original Film section)	26 November 2023	Best Actress	Alia Bhatt	Won	
Filmfare OTT Awards (Web Original Film section)	26 November 2023	Best Supporting Actress	Shefali Shah	Won	
Filmfare OTT Awards (Web Original Film section)	26 November 2023	Best Story	Jasmeet K. Reen	Nominated	
Filmfare OTT Awards (Web Original Film section)	26 November 2023	Best Original Screenplay	Jasmeet K. Reen, Parveez Sheikh	Won	
Filmfare OTT Awards (Web Original Film section)	26 November 2023	Best Dialogue	Jasmeet K. Reen, Parveez Sheikh, Vijay Maurya	Nominated	
Filmfare OTT Awards (Web Original Film section)	26 November 2023	Best Editing	Nitin Baid	Won	
Filmfare OTT Awards (Web Original Film section)	26 November 2023	Best Background Score	Prashant Pillai	Nominated	
Filmfare OTT Awards (Web Original Film section)	26 November 2023	Best Sound Design	Anirban Sengupta	Won	
International Indian Film Academy Awards	26-27 May 2023	Best Actress	Alia Bhatt	Nominated	
International Indian Film Academy Awards	26-27 May 2023	Best Actress	Shefali Shah	Nominated	
International Indian Film Academy Awards	26-27 May 2023	Best Film	Darlings	Nominated	
International Indian Film Academy Awards	26-27 May 2023	Best Director	Jasmeet K. Reen	Nominated	
International Indian Film Academy Awards	26-27 May 2023	Best Story (Original)	Jasmeet K. Reen, Parveez Sheikh	Won	
Indian Film Festival of Melbourne	11 August 2023	Best Film	Darlings	Nominated	
Indian Film Festival of Melbourne	11 August 2023	Best Actress	Alia Bhatt	Nominated	
Indian Film Festival of Melbourne	11 August 2023	Best Actor	Vijay Varma	Nominated	
Indian Film Festival of Melbourne	11 August 2023	Equality in Cinema Award	Darlings	Won	
Zee Cine Awards	26 February 2023	Best Actress	Alia Bhatt	Won	
Zee Cine Awards	26 February 2023	Best Debut Director	Jasmeet K. Reen	Won	
News 18 Reel Awards	26 February 2023	Best Film (Jury)	Darlings	Won	
News 18 Reel Awards	26 February 2023	Best Director	Jasmeet K. Reen	Nominated	
News 18 Reel Awards	26 February 2023	Best Actress	Alia Bhatt	Nominated	
News 18 Reel Awards	26 February 2023	Best Supporting Actor	Vijay Varma	Nominated	
News 18 Reel Awards	26 February 2023	Best Supporting Actress	Shefali Shah	Nominated	
News 18 Reel Awards	26 February 2023	Best Performance in a Negative Role	Vijay Varma	Nominated	
Bollywood Hungama OTT India Fest Awards	20 October 2023	Best Feature Film	Darlings	Won	
Bollywood Hungama OTT India Fest Awards	20 October 2023	Best Director	Jasmeet K. Reen	Won	
Bollywood Hungama OTT India Fest Awards	20 October 2023	Best Film (People's Choice)	Darlings	Nominated	
Bollywood Hungama OTT India Fest Awards	20 October 2023	Best Actress	Alia Bhatt	Nominated	
Bollywood Hungama OTT India Fest Awards	20 October 2023	Best Actress (Popular)	Alia Bhatt	Nominated	
Bollywood Hungama OTT India Fest Awards	20 October 2023	Best Actor	Vijay Varma	Nominated	
Bollywood Hungama OTT India Fest Awards	20 October 2023	Best Actor (Popular)	Vijay Varma	Nominated	
Bollywood Hungama OTT India Fest Awards	20 October 2023	Best Supporting Actor	Shefali Shah	Nominated	
Bollywood Hungama OTT India Fest Awards	20 October 2023	Best Supporting Actor	Roshan Mathew	Nominated	
Bollywood Hungama OTT India Fest Awards	20 October 2023	Mould-Breaking Actor Of The Year	Shefali Shah	Nominated	
Bollywood Hungama OTT India Fest Awards	20 October 2023	Bankable Star Of The Year	Vijay Varma	Won	
Indian Telly Streaming Awards	19 July 2024	Best Hindi Film	Darlings	Won	
Indian Telly Streaming Awards	19 July 2024	Best Director (Hindi)	Jasmeet K. Reen	Nominated	
Indian Telly Streaming Awards	19 July 2024	Best Actress (Hindi)	Alia Bhatt	Nominated	
Indian Telly Streaming Awards	19 July 2024	Best Supporting Actress (Hindi)	Shefali Shah	Nominated	
Indian Telly Streaming Awards	19 July 2024	Best Actress in a Comedy Role (Hindi)	Alia Bhatt	Nominated	
Indian Telly Streaming Awards	19 July 2024	Best Actor in a Negative Role (Hindi)	Vijay Varma	Won	
FOI Online Awards	20 January 2023	Best Supporting Actor	Vijay Varma	Won	
FOI Online Awards	20 January 2023	Best Supporting Actress	Shefali Shah	Nominated	
FOI Online Awards	20 January 2023	Best Ensemble	Ensemble cast of Darlings	Nominated	
FOI Online Awards	20 January 2023	Best Dialogues	Jasmeet K. Reen, Parveez Sheikh, Vijay Maurya	Nominated	
FOI Online Awards	20 January 2023	Best Original Song	Vishal Bhardwaj, Gulzar for "La Ilaaj"	Nominated	
FOI Online Awards	20 January 2023	Best Lyricist	Gulzar for "La Ilaaj"	Nominated	
FOI Online Awards	20 January 2023	Special Jury Mention	Jasmeet K. Reen	Won	
Critic's Choice Awards	29 April 2023	Best Supporting Actress	Shefali Shah	Won	
Bollywood Film Journalists’ Awards	11 March 2023	Best Supporting Actor (Female)	Shefali Shah	Won	
Bollywood Film Journalists’ Awards	11 March 2023	Best Story (Original)	Jasmeet K. Reen, Parveez Sheikh, Vijay Maurya	Won	
Bollywood Film Journalists’ Awards	11 March 2023	Best Screenplay	Jasmeet K. Reen, Parveez Sheikh	Won	
Bollywood Film Journalists’ Awards	11 March 2023	Best Debutante Director	Jasmeet K. Reen	Won	
Digital Reinvent Awards	1 December 2023	Best Movie / Mini Series (Gold)	Darlings	Won	
Digital Reinvent Awards	1 December 2023	Best Direction (Gold)	Jasmeet K. Reen	Won	
Digital Reinvent Awards	1 December 2023	Lead Actress of the Year (Gold)	Alia Bhatt	Won	
Digital Reinvent Awards	1 December 2023	Supporting Actress of the Year (Gold)	Shefali Shah	Won	
Hitlist OTT Awards	17 March 2023	Best Film	Darlings	Nominated	
Hitlist OTT Awards	17 March 2023	Best Actress	Alia Bhatt	Nominated	
Hitlist OTT Awards	17 March 2023	Best Actor	Vijay Varma	Nominated	
Hitlist OTT Awards	17 March 2023	Best Supporting Actress	Shefali Shah	Nominated	
Hitlist OTT Awards	17 March 2023	Best Supporting Actor	Roshan Mathew	Nominated	
Bollywood Life Awards (OTT Film Section)	24 March 2023	Best Actress	Alia Bhatt	Nominated	
Bollywood Life Awards (OTT Film Section)	24 March 2023	Best Actor	Vijay Varma	Won	
Bollywood Life Awards (OTT Film Section)	24 March 2023	Best Supporting Actress	Shefali Shah	Won	
IWM Digital Awards	16 June 2023	Best Digital Film	Darlings	Won	
IWM Digital Awards	16 June 2023	Best Digital Film (Popular)	Darlings	Nominated	
IWM Digital Awards	16 June 2023	Best Actress	Alia Bhatt	Nominated	
IWM Digital Awards	16 June 2023	Best Supporting Actress	Shefali Shah	Nominated	
IWM Digital Awards	16 June 2023	Best Actor in a Negative Role	Vijay Varma	Won	
Femina Beauty Awards	14 December 2022	Rising Star Award	Vijay Varma	Won	
Bollywood Hungama Style Icons Awards	14 April 2023	Most Stylish Breakthrough Talent (Male)	Vijay Varma	Nominated	
Lions Gold Awards	14 October 2022	Best Actor in a Negative Role	Vijay Varma	Won	
OTTplay Awards	29 October 2023	Best Film	Darlings	Won	
OTTplay Awards	29 October 2023	Most Promising Actor	Roshan Mathew	Nominated	
