= Frédéric Fougea =

French author, director and producer

- Born: 4 March 1961 (age 65); Paris, France
- Occupations: Producer, director, screenwriter
- Notable work: Hanuman; L'Odyssée de l'espèce Wild France; Pourquoi j'ai (pas) mangé mon père Lord of the Animals
- Website: boreales.com

Frédéric Fougea is a French author, director and cinema and television producer, born on 4 March 1961 in Paris. He heads the production company Boréales, which he founded in 1987. His films are recognisable for their particular style, mixing documentary and fiction: constructed more like "narratives", than classic documentaries, they are often described as "tales". Their focus tends to be the relationship between humans and animals; exploring the animalistic qualities of man and the human traits of animals.

== Biography ==
From a young age, Fougea demonstrated a taste for travel and awareness for other cultures and civilisations. Alongside his traditional education (secondary school followed by Business School in Paris Sup de Co Paris) he set aside several months every year in order to travel: South America, Asia, a year in the United States of America and a year at the Indian Institute of Management Bangalore, one of the best business schools in the Asia-Pacific. He began his professional life with the establishment of a service-sector company in Equatorial Guinea, where he stayed for three years. On his return to Paris, he launched himself into audiovisual work: in 1987, with his mother and his brother Barthélémy Fougea, he launched the production company Boréales. Fougea's knowledge of ethology and anthropology, along with his appreciation for the oral tradition, legends and singular destinies, can all be found in his films.

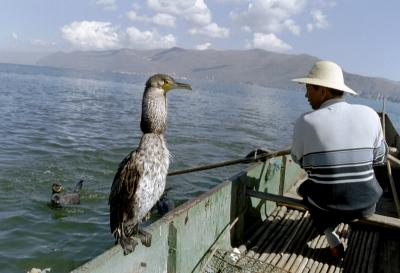
Cormorant fishing son lake Erhai of Yunnan in China

Between 1989 and 1999 he wrote and produced, with his company Boréales and Canal+, a series of thirteen animal films, entitled Les Seigneurs des animaux (The Lords of the Animals). The series was primarily concerned with the extraordinary relationships maintained between humans and animals in traditional societies. Il danse pour ses cormorans (1993), the most famous work of the series, tells the story of a Chinese fisherman who has trained his cormorants using ancestral techniques: they obey his voice and movements and fish for him. This anthology saw great success, internationally. Broadcast on over one hundred channels in every country, translated into forty languages, it brought back more than one hundred awards from festivals worldwide, among them an International Emmy Award and the Grand National Prize for Audiovisual Creation (1994).

At the same time, he produced, in collaboration with his brother Barthélémy Fougea, the collection Passions d’enfants (1996) that portrays young musical prodigies from all four corners of the globe, through the discovery of their world and their music. Frédéric Fougea has always been very drawn to music; he plays the saxophone and has been part of a jazz band, Messe Câline, for several years. Music also plays an important role in the films of Boréales. He entrusts Laurent Ferlet with the composition of the majority of his film music.

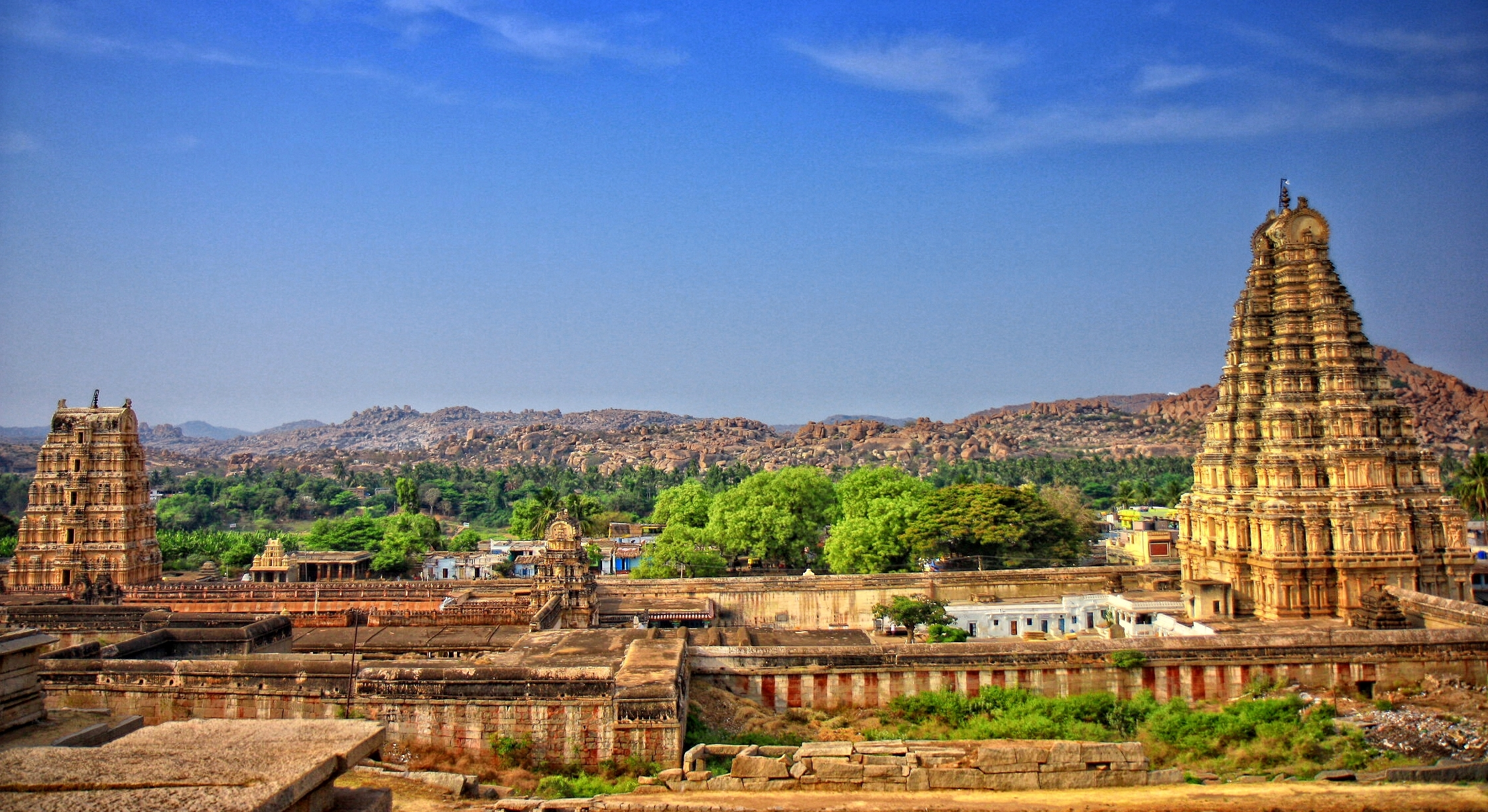
The city of Hampi in India, the «monkey kingdom», set of the film Hanuman

He made his first venture into cinema in 1998, in writing and directing the feature film Hanuman, in coproduction with Gaumont. The film depicts the remarkable friendship between a young Scotsman and a macaque who helps him to fight against cultural heritage traffic in India.

After having produced animal documentaries such as "The Monkey Prince" or "The Fabulous Adventure of Men and Animals", he wrote the narration for "A Species Odyssey" (2003), Jacques Malaterre's popular docu-fiction dedicated to the prehistoric. In its first broadcast on France 3, the docu-fiction was watched by 8.7 million viewers, 34.2% of the public; referred to by Le Parisien as a real "television event". Frédéric Fougea produced sequels to this film: "Homo sapiens" in 2005 and "The Rise of Man" in 2007. This trilogy was broadcast globally. It benefitted notably from the scientific expertise of paleoanthropologist Yves Coppens.

In the meantime, Frédéric Fougea wrote and produced the true story of a chimpanzee and its trainer in "Ham, Astrochimp #65" (2006), directed by Jérôme-Cecil Auffret. He encountered cinema again when he co-wrote the original screenplay with Michel Fessler for "Man to Man" (2005), the epic saga of two pygmies in Europe at the end of the 19th century, directed by Régis Wargnier, with Kristin Scott Thomas and Joseph Fiennes in the main roles.

In 2008, he began the collection Ce jour-là, tout a change, for France Télévisions. Created for a prime time audience, and made with substantial production value, the series aims to transport the viewer to behind the scenes of power and to relive all the intensity and drama of the key moments in our history. Following "L’Assassinat d’Henri IV "and "L’Évasion de Louis XVI", "L’Appel du 18 juin" was broadcast in commemoration of the 70th anniversary of the event.

In 2010, he organised an ambitious shoot in Japan: "Facing the Killer Volcano", a docu-fiction directed by Jérôme Cornuau that recounts the final days of Maurice and Katia Krafft on the slopes of Mount Unzen. This "super-production" blends exclusive archive footage and aerial views with reconstructed scenes with comedians.

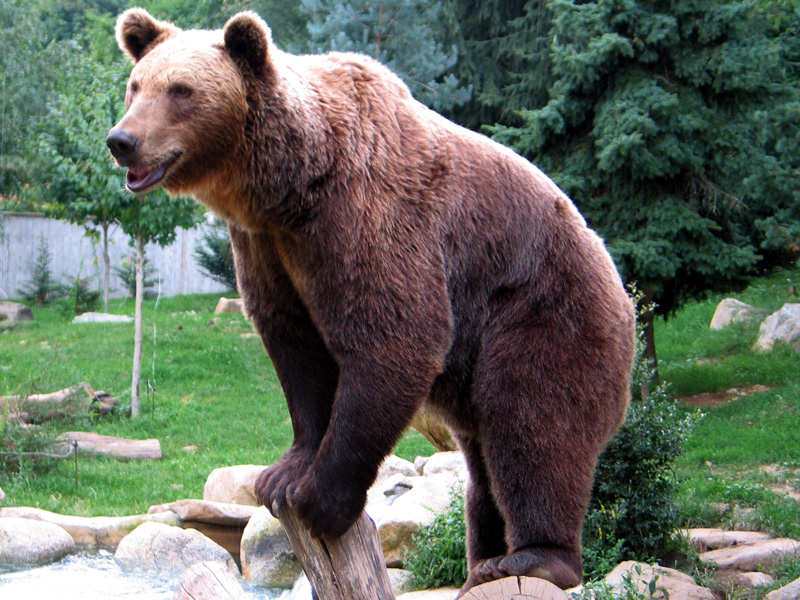
A brown bear in the Pyrenees

Broadcast 17 December 2013 on France 2, "Le Plus Beau Pays du monde" (Wild France), which he wrote, produced and directed in collaboration with Jacques Malaterre, is an immense success: it welcomed 6.5 million viewers (another 500,000 on replay) a 23.4% market share, France 2's best audience (outside sport and politics) in the year 2013, and voted France's favourite programme in 2013 (with a score of 8.9/10 on the Qualimat barometer for Harris Interactive).

L'Express described it as a "spectacular celebration of nature". The film is a journey to the heart of French wildlife, made up of little animal "stories" filmed as closely as possible: two stags who fight for the attentions of a group of does, two wolf cubs leaving their den for the first time, a family of geese featuring a rebellious daughter, the "fabulous destiny of a grouper who changes sex"...This "documentary event of international proportions" took three years of work and a budget of remarkable size for a documentary – more than 3 million euros.

The shooting was carried out having resorted to ultra perfected materials: drones, subaquatic cameras, helicopters, hot-air balloons, flights in Microlights. It is the actor Guillaume de Tonquédec who lends his voice to the narration of the film. All these ingredients have permitted the genre of animal documentary to raise itself to a place rarely reached in prime time.

Frédéric Fougea has developed a second opus for the documentary.

In 2015, Why I Did (Not) Eat My Father" will be released, which Fougea co-authored and co-directed with Jamel Debbouze, and co-produced with Pathé. It’s an animated, comedy adaption of Roy Lewis’ book "Why I Did (not) Eat my Father" (1960), a project that Fougea has had in mind since 1991. The film took at least three years of writing and five years of directing. It is entirely filmed in motion capture. This process has helped to "resuscitate" the film for actor Louis de Funès, who served as the model for the character of Vladimir.

In 2016, he will direct "First Man", a docu-fiction coproduced by Boréales and Nilaya Productions, which recounts the adventure of evolution through the saga of a single family. This new story of our origins will be brought to light thanks to recent scientific discoveries and new imaging technology. For his capacity for innovation, Frédéric Fougea has been listed by Realscreen magazine among the 100 most influential producers in the world. His singular style, in the line of Robert Flaherty, sets him apart from other documentary film makers: "he is a storyteller" (Realscreen). Since the 1990s, he has taken an opposite stance to the "factual", Anglo-Saxon school of thought, which dominates the genre of documentary. His documentary "tales" will finally find an audience and recognition. He is a nephew of Jean-Pierre Fougea and married to actress, producer and screenwriter Nathalie Auffret.

== Filmography ==
Director

- 1998 : Hanuman
- 1990 : Le Joueur de singes
- 1991 : Le Seigneur des aigles
- 1993 : Il danse pour ses cormorans
- 1991 : Le Cochon de Gaston
- 2001 : La fabuleuse histoire des hommes et des animaux
- 2003 : Le fils du roi singe
- 2013 : Le Plus Beau pays du monde
- 2014 : en: Natural World (TV series). France: The Wild Side
- 2015 : Le Plus Beau Pays du Monde Opus 2

Screenwriter

Cinema

- 1998 : Hanuman
- 2005 : Man to Man
- 2015 : Pourquoi j'ai (pas) mangé mon père

Television

- 1992 : Les Seigneurs des animaux
- 2003 : A Species Odyssey (A Species Odyssey)
- 2005 : Homo sapiens
- 2007 : Ham, un chimpanzé dans l'espace
- 2007 : Le Sacre de l'homme
- 2012 : Dimanche à la ferme
- 2013 : Le Plus Beau pays du monde
- 2015 : Le Plus Beau Pays du Monde Opus 2
- 2019 : Le Plus Beau Pays du Monde Opus 3 Sanctuaire

Producer

Cinema

- 1998 : Hanuman
- 2015 : Pourquoi j'ai (pas) mangé mon père

Television

- 1992 : Les Seigneurs des animaux
- 2000 : Yéti, le cri de l'homme des neiges
- 2001 : La fabuleuse histoire des hommes et des animaux
- 2005 : Homo sapiens
- 2007 : Ham, un chimpanzé dans l'espace
- 2007 : Le Sacre de l'homme
- 2009 : L'Assassinat d'Henri IV
- 2010 : L'évasion de Louis XVI
- 2010 : L'appel du 18 juin
- 2011 : Face au volcan tueur
- 2012 : Dimanche à la ferme
- 2013 : Le Plus Beau pays du monde
- 2015 : Le Plus Beau Pays du Monde Opus 2
- 2019 : Le Plus Beau Pays du Monde Opus 3 Sanctuaire
