= Tillotama Shome =

Indian actress

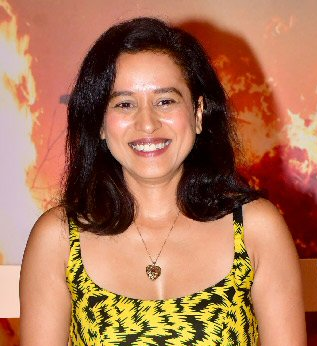
- Shome in 2025
- Born: 25 June 1979 (age 47); Kolkata, West Bengal, India
- Occupation: Actress
- Spouse: Kunal Ross (m. 2015)

Tillotama Shome (Bengali pronunciation: [tilotːɔma ʃom]; born 25 June 1979) is an Indian actress known primarily for her work in independent films. She began acting with a supporting role in Mira Nair's film Monsoon Wedding (2001). She won the Filmfare Critics Award for Best Actress for playing the lead role of a housemaid in the drama film Sir (2018). Shome has also starred in the films A Death in the Gunj (2017) and Lust Stories 2 (2023), as well as the television series Delhi Crime (2022), The Night Manager (2023), and Paatal Lok (2025).

== Early life ==
Shome was born in Bengali Family in Kolkata to Anupam and Baisakhi Shome. Shome grew up all over India since her father was with the Indian Air Force.

== Career ==
Shome went to Delhi's Lady Shri Ram College and joined Arvind Gaur's Asmita theatre group. She moved to New York in the autumn of 2004 for a master's program in educational theatre at New York University, where she remained until visiting Mumbai on holiday in February 2008. Thereafter, she took up residence in Mumbai and after completing some outstanding projects in New York, she returned to India in May 2008. In New York, she also taught theatre to murder convicts at a high security US prison.

She made her film debut as Alice in Mira Nair's feature film Monsoon Wedding, and played Deepa in Shadows of Time (Schatten der Zeit), directed by Florian Gallenberger. She played a nun in the Australian film The Waiting City by Claire McCarthy. Italo Spinelli's Gangor, based on Mahashweta Devi's novel, had her play a social worker. She also worked in Qaushiq Mukherjee's Tasher Desh. She played Mrs. Ahmadi in the Hindi political thriller film Shanghai directed by Dibakar Banerjee. About her performance in Shanghai, Rediff wrote "Shome created one of this year's most heartbreaking performances in a Hindi film".

Her other roles have included Lara in Little Box of Sweets (directed by Meneka Das), Jaya in Long After (short film, directed by Afia Nathaniel) and Miraal in Butterfly (directed by Tanuj Chopra).

Her performance as a girl who is raised as a boy in Qissa won her the best actress title in the New Horizons Competition of the seventh Abu Dhabi Film Festival (ADFF). She shared the title with Norwegian actress Julia Wildschutt.

== Personal life ==
Shome is married to Kunal Ross. Her husband Kunal is the son of Nita Ross (née Bhaduri), thus making him the nephew of Jaya Bachchan, and hence making her the niece-in-law of Jaya and Amitabh Bachchan.

== Filmography ==
=== Films ===
Year	Title	Role	Language	Notes
2001	Monsoon Wedding	Alice	Hindi, English	
2003	Butterfly	Miraal	English	Short film
2004	Shadows of Time	Deepa	Bengali	
2006	Long After	Jaya	English	Short film
2006	Little Box of Sweets	Lara	English	
2009	Boond	Jeevni	Hindi	Short film
2009	The Waiting City	Sister Tessila	English	
2009	Zamir and Preeti: A Love Story	Preeti	English	Short film
2009	Clap Clap	Leena	English	Short film
2010	Gangor	Medha	English, Bengali	
2011	Turning 30	Malini Roy	Hindi	
2012	Shanghai	Aruna Ahmedi	Hindi	
2012	Tasher Desh	Queen	Bengali	
2013	Sahasi Chori	Radha	Nepali	Short film
2013	Aatma	Vaishali Sinha	Hindi	
2013	Qissa: The Tale of a Lonely Ghost	Kanwar	Punjabi	
2014	The Letters	Kavita Singh	English	
2014	Sold	Bimla	English	
2014	Children of War	Bhitika	Hindi	
2014	Nayantara's Necklace	Alka	Hindi	Short film
2015	Ludo	Shaman	Bengali	
2016	Budhia Singh – Born to Run	Sukanti	Hindi	
2017	A Death in the Gunj	Bonnie Bakshi	English, Hindi, Bengali	
2017	Hindi Medium	Education Consultant	Hindi	
2017	The Song of Scorpions	Lady of The Night	Hindi	
2017	Union Leader	Geeta	Hindi	
2017	Kadvi Hawa	Parvati	Hindi	
2018	Manto	Prostitute	Hindi	
2018	Sir	Ratna	Hindi, Marathi	
2019	India's Got Colour	Herself	Hindi	Music video
2019	Raahgir – The Wayfarers	Nathuni	Hindi	
2020	Dheet Patangey	Devi	Hindi	
2020	Angrezi Medium	Immigration Consultant	Hindi	
2020	Chintu Ka Birthday	Sudha Tiwary	Hindi	
2021	Deep6	Mitul	Bengali	
2023	Lust Stories 2	Ishita	Hindi	Segment: The Mirror
2024	The Fable	Radha	Hindi	
2025	Shadowbox	Maya	Bengali	
2026	Ikka	Public Prosecutor Madhura Banerjee	Hindi	Netflix film

=== Television ===
Year	Title	Role	Language	Notes
2010	Futurestates	Syama	English	Episode: Pia
2014	Monsoon Baby	Shanti	German	TV Movie
2016	Love Shots	Nidhi	Hindi	Episode: Fired
2020	Mentalhood	Preeti	Hindi	10 episodes
2022	Delhi Crime	Lata Solanki/Karishma	Hindi	Season 2; 5 episodes
2023	The Night Manager	Lipika Saikia Rao	Hindi	7 episodes
2023	Tooth Pari: When Love Bites	Meera	Hindi	8 episodes
2024	Kota Factory: Season 3	Pooja Agarwal (Pooja Didi)	Hindi	5 episodes
2024	Tribhuvan Mishra: CA Topper	Bindi Jain	Hindi	9 episodes
2025	Paatal Lok	Meghna Barua	Hindi, Nagamese	Season 2; 8 episodes
2025	Saare Jahan Se Accha	Mohini, Vishnu's wife	Hindi	6 episodes

== Awards and nominations ==
Year	Award	Nominated work	Category	Result	Ref.
2018	Filmfare Awards	A Death in the Gunj	Best Supporting Actress	Nominated	
2021	Filmfare Awards	Sir	Best Actress (Critics)	Won	
2023	Filmfare OTT Awards	The Night Manager	Best Supporting Actress – Drama	Nominated	
2023	Filmfare OTT Awards	Delhi Crime	Best Supporting Actress – Drama	Won	
2018	Indian Film Festival of Melbourne	Sir	Best Actress	Nominated	
2023	Indian Film Festival of Melbourne	Delhi Crime	Best Actress in a Series	Nominated	
