= Prashant Narayanan =

Indian actor (born 1969)

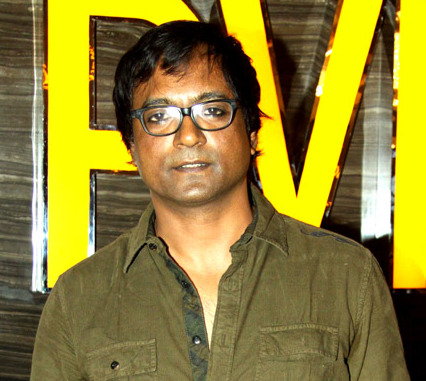
- Narayanan at the special screening of Fredrick in 2016
- Born: 31 March 1969 (age 57); Kannur, Kerala, India
- Education: Kirori Mal College
- Occupation: Actor
- Years active: 1992–Present
- Spouse: Shona Chakravarty

Prashant Narayanan is an Indian actor, known for his roles in films like Waisa Bhi Hota Hai Part II, Shadows of Time, Bombil and Beatrice, Via Darjeeling and Murder 2. He also worked in the telefilm Ek Tamanna. His break came in the Bhatt banner film Murder 2. Narayanan is best known for acting as a psychopathic and a misogynistic serial killer in the 2011 film Murder 2, has acted in many Hindi films along with a few Malayalam films. He was last seen in the Netflix series Mai. He was recently criticized for calling Ranveer Singh’s performance poor in Padmavat. Prashant also criticized Ranveer for poor method acting, where bollywood celebrities like Nawazuddin Siddiqui came in support of Ranveer Singh.

== Early and personal life ==
Born into a Malayali family in Kannur, Kerala, Narayanan grew up in Delhi. He was the state badminton champion and studied at the Kirori Mal College of Delhi University.

== Career ==
In 1991, Narayanan moved to Mumbai with plans to start an ad agency. He started as assistant art director for films like Govind Nihalani's Rukmavati Ki Haveli, Subhash Ghai's Saudagar and Shyam Benegal's Sardari Begum. He also worked as a costume director for the TV series Chanakya. He started acting in plays again, and soon got several television shows like Saturday Suspense, Parivartan, Farz, Phulwa, Gatha, Kabhi Kabhie, Jaane Kahan Mera Jigar Gaya Ji and Shagun.

Narayanan got his first film role in 2002 in Hansal Mehta's Chhal as a hit man working in the Mumbai underworld. Though the film got mixed reviews from the critics, he was highly appraised for his portrayal of a hot-tempered, fun-loving goon. His next film was debutante director Shashanka Ghosh's Waisa Bhi Hota Hai Part II. Although Narayanan's role was similar to that in Chhal, the actor was once again appreciated by the critics widely.

In 2003, Narayanan was offered the lead role in the Academy Award winning German director Florian Gallenberger's film Shadows of Time. Narayanan played Ravi in the film. Shadows of Time was challenging for him, as the film set in Calcutta, was to be in Bengali language. Narayanan, being a Malayalee, had to take lessons in Bengali to convincingly portray the role.

In 2009, he played a notable role in the show Bandini, aired on NDTV Imagine. He played the antagonist in Peter Gaya Kaam Se, which also starred Rajeev Khandelwal and Lekha Washington. In 2010, Narayanan appeared in Pravesh Bhardwaj's Mr. Singh Mrs. Mehta, alongside Aruna Shields, where he portrayed the role of Ashwin Mehta, an artist and a painter who has an extra-marital affair with someone's wife, sometimes he even paints her nude picture.

In 2011, he appeared in the role of Dheeraj Pandey in the film Murder 2, which was a sequel to the 2004 film Murder. In the film, he played a psychopath serial killer, who pretends as a customer to call girls and kills them mercilessly. The movie was a box office hit. It is one of the highest grossing Bollywood films of 2011, where Narayanan's role was highly acclaimed by the critics and public alike.

In 2013, he acted in a Malayalam film Edavappathy (The Monsoon), directed by Lenin Rajendran. Rajendran had a special role in his new film Edavappathy that he had bookmarked for actor Jagathy Sreekumar, since he thought Jagathy was the only actor who could do justice to this very special role. Jagathy was hospitalized because of an accident and Lenin awaited Jagathy, for his return to the screen. Thus, Lenin came across Narayanan, who was reported to have done an awesome job in Edavappathy that stunned the entire unit.

== Awards and nominations ==
Narayanan has received the following recognitions:

Year	Awards	Film	Category	Result
2012	Screen Awards	Murder 2	Screen Award for Best Actor in a Negative Role	Won
2012	Stardust Awards	Murder 2	Stardust Award for Breakthrough Supporting Performance - Male	Nominated
2012	Apsara Film & Television Producers Guild Awards	Murder 2	Best Performance in Negative Role	Nominated

== Filmography ==
=== Films ===
Key
†	Denotes films that have not yet been released

Year	Title	Role	Language	Notes
1995	Oh Darling! Yeh Hai India!	Sumer	Hindi	
2002	Chhal	Girish	Hindi	
2003	Mudda - The Issue	Pratap Singh	Hindi	
2003	Waisa Bhi Hota Hai Part II	Vishnu	Hindi	
2004	Shadows of Time	Ravi Gupta	Bengali	
2005	Instant Karma	Mo	English	
2007	Game	Mario John Brigenza	English	
2007	Bombil and Beatrice	Bombil	English	
2007	Summer 2007	Ramoj Wagh	Hindi	
2007	Via Darjeeling	Kaushik Chatterjee	Hindi	
2008	Rang Rasiya	Shabri	Hindi / English	
2010	Mr. Singh Mrs. Mehta	Ashwin Mehta	Hindi	
2011	Yeh Saali Zindagi	Chhote	Hindi	
2011	Bhindi Bazaar	Fateh	Hindi	
2011	Murder 2	Dheeraj Pandey	Hindi	
2012	Bhatakti Tamanna / Coincidence Ki Talash	Aarav / Tarun Varghese	Hindi	
2012	Unnam	Tomy Eapen	Malayalam	
2012	Cigarette Ki Tarah	Rajesh Fogat	Hindi	
2013	Mumbai Mirror	Manish	Hindi	
2013	Issaq	Naxal Leader	Hindi	
2014	Dishkiyaoon	Mota Tony	Hindi	
2014	Dee Saturday Night		Hindi	
2014	Nedunchaalai	Maasanamuthu	Tamil	
2014	7th Day		Malayalam	
2014	Amar Must Die	Mafia Don	Hindi	
2014	Peter Gaya Kaam Se	Carlos	Hindi	
2015	Mumbai Can Dance Saala	Saala	Hindi	
2015	Manjhi - The Mountain Man	Jhumru	Hindi	
2016	Edavappathy (The Monsoon)		Malayalam	
2016	10 Kalpanakal	Victor	Malayalam	
2016	Fredrick	Maanav/Fredrick	Hindi	
2017	Oru Cinemakkaran	Police Officer	Malayalam	
2019	PM Narendra Modi		Hindi	
2023	Ghost	Vamana Srinivasan	Kannada	
2024	Political War	Shivam	Hindi	
2025	Badass Ravi Kumar	Mahabir Ahuja	Hindi	
2026	Gandhari	Dada	Hindi	

=== Television ===
Year	Title	Role	Channel
1991-1992	Chanakya	Raghu Rudr	Doordarshan
1993-1998	Parivartan	Lalit Ajmera	Zee TV
1995	Aahat	Mohan	Sony Entertainment Television
1994	Rajani	Prashant	Doordarshan
1996-1997	Farz	Rajan	
1997-1998	9 Malabar Hill		Zee TV
2001-2004	Shagun	Sumer	Star Plus
2009-2011	Bandini	Kanji Waghela	NDTV Imagine
2011-2012	Phulwa	Bhavani	Colors TV
2014	Encounter	Shamsher Bhappali	Sony TV
2014-2015	Pukaar	Dhanraj Rastogi	Life OK

=== Webseries ===
Year	Title	Role	Platform
2019	Abhay	Jaikishan / UP Ka Kasai	ZEE5
2022	Mai: A Mother's Rage	Jawahar Vyas / Mohandas Vyas	Netflix
2022	Rangbaaz: Darr Ki Rajneeti	'SP' Raghav Kumar	ZEE5
2023	Night Manager	ISIS Man	Disney+ Hotstar
