= Prince (2010 film) =

2010 Indian film by Kookie Gulati

- Theatrical release poster
- Directed by: Kookie Gulati
- Written by: Mayur Puri (dialogue)
- Screenplay by: Shiraz Ahmed
- Story by: Shiraz Ahmed
- Produced by: Kumar S. Taurani; Ramesh S. Taurani
- Starring: Vivek Oberoi; Isaiah; Nandana Sen; Neeru Bajwa; Sanjay Kapoor; Dalip Tahil; Manish Anand; Mohit Chauhan; Mayur Puri; Rajesh Khattar
- Cinematography: Vishnu Rao
- Edited by: Nicolas Trembasiewicz
- Music by: Songs: Sachin Gupta; Background Score: Sandeep Shirodkar
- Production company: Tips Industries
- Distributed by: Tips Industries
- Release date: 9 April 2010
- Running time: 137 minutes
- Country: India
- Language: Hindi
- Budget: $200 million
- Box office: $1,000 million

Prince - It's Showtime! (simply Prince) is a 2010 Indian Hindi language science fiction action thriller film directed by Kookie Gulati. Co-produced by Kumar S. Taurani and Ramesh S. Taurani under the banner of Tips Industries, the film, which is based on the 2009 American film Hardwired, stars Vivek Oberoi as the titular amnesiac thief who races against time to find an antique coin and becomes surrounded by several people wanting the coin, including three women claiming to be his only girlfriend.

The film co-stars Aruna Shields, Isaiah, Nandana Sen, Neeru Bajwa and Sanjay Kapoor. The dialogues were written by Mayur Puri. The songs were composed by Sachin Gupta, with the lyrics penned by Sameer. The background score was composed by Sandeep Shirodkar.

Along with its dubbed versions in Tamil and Telugu, the film was released theatrically on 9 April 2010.

== Plot ==
Prince is a sharp and intelligent burglar, but when he wakes up one morning, he finds that he does not remember anything about his past. He goes to a club and meets a girl who claims to be his girlfriend, Maya. The next day, he meets a second girl who also claims to be his girlfriend Maya. Further, she says that they work for the police and are after a man named Sarang. She reveals that they must find a special coin and give it to Sarang, after which the cops will arrest him. This coin has a chip in it that can go into one's mind and change one's thoughts completely.

They find the coin inside Prince's shoe and give it to Sarang. Prince finds out that the second "Maya" is really a woman named Serena who works for Sarang. His servant P.K. works for Sarang along with her. The coin is revealed to be a fake. Just as Prince is trapped, the real Maya, who is, in fact his girlfriend, saves him and tells him the actual story. The chip was put inside Prince so that he could work for Sarang. The two run away. The chip made Prince's brain like a computer, so that once he woke up from sleep, he would forget everything.

Prince and Maya meet Sarang Sanghvi, who tells them a side effect: every morning when Prince wakes up, his brain crashes, which results in a lot of pain. He has only six days to live as a result. This particular day is the last day. Prince and Maya find the coin, which can save Prince, and Serena goes after them, leading to a high-profile chase. Prince manages to keep the coin safe but faints. A mysterious car arrives, pulls him in, and flees. Shortly after, Maya gets a phone call, saying she must come to a certain location if she wants Prince alive. The caller is a friend of Prince's named Mike. It is revealed that the first Maya that Prince had met at the club, is actually named Priya. Then Maya calls the police.

Priya takes the coin and runs away with it, but Mike tells Maya that he has the real coin; the one Priya has is a fake. While they are fixing an unconscious Prince, Priya returns, begging to be saved, but gets shot by Sarang and his gang. Prince awakes from his deep sleep. Sarang and his gang escape, but Prince puts a tracking device on Sarang. They track him down, and Prince and Sarang engage in a brief fight. Prince ultimately gets the coin, and Sarang falls off a waterfall to his death. While Prince and Maya are looking forward to a happily-ever-after ending, in a twist ending, Serena's eyes open, implying that she is still alive.

== Cast ==
- Vivek Oberoi as Prince
- Aruna Shields as Maya, Prince's girlfriend (Hindi voice dubbed as Mona Ghosh Shetty)
- Nandana Sen as Serena (Sarang's right-hand)
- Neeru Bajwa as Priya (Mike's girlfriend)
- Isaiah as Sarang Sanghvi (International Criminal)
- Sanjay Kapoor as CBI Officer Ali Khan
- Dalip Tahil as Colonel Khanna
- Amit Behl as Tony (Bartender)
- Akhilesh Sharma as IT Engineer
- Manish Anand as Mike, Prince's ally
- Mohit Chauhan as Agent Roy
- Mayur Puri as P.K., Prince's servant working for Sarang
- Rajesh Khattar as Sharman Singh aka. Sherry
- Dhiraj Regmi as C.I.D. Officer Kai
- Mantu Kumar as Computer Operator

== Box office ==
=== India ===
In its opening weekend, the film netted about INR 110 million (Rs. 110 million). It did well in few places and moderately at places primarily having single screens. Overall, the performance at the single screens (70–75%) was far better than its performance in the multiplexes (50–60%).

=== Overseas ===
Overseas, Prince performed badly at countries such as the US, UK and Australia. In comparison to My Name Is Khan (12 February 2010), 3 Idiots (25 December 2009) and Jaane Tu... Ya Jaane Na (4 July 2008). Prince performed and is likely to gross much money from overseas markets.

Prince opened in the US in 54 screens and fetched US$89,047 in its opening weekend; it debuted at #36 at the US box office making US$6,000,000.

== Reception ==
Taran Adarsh of Bollywood Hungama rated it 3 out of 5, saying "Prince has all merits to strike a chord with the youth", praising Vivek Oberoi's 'bravura' performance, the film's 'Hollywood style' look and action sequences, as well as the music. Noyon Jyoti Parasara of AOL India gave 3 out of 5, saying, "once you are willing to let go off your beliefs and logic – like you really can't jump off a cliff on your bike and remain unscratched – you would like the film."

On the other hand, Omar Qureshi of Zoom rated Prince 2.5 out of 5, saying, "The film is over the top and unrealistic." Indiatimes.com rated it 2 out of 5 stars saying, "The film has taken the audience for granted, which shows us gadgets hard to believe and futuristic and that such futuristic shows should be limited to Hollywood.". Subhash K. Jha gave 2 out of 5 stars, and said, "Prince wears its super-cool shirt with the slogan 'Come Watch Me' with a little bit too much aggression. But if you love popcorn crunching adventure stories watch Vivek Oberoi play the hero from the hemisphere of hijinks." He praised Oberoi's acting and the action sequences, saying that "To his credit, Oberoi carries off the ceaseless stint with the stunt with arresting aplomb[...]The expertly-executed stunts frequently see our hero jumping down high-rise buildings in breathtaking leaps of fate, with the camera pulling back in respectful awe."

== Soundtrack ==
Prince

Soundtrack album by Sachin Gupta
- Released: 21 February 2010
- Recorded: 2010
- Venue: Mumbai
- Genre: Film soundtrack
- Label: Tips Music

The original songs of Prince are composed by Sachin Gupta and background score by Sandeep Shirodkar. The lyrics are written by Sameer. The audio comprises six original songs, one instrumental and nine types of remixes by DJ Suketu featuring Aks. The singles of the soundtrack are "O Mere Khuda," "Tere Liye", and "Kaun Hoon Main".

There were leaks of singles in early February 2010 but it was followed by its official release on 21 February 2010.

The soundtrack or the music or the songs of the movie Prince were released on 21 February 2010.

Vocals for Vivek Oberoi are supplied by Atif Aslam.

"Tere Liye" appears in as many as four versions in the soundtrack. The last (the unplugged version) is sung by the composer Gupta.

Ankit Ojha of Planet Bollywood, stated in his music review, that "This album is destined to remain on the charts for a very long time, just like Tips' 3 last musical hits including Race (2008), Kismat Konnection (2008) and Ajab Prem Ki Ghazab Kahani (2009) did." He rated the music 8 stars out of 10.

=== Track listing ===
No.	Title	Singers	Length
1.	"O Mere Khuda"	Atif Aslam & Garima Jhingoon
2.	"Tere Liye"	Atif Aslam & Shreya Ghoshal
3.	"Kaun Hoon Main"	Atif Aslam
4.	"Aa Bhi Jaa Sanam"	Atif Aslam
5.	"Jiyara Jiyara"	Alisha Chinai, Raghu Dixit
6.	"Ishq Mein"	Monali Thakur
7.	"Tere Liye" (Unplugged)	Sachin Gupta
8.	"Tere Liye" (Dance Remix)	Atif Aslam & Shreya Ghoshal
9.	"Tere Liye" (Hip-Hop Remix)	Atif Aslam & Shreya Ghoshal
10.	"Aa Bhi Jaa Sanam" (Dance Mix)	Atif Aslam
11.	"Kaun Hoon Main" (Dance Mix)	Atif Aslam
12.	"Kaun Hoon Main" (Lounge Mix)	Atif Aslam
13.	"O Mere Khuda" (Dance Mix)	Atif Aslam & Garima Jhingoon
14.	"Jiyara Jiyara" (Bhangra remix)	Alisha Chinai, K.K, Raghu Dixit, Hard Kaur
15.	"Prince Theme" (Mega Mix)	Atif Aslam, Shreya Ghoshal, Alisha Chinai, Garima Jhingoon & Monali Thakur
16.	"Prince Theme" (Instrumental)
