= Shadows of Time =

- Directed by: Florian Gallenberger
- Written by: Florian Gallenberger
- Produced by: Helmut Dietl; Norbert Preuss
- Starring: Prashant Narayanan; Tannishtha Chatterjee; Irrfan Khan; Tillotama Shome; Soumitra Chatterjee
- Cinematography: Jürgen Jürges
- Edited by: Hansjörg Weißbrich
- Music by: Gert Wilden Jr.
- Distributed by: Constantin Film
- Release dates: 12 September 2004 (Toronto); 12 May 2005
- Running time: 122 minutes
- Country: Germany
- Language: Bengali
- Box office: $41,874

Shadows of Time (German: Schatten der Zeit, Bangla: সময়ের প্রতিচ্ছবি) is a 2004 Bengali language German romance film directed by Florian Gallenberger in his directorial debut. Filmed in Calcutta, India, the film stars Prashant Narayanan, Tannishtha Chatterjee, Irrfan Khan and Tillotama Shome. It marks Khan's debut in Bengali cinema.

== Plot ==
The film opens with the elderly Ravi driving to an abandoned carpet factory in West Bengal. As he explores the remains of the factory, he finds his bed and other memoirs. The story reverts to the early 1940s in pre-independent India, with Ravi Gupta a child laborer in the factory, saving up his earnings so that he can leave the factory one day. Ravi befriends a girl of his own age, Masha, who's been sold to the factory by her father. When the obstinate factory manager tries to sell Masha to a rich man, Ravi unsuccessfully tries to match the bid. He subsequently gives her the money to escape, and as they part Masha promises to wait for Ravi at every full moon at Calcutta's great Kali temple.

Years later, the adult Ravi leaves the factory and sets out for Calcutta. He begins working for an old carpet seller and his granddaughter, Deepa. Masha has become a professional courtesan in Calcutta, romanced by a customs officer, Yani Mishra. Masha goes to the Shiva temple every full moon to possibly meet Ravi, who himself is trying to search for her. They almost meet one night, but are separated by the chance arrival of Deepa, who Masha thinks is Ravi's wife. Masha decides to marry Yani, and Ravi, thinking Masha has forgotten him, finally marries Deepa.

Ravi renovates the carpet shop and becomes an Exporter of carpets. A few years later, he meets Yani, who had once bought a carpet from him to impress Masha. Yani invites him and Deepa to a dinner party, where Ravi and Masha finally meet. Perplexed at first, their mutual attraction gradually turns into an extra-marital affair. When Yani announces that he has been transferred to Kerala, Masha gets scared at the thought of losing Ravi again and asks him to take some action. Confused, Ravi arrives at the railway station but lets her down. The two leave, with Yani telling Ravi, just before boarding, that Masha is pregnant.

A few years later, Yani visits Ravi and tells him that Masha delivered a boy in Kerala, but he discovered that it was not his, so he expelled them from his house. Ravi goes to the brothels, where he finds Masha and their son, but she refuses to see him. Ravi departs, sliding a packet full of money into her room before leaving.

The film comes to the present time where elderly Ravi is at the factory. He hears a little girl and her grandmother in the courtyard. He starts talking to them and finds out that the grandmother is Masha, who is still waiting for Ravi to come; because this was the place where they first met. Ravi is astounded, but in the end he decides to walk away. The little girl asks her grandmother who he was, to which she replies, "It was Ravi".

== Cast ==
- Prashant Narayanan as Ravi Gupta
- Tannishtha Chatterjee as Masha
- Tillotama Shome as Deepa
- Irrfan Khan as Yani Mishra
- Sikandar Agarwal as Young Ravi
- Tumpa Das as Young Masha
- Soumitra Chatterjee as Old Ravi
- Sova Sen as Old Masha
- Biplab Dasgupta as the Factory Manager
- Satya Bandopadhyaya as Deepa's grandfather

== Production ==
Gallenberger first came to India in April 2001 for research and spent around a year and a half researching and understanding life. He was moved by a radio interview he had earlier heard, of a little girl working as a laborer in an Indian carpet factory which prompted him to leave for India and research a story. He set his story in Calcutta, which had earlier attracted renowned filmmakers from all over the world like Jean Renoir, Roberto Rossellini, Louis Malle and Roland Joffe to come and make a film in the city. But Gallenberger decided that unlike the others, he was going to make it in Bengali language rather than in English or his native German. The film was partly funded by the German government and was produced by Helmut Dietl and Norbert Preuss. Preuss, in an interview, stated though the story was written in German by Gallenberger, the Indian setting and Bengali language were chosen to maintain authenticity.

Noted Indian theatre actor Dilip Shankar who did casting in Mira Nair's Monsoon Wedding and Pan Nalin's Samsara, was appointed as the casting director for Shadows of Time. Aishwarya Rai, Sir Ben Kingsley and Vivek Oberoi were being considered for major roles in the film, but the roles of adult Ravi and adult Masha went to actors Prashant Narayanan and Tannishtha Chatterjee respectively. Gallenberger had spotted Narayanan in Chhal and was impressed by him. For the young Ravi and Masha, more than 7,000 schoolchildren were auditioned before they narrowed it down to Sikandar Agarwal and Tumpa Das. For portraying the old age of the characters, veteran Bengali actor Soumitra Chatterjee and actor Utpal Dutt's widow Sova Sen were chosen.

Gallenberger hired a Bengali communicator for a crash course in the language for non-Bengali members of the 100-member crew, which include 10 Germans. The lead actor Prashant Narayanan too had to take lessons in the language as he is originally from South India and did not know Bengali. The shooting of the film began in March 2003 at locations in and around Calcutta, and was finished in 12 weeks.

== Soundtrack ==
Shadows of Time

Soundtrack album by Gert Wilden Jr.
- Released: 18 April 2004
- Genre: Film score, Soundtrack
- Length: 46:20
- Label: Colosseum

The music in the film was composed by Gert Wilden Jr., who had earlier composed music in Gallenberger's Academy Award-winning 2000 short film Quiero ser (I want to be...).

1. "Prologue - Factory Memories" - 5:13
2. "City Lights" - 01:10
3. "Masha's Song" ^{[A]} - 2:38
4. "Clandestine Exercises" - 1:26
5. "Farewell" - 3:31
6. "Full Moon at the Temple" - 3:52
7. "Bansuri Phantasy" - 1:44
8. "Shining Shoes" ^{[B]} - 1:11
9. "Missing" - 2:51
10. "White Shoes" - 0:54
11. "The Letter" - 1:06
12. "Carlton" - 1:10
13. "In Search of Masha" - 2:19
14. "Ticket Booth" - 1:18
15. "Communication Breakdown" - 1:59
16. "Thinking of Masha" - 0:56
17. "Masha's Escape" - 0:57
18. "Another Farewell" - 1:11
19. "Behind The Door" - 3:02
20. "Dandy's Lover" ^{[C]} - 1:21
21. "The Kiss" - 1:52
22. "Epilogue" - 4:39

A : Vocals by Tannishtha Chatterjee; Music by Debojyoti Mishra; Lyrics by Amit Kumar & Florian Gallenberger
B : Performed by The Firehouse Jazzmen; Music by Werner Tautz
C : Performed by The Firehouse Jazzmen; Music by Heinz Kiessling

== Awards ==
The film was screened at the 5th International Film Festival of Marrakech on 12 November 2005. It was a nominee for the coveted Golden Star (Best Film), but lost to the Kirghiz film Saratan.

Won

- Bavarian Film Award for Best New Director (Florian Gallenberger)
- Bavarian Film Award for Best Cinematography (Jürgen Jürges)
- Best European Film at the Mons International Festival of Love Films

Nominated

- German Film Award for Best Cinematography (Jürgen Jürges)
- German Film Award for Best Costume Design (Lisy Christl)
- Best Film (Golden Star) at the International Film Festival of Marrakech
