= Michel Fessler =

French screenwriter and film director (1955–2025)

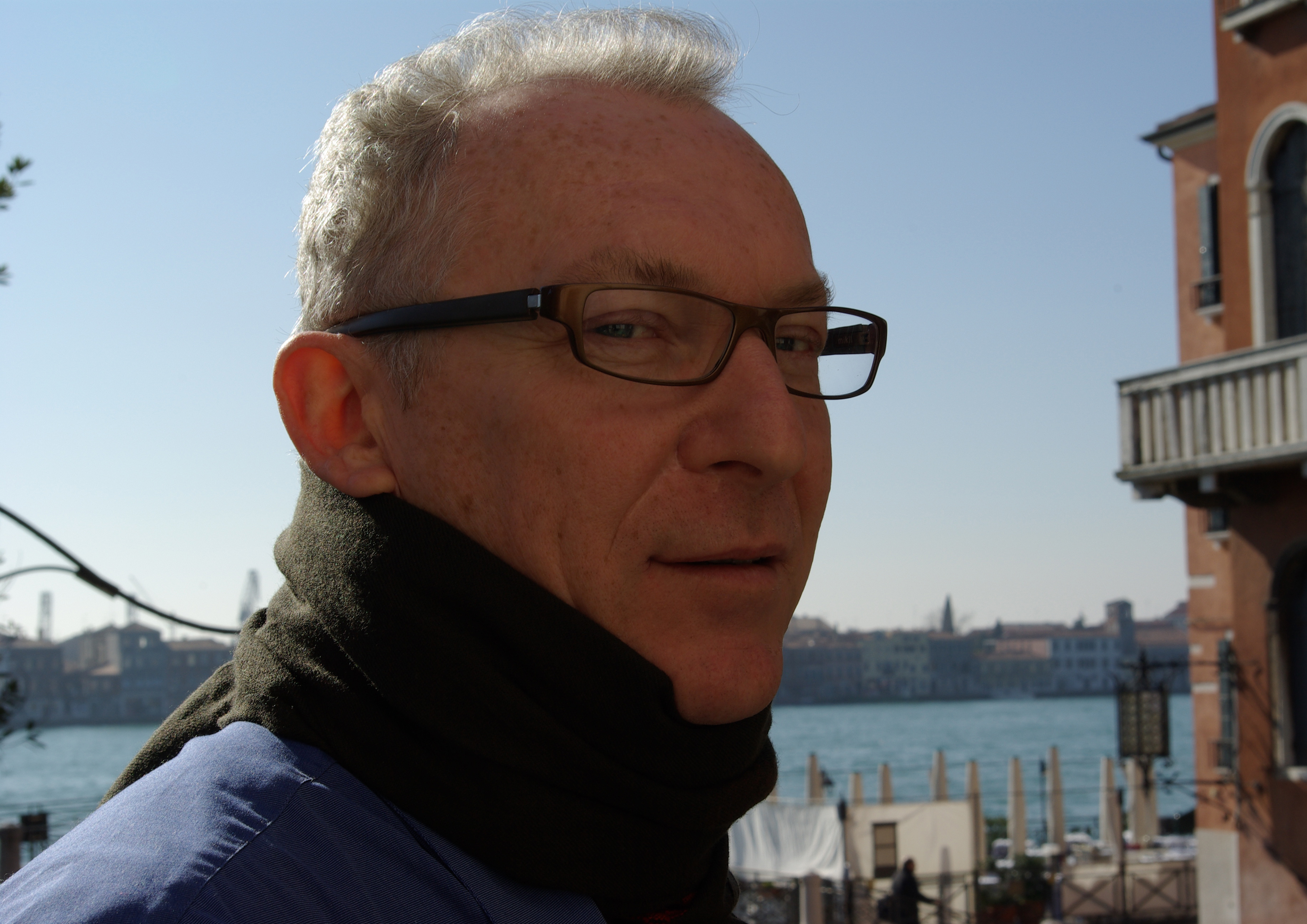
- Fessler in 2008
- Born: 19 May 1955
- Died: 19 August 2025 (aged 70)
- Occupation(s): Screenwriter; Film director

Michel Fessler (19 May 1955 – 19 August 2025) was a French screenwriter and film director.

His most notable films were Farinelli, Ridicule, and March of the Penguins, the last of which was nominated for the Writers Guild of America Award for Best Documentary Screenplay in 2006.

Fessler died on 19 August 2025, at the age of 70.

== Filmography ==
=== Screenwriter ===
- L'Année de l'éveil (1991)
- On Guard (1992)
- Farinelli (1994)
- Bête de scène (1994)
- Ridicule (1995)
- Hanuman (1998)
- The Boy Who Wanted To Be A Bear (2001)
- From Heaven (2003)
- A Species Odyssey (2003)
- Au sud des nuages (2005)
- Man to Man (2005)
- March of the Penguins (2005)
- Serko (2006)
- The Rise of Man (2007)
- The Dream of a King (2008)
- The Sea Wall (2008)
- Ao: The Last Hunter (2010)
- Alexandra David-Néel - J'irai au pays des neiges (2012)
- Ma bonne étoile (2012)
- A Jew Must Die (2016)
- The Lady in the Portrait (2017)
- Heart of Oak (2022)
- Little Nicholas: Happy as Can Be (2022)
- Visions (2023)
- Bambi: A Tale of Life in the Woods (2024)

=== Director ===
- Jean Reverzy, l'homme de passage (1995)
- À qui tu parles ? (1996)
- L'Esclavage (1996)
- La Leçon de monsieur Paillasson (1997)
- Bambi: A Tale of Life in the Woods (2024)
