= Mukesh Modi =

Indian filmmaker

- Born: Mumbai, India
- Occupations: Film director; screenwriter; film producer
- Years active: 2021–present

Mukesh Modi is an Indian film director, writer and producer who works in India's Bollywood and Hollywood films industry. He made his directorial, producer-writer debut with The Elevator (2021), An English-Language family drama film. He has also produced Mission Kashi (TV Series) (2022), Political War (2024) in Hindi.

Mukesh Modi is an independent film producer and the founder of the Indie Film Festival Awards (IFFA), a nonprofit organization based in New York City. The organization was established to support independent filmmakers and provides a platform for film screenings and awards. Modi is also associated with Indie Films World, an over-the-top (OTT) streaming platform that distributes films and other video content.His other ventures include Indie Films Inc., D Star Entertainment, The World Voice and B & H Buzz Creators.

== Filmography ==
=== As director ===
Year	Title	Notes	Ref.
2021	The Elevator		
2024	Political War		

=== As writer ===
Year	Film
2021	The Elevator
2024	Political War

=== As producer ===
Year	Film	Notes & ref.
2021	The Elevator	
2022	Mission Kashi	(TV Series)
2023	Torn	Feature film
2024	Political War	
2025	Thugs of Arms	(Web series)
2026	Khoonta	Feature film
