= University of Television and Film Munich =

German film school based in Munich

Coordinates: 48°06′33″N 11°35′54″E

- Type: Public
- Established: 19 July 1966; First course started 1967/68
- Affiliations: CILECT
- President: Bettina Reitz
- Faculty: 84
- Undergraduates: 268
- Location: Munich, Bavaria, Germany
- Departments: 5
- Website: www.hff-muc.de

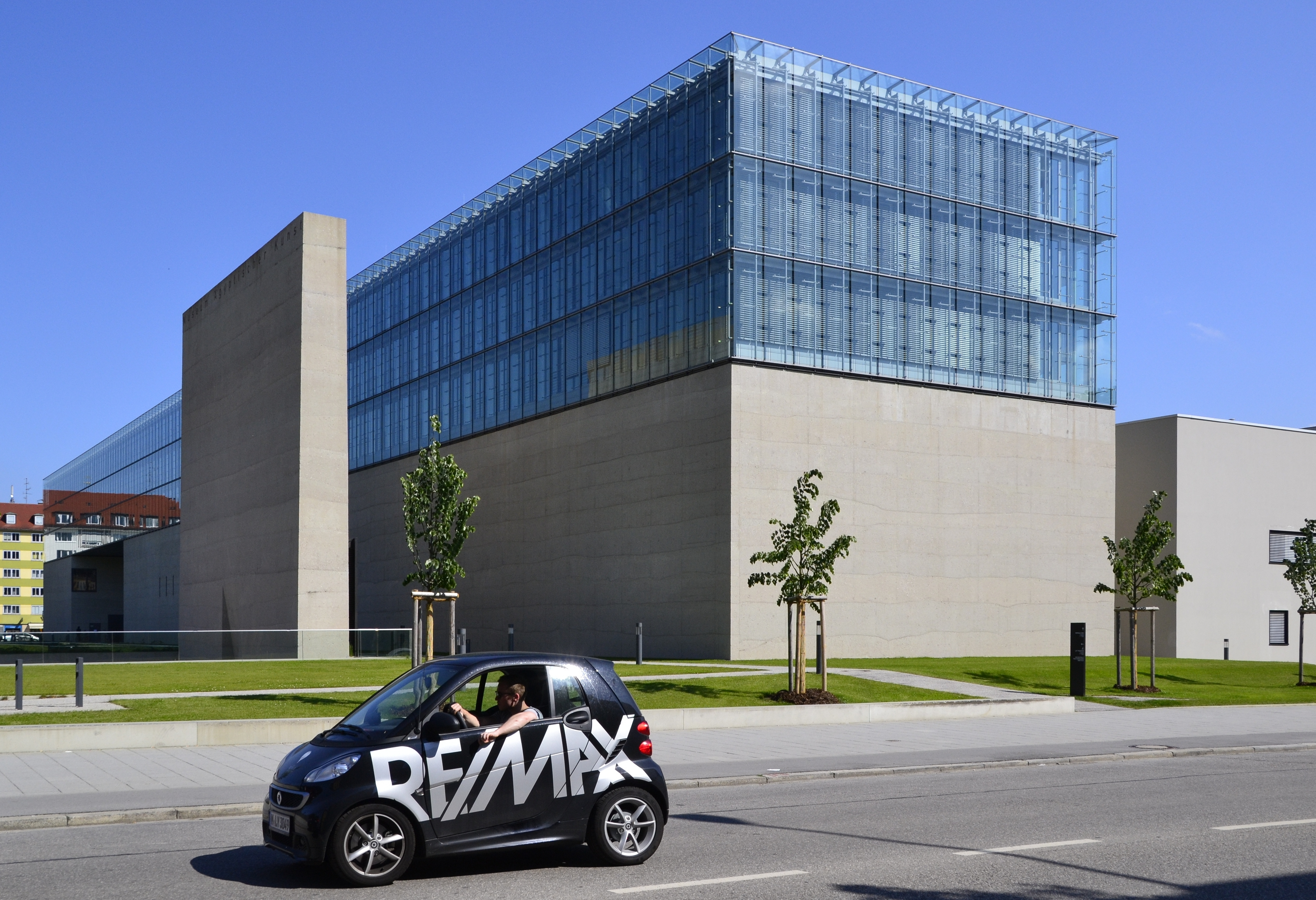
New HFF campus building

The University of Television and Film Munich (German: Hochschule für Fernsehen und Film München, short: HFF Munich) is a publicly funded film school in Munich, Germany. The school was established in 1966 by decree of the Bavarian government. The University of Television and Film Munich is one of Germany's most reputable film schools with about 350 students enrolled.

== Academics ==
The teacher to student ratio is about 1:9, the staff to student ratio is approximately 1:4. There are five different degree programs:

- Department III – Film and Television Drama Directing
- Department IV – Documentary Film and Television Reportage Directing
- Department V – Film Production and Media Economics
- Department VI – Screenplay
- Department VII – Cinematography

The new building of the University of Television and Film Munich was inaugurated in 2011, featuring three cinemas, a VR cinema and four film studios.

== Ranking ==
The film school has been selected as one of the 15 best film schools worldwide by the entertainment trade magazines Variety and The Hollywood Reporter in 2012, 2014, 2017, 2018, 2019, 2020, 2021 and 2024

== Notable alumni ==
- Baran bo Odar
- Maren Ade
- Husam Chadat
- Byambasuren Davaa
- Florian Henckel von Donnersmarck
- Doris Dörrie
- Uli Edel
- Bernd Eichinger
- Roland Emmerich
- Frauke Finsterwalder
- Florian Gallenberger
- Katja von Garnier
- Dominik Graf
- Benjamin Heisenberg
- Oliver Herbrich
- Mika Kaurismäki
- Caroline Link
- Till Schauder (M.A. 1998)
- Hans-Christian Schmid
- Hito Steyerl
- Wim Wenders
- Sönke Wortmann
- Christian Ditter

== Academy Awards ==
Several HFF alumni have been nominated or have received an Academy Award. Wim Wenders has been nominated for the Academy Award for Best Documentary Feature three times: Buena Vista Social Club in 2000, Pina (film) in 2012 and The Salt of the Earth in 2015. Caroline Link was nominated for the Academy Award for Best Foreign Language Film in 1997 with her film Beyond Silence and won the Academy Award for Nowhere in Africa in 2003.

In 2005 the docudrama The Story of the Weeping Camel was nominated for the Academy Award for The Best Documentary Feature. Florian Henkel von Donnersmarck won the same Academy Award in 2007 with his debut film The Lives of Others.

In 2017, the comedy Toni Erdmann by producer and director Maren Ade was nominated for the Academy Award for The Best Foreign Language Film. In 2018, Ades and her co-producer Janine Jackowski, also a HFF alumna, international co-production A Fantastic Woman won this award.

Florian Gallenberger won the Academy Award for Best Live Action Short with his film Quiero ser (I want to be...) in 2000. HFF students have also been gold winners at the Student Academy Awards in 1994, 2000, 2014 and 2016.
