= Deep6 =

2021 Indian Bengali drama film

- Directed by: Madhuja Mukherjee
- Written by: Madhuja Mukherjee
- Produced by: Shoojit Sircar; Ronnie Lahiri; Avik Mukhopadhyay; Harcharan Singh
- Starring: Tillotama Shome; Soumitra Chatterjee; Maya Ghosh; Chandan Roy Sanyal
- Cinematography: Avik Mukhopadhyay
- Edited by: Madhuja Mukherjee; Ankur
- Music by: Prabuddha Banerjee
- Production companies: Editfx Studios; Rising Sun Pvt. Ltd.
- Release date: 7 October 2021 (BIFF)
- Running time: 141 minutes
- Country: India
- Language: Bengali

Deep6 is a 2021 Indian Bengali drama film written and directed by Madhuja Mukherjee. The film, produced under the banner of Rising Sun Pvt Ltd production and Editfx Studios, stars Tillotama Shome, Chandan Roy Sanyal and Maya Ghosh, with pivotal roles by Sumanta Mukherjee, Soumitra Chatterjee and Sumeet Thakur. It premiered under the "A Window on Asian Cinema" section at 26th Busan International Film Festival on 7 October 2021 and was also screened in 'Indian Cinema Now' section at 26th International Film Festival of Kerala.

== Synopsis ==
In 2011, Calcutta witnesses the end of three decades of leftist party rule. Despite this monumental shift, life seemingly continues as usual. However, Mitul, a solitary young woman, finds her personal and political world deeply impacted by the new context. Additionally, she must confront the ghost of her deceased grandmother and deal with her ex-partner, who refuses to end their relationship or give up his political ambitions.

== Cast ==
- Tillotama Shome
- Chandan Roy Sanyal
- Maya Ghosh
- Sumanta Mukherjee
- Soumitra Chatterjee
- Sumeet Thakur

== Release ==
Deep6 had its world premiere at 26th Busan International Film Festival under the 'A Window on Asian Cinema' section on 7 October 2021. It was screened in 'Indian Cinema Now' section at 26th International Film Festival of Kerala held from 18 to 25 March 2022 and in 'Innovation in Moving Images' segment at 27th Kolkata international Film Festival.

== Reception ==
- Shoma Chatterji, an Indian film scholar, criticized inordinate length of the film funded by significant names like Shoojit Sircar, Ronnie Lahiri, Avik Mukhopadhayay, Harcharan Singh.
- In 'Into the depths of her survival' by journalist Rupeshree IV reviews that the "film is about a financially independent woman's choices, decisions and struggles have a burning heat that no one can beat. Tilothama Shome's portrayal of Mithul demonstrates her acting prowess once more".
