= Mumbai Can Dance Saala =

- Movie Poster
- Directed by: Sachindra Sharma
- Written by: Sachindra Sharma
- Produced by: Ranjeet Sharma
- Starring: Ashima Sharma; Rakhi Sawant; Prashant Narayanan; Aditya Pancholi; Shakti Kapoor; Rahul Sood
- Cinematography: Bashalal
- Edited by: Prakash Jha
- Music by: Songs: Bappi Lahiri; Nitin Shankar; Naresh Karwala; Lyrics: Shabbir Ahmed; Dr. Deepak Sneh; Taufiq Pallavi; Naresh Karwala
- Distributed by: Zee Music Company
- Release date: 2 January 2015
- Running time: 135 minutes
- Country: India
- Language: Hindi

Mumbai Can Dance Saala is a 2015 Bollywood film written and directed by Sachindra Sharma. The film stars Ashima Sharma, Aditya Pancholi, Shakti Kapoor and Rakhi Sawant in lead roles. Upon release, the film received negative reviews.

== Cast ==
- Ashima Sharma as Alia
- Prashant Narayanan as Saala
- Aditya Pancholi as JD
- Shakti Kapoor as Rocky
- Rakhi Sawant Julie
- Rahul Sood as Ajay
- Kiran Janjani as Mamta
- Pankaj Berry as Tarun
- Pradeep Aggarwal Vikram
- Manoj Maru as Anand
- Mukesh Tiwari as Inspector Shinde
- Anil Chauhan as Arjun
- Vikas Saxena as Balwinder

== Soundtrack ==
- "De Di Permission" - Ritu Pathak & Vinod Rathod
- "Mahiya" - Alka Yagnik & Shaan
- "Mumbai Can Dance Saalaa" - Sunidhi Chauhan
- "Salame Salame" - Bappi Lahiri
- "Shake My Kamariya" - Mamta Sharma
- "Maula Maula" - Goldie Sohel

== Critical reception ==
Renuka Vyavahare from The Times of India gave it 0.5 stars, writing ″The film is so excruciatingly boring that it might change the opinion of those who were against the shutting down of dance bars.″ Mumbai Mirror critic Rahul Desai gave it 0.5 stars and wrote ″Bar dancer Tarannum Khan financed C-grade movies at her prime, only to have an F-grade film "loosely based" on her made a decade later and movie has no class atol beside the controversy which took place in movie launching when director of the movie(Sachindra Sharma) was slapped by one of the female artist, who claimed to be Rakhi sawant's friend. She did a cheap publicity stunt.
