= Heart of Oak (film) =

2022 film by Laurent Charbonnier and Michel Seydoux

- Film poster
- Directed by: Laurent Charbonnier; Michel Seydoux
- Written by: Laurent Charbonnier; Michel Fessler; Michel Seydoux
- Produced by: Barthélémy Fougea; Michel Seydoux
- Cinematography: Mathieu Giombini; Laurent Charbonnier; Samuel Guiton
- Edited by: Sylvie Lager
- Music by: Cyrille Aufort
- Production companies: Camera One; Winds
- Distributed by: Gaumont
- Release dates: 13 February 2022 (Berlinale); 23 February 2022
- Running time: 80 minutes
- Country: France

Heart of Oak (French: Le Chêne, lit. 'The Oak') is a 2022 French nature documentary film directed by Laurent Charbonnier and Michel Seydoux. It is about an oak tree and the animals that live in it, portrayed without spoken commentary.

== Synopsis ==
Heart of Oak is a wordless documentary film that takes place at a 210 years old and 17 metres (56 ft) high oak tree in Sologne. It follows the tree and its animal inhabitants during one calendar year. The animals include insects, birds, mice and a red squirrel.

== Production ==
The French companies Camera One and Winds produced Heart of Oak with co-production support from Gaumont. The producers were Barthélémy Fougea and Michel Seydoux. The idea for the film came from Laurent Charbonnier, who co-directed it with Seydoux, and the screenplay was written by Michel Fessler and Seydoux. The music score was composed by Cyrille Aufort and there is an original song by Tim Dup. Cinematography was done by Mathieu Giombini, Charbonnier and Samuel Guiton. Sylvie Lager was the editor.

The tree is located close to Charbonnier's home and precisely 10 km from the Château de Chambord (Loir-et-Cher). Filming took a year and a half. The crew spent around 100 days on lookout at the tree. A chase sequence with a bird of prey, comprising 1 minute and 20 seconds of the finished 80-minute film, was the result of 15 days of work.

== Release ==
Heart of Oak premiered on 13 February 2022 at the 72nd Berlin International Film Festival, where it played in the Berlinale Special section. Gaumont released it in French cinemas on 23 February 2022. The French release was accompanied by explanatory podcasts and educational printed materials.

== Reception ==
Greg Wetherall of Little White Lies likened the filmmaking technique to Viktor Kossakovsky's Aquarela (2018) and the films of Dziga Vertov, highlighting Heart of Oak's use of music, humour and portrayal of nature. Wetherall called it "a hypnotic assault on the senses that captures the beauty and might of our natural world". In Le Figaro, Pierre De Boishue likened the tree to a hotel and said the film is reminiscent of Microcosmos (1996). He described it as an "ode to biodiversity" that "exudes superb poetry". Nicolas Schaller of L'Obs also compared it to Microcosmos and said Heart of Oak may educate small children about the cycles of nature, but is repetitive and might bore them instead. He said the animal interactions are "documentary in name only", as they were created through editing or staged. The film was nominated for Best Documentary Film at the 48th César Awards.
