= The Night Manager (Indian TV series) =

2023 Indian TV series

- Official release poster
- Genre: Action; Drama; Espionage; Spy thriller
- Created by: Sandeep Modi
- Based on: The Night Manager by John le Carré
- Written by: Shridhar Raghavan; Akshat Ghildial; Shantanu Srivastava
- Directed by: Sandeep Modi; Priyanka Ghose
- Starring: Anil Kapoor; Aditya Roy Kapur; Sobhita Dhulipala
- Theme music composer: Santhosh Narayanan
- Composer: Sam C. S.
- Country of origin: India
- Original language: Hindi
- No. of seasons: 1
- No. of episodes: 7

Production
- Executive producers: Preity G Zinta; David Farr; Gaurav Banerjee; Sandeep Modi; Sohail Abbas; Simon Cornwell; Stephen Cornwell; Arthur Wang; Joseph Tsai; Manisha Mudgal; Susanne Bier; Tessa Inkelaar
- Producers: Deepak Dhar; Rishi Negi; Rajesh Chadha
- Cinematography: Benjamin Jasper; Anik Ram Verma
- Editor: Parikshit Jha
- Running time: 43–63 minutes
- Production companies: Banijay Asia; The Ink Factory

Original release
- Network: Disney+ Hotstar
- Release: 16 February – 29 June 2023

The Night Manager is an Indian Hindi-language action crime thriller television series created by Sandeep Modi. It is a remake of the British television serial The Night Manager (2016), itself based on the 1993 novel of the same name by John le Carré. It stars Anil Kapoor, Aditya Roy Kapur and Sobhita Dhulipala, with Tillotama Shome, Ravi Behl, Saswata Chatterjee in supporting roles.

At the 2023 Filmfare OTT Awards, The Night Manager received 6 nominations, including Best Drama Series, Best Actor in a Drama Series (Kapoor and Kapur), Best Supporting Actor in a Drama Series (Chatterjee) and Best Supporting Actress in a Drama Series (Shome).

This series was nominated for Best Drama Series at the 52nd International Emmy Awards.

== Plot ==
Shantanu 'Shaan' Sengupta, a former Lieutenant in the Indian Navy, is currently working as a night manager in a premiere star hotel in Dhaka, amidst the Rohingya genocide in 2017. He is approached by Safina Kidwai, a 14-year-old girl married to the majority share owner of the star hotel, Freddie Rehman, to help her escape to India. Upon his refusal, she steals his phone and discreetly records a meeting in Shaan's phone between Shailendra 'Shelly' Rungta and her husband, about buying and smuggling illegal arms into Bangladesh. She also takes pictures of the paperwork and returns the phone to Shaan, so that he can view everything. Upon seeing everything, he goes to his friend, Vikram Bhagwat, of the Indian High Commission in Dhaka, to share the information and evidence

Vikram, in-turn, sends the information to RAW officer, Lipika Saikia Rao, who is the in-charge of Bangladesh, in New Delhi. She has been keeping tabs on Shelly and believes that the evidence she received from Safina and Shaan is enough to officially go after him. She requests Shaan to keep Safina safe for a night, till she arrives in Dhaka the next afternoon. Meanwhile, both Freddie and Shelly come to know about their meeting being leaked; Shelly asks Freddie to kill Safina. He, along with his men, searches the entire hotel for her. Shaan takes Safina to a new wing that is currently under construction in the star hotel, for safekeeping. The next day, as he goes out to get food for Safina, he calls Lipika to inquire about her current whereabouts; Lipika realises that her phone has been bugged and orders Shaan to hurry back to Safina. He comes back just as Safina falls to her death from the wing. Her death is ruled as a suicide by the local police, who say that she stole jewellery from the high-profile guests in the hotel and jumped as she was caught. This devastates both Shaan and Lipika, knowing completely well that both Freddie and Shelly were behind her death. This prompts Shaan to leave his job.

Two years later, Shaan now lives as a recluse in Shimla, working as a night manager in a star resort. He is constantly haunted by his failure to protect Safina. One day, his superior tells him that Shelly, along with his associates, is coming to stay in the hotel for a few days. Once they arrive, Shaan collects information from the trash in his room and mails it to Lipika. Over the course of his stay, Shelly constantly runs into Shaan. Each time, he is impressed with Shaan's demeanour. He even gives his coat to Shaan, as a token of remembrance, as he leaves the resort. The next day, Shaan is visited by an undercover Lipika, who has now been demoted to the archives section of the agency. They both decide to infiltrate Shelly's syndicate. After a dramatic set-up orchestrated by Lipika and her co-worker, Sarang, Shaan is able to reach Sri Lanka, by posing as an international runaway, to get close to Shelly.

He saves his son, Taha, in a fake kidnapping planned by Lipika. However, to further make it look real, he purposefully gets injured. Upon seeing and searching Shaan, both Shelly and his right-hand man, Brij Pal alias BJ, find a Sri Lankan passport with a different alias, on him. They decide to take him with them, for his recuperation. Shaan, as a result, successfully infiltrates Shelly's gang and succeeds in creating chaos amongst them. Shaan eventually finds out that Shelly is on the verge of bankruptcy and plans to go to Riyadh, to meet Bargati, an oil baron, with the hopes of making a deal with him. He also finds out that he has an Indian partner going by the alias Indra Dhanush. Using Shelly's lawyer, G. V., Lipika plants a set-up in Riyadh, to get BJ arrested. Shelly, with no other way out, offers Shaan the CEO position, which was previously occupied by BJ, for 30 years. Intending to take him out from the inside, Shaan gladly agrees to the offer.

== Cast ==
- Anil Kapoor as Shailendra 'Shelly' Rungta
- Aditya Roy Kapur as Shantanu 'Shaan' Sengupta / Joaquim Sequeira / Abhimanyu Mathur
- Sobhita Dhulipala as Kaveri 'K' Dixit, Shailendra's girlfriend
- Tillotama Shome as Lipika Saikia Rao, RAW Officer
- Ravi Behl as Jaiveer 'Jayu' Singh, Shelly's associate
- Rukhsar Rehman as Mrinal Singh, Jaiveer's wife
- Saswata Chatterjee as Brij Pal alias BJ, Shelly's right-hand man
- Varun Shashi Rao as Naren Rao
- Anand Vikas Potdukhe as Sarang Potdukhe
- Bagavathi Perumal as D'Silva, Lipika's contact in Sri Lanka
- Prashant Narayanan as ISIS Man
- Jagdish Rajpurohit as Nasser Loshkar, Shaan's superior in Dhaka
- Salim Siddiqui as P. Tiwari, Policeman
- Resh Lamba as Freddie Rehman, Shelly's associate and owner of the star hotel in Dhaka
- Arista Mehta as Safina Kidwai Rehman, Freddie's wife
- Supriya Shukla as Farzana Kidwai, Safina's mother
- Shrenik Arora as Taha Rungta, Shelly's son
- Joy Sengupta as Danish Khan, Lipika's superior in the RAW
- Vikram Kapadia as Mittal alias "Indradhanush", Lipika and Danish' superior in the RAW
- Akashdeep Sabir as JV
- Owais Bhatt
- Bhupendra Singh Negi
- Vipul Deshpande as Bangladesh Police Officer

== Episodes ==
Part (Note: Some publications refer to "part" as "season.")	Season	Episodes	Originally released
1	1	4	16 February 2023
2	1	3	29 June 2023

No. overall	No. in season	Title	Directed by	Written by	Original release date
1	1	"Zakhm"	Sandeep Modi, Priyanka Ghose	Shridhar Raghavan, Akshat Ghildial, Shantanu Srivastava	16 February 2023
Former Indian Navy Lieutenant Shantanu "Shaan" Sengupta, is currently working as a night manager in a premiere star hotel in Dhaka, amidst the Rohingya genocide in 2017. He is approached by Safina Kidwai, wife of the majority share owner of the star hotel, Freddie Rehman, to help her escape to India. Upon his refusal, she steals his phone and discreetly records a meeting between Shaildendra "Shelly" Rungta and Freddy, about buying and smuggling illegal arms into Bangladesh. She also takes pictures of the paperwork and returns the phone to Shaan, so that he can view everything. Upon seeing everything, he contact his friend, Vikram Bhagwat, of the Indian High Commission in Dhaka, to share the information and evidence. Vikram, sends the information to RAW officer, Lipika Saikia Rao, who is the in-charge of Bangladesh, in New Delhi. She has been keeping tabs on Shelly and believes that the evidence she received from Safina and Shaan is enough to officially go after him. She requests Shaan to keep Safina safe for a night, till she arrives in Dhaka the next afternoon. Meanwhile, both Freddie and Shelly come to know about their meeting being leaked; Shelly asks Freddie to kill Safina. He, along with his men, search the entire hotel for her. Shaan takes Safina to a new wing that is currently under construction in the star hotel, for safekeeping. The next day, as he goes out to get food for Safina, he calls Lipika to inquire about her current whereabouts, however, Lipika realizes that her phone has been bugged and orders Shaan to hurry back to Safina. He comes back just as Safina falls to her death from the wing. Her death is ruled as a suicide by the local police, who say that she stole jewelry from the high-profile guests in the hotel and jumped as she was caught. This devastates both Shaan and Lipika, knowing completely well that both Freddie and Shelly were behind her death. This prompts Shaan to leave his job. Two years later, Shaan now lives a reclusive life in Shimla, working as a night manager in a star resort. He is constantly haunted by his failure of not being able to save Safina back in Dhaka. However, one day, his superior tells him that Shelly, along with his associates, is coming to stay in the resort for a few days.
2	2	"Mission"	Sandeep Modi, Priyanka Ghose	Shridhar Raghavan, Akshat Ghildial, Shantanu Srivastava	16 February 2023
After Shelly and his team arrive, Shaan collects strong information, from the trash in his room, and mails it to Lipika. Over the course of his stay, Shelly constantly runs into Shaan. Each time, he is impressed with Shaan's demeanor. He even gives his coat to Shaan, as token of remembrance, as he leaves the resort. The next day, Shaan is visited by an undercover Lipika, who has now been demoted to the archives section of the agency. They both decide to infiltrate Shelly's syndicate. After a dramatic set-up orchestrated by Lipika and her co-worker, Sarang, Shaan is able to reach Sri Lanka, by posing as an international runaway, to get close to Shelly. He saves his son, Taha, in a fake kidnapping planned by Lipika. However, to further make it look real, he purposefully gets injured. Upon seeing and searching Shaan, both Shelly and his righ-hand man, Brij Pal alias BJ, find a Sri Lankan passport with a different alias, on him. They decide to take him with them, for his recuperation.
3	3	"Mehmaan"	Sandeep Modi, Priyanka Ghose	Shridhar Raghavan, Akshat Ghildial, Shantanu Srivastava	16 February 2023
Shaan, as a result, successfully infiltrates Shelly's gang and succeeds in creating chaos amongst them. Shaan eventually finds out that Shelly is on the verge of bankruptcy and plans to go to Riyadh, to meet Bargati, an oil baron, with the hopes of making a deal with him. He also finds out that he has an Indian partner going by the alias, Indra Dhanush. Using Shelly's lawyer, G. V., Lipika plants a set-up in Riyadh, to get BJ arrested, under homosexuality, which is banned in the Middle East.
4	4	"Sweetly-waala"	Sandeep Modi, Priyanka Ghose	Shridhar Raghavan, Akshat Ghildial, Shantanu Srivastava	16 February 2023
After it is successful, Shelly, with no other way out, offers Shaan the CEO position, which was previously occupied by BJ, for 30 years. Intending to take him out from the inside, Shaan happily agrees to the offer.
5	5	"Abhimanyu"	Sandeep Modi, Priyanka Ghose	Shridhar Raghavan, Akshat Ghildial, Shantanu Srivastava	29 June 2023
Lipika's team shows Danish that Shelly has a man named "Indradhanush" working with him, and calls made to someone in RAW, implying that Mittal is Indradhanush. Lipika & Danish goes to Mittal's boss, with copies of notes with GV's handwriting on them. Meanwhile, Shelly gives Shaan the new identity of Abhimanyu Mathur, the new CEO of Shelly's agricultural front, replacing BJ. Shaan's retinal scan is also used to authorize Shelly's bank transactions. Shelly takes Shaan with him to set up a deal. GV comes a day later, and is picked up by Shelly & Jayu, while Shaan sleeps with Kaveri. Shelly shows GV that Lipika had a copy of his notes and kills him. Meanwhile, Mittal talks to Lipika and Danish, and tells them that while he is Indradhanush and that Shelly is supposed to be working for him, not the other way around, ordering Lipika to shut down her operation. Lipika tries to get Shaan out, but he refuses, escaping with Shelly & his crew.
6	6	"Magic Trick"	Sandeep Modi, Priyanka Ghose	Shridhar Raghavan, Akshat Ghildial, Shantanu Srivastava	29 June 2023
Mittal wants the name of Lipika's inside man, but she refuses, so he sets up a committee hearing regarding Lipika's operation. Meanwhile, Shelly tells Shaan that someone in his crew is working for Lipika, but can't figure out whom. In Dubai, Shaan performs a weapons demonstration to a handful of generals, as well as a stranger, Mr. "What's in a Name." Shaan uses Kaveri to convince Shelly that BJ is working for Lipika and kills BJ, claiming he was trying to escape. Shaan sends a list of trucks to Lipika that he believes contains weapons. Danish sends the info to the US Military, but they only find oil in the trucks. Later, on Shelly's plane, Shelly tells Shaan that the only weapons he brought to Dubai were ones for the demonstration. The actual weapons are held elsewhere, where they will finalize the weapons deal. When Shaan wakes up, he learns that they're now in Dhaka, and are going back to the same hotel he worked at. Meanwhile, Lipika comes home to find her husband brutally injured, and is nearly killed by one of Shelly's men.
7	7	"Imarti"	Sandeep Modi, Priyanka Ghose	Shridhar Raghavan, Akshat Ghildial, Shantanu Srivastava	29 June 2023
After Lipika & her husband narrowly escape death, she finally convinces Mittal that Shelly cannot be trusted. Mittal gives her 48 hours to get hard evidence on Shelly to take him down. In Dhaka, Shelly introduces "Abhimanyu" to Freddie. Shelly reveals that they're finalizing a deal with Mr. "What's-in-a-Name", who plans to use the weapons on India. They receive half the money, and will receive the other half after showing the weapons tomorrow. Shaan asks Kaveri to give him the code to Shelly's safe, so Lipika can infiltrate while Shelly's partying. After Freddie gets too drunk, Shaan takes him home, where he kills him to avenge Safina and learns the location of Shelly's weapons. Meanwhile, Shelly receives a call from BJ's spy, who tells him that Taha's kidnapping was a set-up. While trying to use Shaan's retina scan, Shelly learns that his phone was swapped. Shaan shows What's-in-a-Name that he rigged the explosives to blow, destroying all of Shelly's weapons. When they return to the hotel, Lipika greets Shelly, who believes Mittal will help him. However, evidence recorded by Shaan gets Shelly arrested instead. Shelly assumes that he'll escape prison, until the officers in his van leave, and What's-in-a-Name's right hand man starts driving the van instead. Kaveri is free to go home to her son, and Shaan goes to the hotel wing where he stayed with Safina, happy that her killers have been brought to justice.

== Filming ==
The series was shot in India (Shimla, Jaisalmer, Delhi and Mumbai), Sri Lanka, Bangladesh and the Middle East.

== Release ==
Part 1 premiered on Disney+ Hotstar on 16 February 2023 and part 2 was released on 29 June 2023.

== Reception ==
The Night Manager received mostly positive reviews with praise directed towards the screenplay, production values, performances (particularly Kapoor, Kapur and Shome) and the direction. It is the first Indian TV series set to feature on a cover of a book published in South Asia authored by John le Carré.

Anuj Kumar of The Hindu wrote "The series also provides a platform for some understated performers to showcase their talent. Aditya Roy Kapoor finally gets a role where his performance matches his personality. The writing demands a certain emotional gravitas from him, and Aditya delivers."

Saibal Chatterjee for NDTV wrote "Because this version of the series takes four episodes to portray what was packed into three in the 2016 British production, it ends at a point where a great deal still remains to be unpacked."

Rohan Naahar for The Indian Express rated 3 stars out of 5 and wrote "The first part contains just four episodes, and the second, a pre-cap reveals, will arrive in June. Will audiences even be interested in returning to the series in three months? Who knows? Especially if they have access to the original as well."

Deepa Gahlot for Rediff.com wrote "The series, with Sandeep Modi as showrunner and co-director with Priyanka Ghose, gets the superficial trappings of the plot but not the complicated circuitry that makes the Le Carré novel tick."

Roktim Rajpal of India Today rate 2.5 star out of 5 and wrote "The Night Manager loses its steam from the second episode onwards. Several inherently intriguing sequences fail to pack a punch. The kidnapping sequence is perhaps the weakest of the lot. It lacks the intensity needed to make an impact."

Dishya Sharma for News18 wrote "Like most series, The Night Manager also witnesses a dip in pace in the third episode, slowly laying out all the cards. However, due to the abrupt end to the series, the dip doesn't fully shoot up in the fourth episode, leaving you hanging midair."

Ajit Andhere of Deccan Chronicle wrote "For some reason, only the first part of the series comprising four episodes has been released with the announcement of the next to follow soon. However, this serves as a major hindrance as the story is known to all already."

Nandini Ramnath for Scroll.in felt Tillotama Shome played the most valuable role and wrote "deceptively bumbling, resourceful, and ruthless when she needs to be, Shome's Lipika is a perfectly judged scene-stealer who gives the defanged remake the bite it is missing when its leads are around."

Reviewing the series, Tina Das of ThePrint wrote "While comparisons with the original are unavoidable, the adaptation to suit an Indian viewership does not dilute the experience. The themes of alienation of each character, and of dealing with the ghosts of the past emerge every few minutes, especially for Shaan."

== Accolades ==
Year	Award ceremony	Category	Nominee / Work	Result	Ref.
2023	Filmfare OTT Awards	Best Drama Series	The Night Manager	Nominated	
2023	Filmfare OTT Awards	Best Actor in a Drama Series	Aditya Roy Kapur	Nominated	
2023	Filmfare OTT Awards	Best Actor in a Drama Series	Anil Kapoor	Nominated	
2023	Filmfare OTT Awards	Best Supporting Actor in a Drama Series	Saswata Chatterjee	Nominated	
2023	Filmfare OTT Awards	Best Supporting Actress in a Drama Series	Tillotama Shome	Nominated	
2023	Filmfare OTT Awards	Best Adapted Screenplay (Series)	Shridhar Raghavan	Nominated	
2024	International Emmy Awards	Best Drama Series	The Night Manager	Nominated	
