= Prithvi Zutshi =

Indian television actor

- Occupation: Actor
- Years active: 1993–present

Prithvi Zutshi is an Indian film and television character actor. He had mostly featured in almost all movies of director Vikram Bhatt.

== Filmography ==
- 1993- Baazigar
- 1994- Drohkaal
- 1998- Ghulam
- 1999- Taal
- 2001- Kasoor
- 2002- Aap Mujhe Achche Lagne Lage
- 2003- Escape from Taliban
- 2003- Andaaz
- 2004- Aetbaar
- 2005- Elaan
- 2005- Apaharan
- 2005- Ek Khiladi Ek Haseena
- 2005- Garam Masala
- 2006- The Killer
- 2009- Ruslaan
- 2010- Apni Yari Jaan Se Pyaari
- 2011- B&W The Black And White Fact
- 2011- Aashiqon Ka Jalna Buri Baat Hai
- 2012- Mere Aashiq
- 2015- Hate Story 3
- 2017-Monsoon Shootout
- 2019 -Housefull 4
- 2024-Political War

== Television ==
Year	Serial	Role	Channel
1994–1995	Tehkikaat	Various Role	DD National
2002–2004	Devi	Satyen Kapoor	Sony Entertainment Television
2004–2007	Main Banoongi Miss India	Kamalakant Gujral	DD National
2005–2006	Kumkum – Ek Pyara Sa Bandhan	Pakiya	Star Plus
2006; 2007	Saat Phere – Saloni Ka Safar	Narendra Singh	Zee TV
2009	Love Ne Mila Di Jodi	Chaitanya Sharma	Star One
2023–2025	Jhanak	Amitabh Bose	Star Plus
2024	Mishri	Raghav’s grandfather	Colors TV

- Shanti
- Abhay charan(1996) as sriman gour mohan dey
- Raja Ki Aayegi Baraat (2008) as Lawyer
- Savdhaan India as Politician Prakash Trivedi (Episode No 798)
- Haunted Nights
- Pradhanmantri as Sardar Vallabhbhai Patel
- Shastri Sisters as Harishankar Pandey
- Adaalat
- Kaal Bhairav Rahasya as Sarpanch
- Chandrashekhar as Sarkar
- Ishq Mein Marjawan as Aarohi's father
- Ek Boond Ishq as Ranveer Singh Shekhawat
- Bindiya Sarkar as CM (2022)
