= Mr. Singh Mrs. Mehta =

- Directed by: Pravesh Bhardwaj
- Written by: Pravesh Bhardwaj
- Produced by: Manu Kumaran
- Starring: Prashant Narayanan; Aruna Shields; Naved Aslam; Lucy Hassan
- Cinematography: Mahendra Pradhan
- Music by: Ustaad Shujaat Hussain Khan; Shaarang Dev Pandit
- Release date: 25 June 2010
- Country: India
- Language: Hindi

Mr. Singh Mrs. Mehta is a 2010 Hindi-language film starring Prashant Narayanan and Aruna Shields. It is directed by Pravesh Bhardwaj. The film was produced by Manu Kumaran and was released on 25 June 2010. Mr. Singh/Mrs. Mehta is the directorial debut of Pravesh Bhardwaj and features the music of Grammy-nominated artist Ustaad Shujaat Hussain Khan.

== Plot ==
Neera Singh and Karan Singh are a couple living in London. Neera works in a small company, while Karan is in a big position in an advertising company. Neera is living in bliss until she eavesdrops on a phone call from her husband. That phone call raises a suspicion in Neera's mind. Neera's fears are confirmed, and she tracks down the woman's residence. But when a man opens the door, Neera is unsure of what to do. She tells the man that she came to the wrong address and leaves.

The man is Ashwin Mehta, a painter and an artist with a personal studio. Ashwin is the husband of Sakhi, the woman with whom Karan is having an affair. Ashwin sees Sakhi with Karan and secretly follows them to a hotel. Neera is already present there and gives him evidence of the extramarital affair. But Neera leaves Ashwin in a huff when she sees that he is apparently not angry over the situation. However, they meet each other again. The duo approach a rapport, and Neera even decides to pose for him.

Slowly Ashwin and Neera shed their inhibitions. They start getting attracted to each other and even end up having sex. Their guilt is only assuaged by the fact that they are getting back at their cheating spouses. Neera even lets Ashwin draw a nude of her. All this time, both Sakhi and Karan are unaware of it. However, when Neera says that she hopes Ashwin becomes a big artist and even more successful than Karan, Ashwin flares up and tells her that Karan's only achievement is that he is sleeping with Sakhi. Since Ashwin is doing the same thing with Neera, he has already settled a score. Hurt by those words, Neera leaves him.

The contact between Ashwin and Neera breaks. One day, Neera comes to break off with him, saying that their relationship cannot go anywhere and has to end someday. A heartbroken Ashwin comes home, only to find Sakhi waiting for him. Sakhi seems very happy. She shows Ashwin the nude of Neera and tells him that she likes the painting. Sakhi, who has no idea of the story behind the painting, has suddenly warmed up to the idea of having a baby. Ashwin decides to give a second chance to his marital life.

One day, Neera and Karan are walking by an exhibition where Karan is surprised to see Neera's nude that was made by Ashwin. Neera calmly walks in into the exhibition and faces a pregnant Sakhi shown standing by the painting. Sakhi recognizes Neera and understands the situation. Both Karan and Sakhi are shocked to see each other. Ashwin and Sakhi continue living happily, while Neera calls it quits with Karan and moves out of Karan's home.

== Cast ==
- Prashant Narayanan as Ashwin Mehta
- Aruna Shields as Neera Singh (Hindi voice dubbed as Mona Ghosh Shetty)
- Naved Aslam as Karan Singh
- Lucy Hassan as Sakhi Mehta

== Music ==
The movie has 6 vocal tracks and 4 instrumentals, composed by Ustaad Shujaat Hussain Khan and Shaarang Dev Pandit, son of Pandit Jasraj.

1. "Ai Khuda" - Ustaad Shujaat Hussain Khan (06:36)
2. "Barhaan Dil" - Shreya Ghoshal (05:09)
3. "Fariyaad Hai" - Richa Sharma (06:59)
4. "Behoshi Nasha Khushboo" - Udit Narayan and Shreya Ghoshal (08:19)
5. "Ajnabi Aankhein" - Roop Kumar Rathod (06:51)
6. "Barhaan Dil" - KK (05:09)
7. "Nailpolish On The Toes" - Instrumental (03:15)
8. "Losers Theme" - Instrumental (02:43)
9. "Solitaire Blues" - Instrumental (01:43)
10. "A Shade of Red" - Instrumental (05:03)

== Controversy ==
Upon the release of the film, Censor board of India didn't allow the nude scenes to be shown in cinemas, so those scenes were blurred in the film.
