= Ao: The Last Hunter =

- Film poster
- French: Ao, le dernier Néandertal
- Directed by: Jacques Malaterre
- Written by: Michel Fessler; Philippe Isard; Jacques Malaterre; Pierre Pelot
- Based on: Ao, l'homme ancien: L'Odyssée du dernier Neandertal by Marc Klapczynski
- Produced by: Yves Marmion; Patrick Sandrin
- Starring: Simon Paul Sutton; Aruna Shields; Craig Morris; Vesela Kazakova; Sara Malaterre; Helmi Dridi; Ilian Ivanov; Yavor Vesselinov
- Music by: Armand Amar
- Release date: 29 September 2010
- Running time: 84 minutes
- Country: France
- Languages: Invented languages French
- Budget: $13.4 million
- Box office: $1.7 million

Ao: The Last Hunter (French: Ao, le dernier Néandertal) is a 2010 French prehistoric paleoanthropological fiction film directed by Jacques Malaterre. It is loosely based on the first novel of the Marc Klapczynski trilogy Aô, l'homme ancien (2010).

== Plot ==
The film takes place approximately 30,000 years BP, and focuses on the period of co-existence between Neanderthals and Cro-Magnons, where the two populations shared some parts of the Eurasian landscape.

The film begins in Northern Siberia with two Neanderthals; Aō (Simon Paul Sutton) and Boorh (Craig Morris) delivering food to their clan after hunting herbivores (likely elk). Once they reach their cave, they realize that Ao's wife is in the midst of giving birth to their daughter, whom Ao names Néā. One day, a polar bear attacks and kills a man guarding their cave. Ao and Boorh go after it to avenge their fellow hunter. Ao successfully kills the bear, but Boorh is killed in the process. After returning from the hunt, Ao finds that his clan, including his wife and their young Néa, were massacred in their cave (for a reason which shall go unknown) by the anatomically modern humans that had arrived on the landscape. While Ao mourns for his family, a band of Cro-Magnon hunters attack him. Ao manages to overpower them, but decides to spare their lives and allow them to escape. As Ao continues to mourn, he plays his bone flute and reminisces about his childhood with his original clan near the ocean in Southern Iberia. With his clan dead, Ao decides to leave his outpost in the frigid, barren tundra in Siberia, to reunite with his brother Oā in the South where he was born. Throughout his journey, he sees visions of his twin brother playing a log drum.

During the course of his travel near Northern Europe, Ao falls into a dug pit covered in leaves while hunting a wild boar. He encounters a hunting party of Cro-Magnon hunters who help him out, but then Ao is knocked out cold by the head woman Unāk (Vesela Kazakova). Ao is held captive by the band of modern humans who participate in human sacrifices. They lock him inside a storage room filled with dead bodies from past sacrifices. He encounters a pregnant Homo Sapiens woman from a different tribe, named Āki (Aruna Shields). Aki and her husband Āka (Yavor Vesselinov) were stolen from their homeland. Aka is executed (or sacrificed) by the headman Agūk (Helmi Dridi) with the powerless Aki looking on, screaming for him. After witnessing Aka’s murder, Ao decides to escape with the help of a wasp's nest he found on a tree within his enemies' campsite. Covering himself with mud after breaking from his bonds, he knocks off the wasp's nest to let the angry swarm distract his enemies long enough for him to escape. Unbeknownst to him, Aki followed him quietly until he falls asleep in a cave. Ao wakes up after hearing strange sounds. Afraid that it might be his pursuers, he puts out his campfire and goes to investigate. He discovers Aki moaning and screaming in a secluded part of the cave as she is giving birth to her daughter Wāmā. Witnessing this, Ao believes that the newborn infant is the reincarnation of his deceased daughter, Néa. Both stay in the cave for a short while but remain distant from the other. As Aki observes Ao's interest in her daughter, not understanding why due to the language barrier, she grows wary of Ao. In the middle of the night, Ao takes Wama while Aki is sleeping. In the morning, The distressed Aki vows to take back her daughter and follows Ao’s trail to retrieve her stolen child. Ao does his best to care for the infant, but realizes he can’t keep a newborn alive without her mother to breastfeed Wama. Aki arrives at Ao’s resting place and hides behind a hill, waiting for the right time to attack Ao. Unbeknownst to both of them, Agūk, Unāk, and a handful of the tribe’s warriors are on both their trails. While Ao is resting with Wama, Aki runs towards him with her spear in order to kill him. Ao manages to evade her strike by rolling away. Aki then grabs her baby and bolts, but her path is blocked by Agūk and his men. As Ao fights off the warriors, Aki squares off with Unāk who knocks her out. Before she can kill Aki and the baby, Ao comes to her and Wama’s defense and knocks Unāk unconscious. Agūk sees this and takes Ao head on, fist to fist. The stronger Neanderthal man wins the fight and sends the defeated warriors retreating.

After defeating the marauding Cro-Magnon warriors, Ao continues his journey to his birthplace with a captive Aki. Realizing Wama needs her mother in order to stay alive, Ao allows Aki to feed her daughter, but he keeps the baby close to him at all times as to keep Aki from running off with the baby. He pushes Aki in front of him as they travel so he can keep an eye on her. Over time, Ao becomes very ill. As the pair trek through a swampy area, Ao has a coughing spell and nearly drowns in the water. Aki manages to grab Wama from Ao, but he holds onto her and bids her to dry land. As they make it to the shore, Ao is even sicker and too weak to stop Aki from fleeing with her child. She heads back into the water in the direction of her homeland, but then, out of pity for the gravely ill stranger, decides not to leave Ao to die, who is now collapsed on the ground. Aki carries the unconscious man to an abandoned campsite and begins to nurse Ao back to health. In the camp, she finds a spear thrower as well as other provisions she will need. Some time later, Ao awakes feeling better than ever thanks to Aki’s care and shows more respect towards the woman. On the same day. Aguk’s men catch up with them and chase the pair into a cave with multiple passages. Aki manages to kill one with her spear thrower and Ao manages to kill the rest in a narrow tunnel by stuffing the tiny exit with a burning piece of his polar bear pelt, thus suffocating the warriors who are unable to crawl back out. Aki guides Ao into a chamber decorated with cave drawings. Ao, who has never seen cave drawings before, mistakes a painting for a real rhinoceros, but Aki reassures him it’s just a painting. She teaches him how to make handprints by spitting yellow paint over her hand to creat a negative handprint and then dips his hand in red paint. She then places it on top of her painting. This painting lesson plants the seeds for their unconventional relationship to grow. Aki and Ao, over time, learn to understand each other as well as trust one another. Aki even teaches him how to use the spear thrower and allows him to bond with Wama, whom he still calls Nēa.

As they reach Central Europe, they come across a gigantic cavern filled with mammoth skeletons which are perfectly intact and are used as housings by another Cro-Magnon tribe. The mammoth bone housings are filled with human skulls; Neanderthal skulls. While Ao investigates the camp, Aki washes herself in a shallow pool, naked. Ao gets aroused by this and wants to mate with her, but she rejects him. Before anything can happen, an old Neanderthal man who was watching them knocks Ao out. The old man is clearly alone. He also appears to be losing his grip on sanity as he seems desperate for companionship. When Ao wakes up, the small tribe has come back with their recent hunt. The old man goes up to them in hopes to be welcomed in. He is rejected, however, due to his strange features and his odd behavior. Aki introduces herself to the leader and is welcomed into the tribe along with Wama. The people of the tribe then take offense to Ao’s presence and throw stones at him. Aki, feeling betrayed by Ao’s advances towards her, angrily throws his polar bear wrap at him and screams at him to leave and that Wama belongs to her. Realizing what he did to her was wrong and that Wama is not really Nēa, Ao slowly stumbles out of the cave in shame along with the old man who also throws stones at him during the night, above the tribe's cavern. Ao camps for the night. The old man hands Ao a Neanderthal skull and then laughs maniacally as he slips into the dark. Ao then sadly plays his bone flute to the vision of Oa playing his log drum. Back at the camp, Aki is almost taken advantage of by the tribe leader. She fights him off and storms out of the tent with her baby. She feels deep regret for sending Ao away and misses him. Ao, out of frustration and yearning for Aki, throws his polar bear wrap down a shaft which drops back down into the camp in front of Aki. Aki sadly rests on top of it to feel close to Ao. In the morning, Aki notices that the younger members of the tribe as well as the old man have taken Ao’s wrap and are reenacting the other day's events. She feels resentment towards the tribe and decides to chase after Ao. Ao, trying to catch a rabbit, is surprised by Aki’s return, but is still conflicted about her intentions. He tries to walk away from her, but Aki desperately runs after him while begging him not to go without her. She even places Wama in his arms in order to show she forgives him. The two then reconcile and continue their journey.

Ao and Aki make their way through a vast desert towards Southern Iberia, Ao’s homeland. Further into the trip, the pair come across a wild steppe horse herd. With the desert heat taking its toll on them, Aki and Ao take a rest to feed Wama, but Aki discovers she lost her milk due to dehydration. With no way to keep Wama alive, Aki slips into despair and Ao is wracked with fear for Aki and the baby. Out of desperation, Ao goes off to look for a way to save them and finds a mare with a nursing colt. Ao is able to coerce the animals to where Aki is. The two are able to feed Wama as well as themselves with the mare's milk. When they’ve had their fill, Ao thanks the mare and sends the animals off. As Aki and Ao watch the horses leave, it starts to rain. During the thunderstorm, the two make love in the rain and become a mated pair.

As they reach Southern Europe, Ao finally finds his birthplace. However, he soon learns that his twin brother Oa, along with his entire clan, have already been consumed by an illness that had entered their cave. Ao is, at least symbolically, the sole survivor of the Neanderthals. Ao is grief stricken and contemplates jumping from a cliff to his death. Aki, desperate to stop him, tells him that Nēa needs him. As he turns to go to her, a gust of wind pushes him over the side while Aki screams in despair; believing he has fallen to his death. Ao, however, has held on to edge and manages to pull himself back up. Ao rushes to Aki and Wama, and the couple happily embrace and kiss.

Four years later, ostracized by other tribes, Ao and Aki reach Southern Iberia to settle and raise their family in solitude, close to the last known signs of Neanderthal life on Earth. Ao is carrying the now four-year old child renamed Nēa on his shoulders towards the beach with Aki walking behind them, heavily pregnant with Ao's child, Nēa’s half-sibling. As the small family enjoy relaxing on the rocky beach, both Ao and Nėa rest their heads on Aki’s large belly, listening to the heartbeat of the unborn child.

== Filming ==
The movie was filmed on multiple locations in Europe; France (including Murat-le-Quaire, Calanque de Sugiton, Vercors, Camargue, and Font d'Urle), Bulgaria (notably the Prohodna Cave), and Ukraine.

== Cast ==
- Simon Paul Sutton as Ao, the main protagonist of the film. He is the chieftain of a small Neanderthal clan in Northern Siberia. After his clan was exterminated by early modern humans, Ao embarks on a journey to find his native tribe in southern Europe, and his twin brother Oa, from whom he was separated when he was eleven.
- Aruna Shields as Aki, the second protagonist who dominates the plot. She is a female Homo Sapiens who is captured by the same tribe of modern humans who imprisoned Ao. The film repeatedly depicts her as an independent female character.
- Helmi Dridi as Aguk, the main antagonist of the film. He is the headman of a tribe of early modern humans.
- Craig Morris as Boorh, Ao's friend and a member of his clan.
- Vesela Kazakova as Unak, Ao's wife.
- Yavor Vesselinov as Aka, Aki's husband.
- Sara Malaterre as the four year old Wama, the daughter of Aki and her late husband. She became Ao's stepdaughter after her mother and him decided to become a couple nearing the end of the film.

== See also ==
- Jacques Malaterre
