= Hanuman (1998 film) =

- French theatrical release poster
- Directed by: Frédéric Fougea
- Written by: Frédéric Fougea; Michel Fessler
- Produced by: Nathalie Auffret
- Starring: Robert Cavanah; Tabu
- Cinematography: Bernard Lutic
- Edited by: Yann Dedet; Frédérique Lebel
- Music by: Laurent Ferlet
- Production company: Gaumont
- Distributed by: Gaumont Buena Vista International
- Release date: 28 October 1998 (France)
- Running time: 84 minutes
- Countries: France; India
- Language: English

Hanuman is a 1998 French-Indian film directed by Frédéric Fougea. The film stars Scottish actor Robert Cavanah and Indian actress Tabu in the lead roles. The film was dubbed in Danish as Hanuman og abernes tempel with Henrik Koefoed, Vibeke Hastrup, and Søren Sætter-Lassen providing the voices of Tom, Anja, and Ashok, respectively. The film was alternatively titled as The Monkey Who Knew Too Much. It was the on-screen debut for Nithya Menen as a child artist.

== Cast ==
- Robert Cavanah as Tom
- Tabu as Anja
  - Nidhi Dharamaraj as Young Anja
- Nathalie Auffret as Alice
- Khalid Tyabji as The Hermit
- Jaaved Jaaferi as Ashok
- Yatin Karyekar as the Superintendent
- Ramesh Pandit as Ravi
- Jim Adhi Limas as Louis
- Tom Alter as Tom's father
- Sidney Kean as Roberto
- Govind Rao as Anja's father
- Nitiya Sukumaran as Moona
- Robin Arthur Corner Jr. as Young Tom
- Hans Kaushik as Young Sadhou

The film also features bonnet macaques named Hanu, Jeela and Long Tooth.

== Release ==
Carla Meyer of SF Gate praised the performances of Cavanah and the monkeys and wrote that "By the last third, "Hanuman" has become a pretty predictable good-versus- evil story. But the picture's great beauty, and the obvious care that it took to make it, override the triteness". Dennis Harvey of Variety similarly wrote that " Fougea’s deft orchestration of two trained and 50 wild monkeys — who make antic, appealing camera subjects — nicely suspends disbelief, while his brisk pacing makes the somewhat formulaic script go down easily". On the contrary, Jesper Vestergard of CinemaZone criticized the film and wrote that "The film's expression never manages to land a place where it can satisfy neither children nor adults, and the magical element of history with the monkey god never comes to its own".

== Awards ==
Award	Category	Recipient(s) and nominee(s)	Work	Result
Cinequest Film Festival	Audience Favorite Choice Award - Honorable Mention	Frédéric Fougea	Hanuman	Won
