= Political War (film) =

- Directed by: Mukesh Modi; Vivek Srivastava
- Written by: Mukesh Modi
- Produced by: Mukesh Modi
- Starring: Rituparna Sengupta; Prashant Narayanan; Seema Biswas; Milind Gunaji; Prithvi Zutshi
- Cinematography: Chandan Singh; Ketak Dhiman
- Edited by: Manish Sinha
- Music by: Satendra Tiwari; DJ Sheizwood
- Release date: 23 February 2024
- Country: India
- Language: Hindi

Political War is a 2024 Indian Hindi-language political drama film produced by Mukesh Modi and directed by Mukesh Modi and Vivek Srivastava. The film stars Rituparna Sengupta, Prashant Narayanan, Seema Biswas, Milind Gunaji and Prithvi Zutshi. The film was released on 23 February 2024.

== Cast ==
- Rituparna Sengupta as Pooja Ganguli
- Prashant Narayanan as Shivam
- Seema Biswas as Sunita Chatterjee
- Milind Gunaji as Abdulla
- Prithvi Zutshi as Mustaq
- Dev Sharma as Chandan
- Kanan Malhotra as Mahbub
- Arun Bakshi as Kanojia
- Ravi Sarma as Raj Gandhar
- Subhashis Chakraborty as Modenwal
- Anushi Sharma as Priya
- Anuradha Chandan as Monika
- Shishir Sharma as Manjit Biswal
- Aman Verma as Sumit
