= Jacques Malaterre =

French filmmaker and film director

Jacques Malaterre is a French filmmaker and film director, born in Avignon, Vaucluse.

Teacher for children with disabilities, and host of radio stations before 1989, he made documentaries and the docufiction aired on television. Among the latter, A Species Odyssey, Homo sapiens and The Rise of Man, dedicated to prehistory and human evolution with scientist Yves Coppens as a consultant, had a wide audience with the general public.

On 29 September 2010, he released the film Ao: The Last Hunter, an adaptation of the novel by Marc Klapczynski, Ao l'homme ancien.

== Filmography ==
Year	Title	Role	Notes
1993	L'amour dans l'âme	Director & Writer	Short
1993	Mazeppa	Technical advisor	Directed by Bartabas
1996	Un siècle d'écrivains	Director	TV Series (1 Episode)
1997	Le cri du silence	Director	TV Movie
1997	La colère d'une mère	Director	TV Movie
1997	Juge et partie	Director	TV Movie
1998	Le choix d'une mère	Director	TV Movie
1998	Un siècle d'écrivains	Director	TV Series (1 Episode)
1999-2000	Boulevard du Palais	Director	TV Series (4 Episodes)
2000	L'arlésien	Director	TV Movie
2000	Sauvetage	Director	TV Series (1 Episode)
2000	Vérité oblige	Director	TV Series (1 Episode)
2001	Commissariat Bastille	Director	TV Series (1 Episode)
2002	L'amour interdit	Director & Writer	TV Movie
2002-04	S.O.S. 18	Director	TV Series (3 Episodes)
2003	A Species Odyssey	Director, Writer & Editor	Documentary; 7 d'Or - Professionals Vote : Best Documentary; Nominated - European Film Award for European Documentary
2005	Homo sapiens	Director	Documentary
2007	Le sacre de l'homme	Director & Writer	Documentary
2009	Ce jour là, tout a changé	Director	TV Series (1 Episode)
2010	Ao: The Last Hunter	Director & Writer	
2011	Carmen	Director & Writer	TV Movie
2011	Calanques, les-secrets, légendes et merveilles	Director	Documentary
2013	Le plus beau pays du monde	Writer	Documentary directed by Fred Fougea
2014	Monsieur Max et la Rumeur	Director	TV Movie
2016	The law of Christophe	Director	TV Movie
2016	L'affaire de Maître Lefort	Director & Writer	TV Movie
2017	Les oubliés de l'histoire	Director & Writer	TV Series (12 Episodes)
