= Quiero ser (I want to be...) =

2000 film

- Directed by: Florian Gallenberger
- Written by: Florian Gallenberger
- Produced by: Christian Becker; Florian Gallenberger; Horst Knechtel; Michel Morales
- Starring: Emilio Perez; Fernando Pena Cuevas
- Cinematography: Jürgen Jürges
- Edited by: Hansjörg Weißbrich
- Music by: Gert Wilden Jr.
- Production companies: CineCam GmbH; Hochschule für Fernsehen und Film München; Indigo Filmproduktion
- Release date: 2000
- Running time: 35 minutes
- Countries: Mexico; Germany
- Language: Spanish

Quiero ser (I want to be...) is a 2000 Mexican-German short drama film directed by Florian Gallenberger. It won an Oscar in 2001 for Best Short Subject.

== Cast ==
- Emilio Perez as Juan, as a boy
- Fernando Pena Cuevas as Jorge, as a boy (as Fernando Peña)
- Chaco as Chaco
- Mario Zaragoza as Juan
- Luis Escutia as Jorge
- Maricela Olguin as Eismädchen / Icegirl
- Memo Gil as Ballonhändler / Balloonseller
- Martina as Kellnerin / Waiter
- Ariceli Godinez as Hähnchenverkäuferin / Chicken seller
- Julio Coiman as Hausmeister / Caretaker

== Plot ==
The film is about two brothers, Jorge and Juan, who live on the streets of Mexico City. They try to earn 100 pesos as street singers in order to be able to pay for the long-awaited balloons and a licence to sell them as soon as possible. Juan, the younger of the two brothers, can read, write and do maths and demonstrates a great sense of responsibility: for example, he is strictly against spending the money on food, so the two brothers look for something edible in the rubbish. Juan is also more adept at business (for example, he is able to persuade the balloon seller from whom they want to buy the balloons and the licence to stick to the agreed price of 100 pesos) and dreams of a better life in which he can also go to school. Jorge is portrayed as less responsible and intelligent than his brother. He is also less frugal with his money and keeps some so that he can buy things for his beloved. One day, Jorge steals 20 pesos from the joint till to go on a date with the girl. Juan does not forgive his brother for this breach of trust, leaves him and tries to make his way through life on his own from then on.

20 years later, he returns to the place of their childhood as a successful man and sees his brother Jorge, who is still leading a bleak life as a street singer, but does not speak to him.
