= Aruna Shields =

British actress

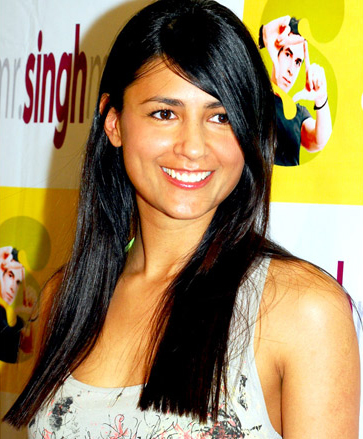
- Shields in 2010
- Born: Aruna Lakkur Nagappa Srinivasa Murthy
- Citizenship: United Kingdom
- Occupations: Actress, psychotherapist
- Years active: 2002−2014
- Website: www.arunashields.com

Aruna Lakkur Nagappa Srinivasa Murthy, better known as Aruna Shields, is a British psychotherapist and a former actress and filmmaker. She debuted with the 2010 Indian film Prince starring Vivek Oberoi.

== Career ==
Born to an Indian father and a British mother she was, while at a theatrical workshop, spotted by an acting agent. According to Google Trends, in the year 2010, Shields was the number one most sought-after actress in internet queries originating from India.

Shields has a wellbeing channel on YouTube called Aruna Shields TV, which began in 2015.

Her education includes a distinction from the Guildhall School of Music and Drama, a B.A. from Central Saint Martins. She has also studied hypnosis psychotherapy in London and has trained in mindfulness.

She made her Bollywood debut in 2010 in the action thriller Prince, released on 9 April 2010. The same year, she played the female lead in the epic adventure Ao The Last Neanderthal, a love story set 30,000 years ago in a lost savage world. The film was produced by European cinema chain UGC.

Her film Mr. Singh Mrs. Mehta was released on 25 June 2010.

Shields is also a dance choreographer and has experience as a belly dancer.

== Filmography ==
=== Film ===
Year	Title	Role	Notes
2002	Jesus the Curry King	Journalist	
2005	Private Moments	Saira	
2007	Mission Improbable		
2010	Prince	Maya	
2010	Mr. Singh Mrs. Mehta	Neera Singh	
2010	Ao: The Last Hunter	Aki	
2011	Dhada	Lolita	Item number
2012	Vanilla Sundae	Jazz Kaur	
2014	Gold Frapp		

=== Television ===
Television	Role	Notes
Uncovering Iran	Athlete	BBC
Breakfast with Frost	Guest	BBC
Byker Grove	Love interest	Sir David Frost
