= A Species Odyssey =

- A Species Odyssey DVD Cover
- Written by: Jacques Malaterre; Jacques Dubuisson; Michel Fessler
- Directed by: Jacques Malaterre
- Theme music composer: Yvan Cassar

Original release
- Network: France 3
- Release: January 7, 2003

A Species Odyssey (French: L'Odyssée de l'espèce) is a French documentary film directed by Jacques Malaterre, first broadcast on January 7, 2003, on France 3.

== Synopsis ==
This documentary illustrates the birth of the first men. Species shown include Australopithecus afarensis, Orrorin, saber tooth cat, Saelanthropus Chalicotherium, Australopithecus anamensis, hyena, Homo habilis, crocodile, Homo ergaster, Homo erectus, viper, lion, Neanderthal, brown bear, and Homo sapiens.

== Production ==
- Title: L'Odyssée de l'espèce
- Directed by: Jacques Malaterre
- Screenplay: Jacques Dubuisson and Michel Fessler
- Actors: Sibusiso Mhlongo
- Original concept: Hervé Dresen
- Narration: Frederick Fougea
- Original music: Yvan Cassar
- Scientific director: Yves Coppens
- Production: France 3, RTBF, Transparencies Productions, 17 Juin Production, Mac Guff Ligne, Pixcom, Discovery Channel Canada, Channel 4, RAI, ZDF, TSR, Planet, France 5
