= Florian Gallenberger =

German film director and writer (born 1972)

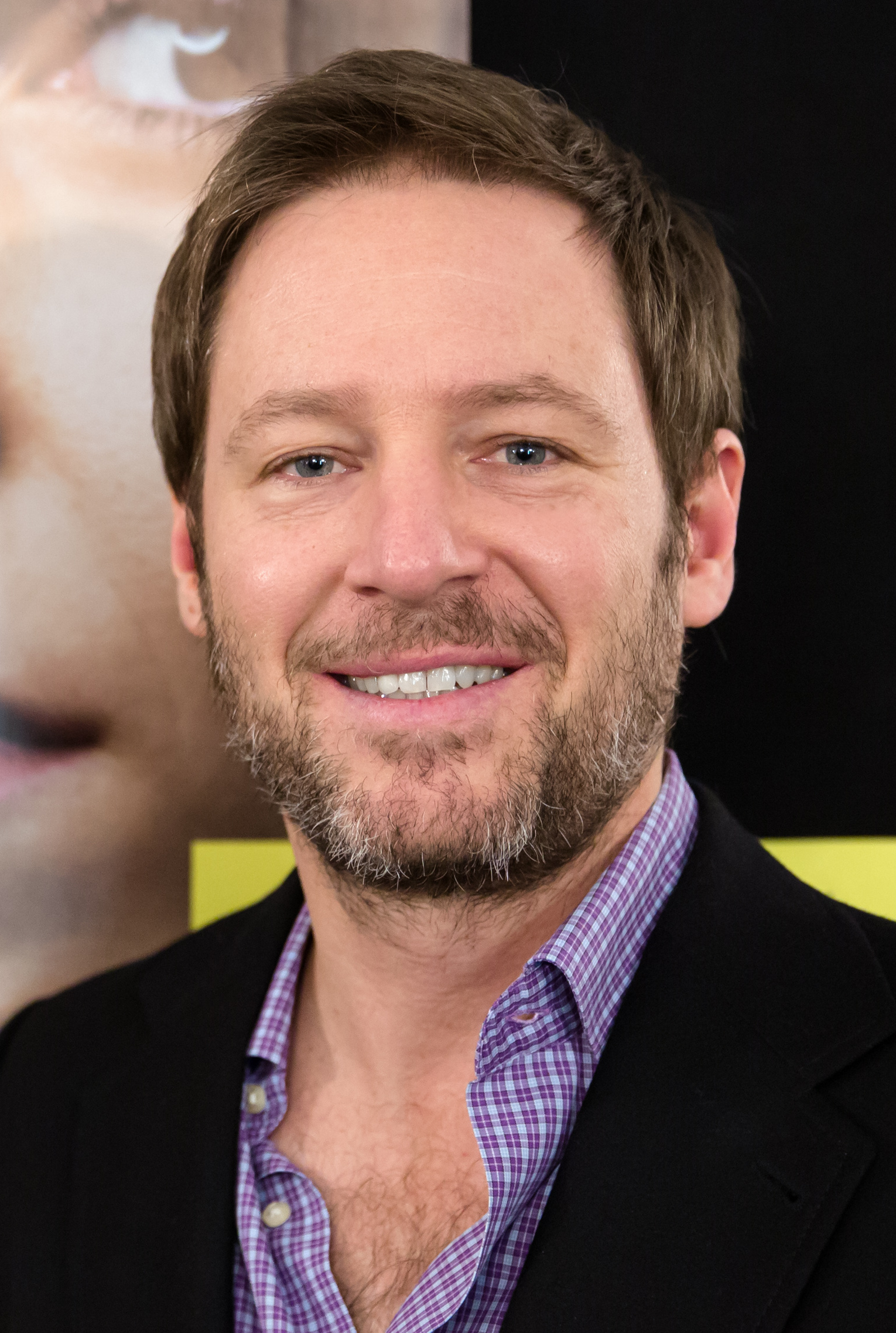
- Florian Gallenberger in 2016
- Born: 23 February 1972 (age 54); Munich, West Germany
- Occupations: Director, Writer
- Years active: 1990—present

Florian Gallenberger (born 23 February 1972 in Munich) is a German film director and writer. His film Quiero ser (I want to be...) was awarded the Academy Award for Best Live Action Short Film in 2001.

== Career ==
Gallenberger appeared in various roles in feature films, TV productions and theater plays from the age of five. From 1992 to 1999, he studied Direction at the University of Television and Film Munich. In 2001, he won the Honorary Foreign Film Award at the Student Academy Awards and an Oscar in the Best Live Action Short Film category for his short film Quiero Ser which is set in Mexico.

In 2004, he made his first feature-length film Shadows of Time starring Indian actors Tannishtha Chatterjee, Prashant Narayanan and Irrfan Khan. The romantic story, written by Gallenberger himself, was spread across 6 decades, beginning in pre-independent India in the 40s. Gallenberger set the film in India and made it entirely in Bengali language to maintain authenticity. He also hired a Bengali communicator for a crash course in the language for non-Bengali members of the 100-member crew.

In 2007, Gallenberger began production of a Chinese-French-German biopictorial film on the wartime experiences of John Rabe, a German businessman who used his Nazi party membership to establish a Safety Zone in Nanjing and save over 200,000 Chinese from the Nanjing massacre during the Second Sino-Japanese War. The story is based upon Rabe's wartime diaries. It premiered at the 59th Berlin Film Festival on 7 February 2009. The film picked up over seven German Film Awards nominations, including Best Film and Best Director.

He is a member of Mensa International.

== Filmography ==
Feature Films

- Honolulu (2001/anthology film)
- Shadows of Time (2004)
- John Rabe (2009)
- Colonia (2015)
- As Green As It Gets (2018)
- Der Überläufer (2020)

Short Films

- Der Schlag ans Hoftor (1990)
- Mysterium einer Notdurftanstalt (1993)
- Tango Berlin (1997)
- Hure (1997)
- Buck (1997)
- Quiero ser (I want to be...) (1999)

== Awards and nominations ==
Won

- 2000: Student Academy Award for Best Foreign Film - Quiero ser (I want to be...)
- 2001: Academy Award for Best Live Action Short Film - Quiero ser (I want to be...)
- 2005: Bavarian Film Award for Best New Director - Schatten der Zeit

Nominated

- 2005: Best Film (Golden Star) at the International Film Festival of Marrakech - Schatten der Zeit
