= Sachin Gupta =

Sachin Gupta may refer to:

- Sachin Gupta (academic) (fl. 1993–2023), marketing science academic
- Sachin Gupta (director) (born 1978), Indian film director and theater personality
- Sachin Gupta (executive) (born 1982), American sports executive
- Sachin Gupta (musician) (born 1981), Indian music director
- Sachin Gupta (singer) (fl. 1948–1957), Bengali singer who performed on soundtracks to Nastaneer and Basu Paribaar.
