= Laurent Ferlet =

French classical pianist, arranger and composer

Laurent Ferlet (born 5 October 1961) in Paris is a French classical pianist, arranger and composer with a focus on film music.

== Career ==
Ferlet studied the piano at the Conservatoire de Paris with Pierre Sancan. He achieved diplomas in concert playing and harmonic analysis from the École Normale de Musique de Paris, studying with Jean Fassina and Miriam Ribicki. He studied further at the Berklee School of Music in Boston for two years, specialising on film music. He became interested in jazz and chamber music.

He composed scores for documentaries and television series. In concert, he is focused on four-hand piano music. He composed the anthem, Envoyé spécial, Nicolas Sarkozy's 2012 presidential campaign.

== Filmography ==
=== Film ===
Ferlet composed music for film including:

- Le seigneur des aigles (1991)
- Hanuman (1998)
- Meerkat Manor: The Story Begins (2008)
- Sur le chemin de l'école (On the Way to School) (2013)
- Bären (2014)
- Peru – Eine Jugend zwischen Urwald und Großstadt (2018)
- A Child's Smile (2018)
- Gogo (2019)

=== Television ===
- Une femme d'honneur (1996-2008)
