= Tiger 3 (soundtrack) =

- Soundtrack album cover

Soundtrack album by Pritam
- Released: 20 November 2023
- Recorded: 2021–2023
- Studios: YRF Studios, Mumbai
- Genre: Feature film soundtrack
- Length: 21:09
- Language: Hindi
- Label: YRF Music
- Producer: Aditya Chopra

Pritam chronology
The Great Indian Family (2023)	Tiger 3 (2023)	Dunki (2023)
External audio
- Tiger 3 Audio Jukebox on YouTube

Singles from Tiger 3
- 1. "Leke Prabhu Ka Naam" Released: 19 October 2023; 2. "Ruaan" Released: 25 October 2023

Tiger 3 is the soundtrack album to the 2023 film of the same name directed by Maneesh Sharma and produced by Aditya Chopra under Yash Raj Films. The fifth instalment in the YRF Spy Universe and a circumquel to Ek Tha Tiger (2012) and Tiger Zinda Hai (2017), the film stars Salman Khan and Katrina Kaif, reprising their roles from the predecessors and Emraan Hashmi as the antagonist. Pritam composed two songs for the film, which were written by Amitabh Bhattacharya and Irshad Kamil. Tanuj Tiku composed the film score.

The soundtrack accompanies the two tracks composed by Pritam, and six themes produced and curated by Tiku. Pritam's compositions were released separately as singles, and the album was released by YRF Music on 20 November 2023.

== Development ==
In March 2021, it was announced that Pritam would compose the soundtrack for Tiger 3. He would be the third composer in the spy universe, following Sohail Sen and Sajid–Wajid for Ek Tha Tiger (2012; for which he was initially under consideration but had to opt out owing to commitment conflicts with Dhoom 3) and Vishal–Shekhar for Tiger Zinda Hai (2017), War (2019) and Pathaan (2023). The film also marked Pritam's fourth collaboration with Khan after Ready and Bodyguard (both 2011), Bajrangi Bhaijaan (2015) and Tubelight (2017) and first with Sharma. Tanuj Tiku composed the film score, replacing Julius Packiam who scored the predecessors.

Pritam started working on the film's songs by March 2021 where most of the tracks are in the urban space and produced two tracks during the COVID-19 pandemic. Initially, Vishal–Shekhar were originally considered to score Tiger 3 after they did the same for Tiger Zinda Hai. But as the duo already had signed for Pathaan, Chopra decided to rope Pritam so that it would provide a distinct touch for the spy universe films. Chopra further invested a considerable amount of budget to shoot the songs in grand scale with Khan and Kaif.

On 19 October 2023, singer Arijit Singh announced that he would record his first song for Khan after his dispute with the actor at an award show in 2014, which led to him being barred from performing vocals for Khan's films. Singh further recorded two of the tracks from the album: "Leke Prabhu Ka Naam" and "Ruaan". Pritam advocated to Sharma on composing a romantic number for Hashmi's character, despite being the film's antagonist, as he shared a successful track record with the actor on his compositions, which were romantic melodies. However, the track did not materialize.

== Release ==
The Tiger 3 soundtrack was preceded by three singles: The song "Leke Prabhu Ka Naam" was released as single, on the same day, as Singh's announcement on 19 October 2023. It was performed by Singh and Nikhita Gandhi with lyrics written by Bhattacharya. The second single "Ruaan", a romantic number sung by Singh and written by Kamil, was released on 25 October.

The soundtrack was released through YRF Music on 28 October, that included the earlier released singles. On 18 November, four tracks were included to the album, which were the compositions from the background score by Tanuj Tiku. This includes the main theme, "Tiger x Zoya Theme", "Aatish's Theme" and "Tiger x Pathaan Theme". The main theme featured Julius Packiam's theme from the first film being incorporated as well as in "Tiger x Pathaan Theme" that also had Sanchit and Ankit Balhara's theme from Pathaan. Also released as a part of an extended soundtrack is the "Tiger 3 x War 2 Theme" that was composed for the upcoming film War 2 (2025) by Sanchit and Ankit Balhara. It was separately released as a single on 24 November 2023.

== Track listing ==
=== Hindi ===
No.	Title	Lyrics	Music	Singer(s)	Length
1.	"Leke Prabhu Ka Naam"	Amitabh Bhattacharya	Pritam	Arijit Singh, Nikhita Gandhi	3:35
2.	"Ruaan"	Irshad Kamil	Pritam	Arijit Singh	4:17
3.	"Tiger 3 Theme"	—	Tanuj Tiku, Julius Packiam	Instrumental	3:42
4.	"Tiger x Zoya Theme"	—	Tanuj Tiku	Abhishek Nailwal	2:52
5.	"Aatish’s Theme"	—	Tanuj Tiku	Instrumental	2:27
6.	"Tiger x Pathaan Theme"	—	Tanuj Tiku, Julius Packiam, Sanchit Balhara, Ankit Balhara	Instrumental	4:16
Total length:					21:12

Extended soundtrack
No.	Title	Lyrics	Music	Singer(s)	Length
7.	"Tiger 3 x War 2 Theme"	—	Tanuj Tiku, Sanchit Balhara, Ankit Balhara	Instrumental	2:23
Total length:					23:35

Non-album Singles
No.	Title	Lyrics	Music	Singer(s)	Length
1.	"Tiger Ka Message"	—	Tanuj Tiku, Anckur Chaudhry	Salman Khan	1:43
2.	"Tiger 3" (Official Trailer)	—	Tanuj Tiku, Anckur Chaudhry	Instrumental	2:51
Total length:					4:34

=== Tamil ===
No.	Title	Lyrics	Music	Singer(s)	Length
1.	"Tiger Partyla Naam"	Madhan Karky	Pritam	Benny Dayal, Anusha Mani	3:35
2.	"Uyirula Ula"	Madhan Karky	Pritam	Abhay Jodhpurkar	4:17
3.	"Tiger 3 Theme"	—	Tanuj Tiku, Julius Packiam	Instrumental	3:42
4.	"Tiger x Zoya Theme"	—	Tanuj Tiku	Abhishek Nailwal	2:52
5.	"Aatish’s Theme"	—	Tanuj Tiku	Instrumental	2:27
6.	"Tiger x Pathaan Theme"	—	Tanuj Tiku, Julius Packiam, Sanchit Balhara, Ankit Balhara	Instrumental	4:16
Total length:					21:09

=== Telugu ===
No.	Title	Lyrics	Music	Singer(s)	Length
1.	"Yegire Manasey"	Chandrabose	Pritam	Benny Dayal, Anusha Mani	3:35
2.	"Prathi Kanam Kanam"	Chandrabose	Pritam	Abhay Jodhpurkar	4:17
3.	"Tiger 3 Theme"	—	Tanuj Tiku, Julius Packiam	Instrumental	3:42
4.	"Tiger x Zoya Theme"	—	Tanuj Tiku	Abhishek Nailwal	2:52
5.	"Aatish’s Theme"	—	Tanuj Tiku	Instrumental	2:27
6.	"Tiger x Pathaan Theme"	—	Tanuj Tiku, Julius Packiam, Sanchit Balhara, Ankit Balhara	Instrumental	4:16
Total length:					21:09

== Reception ==
Shomini Sen of Wion wrote "The music by Pritam is extremely average even though it has Arijit Singh doing playback for Salman Khan for the first time." According to Himesh Mankad of Pinkvilla, "Both Ek Tha Tiger and Tiger Zinda Hai had chartbuster music score, and Pritam is not able to match the legacy of earlier two films." Taran Adarsh of Bollywood Hungama stated "Pritam's music isn't impressive". Ronak Kotecha of The Times of India wrote "Pritam’s music falls short of leaving a lasting impact".

== Personnel ==
Credits adapted from YRF Music

- Pritam – composer (tracks: 1, 2)
- Tanuj Tiku – composer (tracks: 3, 4, 5, 6, 7), producer (tracks: 3, 4, 5, 6, 7), mixing (tracks: 3, 4, 5, 6, 7), mastering (tracks: 3, 4, 5, 6, 7)
- Julius Packiam – original composition (Tiger theme) [tracks: 3, 6]
- Sanchit Balhara – original compositions (Pathaan theme and War 2 theme) [tracks: 6, 7]
- Ankit Balhara – original compositions (Pathaan theme and War 2 theme) [tracks: 6, 7]
- Joel Crasto – additional music (tracks: 3, 6, 7)
- Mayur Hegde – additional music (tracks: 3, 4, 6, 7)
- AM.AN – musical arrangements (track: 1), programming (track: 1)
- Karan Kanchan – programming (track: 1)
- Sunny M. R. – sound design (tracks: 1, 2), musical arrangements (track: 2), programming (track: 2), vocal design (track: 1)
- Prasad S. – musical arrangements (track: 2), programming (track: 2)
- Meghdeep Bose – musical arrangements (track: 2), programming (track: 2)
- Tushar Joshi – musical arrangements (track: 2), programming (track: 2), vocal design (track: 2)
- D. J. Phukan – sound design (track: 1), vocal design (track: 1)
- Ashwin Kulkarni – sound design (track: 1), chief sound engineer (tracks: 1, 2), shootmix (tracks: 1, 2), chorus (track: 1)
- Pranav Gupta – sound engineer (tracks: 1, 2)
- Aniruddh Anantha – sound engineer (tracks: 1, 2), vocal conductor (tracks: 1, 2), chorus (track: 1), vocal design (track: 2)
- Dev Arijit – vocal conductor (tracks: 1, 2), vocal design (track: 2)
- Antara Mitra – vocal conductor (track: 1)
- Yonnie Dror – mijwiz (track: 1)
- Hasan Minawi – mijwiz (track: 1)
- Ara Dinkjian – oud (track: 1)
- Tamer Pinarbasi – kanun (track: 1)
- Mehmet Akatay – percussion (track: 1)
- Naveen Kumar – flute (track: 2)
- Suresh Lalwani – violin (track: 2)
- Roland Fernandes – electric guitar (tracks: 2, 3, 5, 6, 7), acoustic guitar (tracks: 2, 3, 5)
- Ishteyak Khan – tabla (track: 2), dholak (track: 2)
- Mustak Khan – tabla (track: 2), dholak (track: 2)
- Prasad Padhye – tabla (track: 2), dholak (track: 2)
- Sandro Friedrich – zurma (track: 5)
- Budapest Film Orchestra – (tracks: 6, 7)
- James Yan – lead orchestrator (tracks: 6, 7)
- Daryl Griffith – orchestrator (tracks: 6, 7)
- Dora Kmezić – orchestrator (tracks: 6, 7)
- Seb Skelly – orchestrator (tracks: 6, 7)
- Thomas Curran – orchestrator (tracks: 6, 7)
- Krisztián Balassa – session conductor (tracks: 6, 7), session producer (tracks: 6, 7)
- CLMusic – contractor (tracks: 6, 7)
- Vijay Dayal – recording engineer (YRF Studios, Mumbai) [tracks: 1, 2], mixing engineer (tracks: 1, 2)
- Chinmay Mestry – recording engineer (YRF Studios, Mumbai) [tracks: 1, 2], mixing engineer (tracks: 1, 2)
- Abhishek Khandelwal – recording engineer (YRF Studios, Mumbai) [tracks: 3, 4, 5, 6, 7]
- Dileep Nair – recording engineer (YRF Studios, Mumbai) [tracks: 3, 4, 5, 6, 7]
- Péter Barabás – recording engineer (Tom Tom Láng, Budapest) [tracks: 6, 7]
- Gergő Láposi – recording engineer (Tom Tom Láng, Budapest) [tracks: 6, 7]
- Donal Whelan – mastering engineer (Haford Mastering, Wales, United Kingdom) [tracks: 1, 2]
- Wes Hicks – mastering engineer (Haford Mastering, Wales, United Kingdom) [tracks: 3, 4, 5, 6, 7], score editor (tracks: 3, 4, 5, 6, 7)
- Ben Griffin – score editor (tracks: 3, 4, 5, 6, 7)
- James Yan – score editor (tracks: 3, 4, 5, 6, 7)
- Seth Taylor – score editor (tracks: 3, 4, 5, 6, 7)
- Anurag Sharma – music production manager
- Jaibir Singh – studio assistance
- Het Sanghvi – studio assistance
