= War 2 (soundtrack) =

- Soundtrack album cover

Soundtrack album by Pritam, Sanchit Balhara and Ankit Balhara
- Released: 16 August 2025
- Recorded: 2024–2025
- Studios: YRF Studios, Mumbai
- Genre: Feature film soundtrack
- Length: 22:01
- Language: Hindi
- Label: YRF Music
- Producers: Sunny M. R.; Vaibhav Pani; AM.AN; Meghdeep Bose; DJ Phukan
External audio
- Official Audio Jukebox on YouTube

Singles from War 2
- 1. "Aavan Jaavan" Released: 31 July 2025; 2. "Janaab-e-Aali" Released: 14 August 2025

War 2 is the soundtrack album to the 2025 film of the same name directed by Ayan Mukerji and produced by Aditya Chopra under Yash Raj Films. The sixth instalment in the YRF Spy Universe and a circumquel to War (2019), the film stars Hrithik Roshan reprising his role from the predecessor alongside N. T. Rama Rao Jr. and Kiara Advani. The soundtrack was composed by Pritam, with features lyrics written by Amitabh Bhattacharya. Sanchit Balhara and Ankit Balhara composed the film score.

The soundtrack accompanied the four tracks composed by Pritam, and four themes produced and curated by Sanchit and Ankit Balhara. Pritam's compositions were released separately as singles, and the album was released by YRF Music on 16 August 2025.

== Development ==
In March 2024, it was announced that Pritam would compose the soundtrack for War 2, marking his second film in the YRF Spy Universe following Tiger 3 (2023). It also marked his second collaboration with Hrithik Roshan after Dhoom 2 (2006) and third with Mukerji after Yeh Jawaani Hai Deewani (2013) and Brahmāstra: Part One – Shiva (2022). Sanchit Balhara and Ankit Balhara were retained to compose the film score, marking their second collaboration with Pritam after Kalank (2019), and third film in the universe after War (2019) and Pathaan (2023).

The first single "Aavan Jaavan" choreographed by Bosco Martis featuring Roshan and Advani, was shot in September 2024 in Italy's Venice, Lake Como, Naples, Tuscany, Sorrento Peninsula and the Amalfi Coast.

The second single "Janaab-e-Aali" featuring Roshan and Rao, also choreographed by Martis, was scheduled to be filmed in March 2025 featuring more than 500 background dancers; however, it was delayed after Roshan sustained a leg injury during the rehearsals. It was later filmed in the first week of July 2025 in Mumbai.

The third single "Jeete Jeete" sung by Jubin Nautiyal, focused on the childhood friendship of both the characters of Roshan and Rao. Another composition composed by Pritam titled "Tripping High" serves as a party single with its beats being merged with the song "Janaab-e-Aali".

== Release ==
The first single titled "Aavan Jaavan" featuring Roshan and Advani and sung by Arijit Singh and Nikhita Gandhi was released on 31 July 2025, coinciding with Advani's 34th birthday. The second single titled "Janaab-e-Aali" was teased on 7 August 2025. However, the full song was premiered in theaters along with the film. The full audio of the song was also released on 14 August 2025 while the full video was released digitally on 20 August 2025. The soundtrack was released through YRF Music on 16 August, that included the earlier released singles. Four tracks were also included to the album, which were the compositions from the background score given by the Balhara brothers. This included the "Shaitan" song which was specially composed for NTR's character and had Telugu lyrics in all versions, alongside "Kabir Theme Reloaded", "War Theme 2.0" and "Raghu & Kaboo Theme".

== Reception ==
Kusumika Das from Times Now praised the film's music especially "Janaab-e-Aali" for its choreography and performance of both stars. A reviewer from Bollywood Hungama found Pritam's music to be average, with "Aavan Jaavan" to be non-enticing while "Janaab-e-Aali" standing out. However, the background score by Balhara brothers was praised. Titas Chowdhury of News18 praised the film's pumping background music, however she criticized the placing of songs in the film and considered them more as plot hurdles. Vineeta Kumar from India Today criticized the film's song for being poorly placed and found background music to be unimpressive. Mayur Sanap from Rediff praised the adrenaline thumping score by Balhara brothers however he called Pritam's music as strictly functional.

== Track listing ==
=== Hindi ===
| No. | Title | Lyrics | Music | Singer(s) | Length |
|---|---|---|---|---|---|
| 1. | "Janaab-e-Aali" | Amitabh Bhattacharya | Pritam | Sachet Tandon, Saaj Bhatt | 3:35 |
| 2. | "Aavan Jaavan" | Amitabh Bhattacharya | Pritam | Arijit Singh, Nikhita Gandhi | 3:45 |
| 3. | "Jeete Jeete" | Amitabh Bhattacharya | Pritam | Jubin Nautiyal | 3:10 |
| 4. | "Shaitan" | Roll Rida | Sanchit Balhara and Ankit Balhara | Roll Rida, Riya Duggal | 3:16 |
| 5. | "Kabir Theme Reloaded" | Instrumental | Sanchit Balhara and Ankit Balhara | Instrumental | 1:29 |
| 6. | "War Theme 2.0" | Instrumental | Sanchit Balhara and Ankit Balhara | Instrumental | 2:02 |
| 7. | "Raghu & Kaboo Theme" | Instrumental | Sanchit Balhara and Ankit Balhara | Instrumental | 1:56 |
| 8. | "Tripping High" | Tsumyoki, Brianna Supriyo, RANJ, Shreya Phukan | Pritam | Tsumyoki, Raghav Chaitanya, Poorvi Koutish, Brianna Supriyo, RANJ, Saaj Bhatt, Shreya Phukan, Dev Arijit | 2:48 |
| Total length: | | | | | 22:01 |

Non-album single
| No. | Title | Lyrics | Music | Singer(s) | Length |
|---|---|---|---|---|---|
| 1. | "War 2 Teaser" | Instrumental | Sanchit Balhara and Ankit Balhara | – | 1:34 |

=== Telugu ===
| No. | Title | Lyrics | Music | Singer(s) | Length |
|---|---|---|---|---|---|
| 1. | "Salam Anali" | Krishna Kanth | Pritam | Nakash Aziz, Yazin Nizar | 3:35 |
| 2. | "Oopiri Ooyalaga" | Chandrabose | Pritam | Shashwat Singh, Nikhita Gandhi | 3:45 |
| 3. | "Nuvvunte Naatho" | Chandrabose | Pritam | Haricharan | 3:09 |
| 4. | "Shaitan" | Roll Rida | Sanchit Balhara and Ankit Balhara | Roll Rida, Riya Duggal | 3:14 |
| 5. | "Kabir Theme Reloaded" | Instrumental | Sanchit Balhara and Ankit Balhara | Instrumental | 1:29 |
| 6. | "War Theme 2.0" | Instrumental | Sanchit Balhara and Ankit Balhara | Instrumental | 2:00 |
| 7. | "Raghu & Kaboo Theme" | Instrumental | Sanchit Balhara and Ankit Balhara | Instrumental | 1:53 |
| 8. | "Tripping High" | Tsumyoki, Brianna Supriyo, RANJ, Shreya Phukan | Pritam | Tsumyoki, Raghav Chaitanya, Poorvi Koutish, Brianna Supriyo, RANJ, Yazin Nizar, Shreya Phukan, Dev Arijit | 2:46 |
| Total length: | | | | | 22:01 |

=== Tamil ===
| No. | Title | Lyrics | Music | Singer(s) | Length |
|---|---|---|---|---|---|
| 1. | "Kalaaba" | Madhan Karky | Pritam | Nakash Aziz, Yazin Nizar | 3:35 |
| 2. | "Ulagena Uruveduthaay" | Madhan Karky | Pritam | Shashwat Singh, Nikhita Gandhi | 3:45 |
| 3. | "Hey Nanba Nanba" | Madhan Karky | Pritam | Haricharan | 3:09 |
| 4. | "Shaitan" | Roll Rida | Sanchit Balhara and Ankit Balhara | Roll Rida, Riya Duggal | 3:14 |
| 5. | "Kabir Theme Reloaded" | Instrumental | Sanchit Balhara and Ankit Balhara | Instrumental | 1:29 |
| 6. | "War Theme 2.0" | Instrumental | Sanchit Balhara and Ankit Balhara | Instrumental | 2:00 |
| 7. | "Raghu & Kaboo Theme" | Instrumental | Sanchit Balhara and Ankit Balhara | Instrumental | 1:53 |
| 8. | "Tripping High" | Tsumyoki, Brianna Supriyo, RANJ, Shreya Phukan | Pritam | Tsumyoki, Raghav Chaitanya, Poorvi Koutish, Brianna Supriyo, RANJ, Yazin Nizar, Shreya Phukan, Dev Arijit | 2:46 |
| Total length: | | | | | 22:01 |

== Album credits ==
Credits are adapted from YRF Music.

- Music composers: Pritam (tracks 1, 3, 8), Sanchit Balhara and Ankit Balhara (tracks 4, 5, 6, 7)
- Lyricists: Amitabh Bhattacharya (tracks 1, 2, 3), Roll Rida (track 4), Tsumyoki, Brianna Supriyo, RANJ, Shreya Phukan (track 8)
- Music production & arrangement: AM. AN (track 1, 8), Sunny M. R, Vaibhav Pani (track 2), Meghdeep Bose (track 3), DJ Phukan (tracks 1–3)
- Mix and mastering engineers: Shadab Rayeen at NewEdge (track 2), Donal Whelan at Hafod Mastering, Wales UK (track 1, 3, 8), Abhishek Ghatak (4, 5, 6, 7)
- Recording engineers: Pranav Gupta, Aniruddh Anantha, Dev Arijit, Akash Mukherjee (tracks 1, 2, 3), Vijay Dayal, Abhishek Khandelwal (tracks 4, 5, 6, 7)
- Creative advisor: Manoj Juloori (track 4)
- Music production manager: Brianna Supriyo (tracks 1, 2, 3)
