= War 2 =

War 2 may refer to:

- War 2 (film), a 2025 Indian film
  - War 2 (soundtrack), soundtrack album by Pritam, Sanchit Balhara and Ankit Balhara
- War II (comics), a Marvel comics character
- World War II, a 1939–1945 global conflict
