= YRF Spy Universe =

Shared fictional universe

- Official logo
- Created by: Aditya Chopra
- Original work: Ek Tha Tiger (2012)
- Owner: Yash Raj Films
- Years: 2012–present

Print publications
- Comics: Ek Tha Tiger: Saving The High Seas (2012); Ek Tha Tiger: Caught In The Web (2012)

Films and television
- Films: Ek Tha Tiger (2012); Tiger Zinda Hai (2017); War (2019); Pathaan (2023); Tiger 3 (2023); War 2 (2025); Alpha (2026)

Games
- Video game(s): Ek Tha Tiger (2012); Tiger The Bhai (2012); Being SalMan: The Official Game (2016)

Audio
- Soundtracks: Ek Tha Tiger; Tiger Zinda Hai; War; Pathaan; Tiger 3 War 2
- Original music: "Ghungroo"; "Besharam Rang"; "Jhoome Jo Pathaan"

Miscellaneous
- Budget: Total (7 films): est. ₹1205–1305 crore
- Box office: Total (7 films): est. ₹3194.97–3242.75 crore

YRF Spy Universe is an Indian media franchise and shared universe centered on a series of spy action films, which feature various fictional R&AW agents. The first three films in the universe - Ek Tha Tiger (2012), Tiger Zinda Hai (2017) and War (2019) - were released as standalone films before the universe was established through Pathaan (2023) after the success of War. The franchise also includes comic books, graphic novels and video games. The films are created, produced and distributed by Yash Raj Films.

== Overview ==
The first film Ek Tha Tiger (2012) directed by Kabir Khan was centered on a fictional RAW agent named Avinash Singh Rathore alias Tiger played by Salman Khan. This was followed by its sequels Tiger Zinda Hai (2017) directed by Ali Abbas Zafar and the fifth film in the universe Tiger 3 (2023) directed by Maneesh Sharma. The third film War (2019) directed by Siddharth Anand, starring Hrithik Roshan and Tiger Shroff was released as a standalone film with no connection to the Tiger films. The universe was created when Aditya Chopra and Siddharth Anand decided to connect the three films and create a shared universe through crossovers with characters and connecting plot lines. The fourth installment Pathaan (2023), also directed by Anand, starring Shah Rukh Khan, was the first film in the universe to feature characters from the previous films. The sixth installment War 2 (2025), directed by Ayan Mukerji, continues the storyline established in War.

== Films ==
=== Released films ===
| Title | Release date | Director | Producer | Screenwriter(s) |
|---|---|---|---|---|
| Ek Tha Tiger | 15 August 2012 | Kabir Khan | Aditya Chopra | Kabir Khan; Neelesh Misra; Aditya Chopra |
| Tiger Zinda Hai | 22 December 2017 | Ali Abbas Zafar | Aditya Chopra | Ali Abbas Zafar; Neelesh Misra |
| War | 2 October 2019 | Siddharth Anand | Aditya Chopra | Shridhar Raghavan; Siddharth Anand; Aditya Chopra; Abbas Tyrewala |
| Pathaan | 25 January 2023 | Siddharth Anand | Aditya Chopra | Shridhar Raghavan; Siddharth Anand; Abbas Tyrewala |
| Tiger 3 | 12 November 2023 | Maneesh Sharma | Aditya Chopra | Shridhar Raghavan; Aditya Chopra; Anckur Chaudhry |
| War 2 | 14 August 2025 | Ayan Mukerji | Aditya Chopra | Shridhar Raghavan; Aditya Chopra; Abbas Tyrewala |
| Alpha | 3 July 2026 | Shiv Rawail | Aditya Chopra | Soumil Shukla; Shridhar Raghavan; Uday Chopra; Ishita Moitra |

==== Ek Tha Tiger (2012) ====
RAW agent Avinash "Tiger" Singh Rathore, is sent to Dublin to observe an Indian scientist who is suspected of sharing nuclear secrets with the ISI. He meets and falls for his caretaker Zoya Nazar, a girl with a dark past.

Ek Tha Tiger is the first instalment of the shared universe and was released on 15 August 2012 worldwide. The film earned ₹325 crore worldwide against a budget of ₹75 crore, becoming one of the highest-grossing Bollywood films by international gross.

==== Tiger Zinda Hai (2017) ====
Tiger and Zoya rejoin forces with RAW and ISI in order to rescue a group of nurses, who are held hostage by ISC, an Iraqi terrorist organisation headed by Abu Usman.

Tiger Zinda Hai is the second instalment of the shared universe, and is based on true incidents that happened in 2014 the abduction of Indian nurses by ISIL. Tiger Zinda Hai was released on 22 December 2017 and made a new non-holiday record in India as it collected ₹34.1 crore nett on its first day. It went on to collect ₹35.30 crores gross on the second day. The film recorded the second-highest day of all time. It netted Rs 154 crore in its first four days in India. The film grossed ₹565 crore worldwide becoming one of the highest-grossing Indian film. At the 63rd Filmfare Awards, it won for Best Action.

==== War (2019) ====
Major Kabir Dhaliwal, a former soldier and a skilled agent, goes rogue after a mission to catch a terrorist named Rizwan Ilyasi goes awry. However, his boss sends Khalid, another soldier and Kabir's student to track him down.

War is the third installment of the shared universe, which was commissioned after the success of the previous films, and was directed by Siddharth Anand, starring Hrithik Roshan, Tiger Shroff and Vaani Kapoor in lead roles. It was released on 2 October 2019, coinciding with the Gandhi Jayanti. Proving to be similarly successful to the first entry in the series, the film emerged as a huge box office success, becoming the highest-grossing Bollywood film of 2019 and one of the highest-grossing Indian films of all time.

==== Pathaan (2023) ====
Pathaan, an exiled RAW agent is assigned to take down Jim, a former RAW agent-turned-leader of "Outfit X", a private terror organization that is planning to spread a deadly lab-generated virus dubbed "Raktbeej" across India.

Pathaan is the fourth installment in the shared universe directed by Siddharth Anand, and the first spy universe film to feature a mid-credits scene. The film stars Shah Rukh Khan, Deepika Padukone and John Abraham in the lead roles. Salman Khan reprises his role as Avinash "Tiger" Singh Rathore in a cameo appearance. It was made on a budget of ₹250 crore, and was a major commercial success, making it the highest-grossing film in the universe.

==== Tiger 3 (2023) ====
Tiger and Zoya must go on a life-threatening crusade to clear their names after they are framed as traitors by Aatish Rehman, an ex-ISI agent turned terrorist with a personal vendetta against Tiger.

Tiger 3 is the fifth installment of the shared universe and sequel to Tiger Zinda Hai. It features Salman Khan and Katrina Kaif, reprising their eponymous roles of Tiger and Zoya, with Emraan Hashmi playing the antagonist. Shah Rukh Khan and Hrithik Roshan reprise their roles as Pathaan and Major Kabir Dhaliwal in cameo appearances. The film was directed by Maneesh Sharma. The music was composed by Pritam, with lyrics written by Irshad Kamil and Amitabh Bhattacharya. It was made on a budget on ₹300 crore, making it the second most expensive film in the universe, behind War 2.

==== War 2 (2025) ====
Kabir Dhaliwal, a former RAW agent, who, after going rogue, becomes a major threat to national security, and a special units officer, Vikram Chelapathi, is assigned to neutralize him.

War 2 is the sixth installment of the shared universe and sequel to War. The film stars Hrithik Roshan, who reprises his role, with N. T. Rama Rao Jr, Kiara Advani and Anil Kapoor with Bobby Deol in a cameo appearance. Principal photography commenced in October 2023. The film was directed by Ayan Mukerji, replacing Siddharth Anand. Made on a budget of ₹400 crore, it is the most expensive film in the universe. It was theatrically released worldwide on 14 August 2025.

==== Alpha (2026) ====
Sita, a highly trained assassin raised in isolation as a super-soldier by rogue commander Fateh Singh Lakhawat, she discovers the dark truth about her family and her stolen childhood. She teams up with her long lost sister Durga to take down her creator and his illicit military program.

The seventh installment of the shared universe and first female-led film in the universe was announced in July 2024, titled Alpha. Directed by Shiv Rawail, the film stars Alia Bhatt, Sharvari, Bobby Deol and Anil Kapoor, with Hrithik Roshan reprising his role as Kabir in a cameo appearance. Principal photography commenced in July 2024. It was initially scheduled for release on 25 December 2025 but was postponed to 17 April 2026 for post-production work. Alpha was postponed again due to the Salman Khan-starrer Maatrubhumi: May War Rest in Peace taking its second release date, though the latter would also be deferred from that release date due to production delays. The film was theatrically released on 3 July 2026.

=== Upcoming films ===
| Title | Release date | Director | Producer | Screenwriter(s) | Status |
|---|---|---|---|---|---|
| Pathaan 2 | TBA | TBA | Aditya Chopra | TBA | In development |

==== Pathaan 2 ====
The eighth installment of the shared universe and sequel to Pathaan was announced in February 2024. Shah Rukh Khan and Deepika Padukone will reprise their roles as Pathaan and Rubai.

==== Tiger vs Pathaan ====
In 2021, Salman Khan and Shah Rukh Khan were rumored to star together for a film. In December 2021, Salman Khan confirmed the rumors. In April 2023, the ninth installment of the shared universe Tiger vs Pathaan was announced. The project was reported to be directed by Siddharth Anand. However, later in February 2026 the project was eventually shelved due to budget constraints.

== Cast ==
| Character(s) | Actor | Films | | | | | | |
| Character(s) | Actor | Ek Tha Tiger (2012) | Tiger Zinda Hai (2017) | War (2019) | Pathaan (2023) | Tiger 3 (2023) | War 2 (2025) | Alpha (2026) |
|---|---|---|---|---|---|---|---|---|
| Avinash "Tiger" Singh Rathore | Salman Khan | Main | Main | | Guest | Main | | |
| Kabir Dhaliwal | Hrithik Roshan | | | Main | | Guest | Main | Guest |
| Pathaan | Shah Rukh Khan | | | | Main | Guest | | |
| Vikram "Raghu" Chelapathi | N. T. Rama Rao Jr. | | | | | | Main | |
| Zoya Nazar | Katrina Kaif | Main | Main | | | Main | | |
| Naina Sahni | Vaani Kapoor | | | Main | | | Flashback | |
| Rubai Mohsin | Deepika Padukone | | | | Main | | | |
| Kavya Luthra | Kiara Advani | | | | | | Main | |
| Sita | Alia Bhatt | | | | | | | Main |
| Durga Kaul | Sharvari Wagh | | | | | | | Main |
| Khalid Rahmani / Saurabh (Note: dual role) | Tiger Shroff | | | Main | | | Flashback | |
| Jim | John Abraham | | | | Main | | | |
| Aatish Rehman | Emraan Hashmi | | | | | Main | | |
| Fateh Singh Lakhawat / Zarrar Khan (Note: multiple names) | Bobby Deol | | | | | | Guest | Main |
| Vikrant Kaul | Anil Kapoor | | | | | | Main | Main |
| Ajit Shenoy | Girish Karnad | Supporting | Supporting | | | | | |
| Sunil Luthra | Ashutosh Rana | | | Supporting | Supporting | Guest | Supporting | |
| Nandini Grewal | Dimple Kapadia | | | | Supporting | | | |
| Maithili Menon | Revathi | | | | | Supporting | | |
| Nasreen Irani | Simran | | | | | Supporting | | |
| Gopi Arya | Ranvir Shorey | Supporting | | | | Supporting | | |
| Firdaus | Paresh Rawal | | Supporting | | | | | |
| Abrar Sheikh | Gavie Chahal | Supporting | Supporting | | | Supporting | | |
| Rakesh | Kumud Mishra | | Supporting | | | Supporting | | |
| Karan Rao | Anant Vidhaat Sharma | | Supporting | | | Supporting | | |
| Nikhil | Chandrachoor Rai | | | | | Supporting | | |
| Javed Baig | Danish Bhat | | Supporting | | | Supporting | | |
| Azaan Akbar | Paresh Pahuja | | Supporting | | | Flashback | | |
| Namit Khanna | Angad Bedi | | Supporting | | | Flashback | | |
| Poorna | Anupriya Goenka | | Supporting | | | | | |
| Aditi Nahta | Anupriya Goenka | | | Supporting | | | | |
| Shweta Bajaj | Ekta Kaul | | | | Supporting | | | |
| Raza | Shaji Choudhary | | | | Supporting | | | |
| Joseph Mathews | Diganta Hazarika | | | | Supporting | | | |
| Rishi Arya | Viraf Patel | | | | Supporting | | | |
| Amol | Aakash Bhatija | | | | Supporting | | | |
| Nafisa Rahmani | Soni Razdan | | | Supporting | | | Guest | |
| Hassan Ali | Jineet Rath | | Supporting | | | Flashback | | |
| Hassan Ali | Vishal Jethwa | | | | | Supporting | | |
| Junior | Sartaaj Kakkar | | Supporting | | | Supporting | | |
| Abu Usman | Sajjad Delafrooz | | Supporting | | | | | |
| Gautam Gulati | K. C. Shankar | | | | | | Supporting | |
| Vilasrao Sarang | Varun Badola | | | | | | Supporting | |
| Karan | Karan Kishore | | | | | | Supporting | Supporting |
| Imroz | Imroz Maur | | | | | | Supporting | |
| Ruhi Sahni | Dishita Sehgal | | | Supporting | | | | |
| Ruhi Sahni | Arista Mehta | | | | | | Supporting | |
| Janaki Kaul | Dia Mirza | | | | | | | Supporting |
| John Verghese | Dibyendu Bhattacharya | | | | | | | Supporting |
| Bhupen Rawat | Sangay Tsheltrim | | | | | | | Supporting |

== Characters ==
=== Tiger ===
Tiger
- YRF Spy Universe character
- Tiger in Tiger 3 (2023)
- First appearance: Ek Tha Tiger (2012)
- First game: Ek Tha Tiger
- Last appearance: Tiger 3 (2023)
- Created by: Aditya Chopra; Kabir Khan; Neelesh Misra
- Portrayed by: Salman Khan

In-universe information
- Full name: Avinash Singh Rathore
- Alias: Manish Chandra
- Nickname: Tiger
- Gender: Male
- Occupation: R&AW agent
- Affiliation: Research and Analysis Wing (R&AW)
- Significant other: Zoya
- Children: Hassan (adopted son, deceased); Junior (son)
- Nationality: Indian

Avinash Singh Rathore, known by his codename Tiger, is a RAW agent, portrayed by Salman Khan. The character is first introduced in Ek Tha Tiger, and is reprised in the sequels Tiger Zinda Hai and Tiger 3. Tiger is married to Zoya, another spy, and they have a son named Junior. He also makes a notable appearance in Pathaan (2023). Tiger is one of the three main agents in the universe, alongside Pathaan and Kabir.

=== Zoya ===
Zoya
- First appearance: Ek Tha Tiger (2012)
- Last appearance: Tiger 3 (2023)
- Created by: Aditya Chopra; Kabir Khan; Neelesh Misra
- Portrayed by: Katrina Kaif

In-universe information
- Full name: Zoya Nazar Jung
- Nickname: Zee
- Gender: Female
- Occupation: ISI agent
- Affiliation: Inter-Services Intelligence (ISI)
- Significant other: Avinash Singh Rathore "Tiger"
- Children: Hassan, Junior
- Origin: London, England
- Nationality: Pakistani

Zoya Nazar is a Pakistani ISI agent portrayed by Katrina Kaif. She defected from the ISI, after eloping with her love interest turned husband Tiger, an Indian RAW agent. However, she remains loyal to Pakistan and occasionally goes on missions to save her country from threats. She is married to Tiger and has two sons: an adopted son named Hassan, a suicide bomber whom she adopted during a mission in Iraq and a biological son named Junior.

=== Kabir ===
Kabir
- Kabir in War 2 (2025)
- First appearance: War (2019)
- Last appearance: Alpha (2026) (Note: Cameo appearance)
- Created by: Siddharth Anand; Shridhar Raghavan; Abbas Tyrewala; Aditya Chopra
- Portrayed by: Hrithik Roshan

In-universe information
- Full name: Kabir Dhaliwal
- Gender: Male
- Title: Major
- Occupation: RAW agent Indian Army Major
- Affiliation: Research and Analysis Wing (RAW); Indian Army
- Significant other: Kavya Luthra
- Children: Ruhi
- Home: Delhi
- Nationality: Indian

Major Kabir Dhaliwal is a RAW agent and former soldier, portrayed by Hrithik Roshan. He is first introduced in War and is initially believed to have gone rogue. However, it is later revealed that he is on a covert mission to stop a terrorist organization. He is the former mentor of Khalid and Saurabh, the latter of whom turned rogue. Despite being unmarried, he is the legal guardian to Ruhi, the daughter of his deceased partner, Naina. He is one of three main agents in the universe, along with Tiger and Pathaan. He was trained by Colonel Sunil Luthra and considered him as a father figure.

In his childhood, he became an orphan and befriended a boy named Raghu. The two became pickpockets, eventually ending up in a juvenile detention centre. One day, there are visited by Luthra who motivates them to join the Army. While Kabir gets selected, Raghu does not leading to him escaping in retaliation.

In his second mission, he infiltrates the Kali, a global syndicate that aims to control the Indian government. Agent Vikram Chelapathi is assigned to eliminate him, however he learns of Vikram's true intentions and defeats him. However, he spares him and convinces him to help him finish off Kali. The two promise to work together under the shadows.

=== Pathaan ===
Pathaan
- Pathaan in Pathaan (2023)
- First appearance: Pathaan (2023)
- Last appearance: Tiger 3 (2023)
- Created by: Aditya Chopra; Siddharth Anand; Shridhar Raghavan; Abbas Tyrewala
- Portrayed by: Shah Rukh Khan

In-universe information
- Full name: Pathaan
- Gender: Male
- Occupation: R&AW agent
- Affiliation: Joint Operations and Covert Research (J.O.C.R), Research and Analysis Wing (R&AW), Indian Army (former)
- Significant other: Rubina Mohsin
- Nationality: Indian

Pathaan is a RAW agent and former soldier portrayed by Shah Rukh Khan. He is first introduced in Pathaan (2023). In 2002, during a joint mission in Afghanistan to take down a Taliban leader, Pathaan saved the lives of 30 children and an elderly teacher (an Afghan/Pashtun) who gives him the name "Pathaan" for his bravery. He created Joint Operations and Covert Research (J.O.C.R), a sub-division of R&AW, that recruits Indian soldiers and agents who were forced to retire due to injury or emotional trauma. Rubina "Rubai" Mohsin, a Pakistani Inter-Services Intelligence agent, is his love interest, whom he met during a mission in Spain and Moscow. He is one of the three main agents in the universe, along with Tiger and Kabir.

=== Jim ===
Jim
- First appearance: Pathaan (2023)
- Created by: Siddharth Anand; Shridhar Raghavan; Abbas Tyrewala
- Portrayed by: John Abraham

In-universe information
- Gender: Male
- Occupation: Mercenary
- Affiliation: Outfit X Research and Analysis Wing (RAW; former); Indian Army (former)
- Nationality: Indian

Jim is the founder and leader of "Outfit X", a private terrorist organisation, portrayed by John Abraham. He is a former Indian RAW agent, who turned rogue after the Indian government refused to negotiate with Somalian terrorists in exchange for him and his pregnant wife. As a result, he faked his own death, founded Outfit X and began looking for an opportunity to take revenge on India. In 2019, Jim was hired by General Qadir of the Pakistan Army to plan a biological attack via a deadly synthetic virus on India and other parts of South Asia, locking horns with the agent Pathaan in the process. Rubina Mohsin, a Pakistani Inter-Services Intelligence agent was also in his team but later turned against him and fought alongside Pathaan and his team.

=== Rubai ===
Rubina Mohsin
- First appearance: Pathaan (2023)
- Created by: Siddharth Anand; Shridhar Raghavan; Abbas Tyrewala
- Portrayed by: Deepika Padukone

In-universe information
- Full name: Rubina Mohsin
- Nickname: Rubai
- Gender: Female
- Occupation: ISI agent Doctor (former)
- Affiliation: Inter-Service Intelligence
- Significant other: Pathaan
- Nationality: Pakistani

Rubina Mohsin, more commonly known by her nickname "Rubai", is a Pakistani ISI agent portrayed by Deepika Padukone. After her father was arrested and tortured, she became a doctor in Pakistan. Later she joined the ISI but defected, joining Outfit X a private terrorist organisation, but soon joined Pathaan to stop Jim from spreading a deadly virus across South Asia. Pathaan, an Indian RAW agent is her love interest, whom she had met in Spain.

=== Aatish ===
Aatish Rehman
- First appearance: Tiger 3 (2023)
- Created by: Maneesh Sharma; Shridhar Raghavan; Aditya Chopra
- Portrayed by: Emraan Hashmi

In-universe information
- Gender: Male
- Occupation: Deputy Director of ISI
- Affiliation: Inter-Services Intelligence (ISI; former)
- Significant other: Shaheen Baig
- Nationality: Pakistani

Aatish Rehman is a former Pakistani Deputy Director of the Inter-Services Intelligence (ISI), portrayed by Emraan Hashmi. He was a mentor to Zoya, and had in the past assigned his pregnant wife Shaheen, the task of killing an Indian General who was to sign a peace treaty with Pakistan; but his plan was ruined when she was killed by Tiger. Wanting revenge from Tiger and Zoya, he kidnaps their son Junior, and blackmails them to steal nuclear weapons codes and later frames them as traitors. He ultimately wants to bring dictatorship in Pakistan by dismissing the democratic government and assassinating the Prime Minister. His plans are later stopped by Tiger and his team.

=== Kavya ===
Kavya Luthra
- First appearance: War 2 (2025)
- Last appearance: –
- Created by: Ayan Mukerji; Shridhar Raghavan; Abbas Tyrewala; Aditya Chopra
- Portrayed by: Kiara Advani

In-universe information
- Gender: Female
- Occupation: Indian Air Force Wing Commander; RAW agent
- Affiliation: Indian Air Force; Research and Analysis Wing (RAW)
- Significant other: Kabir Dhaliwal
- Nationality: Indian

Kavya Luthra is a Wing Commander in the Indian Air Force, played by Kiara Advani. She is the daughter of Colonel Sunil Luthra and was once the love interest of Kabir. She had proposed to Kabir but he had declined due to his commitments to RAW. After Colonel Luthra gets killed by Kabir, she wants to exact revenge, but later, after Kabir reveals his true intentions, they work together to take down Vikram. She later reconciles with Kabir.

=== Vikram ===
Vikram
- Vikram in War 2 (2025)
- First appearance: War 2 (2025)
- Last appearance: –
- Created by: Ayan Mukerji; Shridhar Raghavan; Abbas Tyrewala; Aditya Chopra
- Portrayed by: N. T. Rama Rao Jr.

In-universe information
- Full name: Vikram Chelapathi
- Nickname: Raghu
- Gender: Male
- Occupation: RAW agent Indian Army Major
- Affiliation: Research and Analysis Wing (RAW); Indian Army
- Nationality: Indian

Major Vikram (Raghu) Chelapathi is a RAW agent played by N. T. Rama Rao Jr. He is the childhood friend of Kabir, and had mentored him. They both became pickpockets and ended up in a juvenile detention centre. There, they are visited by Colonel Sunil Luthra who motivates them to join the Army. Vikram, however does not get selected, leading to him escaping in retaliation. He eventually joins the Army and becomes a member of Kali. His plans however are stopped by Kabir who defeats him. However, he reedems himself and helps Kabir eliminate the remaining members of the cartel. Although he is declared dead in India, he promises to work with Kabir in the shadows.

=== Sita ===
Sita Kaul
- First appearance: Alpha (2026)
- Last appearance: –
- Created by: Shiv Rawail; Soumil Shukla; Shridhar Raghavan; Ishita Moitra; Aditya Chopra
- Portrayed by: Alia Bhatt

In-universe information
- Gender: Female
- Occupation: Assassin
- Affiliation: Research and Analysis Wing (RAW)
- Family: Vikrant Kaul (father); Durga Kaul (fraternal twin sister)
- Nationality: Indian

Sita is an assassin played by Alia Bhatt. The older twin daughter of Colonel Vikrant Kaul, she was raised in isolation and trained by Colonel Fateh Singh Lakhawat as part of a covert super-soldier program codenamed Alpha.

== Crew ==
| Occupation | Film | | | | | | |
| Occupation | Ek Tha Tiger (2012) | Tiger Zinda Hai (2017) | War (2019) | Pathaan (2023) | Tiger 3 (2023) | War 2 (2025) | Alpha (2026) |
|---|---|---|---|---|---|---|---|
| Director | Kabir Khan | Ali Abbas Zafar | Siddharth Anand | Siddharth Anand | Maneesh Sharma | Ayan Mukerji | Shiv Rawail |
| Producer | Aditya Chopra | Aditya Chopra | Aditya Chopra | Aditya Chopra | Aditya Chopra | Aditya Chopra | Aditya Chopra |
| Co-Producer | – | – | – | Akshaye Widhani | Akshaye Widhani | Akshaye Widhani | Akshaye Widhani |
| Screenplay | Kabir Khan; Neelesh Misra | Ali Abbas Zafar | Shridhar Raghavan; Siddharth Anand | Shridhar Raghavan | Shridhar Raghavan | Shridhar Raghavan | Soumil Shukla; Shridhar Raghavan |
| Dialogues | Kabir Khan; Neelesh Misra | Ali Abbas Zafar | Abbas Tyrewala | Abbas Tyrewala | Anckur Chaudhry | Abbas Tyrewala | Ishita Moitra |
| Story | Aditya Chopra | Ali Abbas Zafar; Neelesh Misra | Siddharth Anand; Aditya Chopra | Siddharth Anand | Aditya Chopra | Aditya Chopra | Uday Chopra |
| Cinematography | Aseem Mishra | Marcin Laskawiec | Benjamin Jasper | Satchith Paulose | Anay Goswamy | Benjamin Jasper | Rubais |
| Editor | Rameshwar S. Bhagat | Rameshwar S. Bhagat | Aarif Sheikh | Aarif Sheikh | Rameshwar S. Bhagat | Aarif Sheikh | Aarif Sheikh |
| Composer | Sohail Sen; Sajid-Wajid | Vishal–Shekhar | Vishal–Shekhar | Vishal–Shekhar | Pritam | Pritam | Rohansh & Abeer |
| Lyricist(s) | Neelesh Misra; Anvita Dutt; Kausar Munir | Irshad Kamil | Kumaar | Kumaar | Amitabh Bhattacharya; Irshad Kamil | Amitabh Bhattacharya | Kumaar; Anvita Dutt; Kausar Munir; Rohansh & Abeer |
| Background Score | Julius Packiam | Julius Packiam | Sanchit Balhara; Ankit Balhara | Sanchit Balhara; Ankit Balhara | Tanuj Tiku | Sanchit Balhara; Ankit Balhara | Sanchit Balhara; Ankit Balhara |
| Costume Designers | Alvira Khan Agnihotri; Ashley Rebello; Arun Chauhan; Anoushka Veljee | Alvira Khan Agnihotri; Ashley Rebello; Leepakshi Ellawadi | Anaita Shroff Adajania; Niharika Jolly | Shaleena Nathani; Mamta Anand; Niharika Jolly | Anaita Shroff Adajania; Alvira Khan Agnihotri; Ashley Rebello; Darshan Jalan | Anaita Shroff Adajania; Niharika Jolly | Aki Narula; Natasha Vohra; Gunpreet Kaur Mann; Deepali Singh Raseen |
| Action Directors | Conrad Palmisano | Tom Struthers | Paul Jennings; Oh Se-Yeong; Parvez Sheikh; Franz Spilhaus | Casey O'Neill; Craig Macrae; Sunil Rodrigues | Franz Spilhaus; Oh Se-Yeong; Sunil Rodrigues | Spiro Razatos; Franz Spilhaus; Anal Arasu; Oh Se-Yeong; Craig Macrae; Sunil Rodrigues | Craig Macrae; Sunil Rodrigues |
| Choreographer(s) | Vaibhavi Merchant; Ahmed Khan | Vaibhavi Merchant | Bosco-Caesar; Tushar Kalia | Bosco-Caesar; Vaibhavi Merchant | Vaibhavi Merchant | Bosco Martis | Vijay Ganguly; Bosco Martis |
| Production Designer(s) | Sukant Panigrahy | Rajnish Hedao; Snigdha Basu; Sumit Basu | Rajat Poddar | Rajat Poddar | Mayur Sharma | Rajat Poddar; Amrita Mahal | Subrata Chakraborty; Amit Ray |
| Executive Producer(s) | Aashish Singh | — | Padam Bhushan | Padam Bhushan | Sudhanshu Kumar; Sanjay Shivalkar | Sanjay Shivalkar | Padam Bhushan |
| Associate Producer | — | Aashish Singh | — | — | Rishabh Chopra | Rishabh Chopra | Rishabh Chopra |
| Sound Designer(s) | Debashish Mishra; Dwarak Warrier | Dileep Subramaniam; Ganesh Gangadharan | Pritam Das; Ganesh Gangadharan | Manas Choudhary; Ganesh Gangadharan | Pritam Das; Ganesh Gangadharan | Dileep Subramaniam; Ganesh Gangadharan | Debashish Mishra; Ganesh Gangadharan |
| Line Producer(s) | Yogendra Mogre | Sudhanshu Kumar | Amit Tomar; Gurpreet Singh | Keshav Purushot | Navmeet Singh | Gurpreet Singh | TBA |
| Casting Director | Shanoo Sharma | Shanoo Sharma | Shanoo Sharma | Shanoo Sharma | Shanoo Sharma | Shanoo Sharma | Shanoo Sharma |

== Reception ==
=== Box office performance ===
The universe has been notable for its profit. Ek Tha Tiger and its follow-ups Tiger Zinda Hai and Tiger 3 earned a combined profit of ₹1,366.63 crore, according to International Business Times.

| Film | Release date | Production budget | Box office gross revenue | Ref |
|---|---|---|---|---|
| Ek Tha Tiger | 15 August 2012 | ₹75 crore (US$14.04 million) | ₹335 crore (US$62.69 million) | |
| Tiger Zinda Hai | 22 December 2017 | ₹130 crore (US$19.96 million) | ₹565 crore (US$86.76 million) | |
| War | 2 October 2019 | ₹170 crore (US$24.14 million) | ₹475.62 crore (US$67.54 million) | |
| Pathaan | 25 January 2023 | ₹250 crore (US$30.27 million) | ₹1,050.50 crore (US$127.18 million) | |
| Tiger 3 | 12 November 2023 | ₹280 crore (US$33.9 million) | ₹466.63 crore (US$56.49 million) | |
| War 2 | 14 August 2025 | ₹300 crore (equivalent to ₹310 crore or US$32 million in 2026) – ₹400 crore (equivalent to ₹413 crore or US$43 million in 2026) | ₹303 crore (equivalent to ₹313 crore or US$32 million in 2026) – ₹351 crore (equivalent to ₹362 crore or US$38 million in 2026) | |
| Alpha | 3 July 2026 | ₹100-130 crore | ₹97 crore | |
| Total | | ₹1,205 crore ($153 million) – ₹1,305 crore ($164 million) | ₹3,195.75 crore ($433 million) – ₹3,243.75 crore ($438 million) | |

=== Critical response ===
| Film | Rotten Tomatoes |
|---|---|
| Ek Tha Tiger | 75% (5.9/10 average rating) (16 reviews) |
| Tiger Zinda Hai | 64% (6.1/10 average rating) (14 reviews) |
| War | 71% (5.2/10 average rating) (17 reviews) |
| Pathaan | 85% (7.1/10 average rating) (33 reviews) |
| Tiger 3 | 55% (6/10 average rating) (22 reviews) |
| War 2 | 30% (5/10 average rating) (23 reviews) |
| Alpha | 22% (4.2/10 average rating) (18 reviews) |

==== Ek Tha Tiger (2012) ====
In India, there was praise for the film's feminist themes, with Marjolaine Gout noting the film is "a roaring, visual, comic feast where the damsel in distress fights back", giving Ek Tha Tiger 3.5 out of 5 stars. Anupama Chopra of the Hindustan Times also commended the feminist themes, saying "it's such a pleasure to see a Hindi film heroine not [be] a damsel in distress", while also praising the film's action sequences, giving Ek Tha Tiger 3 out of 5 stars.

Jahanavi Samant of Mid-Day gave the film the same rating and criticised its tone as being inconsistent, with "Ek Tha Tiger [being] unable to decide whether it is spy action or a love saga". Ronnie Scheib of Variety gave a positive review, praising the performances of the leads and film's production aesthetic, noting "Kaif impresses in her action-heroine debut, while Salman Khan's thinking-on-his-feet immediacy adds depth to his usual macho muscle. Local audiences will no doubt derive a special thrill from the onscreen reunion of stars Khan and Kaif, [with] Aseem Mishra's gorgeous location lensing".

==== Tiger Zinda Hai (2017) ====
Tiger Zinda Hai opened to mostly positive reviews. Taran Adarsh of Bollywood Hungama gave 4.5 stars, and said "Salman is the lifeline, the real treasure of Tiger Zinda Hai. He sinks his teeth into the character and, in several sequences, peels off the mask of super-stardom and brings the actor to the fore. Katrina is in solid form, in action sequences specifically commands attention."

Lasyapriya Sundaram of The Times of India gave 3.5 stars, and said "The film is visually stunning in parts and Salman Khan plays Tiger with roaring confidence and dialogues packed with punch. Of course, his fans get a true-blue Salman Khan moment when he bares his torso." Rachit Gupta of Filmfare gave 3.5 stars, and said "It may look like a Hollywood action thriller, but at its heart, Tiger Zinda Hai is an unabashed masala movie. The heady mixture of an international-looking action film and the regular tropes of Hindi cinema make it a pleasing watch."

==== War (2019) ====
Anupama Chopra said,"War is a popcorn entertainer and you can't ask too many questions but if you're willing to suspend disbelief, the twists and turns exert a solid grip." A writer for Bollywood Hungama gave the film 4 stars, and said "War is an action entertainer which has style as well as enough twists and turns to keep the viewers engrossed. At the box office, the extended weekend, dazzling action, stunning international locales and stylish execution will ensure mammoth footfalls for the film". Taran Adarsh gave it four stars out of five and called the film "[e]scapist cinema at its best".

Komal Nahta of Film Information opined, "The film could prove to be the starting of a new franchise for the Yash Raj Films banner". Writing for India TV, Sonal gave the film 3.5 stars, writing, "Hrithik Roshan, Tiger Shroff of Abbas-Mustan kinda twists, turns, characters, situations, logic, gravity, physics, chemistry, and some Ekta Kapoor-esque tricks all tossed together to make a visually spectacular concoction".The Times of India rated it three stars out of five and felt the film had "lot of style, stunts and show, but lacking a solid storyline".

==== Pathaan (2023) ====
Taran Adarsh of Bollywood Hungama rated the film 4.5 out of 5 stars and termed the film "complete entertainer replete with action, emotions, patriotism, humour, thrill, and of course, the star power of Shah Rukh Khan." Sukanya Verma of Rediff gave the film a rating of 4 out of 5 stars and wrote "Shah Rukh Khan's weathered intensity, grizzly charisma and trademark wit lends Pathaan's all-out, devil-may-care antics a sense of purpose that evades mindless acts of mayhem". Devesh Sharma of Filmfare rated the film 4 out of 5 stars and stated that the film is a "visual spectacle" and termed action choreography is "truly out of this world". Saibal Chatterjee of NDTV rated the film 3.5 out of 5 and said that the film swings and strikes with all the "style" and "aplomb" in the world.

Renuka Vyavahare of The Times of India rated the film 3.5 out of 5 stars and wrote "Pathaan has all the ingredients of a masala potboiler — slowmo entries, iconic battle of good versus bad and most importantly a sexy-smouldering Shah Rukh Khan, who can fight the good fight on and off the screen".

==== Tiger 3 (2023) ====
Taran Adarsh of Bollywood Hungama gave the film 4/5 stars and wrote "Tiger 3 is the biggest dhamaka you can expect this Diwali" praised the second half and performances of Khan, Kaif and Hashmi and appreciated the cameo of Shahrukh Khan.

Ronak Kotecha of The Times of India gave the film 3/5 stars and wrote "Tiger 3 qualifies as a good addition to the franchise with enough ammo for mass entertainment." Zinia Bandyopadhyay of India Today gave 3/5 stars and wrote "Despite an overcrowded spy universe, Tiger 3 manages to hold his own ground. Khan fans won’t be disappointed, but someone give Kaif a Zoya series pronto!"

==== War 2 (2025) ====
Dhaval Roy of The Times Of India gave the film 3 out of 5 stars, calling it "strictly watchable, only for the action and spectacle". Kusumika Das from Times Now gave the film 3 out of 5 stars. She praised the performances, action sequences, and dialogues but noted that the film struggled in the second half due to a slower pace. Vinamra Mathur of Firstpost gave the film 2.5 out of 5 stars and noted that the film had endless conversations and combats that barely served any purpose.

Rishabh Suri of Hindustan Times gave the film 2 out of 5 stars, criticising the screenplay and soundtrack, but praising the action sequences. Radhika Sharma of NDTV gave 2 out of 5 stars and wrote "The sequel takes the viewers on a journey to at least 10 countries, stuffing episodes from at least six of them in the post credis". Mayur Sanap of Rediff.com gave 3.5 out of 5 stars, writing "War 2 offers you exactly what you’d expect from a mass entertainer: some escapist fun, truly knockout action scenes, and overall, a good time at the movies".

== Other media ==
=== Graphic novels ===
- A graphic novel titled Ek Tha Tiger: Mahasagar Ki Suraksha (English: Ek Tha Tiger: Saving The High Seas) was published in 2012 by Yomics. Post-release, the comic failed to generate positive word-of-mouth. Joginder Tuteja of Bollywood Hungama commended the comics' design but said that the main story failed to meet his expectations of a deeper plot, exciting narrative, and a tighter script.
- Another graphic novel named Ek Tha Tiger: Caught In The Web has been published in 2012 by Yomics, which also features some Hum Tum characters.

=== Games ===
- Ek tha Tiger and Tiger the Bhai, two action mobile video games developed by Zapak, were released as tie-ins for the 2012 film.
- Being SalMan: The Official Game, a 3D action mobile video game developed by Playizzon, was released in 2016. It featured characters portrayed by Khan, including Tiger, Chulbul Pandey from the Dabangg franchise, and Prem Dilwale from Prem Ratan Dhan Payo (2015).

== See also ==
- Dhoom (film series)
- Race (film series)
- Cop Universe
