= YRF =

YRF may refer to:

- Yash Raj Films, an Indian film production company
  - YRF (YouTube channel)
  - YRF Television, a defunct Indian TV production company
  - YRF Spy Universe, a fictional universe and related Indian media franchise
- Cartwright Airport, IATA airport code
