= Tiger (YRF Spy Universe) =

- YRF Spy Universe character
- First appearance: Ek Tha Tiger (2012)
- First game: Ek Tha Tiger
- Created by: Aditya Chopra; Kabir Khan; Neelesh Misra
- Portrayed by: Salman Khan

In-universe information
- Full name: Avinash Singh Rathore
- Alias: Manish Chandra
- Nickname: Tiger
- Gender: Male
- Occupation: R&AW agent
- Affiliation: Research and Analysis Wing (R&AW)
- Significant other: Zoya
- Children: Hassan (adopted son, deceased); Junior (son)
- Nationality: Indian

Avinash Singh Rathore, better known by his codename Tiger, is a fictional Research and Analysis Wing (R&AW) agent appearing in the Tiger film series and other films of the YRF Spy Universe, an Indian cinematic universe. He is portrayed by Salman Khan. The character first appeared in Ek Tha Tiger (2012) and appeared in its sequels Tiger Zinda Hai (2017) and Tiger 3 (2023). Tiger also made a brief appearance in Pathaan (2023), another film in the universe.

== Overview ==
Tiger was born on 29 December 1968 in Chambal, Madhya Pradesh, India.

In Ek Tha Tiger, Tiger disassociates himself with R&AW after eloping with Zoya Nazar, a Pakistani ISI agent. However, he remains loyal to India and occasionally goes on missions to save his country from threats. Tiger is married to Zoya and has two sons: an adopted-son Hassan, a suicide bomber whom he adopted during a mission in Iraq and his biological son, Junior. He is one of the three main agents in the universe, along with Pathaan (portrayed by Shah Rukh Khan) and Kabir (portrayed by Hrithik Roshan).

== Development ==
The family of Ravindra Kaushik, an Indian R&AW agent nicknamed "Black Tiger", claimed that the story of the film Ek Tha Tiger was based on his life and asked for credits in the film titles. In July 2012, a legal notice was served by the nephew of Kaushik, stating the film bears a striking resemblance to his uncle and his uncle's life. Though director Kabir Khan denied these claims.

== Other media ==
=== Comics ===
- A graphic novel titled Ek Tha Tiger: Mahasagar Ki Suraksha (English: Ek Tha Tiger: Saving The High Seas) was published in 2012 by Yomics. Post-release, the comic failed to generate positive word-of-mouth. Joginder Tuteja of Bollywood Hungama commended the comics' design but said that the main story failed to meet his expectations of a deeper plot, exciting narrative, and a tighter script.
- Another graphic novel named Ek Tha Tiger: Caught In The Web has been published in 2012 by Yomics, which also features some Hum Tum characters.

=== Video games ===
- Ek tha Tiger and Tiger the Bhai, two action mobile video games developed by Zapak, were released as tie-ins for the 2012 film.
- Being SalMan: The Official Game, a 3D action mobile video game developed by Playizzon, was released in 2016. It featured characters portrayed by Khan, including Tiger, Chulbul Pandey from the Dabangg franchise, and Prem Dilwale from Prem Ratan Dhan Payo (2015).
