= Alpha (2026 film) =

2026 Indian film by Shiv Rawail

- Theatrical release poster
- Directed by: Shiv Rawail
- Screenplay by: Soumil Shukla; Shridhar Raghavan
- Dialogues by: Ishita Moitra
- Story by: Uday Chopra
- Produced by: Aditya Chopra
- Starring: Alia Bhatt; Sharvari; Anil Kapoor; Bobby Deol
- Cinematography: Rubais
- Edited by: Aarif Sheikh
- Music by: Songs: Rohansh and Abeer Pandit; Score: Sanchit and Ankit Balhara
- Production company: Yash Raj Films
- Distributed by: Yash Raj Films
- Release date: 3 July 2026
- Running time: 140 minutes
- Country: India
- Language: Hindi
- Budget: ₹100−150 crore (Note: Times Now reported the budget as reportedly ₹100 crore. Esquire India published that multiple reports estimate the budget ranging between ₹100–125 crore. News18 reported ₹100–130 crore. Navbharat Times reported ₹150 crore.)
- Box office: ₹98.62 crore

Alpha is a 2026 Indian Hindi-language action thriller film directed by Shiv Rawail, in his feature film debut, and produced by Aditya Chopra under Yash Raj Films. Written by Soumil Shukla, Shridhar Raghavan and Ishita Moitra from a story by Chopra's brother Uday, it is the seventh installment in the YRF Spy Universe and the first female-led film in the universe. Set after the events of War 2 (2025), it stars Alia Bhatt, Sharvari, Anil Kapoor and Bobby Deol in the lead roles with Hrithik Roshan in an extended cameo appearance. The film follows a highly trained assassin raised in isolation as a super-soldier by a rogue commander. When she discovers the dark truth about her family and her stolen childhood, she teams up with her long lost sister to take down her creator and his illicit military program.

Following a title announcement in July 2024, principal photography began in the same month, taking place in Mumbai, Jammu and Kashmir, and Valladolid. Alpha was released theatrically on 3 July 2026. It received mixed-to-negative reviews from critics and underperformed at the box office.

== Plot ==
Following the 1999 Kargil War, Colonel Fateh Singh Lakhawat, with the assistance of Lieutenant Colonel Vikrant Kaul, initiates a covert Indian Army super-soldier project known as Alpha. Three years later, after successful trials, the program receives official approval. Meanwhile, Vikrant's pregnant wife, Janaki, is diagnosed with congenital heart disease. Hoping to save her and her unborn child's lives, Vikrant secretly steals a vial of the experimental Alpha serum, which possesses regenerative properties, and administers it to her. Although her condition improves during the later stages of pregnancy, the serum's long-term effects prove fatal. Janaki dies shortly after giving birth to twin daughters. As a consequence of Vikrant's actions, and the death of some soldiers after the trials due to brain hemorrhage, the Alpha program is ordered to be discontinued, Vikrant retires from the army, and Fateh is demoted to Lieutenant Colonel and reassigned to Cherrapunji.

Determined to continue the project, Fateh, aided by Dr. John Verghese, abducts one of the newborn twins, who has inherited the serum in her bloodstream, while deceiving Vikrant into believing that both his wife and daughter died. Naming the child Sita in memory of Janaki, Fateh raises her at a secret facility in Rajasthan as the primary subject of a revived Alpha program. The second twin, Durga, is raised separately and grows up unaware of her sister's existence.

Twenty-four years later, in 2026, Sita systematically assassinates the scientists and military officials associated with the Alpha program before destroying Fateh's research facility. Her actions attract the attention of the Research & Analysis Wing (R&AW), led by Vikrant, who has succeeded his late friend Sunil Luthra as the agency's chief. (Note: As shown in War 2 (2025)) After confronting Fateh, Vikrant learns that Sita is his biological daughter. He subsequently travels to Valladolid to meet Durga, who has been living an ordinary life.

Sita tracks Vikrant to his safe house in Srinagar, where she briefly fights Durga before subduing the pair and revealing that she has learned the truth about Project Alpha from Verghese. Before they can reconcile, Fateh's forces attack the safe house. Sita and Durga escape to another safe house in Ladakh, while Vikrant remains behind to delay the attackers and pursue Fateh. Although Vikrant locates him, he is captured.

Fateh's forces later assault the Ladakh safe house but are repelled with the assistance of Kabir Dhaliwal. During the battle, Durga is wounded, allowing Sita to escape with her while Kabir covers their retreat. Sita later infiltrates Fateh's compound in Srinagar alone and discovers Vikrant with an explosive device strapped to his body. Fateh reveals that his true identity is Major Zarrar Khan, an undercover operative of the Inter-Services Intelligence (ISI) who infiltrated the Indian Army in 1989 with the objective of developing the Alpha serum and delivering it to Pakistan. Zarrar subsequently departs for his base in Cherrapunji after abducting Durga to harvest her brain cells in the development of an improved version of the serum.

After escaping, Sita and Vikrant track Zarrar to his Cherrapunji facility. Durga frees herself and joins Vikrant and the soldiers stationed at the base in resisting Zarrar's forces. During the ensuing confrontation, Sita defeats Zarrar and pins him on a wall. Learning that there will be complications keeping him alive, Kaul asks Sita to kill him by shooting him in the head. With the Alpha program dismantled and Zarrar killed, Vikrant is reunited with both of his daughters. He offers Sita and Durga the choice of leading ordinary lives or joining R&AW to use their abilities in service of India.

== Cast ==
- Alia Bhatt as Sita Kaul
  - Khushi Hajare as teenage Sita
    - Kiara Khanna as child Sita
- Sharvari as Durga Kaul, Sita's biological fraternal twin sister
- Anil Kapoor as Lieutenant Colonel Vikrant Kaul, Chief of R&AW, former Indian Army soldier, Sita and Durga's biological father
- Bobby Deol as Former Indian Army Colonel Fateh Singh Lakhawat (impostor) / Pakistan Army Major Zarrar Khan (real), Sita's former adoptive father
- Dibyendu Bhattacharya as Dr. John Varghese
- Vishal Katpal as Madhur Kulkarni
- Shubhi Mehta as Susan Cherian
- Digvijay Sawant as Subrato Das
- Bhushan Simpi as Amit Thakur
- Pavleen Gujral as Dr. Preeti Mann
- Pranay Narayan as General Sodhi
- Rajiv Ranjan as General Mankani
- Karan Kishore as Karan
- Sangay Tsheltrim as Captain Bhupen Rawat
- Vibha Saraf as Aruna
- Shivam Pal as Wazeer
- Mayank Anand as Mr. X
- Abhimanyu Sarkar as Dharam
- Gaurav Bisht as Veer
- Abhijeet Tayung as Subedar Bhakta
- Santosh Hirasinghani as Fateh's aide
- Charudutt Sapra as Fateh's mercenary
- Matt McHugh as Dr. Solokov
- Debanjan Chatterjee as Dr. Atharv Raje

Cameo appearances

- Hrithik Roshan as Major Kabir Dhaliwal
- Dia Mirza as Janaki Kaul, Vikrant's late wife
- Ashutosh Rana as Colonel Sunil Luthra (archival footage from War 2)

== Production ==
=== Development ===
Yash Raj Films announced the title on 5 July 2024, describing Alpha as the first female-led film in their YRF Spy Universe. Shiv Rawail, known for the Netflix series The Railway Men, was recruited by producer Aditya Chopra to direct the film. It was Rawail's first feature film, and story writer Uday Chopra's first Hindi film credit since Dhoom 3 (2013). A release date of Christmas 2025 was announced in October 2024.

=== Casting ===
Alia Bhatt and Sharvari were attached to the project by August 2023. In March 2024, Bobby Deol was reported to be the antagonist. Anil Kapoor joined the cast in July 2024, reprising his role from War 2. Hrithik Roshan was confirmed to make a cameo appearance in August 2024, reprising his role as Kabir Dhaliwal. Dibyendu Bhattacharya joined the cast in March 2025. Dia Mirza made a guest appearance.

=== Filming ===
Principal photography began on 5 July 2024, with filming taking place in Mumbai and Jammu and Kashmir. The Kashmir schedule, filmed in Sonamarg and Pahalgam, concluded in September 2024 after delays due to adverse weather. Sharvari said that filming was "supremely fun but physically so taxing". Hrithik Roshan joined the production in November 2024 for his cameo shoot in Mumbai. In August 2025, Alia Bhatt and Sharvari wrapped shooting. Filming was completed in November 2025. Action trainer and stunt expert Jessen Noviello prepared Alia Bhatt and Sharvari for their action sequences.

== Music ==
Alpha

Soundtrack album by Rohansh Pandit, Abeer Pandit, Sanchit Balhara and Ankit Balhara
- Released: 3 July 2026
- Recorded: 2025–2026
- Studios: YRF Studios, Mumbai
- Genre: Feature film soundtrack
- Length: 32:12
- Language: Hindi
- Label: YRF Music
- Producers: Rohansh Pandit; Abeer Pandit; Aaishvary Thackeray; Saurabh Lokhande; Karan Kanchan; Vaibhav Pani
External audio
- Official Audio Jukebox on YouTube

The soundtrack for Alpha was composed by debutantes Rohansh Pandit and Abeer Pandit, sons of noted film composer Lalit Pandit. The film score was composed by Sanchit Balhara and Ankit Balhara.

The track "Jamaican (Bam Bam)" by Hugel and SOLTO was used in the film trailer.

Track listing
| No. | Title | Lyrics | Music | Singer(s) | Length |
|---|---|---|---|---|---|
| 1. | "Massacre" | Kausar Munir, Rohansh Pandit, Abeer Pandit | Rohansh Pandit and Abeer Pandit | Shilpa Rao, Jonita Gandhi, Rohansh Pandit, Abeer Pandit | 3:24 |
| 2. | "Champagne" | Anvita Dutt | Rohansh Pandit and Abeer Pandit | Akasa Singh, Rohansh Pandit, Abeer Pandit | 2:40 |
| 3. | "Haaniya" | Kumaar, Rohansh Pandit, Abeer Pandit | Rohansh Pandit and Abeer Pandit | Vishal Dadlani, Rohansh Pandit, Abeer Pandit | 3:15 |
| 4. | "Agni" | Ranj, Rohansh Pandit, Abeer Pandit | Rohansh Pandit and Abeer Pandit | Rohansh Pandit, Abeer Pandit | 3:03 |
| 5. | "Vaar Vaar" | Sahib Samra | Rohansh Pandit and Abeer Pandit | Sahib Samra, Ruaa Kayy | 2:43 |
| 6. | "Shadows" | Rohansh Pandit, Abeer Pandit | Rohansh Pandit and Abeer Pandit | Rohansh Pandit, Abeer Pandit, Richard Mithra, Tanushree Bhatia | 3:01 |
| 7. | "Massacre" (Midnight Version) | Rohansh Pandit, Abeer Pandit, Aaishvary Thackeray | Rohansh Pandit and Abeer Pandit | Rohansh Pandit, Abeer Pandit | 2:25 |
| 8. | "Fateh’s Theme" | Instrumental | Ankit Balhara and Sanchit Balhara | Instrumental | 3:31 |
| 9. | "Alpha x Hip-Hop Theme" | Ankit Balhara | Ankit Balhara and Sanchit Balhara | Instrumental | 1:05 |
| 10. | "I’m Gonna Eat You Alive (OST)" | Ankit Balhara | Ankit Balhara and Sanchit Balhara | Katya Krishnan, Ankit Balhara, Sanchit Balhara. | 1:49 |
| 11. | "Alpha vs Alpha Theme" | Ankit Balhara | Ankit Balhara and Sanchit Balhara | Ankit Balhara, Sanchit Balhara | 1:19 |
| 12. | "Rola Paen De - Kaul in Action (OST)" | Ankit Balhara | Ankit Balhara and Sanchit Balhara | Ankit Balhara | 1:41 |
| 13. | "Kabir x Alpha Theme" | Ankit Balhara | Ankit Balhara and Sanchit Balhara | Ankit Balhara, Sanchit Balhara, Katya Krishnan | 2:16 |
| Total length: | | | | | 32:12 |

== Marketing ==
Alia Bhatt and Sharvari teamed up to cheer for the Indian women's cricket team for the 2026 Women's T20 World Cup. They made an Instagram video about the team with the caption "From 2 Alphas to Team India's 15 Alphas!" The film's teaser was released on 10 June 2026. The official trailer was released on 17 June 2026. The film was also promoted on the comedy reality show India's Got Latent, where Bhatt and Sharvari appeared as guest judges on the panel.

== Release ==
=== Theatrical ===
Alpha was theatrically released on 3 July 2026. It was initially slated to release on 25 December 2025, coinciding with Christmas and Tulsi Pujan Diwas. It was later postponed to 17 April 2026, due to post-production work on visual effects. The release date again got deferred to its current release date.

=== Certification ===
The film received a U/A 16+ certificate on 29 June 2026 by the Central Board of Film Certification (CBFC) after certain cuts, profanity muting and visual changes. The CBFC's Examining Committee asked the makers to reduce visuals of multiple stabbings in the second half and replace them with alternative visuals. A foul word was also asked to be deleted in the first half by the Committee. The runtime of the film is 140.48 minutes.

=== Home media ===
The film began streaming on Netflix from 28 August, coinciding with Raksha Bandhan, premiered on Sony Max on 31 October, coinciding with Halloween and 8 November 2026, coinciding with Diwali.

== Reception ==
=== Box office ===
On its opening day, the film earned ₹9.12 crore at the domestic box office.

Alpha grossed ₹98.62 crore (US$11 million) worldwide. It grossed ₹68.72 crore (US$7.3 million) in India and ₹29.9 crore (US$3.2 million) in overseas market.

=== Critical response ===
Alpha received mixed-to-negative reviews from critics and audiences. On the review aggregator website Rotten Tomatoes, 26% of 19 critics' reviews are positive, with an average rating of 4.5/10.

Reviewers identified the film as either a spy thriller, a spy actioner, an action thriller or a family melodrama.

Vineeta Kumar considered the film better-directed than War 2, despite it being Rawail's feature debut. In contrast, Bollywood Hungama believed the direction to be lacklustre and "not up to the mark." Kumar described the screenplay as focusing more on building shock value over intrigue, and Bollywood Hungama deemed it derivative and illogical. Though, Nandini Ramnath made note of the screenplay containing twists that "enliven the parade of dull writing and repetitive action set pieces." Shubhra Gupta pointed out how characters don't speak in lines, rather "they lurch from one dialogue to another," and Rahul Desai termed the dialogues mechanical. Conversely, Bollywood Hungama had some praise for the dialogues. Some, like Titas Chowdhury, found the story to be "largely predictable". Others, like Bollywood Hungama, believed the story to show promise in the beginning, only to get weak "later on." The characters were "sketchily drawn" for Ramnath. Though, Bollywood Hungama found Durga to be a "far more likable" character than Sita.

While some reviewers, like Kumar, offered praise towards Bhatt for carrying the physicality of the role remarkably well, others, like Chowdhury, had praise for her restrained display of emotions even during moments of heroism. Still others, like Ramnath, were more critical, questioning how much acting can one expect between "high-kicking and weapon-discharging." Some publications, like Bollywood Hungama, found Sharvari's screen presence arresting, who looked "great in action scenes." Others, like Rishabh Suri, were more reserved, believing her performance to be merely obligatory. Kumar went so far as to accuse the film of reducing her into a "sexualised doll who occasionally gets to perform." Some reviewers, like Chowdhury, believed Kapoor to balance both dimensions, his resoluteness as the RAW chief and his helplessness as a father, with ease. Although, for Kumar, he was only there for espousing dialogues. Though, Deol "slips effortlessly under the skin of an antagonist and delivers" for Chowdhury, she also had criticism for his inconsistent Haryanvi accent. Similarly, Kumar believed that his stylish performance was held back by the writing which "doesn't give him enough substance." Mirza received praise from Gupta, Bollywood Hungama and Suri, managing to "leave a mark" for the former. Bhattacharya "lends able support," per Bollywood Hungama. Though, Kumar found Mirza and Bhattacharya to make the film "more melodramatic than it is supposed to be." Roshan was praised by Suri, finding him engaging despite his brief appearance. Though, Kumar questioned the necessity of his appearance.

Action sequences were entertaining for Bollywood Hungama. Though, Gupta and Kumar were more reserved, the former only praising the action between the two leads. Conversely, Chowdhury and Suri found those underwhelming, the former lamenting the lack of originality in them. While "Vaar Vaar" stood out for Bollywood Hungama, the rest of the songs failed to impress them. Additionally, they found "Massacre" to be visually striking, but out of place. The background score was praised by Chowdhury and Suri, the latter commending its effort "to make the action seem cool." The cinematography was praised by Chowdhury and Bollywood Hungama, the latter finding it spectacular. In contrast, Ramnath described the "drab" backdrops as having "shades of muddy grey, green and brown." The production design, "top-class" for Bollywood Hungama, was criticised by Gupta as "usual dank offices" for interior locations and "scenic but familiar" for the outdoor ones. Though she did like the inclusion of Cherrapunji. The costumes were glamorous, the visual effects were first-rate, and the editing was fine for Bollywood Hungama. Conversely, Desai termed the technicalities cosmetic.

=== Themes ===
Sita placing a flower in her hair and looking at herself in the waters was seen by Chowdhury as perhaps Sita "discovering femininity, gentleness and softness for the very first time."

Regarding Sita—who was "locked away, trained and brainwashed for years—to promptly go nation-first in the climax," Desai said, "it's almost as if she has to prove her allegiances a little harder than her male counterparts."
