= Tera Mera Vaada =

- Theatrical release poster
- Directed by: Bhaal Singh Balhara
- Produced by: Ravinder Singh JD; Jashandeep Singh JD
- Starring: Ankit Balhara; Neetu Naval Singh
- Edited by: Mahfooz Khan
- Music by: Sanchit Balhara
- Distributed by: JD Films Entertainment Pvt Ltd.
- Release date: 29 June 2012
- Country: India
- Language: Haryanvi

Tera Mera Vaada is a 2012 Haryanvi language film from India that was directed by Bhaal Singh Balhara and produced by Ravinder Singh JD.

Tera Mera Vaada stars Ankit Balhara and Neetu Naval Singh. The movie trailer was released on 8 June 2012 and the film was released on 29 June 2012. The film was shot within 45 days.

== Plot ==
Tera Mera Vaada starts with freshmen students living their new college life. Abhimanyu Dahiya(Ankit Balhara) comes from a village of Haryana to study in the city. He is the only child of his village head. Meenal(Neetu Singh)is a modern girl whose father(Shamsher Singh) is a high-ranking police officer in Haryana. They start dating but are continuously nagged by Vicky, who is their college mate. In one instance, Vicky tries to molest Neetu, when Abhimanyu rescues her bravely. From that point onwards, Abhimanyu and Vicky become enemies. The movie goes on around their college life till interval.

Abhimanyu studies hard and gets selected for a good post in Haryana Police. Working under Meenal's father, he tries to eliminate crime from the streets of Haryana. Then comes Lucky Raam(Vicky's father), who is a local goon and produces fake ghee(edible oil) and poisonous liquor. Abhimanyu, as a true police officer, starts to destroy the son-father duo's illegal business. He then arrests Vicky with his consignment of fake ghee but was released on bail later. Somehow, Vicky manages some video clip of Meenal having indecent content. He threatens Shamsher Singh to stop Abhimanyu from catching their supply else this video will surface on the Internet. Shamsher Singh tells Meenal not to see Abhimanyu anymore. Startled by her strange behaviour, Abhimanyu couldn't understand what's going on with her. Vicky's business starts to flourish again. 37 people die due to consumption of liquor supplied by Vicky. When they lost the video clip, they kidnap Meenal and threaten Shamsher Singh to kill her, if he doesn't stop Abhimanyu from arresting them. Later on, Abhimanyu rescues her and they get married.

Haryanvi culture is introduced in the movie with the modern-ship of youngsters. It is the first Haryanvi movie in which music is given by foreign artists.

== Soundtrack ==
The music for Tera Mera Vaada was composed by Sanchit Balhara and foreign artists of England. The tracklist has seven tracks and features singers Ankit Balhara and Antara Mitra. The soundtrack received positive reviews.
