= Ayan Mukerji =

Indian filmmaker (born 1983)

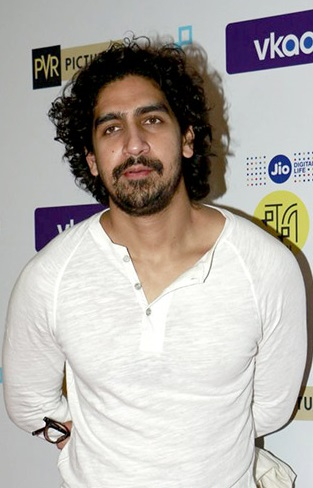
- Mukerji in 2017
- Born: Ayan Deb Mukerji; 15 August 1983 (age 43); Calcutta, West Bengal, India
- Other name: Ayan Mukherjee
- Occupations: Director; screenwriter; producer
- Years active: 2004–present
- Parent: Deb Mukherjee
- Family: Mukherjee-Samarth family

Ayan Deb Mukerji (born 15 August 1983) is an Indian filmmaker who works in Hindi films. A member of the Mukherjee-Samarth family, he is known for his collaborations with actor Ranbir Kapoor under Karan Johar's production banner Dharma Productions.

Mukerji made his directorial debut with the coming-of-age film Wake Up Sid (2009), which opened to strong reviews and box office returns. His next two directorials, the romantic comedy-drama Yeh Jawaani Hai Deewani (2013) and the fantasy action-adventure film Brahmāstra: Part One – Shiva (2022), rank among the highest-grossing Hindi films. All three films earned him nominations for the Filmfare Award for Best Director, with Wake Up Sid also winning him the Filmfare Award for Best Debut Director.

== Early life and background ==
Ayan Deb Mukerji was born on 15 August 1983 in Calcutta, West Bengal, the son of Bengali film actor Deb Mukherjee. His family was involved in the Indian film industry since 1930, when his grandfather Sashadhar Mukherjee first ventured into the field. Sashadhar Mukherjee was one of the founding partners of Filmistan Studio in Mumbai and a pioneer in the industry, producing films like Dil Deke Dekho (1959), Love in Simla (1960), Ek Musafir Ek Hasina (1962) and Leader (1964). Filmistan Studio is still run by Ayan's extended family.

Ayan's grandmother, Satidevi Mukherjee (née Ganguly), wife of Sashadhar Mukherji, was the sister of pioneer actors Ashok Kumar, Anup Kumar, and actor-singer Kishore Kumar. Ayan's grandfather's brothers were film producer Prabodh Mukherjee, director Subodh Mukherjee and Ravindra Mohan Mukherjee, the grandfather of actress Rani Mukherjee. Ayan's paternal uncles were actors Joy Mukherjee, Subir Mukherjee and Shomu Mukherjee, who is the husband of actress Tanuja and the father of actresses Kajol and Tanisha Mukherjee.

Mukerji studied at Jamnabai Narsee School in Vile Parle, Mumbai. He later attended Rajiv Gandhi Institute of Technology but dropped out after the first year to assist Ashutosh Gowariker as a clapper boy on Swades (2004).

== Career ==
=== Initial work and directorial debut (2004–2009) ===
Mukerji started his career as an assistant director to his brother-in-law Ashutosh Gowariker on the social drama Swades (2004), and later to Karan Johar on the ensemble musical romantic drama Kabhi Alvida Naa Kehna (2006), also appearing as an extra in the latter.

After taking a short break from filmmaking, Mukerji wrote the screenplay for the 2009 coming-of-age comedy-drama Wake Up Sid and then directed it. Starring Ranbir Kapoor and Konkona Sen Sharma in lead roles, it marked the first of several collaborations between Mukerji and Kapoor. The film tells the story of a careless rich college brat (Kapoor) who is taught the value of owning up to responsibility by an aspiring writer from Kolkata (Sen Sharma). Produced by Johar's banner Dharma Productions, it opened to widespread critical acclaim for its novel concept, themes, direction, story, screenplay, soundtrack and the performances of the cast. It emerged as a commercial success at the box office, grossing ₹62 crore (US$6.6 million) worldwide. Wake Up Sid earned Mukerji the inaugural Filmfare Award for Best Debut Director (tying for the award with Zoya Akhtar for Luck by Chance), in addition to his first nomination for the Filmfare Award for Best Director.

=== Breakthrough and further success (2013–present) ===
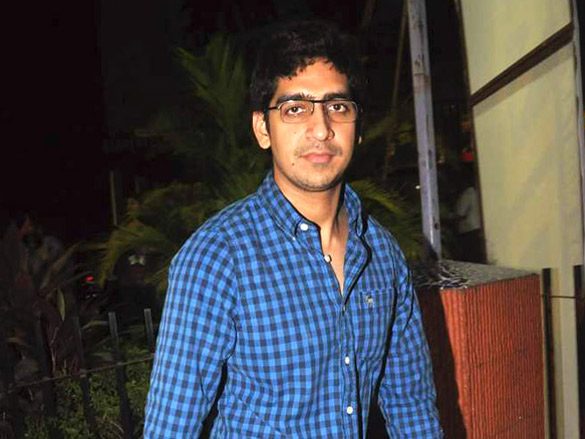
Mukherji in 2012

Mukerji achieved his breakthrough with the romantic comedy-drama Yeh Jawaani Hai Deewani (2013), starring Kapoor and Deepika Padukone in lead roles, alongside Kalki Koechlin and Aditya Roy Kapur. The film was his second under Johar's banner. It revolves around two people who meet during a trekking trip where one falls in love with the other but refrains from expressing it. They soon drift apart but end up meeting again at a friend's wedding. Yeh Jawaani Hai Deewani opened to widespread critical acclaim, with high praise for its direction, story, screenplay, soundtrack, cinematography, production design, costumes and the performances of its cast. The film emerged as a major blockbuster at the box office, grossing ₹319.6 crore (US$34 million) worldwide, and ranking as the fourth highest-grossing Hindi film of the year. Yeh Jawaani Hai Deewani earned Mukerji his second nomination for the Filmfare Award for Best Director. Over the years, it has emerged as a highly popular film amongst youth.

Mukerji wrote and directed the big-budget fantasy film Brahmāstra: Part One – Shiva (2022) starring Kapoor, Amitabh Bachchan, Alia Bhatt, Mouni Roy and Nagarjuna in lead roles. Produced by Johar's banner, it is the first installment of a trilogy, planned to be part of a cinematic universe titled Āstraverse. The film was first conceived by Mukerji in 2011, with core elements inspired by Indian history and stories he heard in his childhood. Unlike Mukerji's two previous ventures, it opened to mixed reviews from critics upon release, with praise for the performances, direction, visual effects, soundtrack, musical score and action sequences, but criticism for its dialogue. However, the film emerged as Mukerji's second consecutive major blockbuster at the box-office, grossing ₹431 crore (US$46 million) worldwide. It ranked as the highest-grossing Hindi film of the year, the fifth highest-grossing Indian film of the year, the highest-grossing Hindi film in overseas markets since the COVID-19 pandemic, and one of the highest-grossing Indian films of all time. Brahmāstra: Part One – Shiva earned Mukerji his third nomination for the Filmfare Award for Best Director.

Mukerji's fourth directorial was the sixth installment in the YRF Spy Universe and a circumquel to 2019 film War titled War 2 (2025) starring Hrithik Roshan, N. T. Rama Rao Jr. and Kiara Advani. The film marked his first venture to neither be produced by Dharma Productions nor feature Kapoor. It received mixed-to-negative reviews from critics and underperformed at the box-office, but nonetheless emerged as the year's third highest-grossing film.

As of August 2025, A circumquel titled Brahmа̄stra: Part Two – Dev and a sequel titled Brahmāstra: Part Three – Shiva vs Dev are in development. Mukerji is set to direct both circumquel and sequel respectively.

== Filmography ==
Year	Title	Director	Writer	Producer	Notes
2009	Wake Up Sid	Yes	Yes	No	Dialogues by Niranjan Iyengar
2013	Yeh Jawaani Hai Deewani	Yes	Yes	No	Dialogues by Hussain Dalal
2022	Brahmāstra: Part One – Shiva	Yes	Yes	Yes	Dialogues by Hussain Dalal
2025	War 2	Yes	No	No	Story by Aditya Chopra, Screenplay by Shridhar Raghavan and Dialogues by Abbas Tyrewala

Other roles

Year	Title	Role
2004	Swades	Assistant director
2006	Kabhi Alvida Naa Kehna	Assistant director
2023	Tiger 3	Director of post-credits scene

Acting roles

Year	Title	Role	Notes
2005	Home Delivery	Karan’s colleague	Cameo appearances
2006	Kabhi Alvida Naa Kehna	Extra in the song "Tumhi Dekho Naa"	Cameo appearances
2013	Yeh Jawaani Hai Deewani	DJ in party	Cameo appearances

== Awards and nominations ==
Film	Award	Category	Result	Ref
Wake Up Sid	55th Filmfare Awards	Best Director	Nominated	
Wake Up Sid	55th Filmfare Awards	Best Debut Director	Won	
Wake Up Sid	Screen Awards	Best Debut Director	Nominated	
Wake Up Sid	Stardust Awards	Hottest New Director	Won	
Wake Up Sid	Producers Guild Film Awards	Best Debut Director	Won	
Wake Up Sid	Producers Guild Film Awards	Best Director	Nominated	
Wake Up Sid	Producers Guild Film Awards	Best Story	Nominated	
Wake Up Sid	11th IIFA Awards	Best Director	Nominated	
Wake Up Sid	11th IIFA Awards	Best Story	Nominated	
Yeh Jawaani Hai Deewani	BIG Star Entertainment Awards	Most Entertaining Director	Nominated	
Yeh Jawaani Hai Deewani	59th Filmfare Awards	Best Director	Nominated	
Yeh Jawaani Hai Deewani	Screen Awards	Best Director	Nominated	
Yeh Jawaani Hai Deewani	15th IIFA Awards	Best Director	Nominated	
Yeh Jawaani Hai Deewani	Producers Guild Film Awards	Best Director	Nominated	
Yeh Jawaani Hai Deewani	Producers Guild Film Awards	Best Screenplay	Nominated	
Yeh Jawaani Hai Deewani	Zee Cine Awards	Best Screenplay	Won	
Yeh Jawaani Hai Deewani	Zee Cine Awards	Best Director	Won	
Yeh Jawaani Hai Deewani	Zee Cine Awards	Best Story	Nominated	
Yeh Jawaani Hai Deewani	Zee Cine Awards	Best Dialogue	Nominated	
Yeh Jawaani Hai Deewani	ETC Bollywood Business Awards	Bollywood Business Award (shared with Karan Johar)	Won	
Yeh Jawaani Hai Deewani	Bollywood Hungama Surfers' Choice Movie Awards	Best Director	Nominated	
Brahmāstra: Part One – Shiva	68th Filmfare Awards	Best Director	Nominated	
Brahmāstra: Part One – Shiva	International Indian Film Academy Awards	Best Director	Nominated	
Brahmāstra: Part One – Shiva	International Indian Film Academy Awards	Best Story	Nominated	
Brahmāstra: Part One – Shiva	Zee Cine Awards	Best Story	Nominated	
Brahmāstra: Part One – Shiva	Zee Cine Awards	Best Director	Won	
Brahmāstra: Part One – Shiva	News18 REEL Movie Awards	Best Director	Won	
Brahmāstra: Part One – Shiva	Bollywood Life Awards	Best Director	Nominated	
Brahmāstra: Part One – Shiva	70th National Film Awards	Best Film in AVGC	Won	
