= Sangay Tsheltrim =

Bhutanese bodybuilder and actor

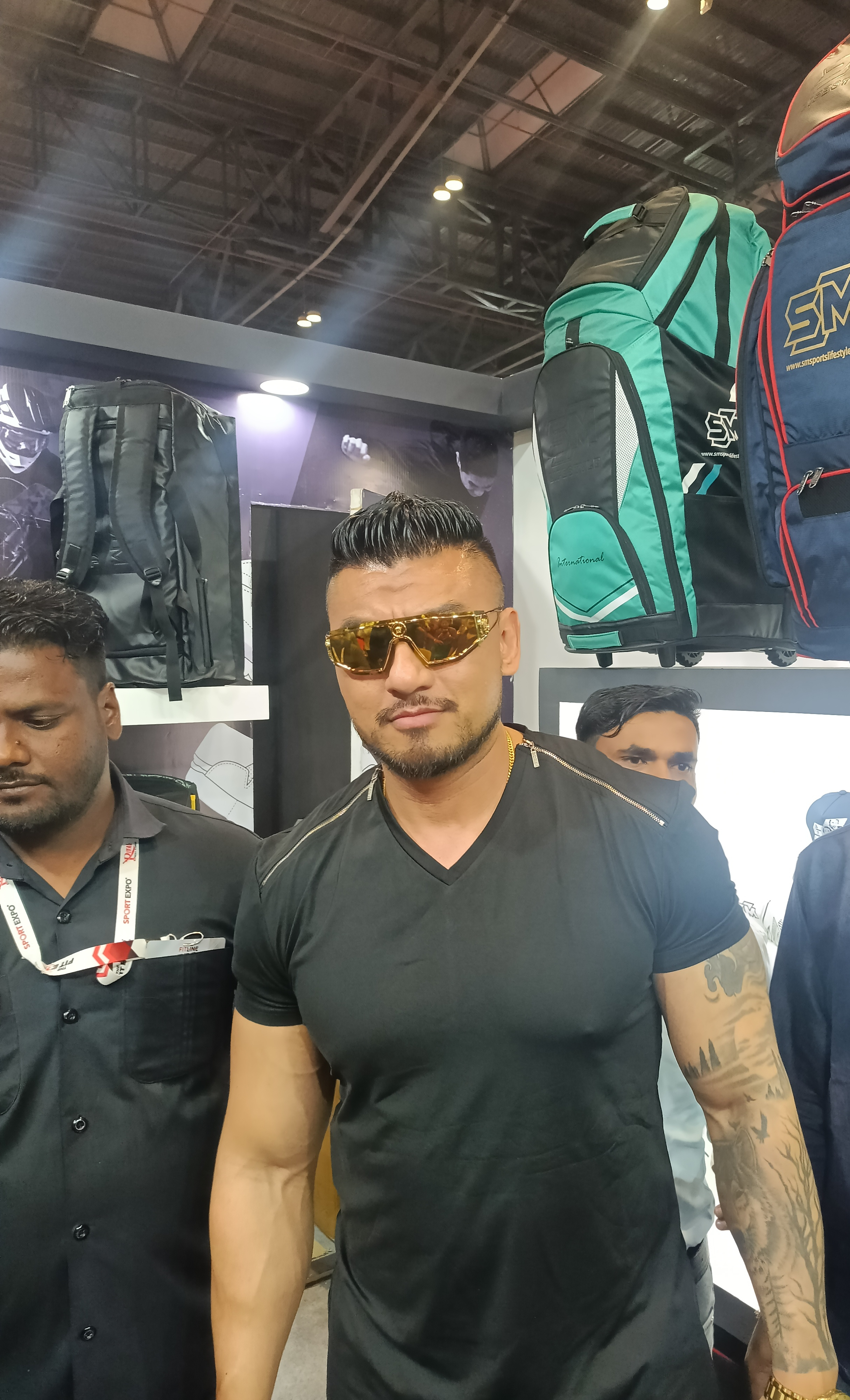
- Sangay Tsheltrim
- Born: Phuntsholing, Chhukha, Bhutan
- Other names: Mr Bhutan, Mr Asia
- Occupation: Actor
- Years active: 2018–present
- Spouse: Khendum Dorji

Sangay Tsheltrim is a Bhutanese actor and a former captain of the Royal Bodyguard of Bhutan of the Royal Bhutan Army.

== Career ==
Tsheltrim began his military career as a lieutenant and later rising to captain in the Royal Bhutan Army after completing four years of military training at the National Defence Academy (NDA) and the Indian Military Academy (IMA) in India. He later took voluntary retirement from the Royal Body Guards of Bhutan to pursue a career in bodybuilding.

In 2015, he won a gold medal at the Asian Bodybuilding Championships in Uzbekistan, becoming the first Bhutanese athlete to win a gold medal at an Asian bodybuilding championship. He later won the Mr. Bhutan title in 2017.

In 2018, after retiring from competitive bodybuilding, he transitioned into acting and began pursuing a career in the Bhutanese film industry.

He first worked in his debut Bhutanese film Singye (trans. Lion), which was a commercial success. He made his Bollywood debut with Salman Khan, starring in the film Radhe. Later that year, he was a lead actor in Haider Khan directed documentary film Rohingya - People from Nowhere.

In 2023, he acted in his second home-coming Bhutanese film, Lingpoen (trans. Major), which was a massive hit in the country, also directed by Haider Khan in his Bhutanese directorial debut. He also worked alongside Shah Rukh Khan later that year in Jawan as a police officer. He made a debut in Telugu movie in 2025 with Akhanda 2.

== Filmography ==
Year	Title	Role	Language	Notes
2018	Singye		Dzongkha	
2021	Radhe	Lota	Hindi	
2021	Rohingya - People from Nowhere	Major Arjun	Hindi	
2023	Lingpoen		Dzongkha	
2023	Agent	Khalid	Telugu	
2023	The Freelancer	Gurung Thapa	Hindi	TV series
2023	Jawan	Juju	Hindi	
2024	Ruslaan	Lee	Hindi	
2025	Akhanda 2: Thaandavam	General Xiang Lee	Telugu	
2026	Alpha	Captain Bhupen Rawat	Hindi	
