= Tiger Zinda Hai =

2017 Indian film by Ali Abbas Zafar

- Theatrical release poster
- Directed by: Ali Abbas Zafar
- Written by: Ali Abbas Zafar
- Story by: Neelesh Misra; Ali Abbas Zafar
- Produced by: Aditya Chopra
- Starring: Salman Khan; Katrina Kaif; Sajjad Delafrooz; Angad Bedi; Kumud Mishra; Girish Karnad; Paresh Rawal
- Cinematography: Marcin Laskawiec
- Edited by: Rameshwar S. Bhagat
- Music by: Songs: Vishal–Shekhar; Score: Julius Packiam
- Production company: Yash Raj Films
- Distributed by: Yash Raj Films
- Release date: 22 December 2017
- Running time: 162 minutes
- Country: India
- Language: Hindi
- Budget: ₹130 crore
- Box office: ₹564.2 crore

Tiger Zinda Hai (transl. 'Tiger Is Alive') is a 2017 Indian Hindi-language action thriller film written and directed by Ali Abbas Zafar and produced by Aditya Chopra under Yash Raj Films. It is a sequel to Ek Tha Tiger (2012) and the second installment in the YRF Spy Universe. The film stars Salman Khan and Katrina Kaif who reprise their roles from the predecessor. Five years after the events of Ek Tha Tiger, Tiger and Zoya find themselves pulled out of hiding to save nurses held hostage by the ISC, a terrorist organisation based in Iraq.

A sequel was conceived following the success of Ek Tha Tiger, but faced several delays after Kabir Khan, who scripted and helmed the prequel, refused to return for a sequel. Zafar was subsequently hired as the writer and director, having last worked with Salman on Sultan (2016); Misra, who had written the script for Ek Tha Tiger alongside Kabir, contributed to the story, which is inspired from the 2014 abduction of Indian nurses by ISIL. Filming took place in Abu Dhabi, Austria, Greece, and Morocco. Made on a budget of ₹1.3 billion (US$19.96 million), it was one of the most expensive Hindi films ever made at time of its release.

Tiger Zinda Hai was theatrically released worldwide on 22 December 2017, to positive reviews from critics. Similar to its predecessor, the film set numerous box-office records during its theatrical run, grossing over ₹5.65 billion (US$86.76 million) worldwide, becoming the third highest-grossing Indian film of 2017. At the 63rd Filmfare Awards, the film won for Best Action.

== Plot ==
In 2017, almost five years after the events of Ek Tha Tiger, an American journalist is killed by the ISC, a terrorist organisation, in Iraq while attempting to report its recent activities to the CIA. During a rally in Ikrit, the ISC's leader, Abu Usman, is shot by the Iraqi Army and taken to a local hospital that also serves as a training centre for Indian and Pakistani nurses. Fearing for his safety, Usman orders an increased ISC presence around the hospital, prompting the CIA to prepare an airstrike. Meanwhile, Maria, an Indian nurse, secretly contacts the Indian Ambassador to Iraq and reveals that Indian and Pakistani nurses are being held hostage. The CIA informs RAW chief Shenoy that he has seven days to rescue them before the strike is carried out.

Avinash Singh "Tiger" Rathore and Zoya Nazar, (Note: As depicted at the ending of Ek Tha Tiger (2012).) now married with a son, Junior, live in hiding in Innsbruck. Shenoy and RAW agent Karan Rao locate them and explain the situation. Although Tiger is initially reluctant to undertake the mission, he agrees after Zoya insists. He travels to Syria with a select team of RAW agents: Azaan, an expert sniper; Namit, a bomb disposal specialist; and Rakesh, a hacker. They enter Iraq posing as illegal migrant workers at an oil refinery operated by Tohbaan, an Indian sympathiser of the ISC, and Amir Baghdawi, Usman's second-in-command.

In Ikrit, Tiger meets his handler, Pawan, to collect supplies. However, they are forced to rescue Hassan, a child suicide bomber sent by Usman. During the ensuing confrontation, the ISC shoots Pawan, and Tiger narrowly escapes when Zoya unexpectedly arrives. The couple decide that the Indian and Pakistani intelligence agencies, RAW and ISI, must work together to rescue the nurses. That night, Tiger and his team stage a controlled explosion at the refinery and fake burn injuries to gain admission to the hospital. There, Tiger discovers that Tohbaan is actually Firdaus, an undercover RAW agent assigned by Shenoy to monitor Tiger and his team.

Tiger and Zoya agree to launch coordinated attacks against the ISC. Zoya goes undercover and is eventually recruited by Baghdawi, who keeps female slaves. On the day of the planned airstrike, she kills Baghdawi. Meanwhile, Rakesh poisons the food that the migrant workers have been ordered to prepare for the ISC. Tiger and his team exploit the resulting disruption to eliminate most of the terrorist forces, but Azaan is killed in the fighting.

Tiger discovers that Usman has captured Zoya in the hospital's boiler room and surrenders to save her. After initially being tortured, Tiger stabs Usman, who nevertheless manages to escape. Tiger attempts to free Zoya while RAW and ISI agents rescue the hostages. As the American airstrike destroys the hospital, Firdaus kills Usman.

A year later, on 15 August, Shenoy receives a call from Tiger, who is in Greece. Tiger reveals that he and Zoya have adopted Hassan and that his family has returned to hiding, knowing that RAW and ISI would otherwise continue to pursue them. Nevertheless, he assures Shenoy that he will always be ready to serve his country.

== Cast ==
- Salman Khan as Avinash "Tiger" Singh Rathore / Manish Chandra (fake), a former RAW agent in hiding with his wife, Zoya
- Katrina Kaif as Zoya Nazar Jung, an ISI agent in hiding with her husband, Tiger
- Sajjad Delafrooz as Abu Usman, the leader of the ISC, an Iraqi terrorist group
- Girish Karnad as Ajit Shenoy, the chief of RAW
- Paresh Rawal as Firdaus, an undercover RAW agent from Saharanpur, UP posing as an ISC sympathiser, Tohbaan
- Kumud Mishra as Rakesh Prasad Chaurasia, a hacker for RAW
- Angad Bedi as Captain Namit Khanna, a RAW agent who is a bomb disposal expert
- Paresh Pahuja as Major Azaan Akbar, a sniper for RAW (from the Ghatak Force)
- Anant Vidhaat Sharma as Karan Rao, Shenoy's assistant in RAW
- Gavie Chahal as Captain Abrar Sheikh, an ISI agent
- Danish Bhatt as Captain Javed Baig, an ISI agent
- Anupriya Goenka as Poorna, a hostage nurse
- Neha Hinge as Maria, a hostage nurse
- Kashmira Irani as Sana, a hostage nurse
- Nawab Shah as Pawan, an undercover RAW agent and Tiger's handler in Iraq
- Sal Yusuf as Amir Al-Baghdawi, an ISC member and Usman's second-in-command
- Sartaaj Kakkar as Junior, Tiger and Zoya's son
- Jineet Rath as Hassan Ali, Tiger's adopted son from Iraq
- Ivan Sylvester Rodrigues as Ambassador of India to Iraq
- Siddhartha Basu as Indian External Affairs Minister
- Tyler Gowardhan as James Forward
- Levi Avelino as Pedro
- Steve Lorrigan as Adam Kerry, Director of the Central Intelligence Agency

== Production ==
Filming took place in Abu Dhabi, Austria, Greece and Morocco. The song "Swag Se Swagat" was shot in the Aegean island of Naxos, Greece in October 2017. Iranian actor Sajjad Delafrooz was roped in to play the role of Abu Usman, the leader of the fictional terrorist organisation ISC. Delafrooz had briefly starred in the 2015 Hindi film Baby.

The film's budget was reportedly ₹120−130 crore.($18.43 million). It marked the final Hindi film appearance of Girish Karnad, who plays RAW Chief Shenoy; due to his ongoing illness and treatment at the time, Shenoy was subsequently depicted as being on medical support in his scenes in the film.

== Marketing and release ==
The film's trailer was released on 6 November 2017. Within 24 hours, it broke many records for Hindi film trailers on YouTube, with more than 29 million views, 480 thousand likes and 250 thousand shares. On 11 November, it became the most liked film trailer on YouTube with 700 thousand likes, surpassing Star Wars: The Force Awakens (2015) then. The record was later surpassed by the trailer of Avengers: Infinity War (2018) with about 2 million likes.

The film was released on 22 December 2017 worldwide. The film received a U/A certificate from Central Board of Film Certification. Despite having a song featuring Pakistani singer Atif Aslam, the film has not been given No-Objection Certificate by Central Board of Film Censors in Pakistan, stating the reason as was said for Ek Tha Tiger that "The image of Pakistan and its law enforcement agencies" have been compromised.

Tiger Zinda Hai was in controversy on its release and faced protests from the Valmiki community, when Salman Khan allegedly made a casteist slur, where he compared his dancing skills to a sanitation worker, "or "bhangi" in a dance show. Shilpa Shetty also laughed along with him, and said that she also looked like one. Valmiki group is made up of a cluster of Dalit communities — a few of whom are Bhangi, Mehtar, Chuhra, Lal Beghi and Halalkhor. Valmiki community filed a legal case against both actors for hurting their sentiments.

Maharashtra Navnirman Sena also unsuccessfully protested urging Mumbai multiplexes to promote Marathi film Deva instead of Tiger Zinda Hai. Their leaders raised issue about the loss of screens to Marathi films like Deva and Ek Atrangi which released alongside.

== Reception ==
=== Critical response ===
Tiger Zinda Hai opened to mostly positive reviews. On the review aggregator website Rotten Tomatoes, 64% of 14 critics' reviews are positive, with an average rating of 6.1/10.

Taran Adarsh of Bollywood Hungama gave 4.5 out of 5 stars and wrote "On the whole, TIGER ZINDA HAI is a high-octane masala entertainer that stays true to its genre and delivers what it promises: King-sized entertainment. At the box office, the audiences will give the film an epic ‘swagat’ as it is bound to entertain them thoroughly. This one is a SURE SHOT BLOCKBUSTER and nothing can stop it from setting new records." Umesh Punwani of Koimoi gave 4 out of 5 stars and wrote "Katrina Kaif is brilliant! She has very few dialogues, and no, that's not the reason she's good. Working amazingly well with her expressions, she has turned into an athlete for this one. Performing a few major action sequences, she is flawless."

Aarti Jhurani of The National gave 4 out of 5 stars and wrote "While logic is not a very important factor in Khan's films, emotions certainly are, and the director made sure to hit all the soft spots – from patriotism to Indo-Pakistan bonding to a multitude of cheesy dialogues – which is a smart move, and sure to bring in both Indian and Pakistani audiences." Lasyapriya Sundaram of The Times of India gave 3.5 out of 5 stars and wrote "The film is visually stunning in parts and Salman Khan plays Tiger with roaring confidence and dialogues packed with punch. Of course, his fans get a true-blue Salman Khan moment when he bares his torso." Rachit Gupta of Filmfare gave 3.5 out of 5 stars and wrote "It may look like a Hollywood action thriller, but at its heart, Tiger Zinda Hai is an unabashed masala movie. The heady mixture of an international-looking action film and the regular tropes of Hindi cinema make it a pleasing watch."

Rohit Bhatnagar of Deccan Chronicle gave 3 out of 5 stars and wrote "Ali Abbas Zafar smoothly takes Ek Tha Tiger franchise ahead by telling a real story and inserting a whole lot of drama and thrill. The film also touches upon relationships between India and Pakistan but subtly. The biggest hiccup of the film is its length." Rajeev Masand of News 18 gave 3 out of 5 stars and wrote "The film has some thrilling action, while logic and subtlety are sacrificed at the altar of spectacle and sentiment. Katrina gets some terrific action moments, and she executes them well, but make no mistake, the heavy lifting here is left to Salman Khan, and he's clearly up for the challenge."

Richa Barua of Asianet News gave 4.5 out of 5 stars and states that the film "keeps you glued to the seats." Raja Sen of NDTV gave 2.5 out of 5 stars and wrote "Tiger Zinda Hai breaks for intermission at a point when most self-respecting action films would have rushed into the climax. Long before the finish eventually rolled around, I found myself wishing Tiger would croak just so I could make it out alive." Rohit Vats of Hindustan Times gave 2.5 out of 5 stars and wrote "It's better for the filmmakers to set a character trajectory that matches the star's current image rather than basking in the glory of the past." Anna M. M. Vetticad of Firstpost gave 2.5 out of 5 stars stating that both Salman Khan and Katrina Kaif delivered fun with equal parts swag, silliness and schmaltz. Shubhra Gupta of Indian Express gave 2.5 out of 5 stars and wrote "Only once in a while, the film gives in and provides us with a killing which sobers us up, but very quickly it's back to the base, with Bhai taking over, and everyone including Nurse Poorna and Zoya making way for him. But you can see she enjoys kicking butt: you wish she had more to do." Anupama Chopra of Film Companion wrote, "Tiger Zinda Hai is fun in bits and spurts, but there isn’t enough buoyancy to make it a slam dunk."

=== Box office ===
==== India ====
Tiger Zinda Hai made a new non-holiday record in India as it collected ₹34.1 crore nett on its first day. It went on to collect ₹35.30 crore nett gross on second day. The film recorded the second highest day of all time (after the third day of Bahubali 2: The Conclusion's Hindi-dub) on its third day with a nett of ₹45.53 crore and the highest ever for the Hindi film industry. With three-day nett collections of over ₹1.14 billion, Tiger Zinda Hai had the second highest opening weekend of all time (after Bahubali 2: The Conclusion) and the highest opening weekend of all time in the Hindi film industry. Tiger Zinda Hai netted Rs 154 crore in its first four days in India.

==== Other territories ====
Tiger Zinda Hai grossed $2 million in two days, $450,000 on day one in US/Canada and around £150,000 in the UK. The film grossed $7 million in its opening weekend in overseas, including $2,535,825 in US/Canada. The film grossed ₹190 crore worldwide in its opening weekend. In the United Kingdom, it grossed £1.8 million ($2.32 million) in 2017, making it the year's highest-grossing foreign-language film in the UK (above Baahubali 2 in second place).

As of 25 February 2018, the film has grossed US$87.32 million (₹569 crore) worldwide, including ₹434.82 crore (US$67.11 million) in India, and US$20.3 million (₹128.9 crore) overseas.

== Music ==
The film's soundtrack was composed by Vishal–Shekhar with lyrics written by Irshad Kamil. The background score was composed by Julius Packiam. The first single Swag Se Swagat sung by Vishal Dadlani and Neha Bhasin and produced by Meghdeep Bose released on 19 November 2017. It has become the most-liked Bollywood song on YouTube and the fastest Bollywood song to cross 100 million views on YouTube. The second song of the film, Dil Diyan Gallan, which is sung by Atif Aslam, was released by Salman Khan and Katrina Kaif on Big Boss Season 11 on 26 November 2017. The album was released on 12 December 2017 by YRF Music. The Arabic version of "Swag Se Swagat" was sung by Rabih Baroud and Brigitte Yaghi.

By 8 February 2018, the album had crossed 1 billion streams on music streaming platforms. As of 13 April 2019, songs from the album have over 1.5 billion views combined on YouTube, making it the most-streamed Bollywood soundtrack album on the platform.

== Accolades ==
Date of ceremony	Award	Category	Recipient(s) and nominee(s)	Result	Ref.
20 January 2018	Filmfare Awards	Best Action	Tom Struthers	Won	
28 January 2018	Mirchi Music Awards	Album of The Year	Vishal–Shekhar, Irshad Kamil	Nominated	
22 June 2018	IIFA Awards	Best Cinematography	Marcin Laskawiec, Usc	Won	
22 June 2018	IIFA Awards	Best Sound Design	Dileep Subramaniam, Ganesh Gangadharan (YRF Studios)	Won	

== Sequel ==
A sequel, Tiger 3, the fifth instalment in the YRF Spy Universe, was released on 12 November 2023. Based on a story by producer Aditya Chopra, and written by Shridhar Raghavan and Anckur Chaudhry, the sequel was directed by Maneesh Sharma, who replaced Zafar. Salman Khan and Katrina Kaif reprised their roles while Emraan Hashmi played the antagonist. Salman also reprised his role as Tiger in the 2023 film Pathaan, the fourth instalment of the Universe starring Shah Rukh Khan as the titular character, which was the first film to establish a crossover between the Tiger films and the third, independent instalment, War (2019), which introduced Hrithik Roshan as Major Kabir Dhaliwal. Both War and Pathaan were directed by Siddharth Anand.
