= Shridhar Raghavan =

Indian film screenwriter

- Occupation: Screenwriter
- Years active: 2000–present
- Family: Sriram Raghavan (brother)

Shridhar Raghavan is an Indian screenwriter known for his work in Hindi films. He has written the screenplays for the YRF Spy Universe films War (2019), Pathaan (2023), Tiger 3 (2023), War 2 (2025), and Alpha (2026). He won National Film Award for Best Screenplay for Apaharan (2005).

== Personal life ==
Shridhar Raghavan is the brother of writer-director Sriram Raghavan.

== Filmography ==
Year	Title	Notes
2000–2018	CID	Television series
2002	Achanak 37 Saal Baad	Television series
2004	Khakee	
2004	Deewar	
2005	Apaharan	
2005	Bluffmaster!	
2006	Family	
2009	Chandni Chowk to China	
2011	Dum Maaro Dum	
2015	Yennai Arindhaal	Tamil film; script consultant
2019	Criminal Justice	Television series
2019	War	
2021	Shiddat	
2023	Pathaan	
2023	The Night Manager	Television series
2023	Jawan	Script consultant
2023	Tiger 3	
2024	Yudhra	
2025	War 2	
2026	Alpha	
2026	Ramayana: Part 1	Adaptation of Valmiki Ramayana
2027	Ramayana: Part 2 †	Adaptation of Valmiki Ramayana
