= Tiger 3 =

2023 Indian film by Maneesh Sharma

- Theatrical release poster
- Directed by: Maneesh Sharma
- Screenplay by: Shridhar Raghavan
- Dialogues by: Anckur Chaudhry
- Story by: Aditya Chopra
- Produced by: Aditya Chopra
- Starring: Salman Khan; Katrina Kaif; Emraan Hashmi; Revathi; Simran; Aamir Bashir
- Cinematography: Anay Goswamy
- Edited by: Rameshwar S. Bhagat
- Music by: Songs: Pritam; Score: Tanuj Tiku
- Production company: Yash Raj Films
- Distributed by: Yash Raj Films
- Release date: 12 November 2023
- Running time: 156 minutes
- Country: India
- Language: Hindi
- Budget: ₹300 crore
- Box office: ₹466.63 crore

Tiger 3 (Note: Commonly abbreviated as T3) is a 2023 Indian Hindi-language action thriller film directed by Maneesh Sharma and produced by Aditya Chopra under Yash Raj Films. Based on a script written by Shridhar Raghavan and Anckur Chaudhry, from an original story by Chopra, the film serves as the fifth installment in the YRF Spy Universe; a circumquel to Ek Tha Tiger (2012) and Tiger Zinda Hai (2017), it is set after the events of War (2019) and Pathaan, and stars Salman Khan, Katrina Kaif and Emraan Hashmi in the lead roles, with Revathi, Simran, Kumud Mishra, Ranvir Shorey, Vishal Jethwa, Riddhi Dogra, and Aamir Bashir in pivotal roles, while Shah Rukh Khan appears in a cameo appearance. Exploring the origins of a mutual connection between Tiger and Zoya, it explores their attempts to prevent rogue ISI agent Aatish Rehman, Zoya's former mentor, from implementing a dangerous plot against India and Pakistan.

Principal photography began in March 2021 with filming taking place in Delhi, Mumbai, Istanbul, Saint Petersburg, and Vienna. Pritam composed the soundtrack, having been originally considered for Ek Tha Tiger, while the background score was composed by Tanuj Tiku, who took over duties from Julius Packiam from the 2012 original and the 2017 sequel. Made on an estimated budget of ₹300 crore, it is one of the most expensive Indian films and the second most expensive film produced by Yash Raj Films.

Tiger 3 was released on 12 November 2023 in standard, IMAX, 4DX and other premium formats, coinciding with Diwali. It received mixed reviews from critics, with praise for its action sequences, music, score, technical aspects and cast performances (particularly Khan, Kaif and Hashmi), but criticism for its plot and pacing. The film grossed ₹466.63 crore worldwide, emerging as the sixth highest-grossing Hindi film of 2023 and the ninth highest-grossing Indian film of 2023.

== Plot ==
In London, October 1999, a teenage Zoya witnesses her father, ISI agent Rehan Nazar, die in a car bomb blast. After his funeral, Zoya is visited by Nazar's protege Aatish Rehman, who persuades her to join the ISI.

In the present day, Avinash "Tiger" Singh Rathore is assigned by his late former boss Shenoy's (Note: Girish Karnad, who plays Shenoy, passed away in 2019. Shenoy was also depicted as being on medical support in Tiger Zinda Hai (2017), leaving his fate open to interpretation.) successor, RAW chief Maithili Menon, to rescue Tiger's former aid, Gopi Arya, who was captured during a mission in Afghanistan while trying to extract information from the Taliban about a mission being planned in Pakistan. Following his rescue, Gopi reveals to Tiger that Zoya is a double agent working for the Pakistanis, and is involved in the mission, before succumbing to his injuries. Tiger begins to spy on Zoya and is later assigned by Menon to safeguard an arms supplier, Jibran Sheikh in St. Petersburg, Russia, who worked with Gopi and escaped to the country after being discovered in Pakistan. Tiger witnesses Zoya's attempt to assassinate Sheikh; after saving him, Tiger is captured by Aatish, who reveals that he forced Zoya to assassinate Sheikh by near-fatally drugging and kidnapping her and Tiger's son Junior.

A flashback reveals Tiger's past links to both Zoya and Aatish: in 2011, Aatish sought to derail a peace treaty between India and Pakistan in Vienna by assassinating the Indian Army Chief, General Ribeiro. Aatish tasked Zoya with the job, but she refused to cooperate and uses the telephone to covertly make the Indian consulate eavesdrop, where, unknown to her, the call was received by Tiger, who was unaware of her identity back then. Aatish's pregnant wife Shaheen Baig decided to assassinate the general herself, but was shot and killed by Tiger. Aatish denied that his agents knew about the plan, leading to his imprisonment and ousting from the ISI.

Tiger recruits a team comprising Rakesh (Note: As previously shown in Tiger Zinda Hai (2017).) and Karan (Note: As previously shown in Tiger Zinda Hai (2017).) from his last known mission, the two of them being accompanied by newbie Nikhil, to steal a briefcase for Aatish, containing missile launch codes in Istanbul in exchange for Junior. However, Aatish has Tiger and Zoya framed as traitors by their respective countries, despite releasing Junior, leading to Tiger's imprisonment at a military prison in Northern Pakistan. Tiger is sentenced to death, but manages to escape with the help of Pathaan. He hides in Islamabad and meets his adopted son Hassan. (Note: As previously shown in Tiger Zinda Hai (2017).) Tiger's team, Zoya and ISI agents Abrar and Javed return to Islamabad, where they learn that Aatish and General Imtiaz Haq, the Army Chief of Pakistan, are planning to assassinate the Prime Minister of Pakistan Nasreen Irani in order for Aatish to replace her.

Seeking to save Irani, Tiger, Zoya and their team secretly enter Pakistan's PMO and expose Aatish's plan to Irani. Tiger and Zoya escort Irani to an underground bunker of Pakistan's PMO and Tiger forces General Haq to publicly reveal the plan. However, Aatish secretly kills General Haq with the help of Javed, who shockingly betrays Karan and Abrar by killing them. After they locate Irani, Hassan sacrifices himself, allowing Tiger and Zoya to help Irani escape; in the process, Tiger reveals to Aatish he knew about Javed's defection, having discovered his identity as Shaheen's brother. Zoya avenges Abrar and Karan's deaths by killing Javed. A fight ensues between Tiger and Aatish, ending with Tiger killing Aatish. Irani exposes Aatish's plot to the public. Tiger, Zoya and their team are proven innocent. Tiger contacts Menon and assures her that he will always be there to serve his country.

In the post-credits scene, Colonel Sunil Luthra contacts Kabir Dhaliwal and assigns him to assassinate an unidentified enemy.

== Cast ==
- Salman Khan as Avinash "Tiger" Singh Rathore, a former R&AW agent and Zoya's husband
- Katrina Kaif as Zoya Nazar Jung, a former ISI agent and Tiger's wife
  - Gurket Kaur as young Zoya
- Emraan Hashmi as Aatish Rehman, ex-Deputy Director-General of ISI
- Revathi as Maithili Menon, Chief of R&AW; Revathi fills in for Girish Karnad, with Menon succeeding Shenoy following his offscreen demise, which is not directly implied
- Simran as Nasreen Irani, Prime Minister of Pakistan
- Riddhi Dogra as Shaheen Baig, Aatish's wife and Javed's sister
- Vishal Jethwa as Hassan Ali, Tiger and Zoya's adoptive son
  - Jineet Rath as young Hassan (archival footage)
- Kumud Mishra as Rakesh Prasad Chaurasia
- Ranvir Shorey as Gopi Arya
- Aamir Bashir as Rehan Nazar, an ISI agent and Zoya's father
- Gavie Chahal as Major Abrar Sheikh, an ISI agent
- Anant Vidhaat Sharma as Karan Rao
- Danish Bhat as Captain Javed Baig, Shaheen's brother
- Sartaaj Kakkar as Junior, Tiger and Zoya's son
- Chandrachoor Rai as Nikhil
- Shahid Latief as General Imtiaz Haq, Chief of Pakistan Army
- Edward Sonnenblick as Dr. P. Hoffman
- Neeraj Purohit as Jibran Sheikh
- Danish Husain as General Wasim Riaz, Director-General of ISI
- Michelle Lee as General Zimou
- Anish Kuruvilla as Indian Prime Minister
- Denzil Smith as Indian Defence Minister
- Bimal Oberoi as General Keith Ribeiro, Chief of Indian Army
- Sandeep Kulkarni as Ramiz, Principal Secretary to the Prime Minister of Pakistan
- Varinder Singh Ghuman as Shakeel, Pakistani Prison Guard

Cameo appearances

- Shah Rukh Khan as Pathaan
- Hrithik Roshan as Major Kabir Dhaliwal (from War 2) in a post–credit scene
- Ashutosh Rana as Colonel Sunil Luthra (from War 2) in a post–credit scene

== Production ==
=== Development ===
In early 2020, it was reported that a sequel to Tiger Zinda Hai (2017) was in development, with Salman Khan and Katrina Kaif reprising their roles. In late 2020, Maneesh Sharma was roped in to direct the film, taking over from Ali Abbas Zafar who directed the previous installment. On 4 March 2022, the film was announced by YRF through an announcement video.

=== Casting ===
Shanoo Sharma was the film's casting director. Khan and Kaif were confirmed to reprise their roles as Tiger and Zoya respectively, with Emraan Hashmi cast as the antagonist, in February 2021. Ranvir Shorey was announced to return to the franchise, following his absence from Tiger Zinda Hai. Vishal Jethwa joined the cast in October 2021, while Revathi and Riddhi Dogra were cast a month later. Revathi was cast in the role of a new RAW chief who would succeed Girish Karnad's character Shenoy; Karnad's demise in 2019 led to Sharma and Chopra deciding on the character leap. Shah Rukh Khan and Hrithik Roshan reprised their roles as Pathaan and Major Kabir Dhaliwal, in cameo appearances respectively. Aside from the recurring characters in the universe, Kumud Mishra and Anand Vidhaat Sharma reprised their roles from the prequel. Character actor Chandrachoor Rai, who had appeared in Sharma's production debut, Dum Laga Ke Haisha (2015), was cast in a new role.

=== Filming ===
Principal photography began in the third week of March 2021, in Delhi and Mumbai. A customary puja was held on 26 February 2021 at YRF Studios in Mumbai. Filming then took place in Turkey, including Cappadocia, Antalya and Istanbul, while a car chase sequence was shot in Saint Petersburg in August 2021. Additional scenes were filmed in Austria (Vienna, Salzburg and Altaussee) in September 2021. Filming resumed in India by February 2022, in New Delhi, and further action sequences were filmed at Mumbai in April 2023. Shah Rukh Khan's cameo was filmed within a 10-day schedule in Madh Island, where a large set was constructed for an action sequence. Roshan's cameo was directed by Ayan Mukerji, the director of War 2. The entire filming was wrapped by May 2023.

== Music ==
The film's soundtrack was composed by Pritam, with lyrics written by Irshad Kamil and Amitabh Bhattacharya. The background score was composed by Tanuj Tiku. The album was preceded by two singles—"Leke Prabhu Ka Naam" and "Ruaan"—and was released under the YRF Music label on 28 October 2023.

== Marketing ==
A teaser titled "Tiger Ka Message" was released on 27 September 2023. The official trailer was released on 16 October 2023.

== Release ==
=== Theatrical ===
Tiger 3 was initially scheduled to be released on 21 April 2023, coinciding with Eid. It was then postponed to 12 November 2023 and was released across 8900 screens worldwide in Hindi with dubbed versions in Tamil and Telugu, coinciding with Diwali. The film was banned in Oman, Kuwait and Qatar due to its negative depiction of Islamic countries.

=== Home media ===
The film began streaming on Amazon Prime Video from 7 January 2024.

== Reception ==
=== Box office ===
As of 15 December 2023, Tiger 3 grossed over ₹345.78 crore (US$37 million) in India and ₹120.55 crore (US$13 million) in overseas markets for a worldwide total of over ₹466.63 crore (US$50 million).

The film set the record for the highest opening day on Diwali for a Hindi language film grossing ₹94 crore (US$10 million), including ₹7.76 crore (US$830,000) from paid previews in North America. The film's Hindi version netted a record-breaking ₹43 crore (US$4.6 million) in India, with a further ₹1.50 crore (US$160,000) from its dubbed Tamil and Telugu versions, for a net total of ₹44.50 crore (US$4.8 million). It had the biggest global opening weekend for both Khan and Kaif.

=== Critical response ===
On the review aggregator website Rotten Tomatoes, 55% of 22 critics' reviews are positive, with an average rating of 6.0/10.

Tiger 3 received mixed reviews from critics and audiences with praise for its action sequences, technical aspects and cast performances (particularly Salman Khan, Katrina Kaif and Emraan Hashmi), but criticism for its plot and pace.

Taran Adarsh of Bollywood Hungama gave 4/5 stars and wrote "Tiger 3 is the biggest dhamaka you can expect this Diwali" praised the second half and performances of Khan, Kaif and Hashmi and appreciated the cameo of Shahrukh Khan. Himesh Mankad of Pinkvilla gave 3.5/5 stars and wrote "Tiger 3 rides hugely mounted action sequences backed with power performances by Khan, Kaif and Hashmi. While pacing is an issue at some places, the core plot has enough of an emotional connect to keep you glued on the big screen. The film is an action-packed entertainer that has all the ingredients to emerge as Khan’s highest grosser till date." Sonil Dedhia of News18 gave 3.5/5 stars and wrote "Tiger 3 has some excellent action sequences featuring Khan and Kaif. Hashmi does justice to his role as an antagonist. There are many sweet-worthy moments in Tiger 3 including the cameos (which is known by everyone). Khan fans are in for a treat this Diwali." Vinamra Mathur of Firstpost gave 3.5/5 stars and wrote "Khan and Kaif submit themselves to the action of Tiger 3 with full gusto. The film looks stylish, slick, but little overlong. Only if it had more thrills and tension and less talking."

Ronak Kotecha of The Times of India gave 3/5 stars and wrote "Tiger 3 qualifies as a good addition to the franchise with enough ammo for mass entertainment." Zinia Bandyopadhyay of India Today gave 3/5 stars and wrote "Despite an overcrowded spy universe, Tiger 3 manages to hold his own ground. Khan fans won’t be disappointed, but someone give Kaif a Zoya series pronto!" Saibal Chatterjee of NDTV gave 2.5/5 stars and wrote "All the technical razzmatazz would have come to naught without the presence of a star or two who can add lustre, if only of a superficial kind, to the exercise." Shubhra Gupta of The Indian Express gave 2.5/5 stars and wrote "Khan is looking his age, but the good thing is that he isn’t hiding it. And of course, the best part of the film is when Pathaan a.k.a. Shah Rukh Khan comes flying into the horizon with his hair still in that sexy man-bun and shooting smart one-liners." Sukanya Verma of Rediff gave 2.5/5 stars and wrote "Too bad the one time it is friendly to the environment, Tiger chooses to celebrate his Diwali with 'meetha' and not 'pathaaka'."

Monika Rawal Kukreja of Hindustan Times wrote "Tiger 3 is massy, masala and a must-watch not because it's a masterpiece, but because it's not every day you see two superstars sharing screen space even if that's for a little while. Sharma as director packs all the elements in a manner that it makes for an intriguing watch. While the story and broad plot is quite intricate and complex with a new twist and turn waiting to unfold every few minutes, what remains problematic is the inconsistent pace." Pratikshya Mishra of The Quint wrote "Tiger 3 is one of those films that didn’t need to have relied on pure action – the love story between Tiger and Zoya is the Tiger franchise’s main attraction. Instead, Tiger 3 focuses on a heady mix of a saviour complex and exposition. Despite new additions to the roster and older, familiar faces returning to the mix, Tiger 3 just doesn’t have the thrill and chutzpah required to make the story work.

== Accolades ==
Award	Ceremony date	Category	Recipients	Result	Ref.
Filmfare Awards	29 January 2024	Best Supporting Actor	Emraan Hashmi	Nominated	
Filmfare Awards	29 January 2024	Best Action	Franz Spilhaus, Oh Sea Young and Sunil Rodrigues	Nominated	
International Indian Film Academy Awards	28 September 2024	Best Villain	Emraan Hashmi	Nominated	
