= War 2 (film) =

2025 Indian film by Ayan Mukerji

- Theatrical release poster
- Directed by: Ayan Mukerji
- Screenplay by: Shridhar Raghavan
- Dialogues by: Abbas Tyrewala
- Story by: Aditya Chopra
- Produced by: Aditya Chopra
- Starring: Hrithik Roshan; N. T. Rama Rao Jr.; Kiara Advani; Anil Kapoor; Ashutosh Rana
- Cinematography: Benjamin Jasper
- Edited by: Aarif Sheikh
- Music by: Songs: Pritam; Score: Sanchit Balhara and Ankit Balhara
- Production company: Yash Raj Films
- Distributed by: Yash Raj Films (Note: As a main distribution for India and worldwide. Others distribution for Telugu and Tamil version, see distribution section in below.)
- Release date: 14 August 2025
- Running time: 173 minutes
- Country: India
- Language: Hindi
- Budget: ₹300–400 crore (Note: News18 published that the budget ranges between ₹300–400 crore. Mint reported the budget as ₹300 crore. Bollywood Hungama reported the budget as ₹400 crore.)
- Box office: ₹303.22–364 crore (Note: War 2's reported worldwide grosses vary between ₹303.22 crore (Bollywood Hungama) – ₹364 crore (Outlook India, The Hollywood Reporter India))

War 2 is a 2025 Indian Hindi-language action thriller film directed by Ayan Mukerji and produced by Aditya Chopra under Yash Raj Films. Based on a script written by Shridhar Raghavan and Abbas Tyrewala, from an original story by Chopra, it is the sixth installment in the YRF Spy Universe, circumquel to the 2019 film War and set after the events of Pathaan and Tiger 3 (both 2023). The film stars Hrithik Roshan and N. T. Rama Rao Jr. (in his Hindi film debut) in the lead roles, alongside Kiara Advani, Anil Kapoor and Ashutosh Rana in pivotal roles. It follows Kabir Dhaliwal, a former RAW agent, who, after going rogue, becomes a major threat to national security, and a special units officer, Vikram Chelapathi, is assigned to neutralise him.

Principal photography took place from October 2023 to July 2025. The film was shot extensively in Mumbai with sporadic schedules taking place in Spain, Italy and Abu Dhabi. The film's soundtrack is composed by Pritam while Sanchit Balhara and Ankit Balhara composed the film score. Made on an estimated budget of ₹300–400 crore, it is one of the most expensive Indian films ever made.

War 2 was released on 14 August 2025, coinciding with the Indian Independence Day weekend to mixed-to-negative reviews from critics and underperformed at the box office, though it became the fourth-highest grossing film of 2025.

== Plot ==
Nearly six years after going rogue and eliminating Saurabh and Rizwan Ilyasi, (Note: As shown in War (2019); a promised subplot involving Farid Haqqani in the final minutes has had not materialized) Kabir works as a freelance mercenary for international clients. After assassinating a gangster in Japan, he travels to Germany, where a client drugs him and transports him to India. There, he is introduced to the Kali Cartel, a powerful criminal syndicate from India and neighbouring countries seeking to infiltrate and control the Indian government. Unbeknown to the cartel, Colonel Sunil Luthra had secretly tasked Kabir two years earlier with infiltrating it, creating the impression that he had gone rogue and left RAW.

The cartel orders Kabir to assassinate Luthra, who himself coerces Kabir into carrying out the killing. Despite his emotional conflict, Kabir complies, earning the cartel's trust and gaining access to its Indian leader, businessman Gautam Gulati. Meanwhile, RAW receives footage of Luthra's death, prompting Lieutenant Colonel Vikrant Kaul to become RAW chief. Luthra's daughter and Kabir's former lover, Wing Commander Kavya, joins the hunt for Kabir and vows revenge. On Defence Minister Vilasrao Sarang's recommendation, Special Unit Officer Major Vikram Chelapathi also joins the team.

Kabir is tracked to Spain, where he visits his adoptive daughter Ruhi. Vikram pursues him on a high-speed train but lets him escape before it crashes. Kabir ensures Ruhi's safety with Khalid's mother in Manali. Later, at an ISIS training camp in Yemen, Gulati orders Kabir to assassinate Sarang's family aboard a chartered flight. A clue deliberately left by Kabir leads Vikram to discover his true mission, and Vikram agrees to help him. Kabir hijacks the flight with a stealth bomber and, aided by Vikram, kills the attackers. Vikram then reveals himself as a cartel member, murders Sarang's family and ejects Kabir from the aircraft, cryptically calling him “Kaboo” and triggering memories of his past.

In 1999, 15-year-old Kabir becomes homeless in Mumbai's slums after his widowed father commits suicide. He befriends Raghu, and both are eventually sent to a juvenile detention center after a robbery. Luthra, then an army major, encourages the inmates to join the army. Kabir and Raghu pass the physical tests, but Raghu fails the emotional evaluation for prioritising himself over the country. With Luthra's support, Kabir enlists, leaving Raghu behind. Feeling betrayed, Raghu escapes and is later revealed to have become Vikram.

In the present, Kabir tracks Gulati to Abu Dhabi and attempts to kill him, but Vikram intervenes, kills Gulati and frames Kabir in RAW's eyes. Kabir escapes after a boat chase. He later reunites with Kavya in Italy, revealing his mission and Vikram's identity. When they attempt to alert Sarang, they discover that he is himself a cartel member. Sarang had orchestrated Vikram's infiltration and the murder of his own family to gain public sympathy and advance his bid to become Prime Minister. Kabir and Kavya are rescued by Kaul.

At the World Economic Forum in Davos, Sarang and Vikram plan to assassinate the Prime Minister. Kabir kills Sarang but spares Vikram, who survives. The event is cancelled, and Kavya and Kaul prepare to escort the Prime Minister to Delhi, but cartel members posing as security officers attack them. They defeat the attackers and depart. Vikram later confronts Kabir in an ice cave, where he reminds him the ultimate fate of Khalid and Naina, and is defeated. He explains that his resentment stems from Kabir's perceived betrayal in their youth, despite his continued loyalty to him. Recognising Vikram's humanity, Kabir persuades him to help dismantle the cartel. Meanwhile, Kaul announces that Sarang and Vikram, declared a martyr, were killed by Kabir.

Nine months later, Vikram is revealed to be alive and secretly helps Kabir eliminate the remaining cartel leaders. They part ways, agreeing to reunite if another threat emerges. Kabir assures Kaul that he will always serve his country and rekindles his relationship with Kavya.

In the post-credits scene, an unidentified man (Note: identified off-screen as Fateh Singh Lakhawat) tattoos the Greek letter α on a young girl's arm, inducting her into a covert government programme called Alpha.

== Cast ==
- Hrithik Roshan as Major Kabir Dhaliwal
  - Manthan Darji as young Kabir "Kaboo"
- N. T. Rama Rao Jr. as Major Vikram Chelapathi
  - Hearty Singh as young Vikram "Raghu"
- Kiara Advani as Wing Commander Kavya Luthra, Sunil Luthra's daughter
- Anil Kapoor as Lieutenant Colonel Vikrant Kaul, Chief of R&AW
- Ashutosh Rana as Colonel Sunil Luthra, former Chief of R&AW
- Varun Badola as Defence Minister Vilasrao Sarang
- K. C. Shankar as Gautam Gulati, Kali Head (India)
- Arista Mehta as Ruhi Sahni, Kabir's adoptive daughter
- Karan Kishore as Karan
- Imroz Maur as Imroz
- Reshma Bombaywala as Contractor
- Vijay Vikram Singh as a Military Officer
- Hardip Dhupia as Captain Bakshi
- Anupam Bhattacharya as Naval Commander
- Ajit Koshy as General Kazi
- Dumani Mtya as Michael Barbossa
- Benedict Garrett as Alexis
- Madhuri Bhatia as Kali Head (Bangladesh)
- Hidayat Sami as Kali Head (Pakistan)
- Hemant Mahaur as Kali Head (Sri Lanka)
- Anil Rai as Kali Head (Myanmar)
- Nelson Liao as Kali Head (China)
- Cesar Lorente Raton as Kali Head (Russia)
- Kwon Sung Jong as Japanese mob boss

Cameo appearances

- Soni Razdan as Nafisa Rahmani, Khalid's mother
- Tiger Shroff as Captain Khalid Rahmani (archive footage from War and a photographic appearance in Nafisa's apartment)
- Bobby Deol as Fateh Singh Lakhawat (from Alpha) in the post-credit scene
- Khushi Hajare as a young Sita Kaul (from Alpha) in the post-credit scene
- Vaani Kapoor as Naina Sahni (archive footage from War)

== Production ==
=== Development ===
At the launch party of War in October 2019, when asked about a sequel, director Siddharth Anand confirmed he was working on the script and had plans to convert the film into a franchise, depending on the audience's response to the film. In April 2023, Yash Raj Films confirmed the sequel and sixth instalment in the universe titled War 2. Ayan Mukerji was signed as the director replacing Anand, marking his first film in the universe, and first venture outside of Dharma Productions.

=== Casting ===
Shanoo Sharma was the casting director. Hrithik Roshan reprises his role from War. N. T. Rama Rao Jr. was cast in April 2023, marking his debut in Hindi cinema. Kiara Advani was cast in July 2023. Ashutosh Rana confirmed he would reprise his role from War and Pathaan (2023). Roshan reprised his role in a cameo appearance in the post-credits scene of Tiger 3 which was directed by Mukerji himself. Anil Kapoor was cast in July 2024. Bobby Deol made a cameo appearance in the post-credits scene of the film. He reprised his role in the seventh installment of the universe, Alpha.

=== Filming ===
Principal photography began in October 2023 in Salamanca, where a car chase sequence was filmed. Due to Roshan and Rao having schedules in Mumbai and Hyderabad for Fighter and Devara: Part 1 respectively, stunt doubles were used. In December 2023, filming took place in Abu Dhabi where a boat chase sequence choreographed by Franz Spilhaus was filmed. Additional sequences were filmed at the Yas Marina Circuit.

In March 2024, Roshan shot his introductory sequence in Mumbai. A set resembling a Shaolin Monastery was constructed for the katana fight sequence. In April 2024, Roshan and Rao filmed an aerial action sequence in Vile Parle. In August 2024, Advani filmed an action sequence at the Infiniti Mall, Malad. In September 2024, a 15-day schedule took place in Italy across Venice, Lake Como, Naples, Tuscany, Sorrento Peninsula, and the Amalfi Coast where a song featuring Advani and Roshan along with a few action sequences, were filmed. In October 2024, a 40-man action sequence featuring Rao was shot in Andheri.

The film's climax was shot in December 2024 at Film City and YRF Studios in Mumbai, choreographed by Anal Arasu, Spiro Razatos, Craig Macrae, Se-yeong Oh and Sunil Rodrigues. The dance sequence "Janaab-e-Aali" choreographed by Bosco Martis, was scheduled to be filmed in March 2025 featuring more than 500 background dancers; however, it was delayed after Roshan sustained a leg injury during the rehearsals, and was later filmed in the first week of July 2025. Rao began dubbing in the same month. Filming also wrapped simultaneously.

== Music ==
The soundtrack album consists of 8 compositions, composed by Pritam and Sanchit Balhara and Ankit Balhara; with lyrics written by Amitabh Bhattacharya. The film score was composed by Sanchit and Ankit Balhara. The first single titled "Aavan Jaavan" was released on 31 July 2025. The second single titled "Janaab-e-Aali" was teased on 7 August 2025. The full song premiered in theaters along with the film. The full album was released on 16 August 2025.

== Marketing ==
The film's teaser was released on 20 May 2025, coinciding with Rao's 42nd birthday. The teaser was heavily criticised for its low-grade visuals, production quality and action choreography. Some fans also expressed disappointment with the casting of Rao, suggesting that he appeared miscast in the film. Additionally, it received backlash for marketing its release date in the teaser as "This Independence Day - 14 August" since that date is celebrated as Pakistan's Independence Day. This marketing choice was questioned by netizens regarding its appropriateness for a patriotic film. Filmmaker Ram Gopal Varma was widely condemned for sharing a vulgar and insensitive social media post regarding Advani's bikini appearance in the teaser. The post was later deleted following public outrage. The official trailer was released on 25 July 2025. The film's pre-release event was held on 10 August 2025 in Hyderabad.

== Release ==
=== Theatrical ===
War 2 was released in theatres on 14 August 2025, coinciding with the Indian Independence Day weekend in standard, IMAX, D-Box, ICE, 4DX, EPIQ, Dolby Cinema and other premium formats, with dubbed versions in Telugu and Tamil, clashing with Coolie. It is the first Indian film to be shown and graded in the Dolby Cinema format.

=== Distribution ===
Sithara Entertainments acquired the distribution rights of the film in the Telugu states for ₹90 crore. Think Studios acquired the distribution rights in Tamil Nadu.

=== Home media ===
The film began streaming on Netflix from 9 October 2025 and premiered on Star Gold on 26 January 2026, coinciding with Indian Republic Day.

== Reception ==
=== Box office ===
War 2 grossed ₹82 crore (US$8.8 million) worldwide on its opening day. The film's worldwide gross crossed ₹150 crore (US$16 million) in two days. In its first week, the film's worldwide gross crossed ₹200 crore (US$21 million). In two weeks, the film's worldwide gross reached ₹350 crore (US$37 million). At the end of its theatrical run, the film is estimated to have grossed ₹303 crore (US$32 million)₹351 crore (US$37 million)

=== Critical response ===
War 2 received mixed-to-negative reviews from critics and audiences. On the review aggregator website Rotten Tomatoes, 30% of 23 critics' reviews are positive, with an average rating of 5/10.

Dhaval Roy of The Times of India gave the film 3 out of 5 stars, calling it "strictly watchable, only for the action and spectacle". Kusumika Das from Times Now gave the film 3 out of 5 stars. She praised the performances, action sequences, and dialogues, but noted that the film struggled in the second half due to a slower pace. Vinamra Mathur of Firstpost gave the film 2.5 out of 5 stars and noted that the film had endless conversations and combats that barely served any purpose. Rishabh Suri of Hindustan Times gave the film 2 out of 5 stars, criticising the screenplay and soundtrack, but praising the action sequences. Radhika Sharma of NDTV gave 2 out of 5 stars and wrote "The sequel takes the viewers on a journey to at least 10 countries, stuffing episodes from at least six of them in the post credis". Mayur Sanap of Rediff.com gave 3.5 out of 5 stars, writing "War 2 offers you exactly what you’d expect from a mass entertainer: some escapist fun, truly knockout action scenes, and overall, a good time at the movies". Pranati A S of Deccan Herald gave the film 2 out of 5 stars, criticising the dialogues, story, action sequences, and NTR's casting, calling his character poorly written and lacking depth.

Bollywood Hungama gave the film 2 out of 5 stars, criticizing the screenplay as clichéd and unexciting, the direction as subpar, and the editing as dragging. Nevertheless, the review highlighted the cinematography, action sequences, production design, and costumes as notable strengths. Anuj Kumar of The Hindu criticized the direction, noting that Mukerji loses grip on the narrative while balancing the screen time of Roshan and NTR. Titas Chowdhury of News18 gave the film 2.5 out of 5 stars, praising the action sequences but criticized the plot and poor execution. Rishil Jogani of Pinkvilla gave the film 2.5 out of 5 stars, praising the cinematography, background score, soundtrack, cast performances, production design, and action sequences, but criticised the story and screenplay. Lyca Radio gave 3 out of 5 stars, praising Roshan and NTR's performances, the action sequences, cinematography, and direction, but criticised the screenplay, and pacing of the second half.

Siddhant Adlakha of Variety wrote "The movie’s attempts at crafting classic action homoeroticism fall dispiritingly flat. Roshan and NTR’s brooding intensity and muscular physiques may get audiences through the door, but “War 2” has little to keep them excited or engaged". Shubhra Gupta from The Indian Express gave the film 1.5 out of 5 stars, labelling it "a glossy snooze-fest". Vineeta Kumar from India Today gave the film 2 out of 5 stars, noting the action as unrealistic and excessive. She found the plot confused, oscillating between themes of patriotism, friendship, and weak villains. Additionally, she considered the background music unimpressive and the songs poorly placed.
