= Yomics World =

Indian Comic Book Publishing Company

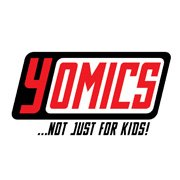
- Founded: 2012
- Founder: Uday Chopra
- Country of origin: India
- Official website: web.archive.org/web/20121225143339/http://www.yomics.in:80/

Yomics World, or 'Yomics' is the comic book division of Yash Raj Films Studios, specializing in creating comic books predominantly based on Yash Raj Films movies and suitable for readers of all ages. These comics are available across the print and digital platforms. It was founded by Uday Chopra in 2012.

== Launch ==
Uday Chopra launched Yomics in July 2012 at YRF Studios in Mumbai.

== List of comics ==
- Ek Tha Tiger: Caught In The Web (2012)
- Ek Tha Tiger: Saving The High Seas (2012)
- Dhoom: Redux 893 (2012)
- Hum Tum: The War Begins! (2012)
- Daya Prochu (2012)
