= Sanchit Balhara and Ankit Balhara =

Indian film score composer

Sanchit Balhara Ankit Balhara
- Occupations: Composer

Sanchit Balhara and Ankit Balhara are an Indian film score composer duo. Sanchit Balhara started his career as a solo composer and became best known for composing the score of Sanjay Leela Bhansali's 2015 film, Bajirao Mastani. Sanchit's elder brother, Ankit Balhara, joined him in 2018, and the duo have been composing together since Manikarnika: The Queen of Jhansi.

== Personal life ==
The brothers born in Sonipat, Haryana, India into a family with a music/film background. Their father Bhal Singh Balhara, is a singer, actor and filmmaker in the Haryanvi film industry. His mother Mukta Chaudhary, is a national level athlete.

Sanchit studied classical music in London. He got his big break as a film score composer with Sanjay Leela Bhansali's Bajirao Mastani. His work in Bajirao Mastani won him awards including IIFA, Music Mirchi, GIMA and Zee cine awards.

The elder brother of the duo, Ankit Balhara, is married to field hockey player, Savita Punia.

== Education ==
Sanchit completed a Music Production & Sound Engineering Diploma at Point Blank Music School in 2011.

== Filmography ==
Year	Film	Language	Notes	Ref.
2012	Tera Mera Vaada	Haryanvi	Composed by Sanchit Balhara	
2015	Bajirao Mastani	Hindi	Composed by Sanchit Balhara	
2018	Padmaavat	Hindi	Composed by Sanchit Balhara	
2018	Loveyatri	Hindi	Composed by Sanchit Balhara	
2019	Manikarnika: The Queen of Jhansi	Hindi		
2019	Kalank	Hindi		
2019	Mamangam	Malayalam		
2019	Malaal	Hindi		
2019	War	Hindi		
2020	Panga	Hindi		
2020	Khaali Peeli	Hindi		
2021	Tuesdays and Fridays	Hindi		
2021	Radhe	Hindi		
2022	Gangubai Kathiawadi	Hindi		
2022	Radhe Shyam	Hindi	Bilingual film Telugu score composed by S. Thaman	
2022	Jayeshbhai Jordaar	Hindi	Also composed "Nanki's Theme" from the soundtrack	
2022	Samrat Prithviraj	Hindi		
2023	Pathaan	Hindi		
2023	Adipurush	Hindi		
2023	The Railway Men	Hindi	Composed "Nindiya" from the soundtrack	
2024	Fighter	Hindi		
2024	Maharaj	Hindi		
2024	Yudhra	Hindi		
2024	Emergency	Hindi		
2025	Mandala Murders	Hindi		
2025	War 2	Hindi	Also composed 4 instrumental tracks for Hindi, Tamil and Telugu versions	
2025	Baaghi 4	Hindi		
2026	Alpha	Hindi		

== Awards and nominations ==
Year	Film	Award	Category	Result	Ref.
2016	Bajirao Mastani	International Indian Film Academy Awards	Best Background Score	Won	
2016	Bajirao Mastani	Global Indian Music Academy Awards	Best Background Score	Won	
2016	Bajirao Mastani	Mirchi Music Awards	Background Score of the Year	Won	
2016	Bajirao Mastani	Zee Cine Awards	Best Background Score	Won	
2019	Padmaavat	Mirchi Music Awards	Background Score of the Year	Won	
