= Gunday (soundtrack) =

Gunday (Original Motion Picture Soundtrack)

Soundtrack album by Sohail Sen
- Released: 10 January 2014
- Recorded: 2013
- Studio: YRF Studios, Mumbai
- Genre: Feature film soundtrack
- Length: 42:33
- Language: Hindi
- Label: YRF Music
- Producer: Sohail Sen

Sohail Sen chronology
Ek Tha Tiger (2012)	Gunday (Original Motion Picture Soundtrack) (2014)	Housefull 3 (2016)
External audio
- Audio Jukebox on YouTube

Gunday (Original Motion Picture Soundtrack) is the soundtrack album to the 2014 film of the same name directed by Ali Abbas Zafar and produced by Yash Raj Films starring Ranveer Singh, Arjun Kapoor and Priyanka Chopra. The soundtrack featured ten songs composed by Sohail Sen with lyrics written by Irshad Kamil, Zafar, Bappi Lahiri and Gautam Susmit. The album was released through YRF Music on 10 January 2014 to positive reviews and became one of the most successful Indian music albums of the year. It received four nominations at the 7th Mirchi Music Awards including Album of The Year.

== Production ==
Sohail Sen associated with Zafar for the second time after Mere Brother Ki Dulhan (2011), where the latter instructed Sen to compose in a contemporary manner, and the tunes should have an earthy feel. Since the film is set during the 1970s and 1980s in Calcutta, Sen used drums, guitars and strings as those instruments were present during that timeline and were the obvious choices to score the film, but kept the Bengali folk soundscape in mind for designing those sounds. Although the songs needed a retro feel, it also had to be relevant to the current period. Sen brought the singers Shadaab Faridi, Altamash Faridi, Shahid Mallya, Neha Bhasin, Neeti Mohan amongst others, during the initial stages so that they could get familiar with the song and live with it before recording. Irshad Kamil was the primary lyricist, writing all the songs, with the exclusion of the title track penned by Zafar himself. He also worked on the Bengali version of the film's music, collaborating with lyricist Sanjay Dasgupta to adapt them in that language.

"Working on the album was a great experience. Creating a mélange of songs is always very challenging, but it is satisfying at the same time as I had to compose songs not only in Hindi, but Bengali as well. It was great fun as we are the same team as in Mere Brother Ki Dhulan, which brought a sense of comfort and flexibility, while working together for the second time."

— Sohail Sen, on composing the Gunday soundtrack, in an interview to Priya Adivarekar of The Indian Express

== Composition ==
"Jashn-E-Ishqa" was the first song he composed for Gunday. After completing the recording session for Ek Tha Tiger (2012) at the YRF Studios, he met Zafar at the office canteen of the studio and discussed about the film's music and this song in particular. While composing the track, he used a number of electric guitars and drum snares playing throughout the song. An extension of the song is "Rhythm of Jashn-E-Ishqa" which featured percussions by classical musician Taufiq Qureshi.

The dance number "Tune Maari Entriyaan" was the toughest to compose, as three lead actors were dancing in that song. Hence, he was challenged to create the song which was easy to sing and to enjoy the madness. Sivamani was brought onboard to perform the drums and percussion. Sen also faced a similar experience while composing "Asalaam-E-Ishqum" as Zafar wanted a cabaret number that sounds contemporary, as a result, Lahiri was brought onboard for the number, where he incorporated his nuances to the song. Lahiri, who also performed "Tune Maari Entriyaan" also wrote lyrics for the Bengali version with Gautam Susmit. The tune for the song "Jiya" was composed eight years ago, but could not be utilized in any film, before choosing it to be included in Gunday. Arijit Singh recorded the song despite being unwell at that time.

"Saiyaan" was another melancholic number which needed contemporary approach, and Sen used a dholak, along with drums and rock guitar, to provide a distinctive approach. "Mann Kunto Maul" is a Sufi number, where Sen, for the first time, had composed a qawwali number, and was instructed to keep it as a traditional qawwali number like Nusrat Fateh Ali Khan's works. Sameer Sen arranged the rhythms for the classical version. The title track featured rap and dubstep version and was performed by Sen himself with Kinga Rhymes.

== Release ==
The soundtrack was released under the YRF Music label on 10 January 2014. The release coincided with a launch event held at YRF Studios in Mumbai, with the presence of Singh, Kapoor, Chopra, Zafar and Sen; for the event, an authentic set resembling the streets of Kolkata in the 1980s had been replicated in the venue. Sen's musical team performed the songs live on stage, and with the soundtrack CD, the video of the song "Tune Maari Entriyaan" being aired in the venue and simultaneously released through YouTube. The music videos for other songs were released afterwards as a part of the film's marketing strategies. A Bengali version of the soundtrack was released on 20 January 2014.

== Reception ==
The album was one of the most successful Indian music albums of 2014, with the songs "Tune Maari Entriyaan", "Jashn-E-Ishaq" and "Asalaam-E-Ishqum" topping various charts in India across various platforms.

The soundtrack album received positive reviews from music critics. Bryan Durham of The Times of India gave a rating of 4 out of 5, writing that the album succeeds in transporting the listener to the period when the film is set, but had its fair share of highs and lows. Rajiv Vijayakar of Bollywood Hungama gave the album a rating of 3.5 out of 5, writing, "Sohail Sen seems to have finally got his act right. His songs have immense popular appeal, substance and the right blend of melody and contemporary styles." Writing for Rediff.com, Joginder Tuteja also gave it 3.5 out of 5 stars, summarizing "Though not all songs are chart-buster material, Gunday offers a lot of variety in its soundtracks". Aditi Chandra, writing for the Indo-Asian News Service published on NDTV gave it 3.5 out of 5, pointing out Sen's versatility as a music composer and writing that the album had "songs for every mood and music lovers couldn't have asked for more." Priya Adivarekar of The Indian Express described it as "a great package which includes a fantastic mix of high on energy and soulful tracks". Karthik Srinivasan of Milliblog described it as a "reasonably competent effort from Sohail".

== Track listing ==
Gunday (Original Motion Picture Soundtrack) – Hindi version track listing
No.	Title	Lyrics	Singer(s)	Length
1.	"Jashn-E-Ishqa"	Irshad Kamil	Javed Ali, Shadaab Faridi	4:21
2.	"Tune Maari Entriyaan"	Irshad Kamil	Bappi Lahiri, KK, Neeti Mohan, Vishal Dadlani	5:13
3.	"Jiya"	Irshad Kamil	Arijit Singh	4:44
4.	"Asalaam-E-Ishqum"	Irshad Kamil	Bappi Lahiri, Neha Bhasin	4:38
5.	"Saaiyaan"	Irshad Kamil	Shahid Mallya	4:17
6.	"Mann Kunto Maula"	Irshad Kamil	Altamash Faridi, Shadaab Faridi	4:45
7.	"Gunday"	Ali Abbas Zafar	Sohail Sen, Kinga Rhymes	2:46
8.	"Rhythm of Jashn-E-Ishqa"	Irshad Kamil	Shadaab Faridi	1:59
9.	"Mann Kunto Maula" (Classical)	Irshad Kamil	Altamash Faridi, Shadaab Faridi	5:11
10.	"Tune Maari Entriyaan" (Bengali version)	Bappi Lahiri, Gautam Susmit	Bappi Lahiri, Monali Thakur	5:13
11.	"Tune Maari Entriyaan" (Remix)	Irshad Kamil	Joshilay, Bappi Lahiri, KK, Neeti Mohan, Vishal Dadlani	3:54
12.	"Gunday Mashup"	Irshad Kamil	Joshilay, Javed Ali, Shadaab Faridi, Bappi Lahiri, KK, Neeti Mohan, Vishal Dadlani, Arijit Singh, Neha Bhasin	5:14
Total length:				52:22

Gunday (Original Motion Picture Soundtrack) – Bengali version track listing
No.	Title	Lyrics	Singer(s)	Length
1.	"Jashn-e-Ishqa"	Sanjay Dasgupta	Krishna Beuraa, Altaf Sayyed	4:21
2.	"Tune Maari Entriyaan"	Bappi Lahiri, Gautam Susmit	Bappi Lahiri, Monali Thakur	5:13
3.	"Jiya"	Sanjay Dasgupta	Arnab Chakraborty	4:44
4.	"Asalaam-E-Ishqum"	Sanjay Dasgupta	Bappi Lahiri, Neha Bhasin	4:38
5.	"Bolo Na"	Sanjay Dasgupta	Shahid Mallya	4:17
6.	"Mann Kunto Maula"	Sanjay Dasgupta	Javed Ali, Shahid Mallya	4:45
7.	"Gunday"	Sanjay Dasgupta	Rajdeep Chatterjee, Victor Dey	2:46
8.	"Rhythm of Jashn-E-Ishqa"	Sanjay Dasgupta	Shadaab Faridi	1:59
9.	"Mann Kunto Maula" (Classical)	Sanjay Dasgupta	Javed Ali, Shahid Mallya	5:11
Total length:				37:59

== Accolades ==
Accolades for Gunday (Original Motion Picture Soundtrack)
Award	Category	Recipients	Result	Ref.
Mirchi Music Awards	Album of The Year	Gunday	Nominated	
Mirchi Music Awards	Programmer & Arranger of the Year	Sohail Sen (for song "Tune Maari Entriyaan")	Nominated	
Mirchi Music Awards	Song Engineering of the Year	Vijay Dayal, Dipesh Sharma (for song "Tune Maari Entriyaan")	Nominated	
Mirchi Music Awards	Upcoming Male Vocalist of The Year	Shadab Faridi (for song "Jashn-E-Ishqa")	Nominated	
Stardust Awards	Best Lyricist	Irshad Kamil (for song "Tune Maari Entriyaan")	Nominated	
Stardust Awards	Best Lyricist	Irshad Kamil (for song "Asalaam-e-Ishqum")	Nominated	
Stardust Awards	Best Playback Singer – Male	Vishal Dadlani, K. K. (for song "Tune Maari Entriyaan")	Nominated	
Stardust Awards	Best Playback Singer – Female	Neha Bhasin (for song "Asalaam-e-Ishqum")	Nominated	
