= Ek Tha Tiger (soundtrack) =

- Soundtrack album cover

Soundtrack album by Sohail Sen and Sajid–Wajid
- Released: 27 June 2012
- Recorded: 2011–2012
- Studio: YRF Studios
- Genres: Filmi; soundtrack
- Length: 31:27
- Label: YRF Music
- Producers: Sohail Sen (also exec.); Sajid–Wajid; Joshilay; Julius Packiam

Sohail Sen chronology
From Sydney with Love (2012)	Ek Tha Tiger (2012)	Gunday (2014)

Sajid–Wajid chronology
Teri Meri Kahaani (2012)	Ek Tha Tiger (2012)	Kamaal Dhamaal Malamaal (2012)

Singles from Ek Tha Tiger
- 1. "Mashallah" Released: 13 June 2012

Ek Tha Tiger is the soundtrack to the 2012 film of the same name directed by Kabir Khan and starred Salman Khan. The film's soundtrack featured four songs composed by Sohail Sen and the film's theme song "Mashallah" (featured in the end credits) composed by the duo Sajid–Wajid as guest musician. It also featured three remixes of its songs produced by Joshilay. The lyrics for the songs were written by Neelesh Misra, Anvita Dutt and Kausar Munir. The soundtrack was released by YRF Music on 27 June 2012 to positive reviews and preceded with "Mashallah" as the lead single on 13 June 2012.

== Background ==
A. R. Rahman was initially approached to score music for the film but he left the project due to schedule conflicts. Later Pritam was roped in to compose the music, and was credited for the music on the film's first digital poster. However, he dropped out following scheduling conflicts with Dhoom 3 (2013). Sohail Sen replaced Pritam as the composer. Sen had previously scored Mere Brother Ki Dulhan for Yash Raj Films, and upon Aditya Chopra's insistence, he was brought in to score the film. Julius Packiam composed the film's background score, who had been frequently collaborated with Khan Kabul Express (2006) and New York (2009).

Recording for the soundtrack began in 2011–2012. Sen and Kabir had several discussions regarding the film's music where the latter instructed him on the songs should have a feel of the place where they have been shot. He influenced Middle Eastern and Irish instrumentation and soundscapes in the song "Mashallah" and Latin American sounds in "Laapata". For the latter, Sen went to Cuba for recording the instrumentation and chorus to have an authentic touch.

In late-2011, the song "Jaaniyan", which was recorded by Pakistani singer Bilawal Baloch was leaked, and reported to be included on the soundtrack. Yash Raj Films denied the song was to be on the soundtrack and increased security measures to prevent leaks.

== Track listing ==
No.	Title	Lyrics	Music	Singer(s)	Length
1.	"Mashallah"	Kausar Munir	Sajid–Wajid	Wajid and Shreya Ghoshal	4:43
2.	"Laapata"	Anvita Dutt	Sohail Sen	Palak Muchhal and K. K.	4:16
3.	"Banjaara"	Neelesh Misra	Sohail Sen	Sukhwinder Singh	4:35
4.	"Saiyaara"	Kausar Munir	Sohail Sen	Mohit Chauhan and Tarannum Mallik	4:13
5.	"Tiger's Theme"	–	Julius Packiam	Instrumental	3:17
6.	"Mashallah" (Remix)	Kausar Munir	Sajid–Wajid	Wajid and Shreya Ghoshal	3:24
7.	"Lapaata" (Remix)	Anvita Dutt	Sohail Sen	K. K. and Palak Muchhal	3:30
8.	"Banjaara" (Remix)	Neelesh Misra	Sohail Sen	Sukhwinder Singh	3:27
Total length:					31:27

== Reception ==
The soundtrack received positive reviews. Indo-Asian News Service posting on CNN-IBN also rated the album a 4 out of 5, noting it "offers the listener the romantic and action of the [film], with an entertaining array of sounds". Purva Desai of The Times of India and Devesh Sharma of Filmfare also gave the soundtrack a 4 out of 5, noting it as an improvement over the soundtracks of Salman Khan and Kabir Khan's previous films. They also praised the composers for their contemporary focus.

Joginder Tuteja of Bollywood Hungama gave the album 3.5/5 and wrote "[it] is good, though one expected it to have gone all the way. [Nothing] puts you off, but the overall sound of the album remains more or less consistent". In contrast, Vipin Nair of Music Aloud described it as a "middling score" and rated 5.5 out of 10. Karthik Srinivasan of Milliblog criticised the soundtrack saying "this is not a tiger – only a cat".

== Chart performance ==
The film's theme song, "Mashallah" topped several music charts throughout August and continued ten weeks till the end of its theatrical run. The song won the People's Choice Awards for Favourite Song of 2012.

== Legacy ==
The song "Saiyaara", composed by Sen and written by Munir, later inspired the title of a 2025 romantic drama produced by Yash Raj Films, which went on to become one of the most successful films of the year.
