= Khauff (disambiguation) =

Khauf or Khauff (lit. 'Fear') may refer to:

- Khauff, an Indian Hindi-language action thriller film
- Khauff Begins... Ringa Ringa Roses, an Indian action horror thriller television show
- Khauf, an Indian horror television series

== See also ==
- Khamoshh... Khauff Ki Raat, an Indian Hindi-language mystery thriller film
