= Rishab =

Rishab may refer to:

- Rishab Chadha (born 1994), Indian actor
- Rishab Shetty (born 1983), Indian film director
- Rishabhanatha, Jain deity
