= Rameshwar S. Bhagat =

Indian film editor

- Occupation: Film editor
- Years active: 2004–present

Rameshwar S. Bhagat is an Indian film editor who works in Hindi films. He has edited several films for Yash Raj Films such as Dhoom (2004), Dhoom 2 (2006), New York (2009), Ek Tha Tiger (2012), Sultan (2016), Tiger Zinda Hai (2017), and Tiger 3 (2023).

== Filmography ==
Year	Film	Notes
2004	Dhoom	Won – Filmfare Award for Best Editing
2006	Fight Club: Members Only	
2006	Dhoom 2	
2007	Ta Ra Rum Pum	
2007	Heyy Babyy	
2008	My Name is Anthony Gonsalves	
2008	Tashan	
2008	De Taali	
2008	Kidnap	
2009	New York	
2009	Unnaipol Oruvan	Bilingual film
2009	Eenadu	Bilingual film
2010	Housefull	
2010	Anjaana Anjaani	
2011	Love Breakups Zindagi	
2011	Tell Me O Kkhuda	
2011	Miley Naa Miley Hum	
2012	Housefull 2	
2012	Ek Tha Tiger	
2013	Ishkq in Paris	
2013	Maazii	
2013	Boss	
2014	Gunday	
2014	Dishkiyaoon	
2014	Kick	
2014	The Shaukeens	
2015	Bajrangi Bhaijaan	
2016	Sultan	
2016	Ventilator	National Film Award for Best Editing
2017	Phillauri	
2017	Tubelight	
2017	Tiger Zinda Hai	
2018	Baaghi 2	
2018	Parmanu: The Story of Pokhran	
2019	Manikarnika: The Queen of Jhansi	
2019	Bharat	
2019	Kolaiyuthir Kaalam	Tamil-language film
2019	Housefull 4	
2020	The Forgotten Army - Azaadi Ke Liye	
2020	Baaghi 3	
2020	Bulbbul	
2020	Suraj Pe Mangal Bhari	
2022	Heropanti 2	
2022	Dhaakad	
2022	Ram Setu	
2023	Tiger 3	
2025	Emergency	
2025	Badass Ravi Kumar	
2025	Housefull 5	
2025	120 Bahadur	

== Awards ==
- National Film Award for Best Editing - Ventilator
- Filmfare Award for Best Editing - Dhoom
