= Karan Aanand =

Indian Actor and Producer

- Born: Prayagraj, Uttar Pradesh, India
- Education: Allahabad University
- Occupations: Actor, Producer
- Years active: 2009–present
- Known for: Gunday, Baby, Lupt

Karan Aanand is an Indian actor and producer who is known for his work in Hindi films. He made his on-screen debut in 2014 with Ali Abbas Zafar's Gunday. Aanand was praised for his performances in the films Kick (2014), Baby (2015) and Lupt (2018).

== Early life ==
Aanand was born in Prayagraj, Uttar Pradesh, India. He completed his schooling at KP Inter College and completed his graduation from Allahabad University. He holds a black belt in Hapkido.

== Career ==
After moving to Mumbai, Aanand joined the theatre group Ekjut. In the year 2009, he debuted on the small screen with the TV serial Chittod Ki Rani Padmini Ka Johur and worked there for a long time. In 2011, he played a supporting role in a Bengali film, Ami Shubhash Bolchi. During this time, he produced the Doordarshan serial Kabhi To Mil Ke Sab Bolo and was also the lead actor in it. In 2014, he made his debut in Hindi cinema with the film Gunday, and after that, he played the role of Anil Sharma in Sajid Nadiadwala's film Kick in the same year.

In the year 2015, he gained recognition in the film industry with his role of Jamal in Neeraj Pandey's Baby, and in the same year, he appeared in Madhur Bhandarkar's Calendar Girls. Additionally, a serial, Ek Lakshya, based on the attraction of women towards the army, was produced on Doordarshan.

== Filmography ==
Year	Title	Role	Notes	Ref
2009	Chittod Ki Rani Padmini Ka Johur	Unknown		
2011	Ami Shubhash Bolchi	Karan		
2012	Kabhi To Mil Ke Sab Bolo	Karan/Vijay		
2014	Gunday	Dutta		
2014	Kick	Anil Sharma		
2015	Baby	Jamal/Spy		
2015	Calendar Girls	Palash Bose		
2015	Ek lakshya			
2018	Lupt	Rahul Saxena		
2018	Thugs of Hindostan	Rebel		
2019	Rangeela Raja	Yuvraj/IAS Officer		
2020	Aaina	Himself		
2021	It's Over	Director		
2021	Color Black	Basit		
2023	OMG 2	Praful Maheshwari		
2023	Jaaiye Aap Kahan Jaayenge	Kishan		
