= Dhoondh Legi Manzil Humein =

- Genre: Drama
- Written by: Monish Sekhri; Varun Gautam; Anand Vardhan; Jyoti Tondon
- Creative directors: Nitinkumar, Karishmaa Oluchi
- Starring: See below
- Country of origin: India
- Original language: Hindi
- No. of seasons: 1
- No. of episodes: 261

Production
- Running time: 22 minutes

Original release
- Network: STAR One
- Release: 22 November 2010 – 14 October 2011

Dhoondh Legi Manzil Humein (transl. Destiny will find us) is an Indian television series on STAR One that premiered on 22 November 2010 and ended on 14 October 2011. It is a love story set against a political backdrop. The show is loosely based on the story of the Marathi film Gharabaher from Marathi director Sanjay Surkar, who is the producer of the show.

== Plot ==
The story is about 23-year-old Alka, who is very spunky, bright and witty, living in New York. She is very cosmopolitan and independent and has a little fuzzy worldview, essentially due to the privileged life she has led. She is studying architecture and plans to settle in New York City permanently, but Alka's life takes a complete U-turn when she returns to India to her father's house after completing her studies. Her father is a shining political figure who now wants his son to take on the political legacy forward.

Alka has no interest in politics but life chalks out another plan for her. Initially Alka has an affair with an American guy, Ralph. When Alka reveals her relationship with Ralph to her family though her mother and brother support the relationship her father, Nityanand Tiwari (NNT) is completely against it. Alka's father tells her that her marriage with that American guy is never possible. But the problem get solved during Ralph's visit to India when Alka and Ralph realize that they are a complete mismatch as life partners. Eventually Alka falls in love with her childhood friend Chander, who is part of her father's political party and valiantly fights for the rights of the downtrodden. Chander's honesty attracts Alka a lot. Being with Chander, Alka starts to realize the real meaning of love. But NNT had a different plane for Alka. He wants Alka to get married with the renowned industrialist Jay Vardhan, who with the help of NNT's political connection wants to open a fertilizer plant in Kishanganj shortly.

Alka's brother Abhishek get involved with a young woman named Nandini who is from a middle-class family. NNT does not accept the relationship between Abhishek and Nandini. NNT wants his son to marry someone whose family can finance Abhishek's political career. So NNT wants Abhishek to marry the princess of Kushalgarh Province, Gauri. After Abhishek-Nandini's relationship become public Nandini's father Dubbey Ji goes to NNT to talk about the couple's marriage. NNT accepts Dubbey Ji's proposal and assures him that he will announce about the marriage soon. In the day of NNT's marriage anniversary function in front of all guests and journalists instead of Nandini's name NNT announces Gauri's name as the bride of Abhishek in presence of Nandini and her Father. After being humiliated Mr. Dubbey fixes Nandini's marriage with Gopal, who is the son of his friend. Abhishek and Chander goes to Gopal to tell him not to marry Nandini. An angry Abhishek hurt Gopal in the middle of the road. Returning home NNT tells them that Gopal is dead. Nandini's father Mr. Dubey lodged a complaint at the police station against Abhishek as the culprit of Gopal's murder. But on NNT's instruction, the police officer writes Chander's name everywhere in the complaint instead of Abhishek. After this incident Nandini and her father leaves the city. On the other hand Alka feels that Chander has no future in her father's Indians People Party (IPP). In IPP, Chander is always exploited so she takes him to the opposition: RJM (Rastrya Janta Morcha). The leader of RJM is young lady, Aarti.

After Nandini left, Abhishek agrees to marry Gauri. The marriage takes place, but there is no husband-wife relationship between the two. On the day of Rasui puja the relationship between Alka and Chander get revealed to the Tiwari family, neither NNT nor Abhishek supports their relationship. NNT tells Chander never to dare to keep any relationship with Alka.

Abhishek tries to make him busy in politics. But just before the election, a circular come which states on the basis of the Women's Reservation Bill the seat of Kishanganj constituency get reserved for women. A frustrated Abhishek get lost in the world of alcohol and nightlife. This news also breaks NNT's dream too and being unable to withstand the shocking news he get a heart attack. Though Alka was not at all interested in politics but for the shake of her family and Chander's sheer persuasion insists Alka to take a decision that she will contest the Vidhan Sabha Election from Kishanganj for IPP. Alka get elected as MLA of Kishanganj, defeating her nearest contestant Aarti. But she became a puppet of her father and brother.

Meanwhile Chander was opposing reopening of a fertilizer plant as it lacked safety measures. Alka' s brother and industrialist Jay Vardhan gets Chander killed. Alka loses perspective and interest in life — heartbroken she is all set to return to New York. Much to the relief of her family, she is told to stay back when her father's constituency gets reserved for women candidates. Alka's father's clout helps her win the election but she still does not have any interest in the role she is made to take up until there is a gas leak in the fertilizer factory Chander had been opposing, leaving many dead. A very conscientious Alka wakes up to the call of her life, realizing that only she can make the social change happen, which Chander wanted, much to the discomfort of her father, who had gotten her elected but never wanted her get empowered in the true sense. In due course Alka realizes the foul play in Chander's death; she takes a vow to avenge his death and bring the culprits to the book of law. She is shocked when she sees that the culprit is none other than her own brother.

It's Alka's life-altering moment which changes the course of her journey and brings her closer to the real call in life. In the end before Alka and Jay's marriage she finds out that Chander is alive. Finally they are Reunited and the show ends on a happy note.

== Cast ==
Main cast
Actor	Role
Sara Khan	Alka Tiwari
Aarun Nagar	Arun
Yashwant Singh Thakur	Chander Shukla
Deepak Wadhwa	Abhishek Tiwari
Vikas Verma/Alexx O'Nell	Ralph
Deepali Pansare	Nandini
Mohan Joshi (Anil Maggo^{†})	Nityanand Tiwari (Alka's father)
Neelima Parandekar	Savitri Tiwari (Alka's mother)
Neetha Shetty	Aarti
Khalid Siddiqui	Jayvardhan
Sheetal Dabholkar	Gauri
