= Tara From Satara =

Indian television series

- Genre: Family; Drama
- Created by: Saeed Akhtar, Aisha Faizan
- Starring: See below
- Composer: Raagini Kavathekar
- Country of origin: India
- Original language: Hindi
- No. of seasons: 1
- No. of episodes: 110

Production
- Producers: Ranjeet Thakur; Hemant Ruprell
- Production locations: Mumbai, Maharashtra, India
- Camera setup: Multi-camera
- Running time: 20 minutes
- Production companies: Frames Production; IdeaRack Private Limited

Original release
- Network: Sony Entertainment Television
- Release: 19 August 2019 – 7 February 2020

Tara From Satara is an Indian family drama television series. that premiered on 19 August 2019 on Sony TV. Produced by Ranjeet Thakur and Hemant Ruprell, it stars Roshni Walia.

== Plot ==
Tara from Satara revolves around the story of two sisters from Satara - Tara Mane and her elder sister Radhika Mane. The two sisters love to dance and are very fond of it, too, the only difference being - Radhika does classical Kathak dance whereas Tara likes to do Bollywood moves.

Radhika learns Kathak from her father Sachin Mane, a well trained classical dancer, who at present dislikes Bollywood dance, but in his past, he was part of the Bollywood Showbiz. He went to fulfill his dream in Mumbai but was unable to do so. This regret in him made him dislike Bollywood and totally against people who dances on Bollywood numbers or listen to Bollywood music in his home or his neighbourhood.

Tara, who is very fond of Bollywood music and fan of MK (a Bollywood artist), is not good in studies and is seen dancing to Bollywood music, which irks her father. Her failing grades makes Tara doubt herself and in this process tries to quit dancing for the sake of studies, but in vain. Tara is only supported by her Aaji, her paternal grandmother, who has full faith in her granddaughter and thinks that one day Tara will shine like a star and be the pride of her father, much unlike her present situation.

Tara gets selected in a local audition in a Dance Reality show called "Dancer No. 1". She gets selected for a large audition in Mumbai and awarded a pass (yellow card) but since it involves Bollywood and showbiz, her father is angered, so she hides the fact that she was the one selected. Her elder sister Radhika takes the blame and the yellow card. But as Radhika was a responsible child of her father, he consoles himself although he rejects the yellow card and throws it away (but Tara finds it and preserves it).

One day, in a local competition, the footfall of Radhika and her team dips, while it aggressively increases for a team owned by Rægo, a dance trainer who practices Bollywood. This insult, along with the increasing poverty, the fear of getting his dance academy closed, makes Sachin Mane change his decision and send his daughter to Dancer No. 1, although he orders her daughter Radhika to strictly perform Kathak and other Indian classical dance forms and stay away from Bollywood and showbiz.

Tara and her entire family except her parents accompany Radhika to Mumbai, where they meet Arjun, a dancer and part-time mechanic who is also a participant. Arjun is seen helping Tara and her family in various occasions. As the show progresses, luck tries to take Tara towards the stage yet she fails to capitalise. She is appointed as an intern in Dancer No. 1 and she takes care of the normal stuffs regarding the participants of the show. Many twists and turns take her close to her dreams of becoming a dancer and dancing on the big stage. In one episode Radhika insists to do a Bollywood dance after her Kathak dance gets less views than Gurpreet's Bollywood dance. On the day of her dance, Sachin, her father, brings anklets, expecting she will do a Kathak dance. When Radhika sees Sachin while dancing, she freezes on stage and therefore gets eliminated. Tara, Bedane, and Aiji stay as Tara auditions for the wild card entry. Tara wins the wild card entry while Radhika has a feud with her family and leaves for Mumbai for a heroine entry. The theme of the dance is decades. Tara spy on Rahul to get the news of Radhika. Rahul loses his temper and hurts Tara and Arjun slaps Rahul for being a jerk to Tara. Paddy sir comes and shows his true colors to Arjun and others. Bedane records it and Paddy sir is fired. Radhika fills in for Paddy sir and tries to get Tara out.

Later on, Tara wins the Dancer No. 1 competition and reveals that the famous Manmane dance step was choreographed by her father Sachin and not Shatru. Then Srilekha also supports Tara's statement and thus Sachin regains his lost glory. Tara exposed Shatru and gave 50% of her prize money to Arjun since her only motive was to regain her father's pride and earlier Arjun had intentionally lost semi-finals so that Tara can win the competition.

== Cast ==
=== Main ===
- Roshni Walia as Tara Mane – An aspiring dancer; Sachin and Sarita's younger daughter; Radhika's sister
- Sheezan Khan as Arjun Priya - Tara’s friend; Dancer Number One’s Contestant

=== Recurring ===
- Urvashi Pardeshi as Radhika Mane – An aspiring dancer; Sachin and Sarita's elder daughter; Tara's sister
- Upendra Limaye as Sachin Mane – Ajji's elder son; Varun's brother; Sarita's husband; Tara and Radhika's father
- Eijaz Khan as Shartughan (Shatru) Mehra – One of the main judges in Dancer No 1
- Sudha Chandran as Srilekha – One of the three main judges in Dancer No 1
- Anant V Joshi as MK – One of the three main judges in Dancer No 1
- Yuvraj Malhotra as R.T Sir – the Producer-Director of Dancer No 1 in special Role
- Arjun Singh Shekhawat as Ankit – Head of backstage operation in the show
- Ashwini Koul as Rahul Ahuja – Dancer No 1 Contest
- Shazil Khan as Amukh Bhedane – Tara's best friend
- Sonu Pathak as Rival dance master of Sachin Mane in Satara
- Eva Shirali as Sarita Mane – Sachin's wife; Tara and Radhika's mother
- Amita Khopkar as Ajji – Sachin and Varun's mother; Tara, Radhika and Rohan's grandmother
- Ashish Gokhale as Varun Mane – Ajji's younger son; Sachin's brother; Chinu's husband; Rohan's father
- Saii Ranade Sane as Chinu Mane – Varun's wife; Rohan's mother
- Wahib Kapadia as Rohan Mane – Varun and Chinu's son; Tara and Radhika's cousin
- Bhavya Sachdeva as Abhay – Radhika's boyfriend in Satara
- Agustya Chandra as Alen
- Khushboo Purohit as Gurpreet
- Aman Gandhi as Samar – Gurpreet's boyfriend
- Vishal Rai as Venky
