= Aseem Mishra =

Indian cinematographer

Aseem Mishra/ Azeem Mishra
- Born: Dhanbad, Bihar, (present-day Jharkhand), India
- Education: Jamia Millia Islamia
- Occupation: Cinematographer
- Writing career
- Years active: 1993 – present

Aseem Mishra is Indian cinematographer who has worked in Bollywood films. A few of his films are New York (2009), Ek Tha Tiger (2012), Dabangg 2(2012), Bajrangi Bhaijaan (2015), Phantom (2015), Dream Girl (2019) etc.

He studied cinematography in MCRC, Jamia Millia Islamia. He shot most of Kabir Khan's films, except for Kabul Express.

== Filmography ==
Year	Film	Language	Notes
2008	Contract	Hindi	
2009	New York	Hindi	
2010	Once Upon a Time in Mumbaai	Hindi	
2010	Band Baaja Baaraat	Hindi	
2011	Saheb, Biwi Aur Gangster	Hindi	
2011	Ladies vs Ricky Bahl	Hindi	
2012	Paan Singh Tomar	Hindi	
2012	Ek Tha Tiger	Hindi	
2012	Dabangg 2	Hindi	
2014	Gunday	Hindi	
2015	Bajrangi Bhaijaan	Hindi	
2015	Phantom	Hindi	
2017	Tubelight	Hindi	
2018	Parmanu: The Story Of Pokhran	Hindi	
2019	Dream Girl	Hindi	
2020	The Forgotten Army - Azaadi Ke Liye	Hindi	Television series on Amazon Prime Video
2021	83	Hindi	
2022	Escaype Live	Hindi	Television series on Disney+Hotstar
2022	Ram Setu	Hindi	
2023	Mission Raniganj	Hindi	
2024	Vicky Vidya Ka Woh Wala Video	Hindi	
