= Lupt =

2018 film directed by Prabhuraj

- Directed by: Prabhuraj
- Written by: Prabhuraj
- Produced by: Lalit Kiri
- Starring: Javed Jaffrey; Vijay Raaz; Niki Aneja Walia; Meenakshi Dixit; Karan Anand
- Cinematography: Prakash Kutty
- Music by: Vicky-Hardik
- Production company: T-Series
- Release date: 2 November 2018
- Running time: 110 minutes
- Country: India
- Language: Hindi
- Budget: ₹3.50 crore
- Box office: ₹1.57 crore

Lupt (transl. Extinct; Hindi pronunciation: [lʊpt]) is a 2018 Indian Hindi-language supernatural horror film starring Javed Jaffrey, Niki Aneja Walia and Vijay Raaz. The film is directed by Prabhuraj. The story revolves around Harsh Tandon, a ruthless businessman and his family, and how they go on dying one after another by a supernatural force during a family vacation due to a past sin committed by Harsh. The film is a remake of the 2003 English-language french film Dead End.

== Plot ==
Harsh Tandon, a workaholic businessman, announces to his subordinates about the new merger his company made. His daughter, Tanu is a model dating a photographer, Rahul Saxena. She returns home from work to the lights flickering suddenly, and a weird voice coming from her brother Sam's room. She finds a skull in his closet and an ominous figure scares her. Tanu calls for her mother, Shalini and the figure is revealed to be Sam. Sam, in disappointment, announced that he is going to run away to America because no one appreciates his jokes. The next day, Shalini asks Harsh if they can go on a family road trip but Harsh rejects her request, saying he has to focus on his business.

On his way to work, Harsh sees a young girl crossing the road, in which he quickly stops the car only to see no one. In shock, he requests his chauffeur to drive him somewhere else instead of his office. Harsh goes to visit and consult a psychiatrist who suggests that he is suffering from hallucinations and that he should take a break from work. Meanwhile, on a date, Rahul inquires Tanu about her father's distant behaviour. At his office, Harsh hallucinates a spectral figure staring at him.

After consulting his psychiatrist, he decides to go on a vacation with his family. Some moments later, he gets the news that his manager had recently died on-site from an accident. He gives his subordinate Tyagi all the responsibilities and has a small talk with a man named Satish. While the Tandon family at home prepare for their vacation, Tanu convinces Rahul to come with them. They stop at a petrol station along the way. Tanu goes to buy snacks at the station's convenience store, and upon returning, she bumps into a mysterious man dressed all in black. The silence in the car is boring Sam; in an attempt to liven up his family and Rahul, Sam tells a joke, but nobody laughed. After fuelling the car, the road gets blocked as due to an accident that occurred there. Harsh decides to take another route, which its longer than the original route but without signs or lights. The Tandons spot a man on the road, who is the same man Tanu bumped into at the petrol station. He asks the family their destination, but they don't respond, while Sam jokes about having a corpse in the car.

Later, the family see a stroller carrying a doll on the road. Sam tries to scare everyone by acting childishly, in the hopes of fooling them that the doll is possessed and has attacked him. His prank proved to be futile as Sam didn't accomplish scaring anybody, but only to get slapped by his angry father. Everyone returns to the car, and so does Sam. Harsh asks him to remove the stroller from the road. After removing the stroller, Sam is shocked to see it reappear on the road. He throws it away this time, only for the stroller to push itself back onto the road. A while later, Harsh hallucinates a ghost, and the car begins to break down. Sam is alone in the car when the radio starts playing static noise saying that "everyone will die," despite that there is no signal in that area. A car stops near them, which is the very same man they came across a while back. The man introducing himself as Dev Shukla tells the family that there is no garage nearby, but he offers them to stay at his cottage for the night. After some consideration, the family agrees to go. Upon their arrival to the cottage, the family spots a swing that's swaying by itself, Dev suggests that it might be the wind. After unpacking the car, the family enter the cottage.

Dev asks for their destination which Harsh says is Nainital. Dev adds that there is no help here. Tanu tells her mother that she is uncomfortable there. Meanwhile, Sam is alone and sees a doll's foot. He gets closer, and realizes the doll is almost identical the one he saw on the road. He then hears a child's giggle going behind him and looks back to see that the doll is now crying blood. Tanu comes, and the doll disappears. Outside Sam sees a young girl holding the doll, but again when Tanu turns to see, the girl and the doll vanish. Tanu tells Rahul about how she is bored of Sam's pranks and childish antics. In his frustration and boredom, Sam takes a knife and starts piercing it through the wall. As a result of his son's obnoxious and destructive behaviour, Harsh angrily says that he is disowning Sam. Sam's voice begins to change, ominously saying, "Everyone will die". Now, Sam is outside, and he suddenly feels a sensation on the swing. Dev goes to talk to Sam, in which Sam goes on the road after him. Rahul goes outside to talk to him, and Sam says he is doing nothing. Sam tells everything he saw to Rahul and begs to return. However, Rahul does not take him seriously, Sam is all alone.

At the cottage, Harsh sees a woman in red clothes, and when he looks again, the figure disappears. Tanu informs her parents and Rahul that the car has been fixed. Harsh is now alone in the cottage. The lights then begin to flicker violently, and when the power goes out, Harsh goes to find his family. He hears noises which include a girl laughing. After a long search, he finally sees the ghost, the lights come back on and Tanu checks on him. In that specific room, they see some disturbing pictures. In fear, Harsh wants to leave. Meanwhile, as Sam walks on the road, he suddenly spots the same stroller from earlier. He follows it, and then witnesses the ghost girl singing "Happy Birthday to Riya" with the doll. Sam has an eye-to-eye moment with the girl, and then turns around to get jump-scared by the same woman that Harsh saw. Sam runs for his life until he reaches the cottage, gravely injured and white from the shock. When Sam begins to have a violent nosebleed, Harsh calls for an ambulance, only to hear a woman crying on the receiving end. Tanu begins to experience difficulty breathing for reasons unknown, and Rahul is asked to go get an inhaler. In his state of shock, Sam says "the girl" before seeing the ghostly woman again and dying as a result.

The family suspects that Dev killed Sam as he is the only one missing. Rahul and Harsh put Sam's lifeless body in the trunk, and continued their trip. Shalini asks for Sam's whereabouts, but Harsh refuses to answer for a moment. Harsh stops the car as Tanu is having her breathing problems again. Shalini is outside too, but now with a gun and demanding for Sam. Shalini sees Sam and follows him and the rest follow Shalini but lose her. Shalini runs behind Sam and goes straight towards a tree, thus losing consciousness. Tanu finds her first.

The three, Harsh, Rahul, and Tanu continue the trip. Shalini is put next to Tanu. Harsh sees a ghostly figure between them. Shalini hears Sam calling for her and regains consciousness. She continues to hear Sam and some smacking in the trunk. She asks Harsh to stop the car, while threatening him with death if he refuses to do so. Shalini then jumps out of the car and says "you will all die," before dying herself. Shalini also saw the same ghost before dying just as her son did.

Now the remaining three members (Harsh, Tanu, and Rahul) continue on the road. Harsh sees signs of Lucknow on the road and asks Rahul to take the car a little back. He is surprised that Lucknow is still 145 miles away despite driving for hours, and that he also sees the board of Dev's cottage. Harsh thinks a lot about what happened and tells Rahul to drive back to the cottage. There, Harsh finds Dev and confronts him about his identity. Dev explains that he is a writer, and the family left their baggage at his home, before asking Harsh the whereabouts of Shalini and Sam. Harsh responds that his wife and son are both deceased. Dev mentions that there was an accident on that road that killed a family of three, and thus confirms all connections regarding the stroller, the little girl, and the doll. Harsh, in guilt, holds himself responsible for the death of his wife and son.

Harsh then tells Dev the whole story of what occurred two years prior to the current events and supernatural encounters that lead to the tragic deaths of his wife and son. His biggest competitor was another businessman by the name of Vinod Kumar. One evening, Vinod attended the same company party as Harsh. Harsh was talking with Satish, the same man he had a small heated talk with earlier in the film, expressing how envious he was of Vinod winning the Entrepreneur of The Year award and title. At the party, Harsh meets Vinod's family, his wife Geeta dressed in red, and his young daughter Riya with her doll, who invites him to her birthday party. As Vinod and his family left the party to return home, Satish warns Harsh about driving home under the influence of alcohol. Ignoring Satish's concern, the drunk Harsh speeds his car and hits Vinod's car, causing the vehicle to crash into the Lucknow sign. The Kumar family are gravely injured, but slightly alive. Satish begs Harsh to help Vinod and his family, but he makes no effort to save them, and abandons them for death.

Harsh begins to feel guilty and regretful upon the revelation of his actions. There is flickering in the house. He sees the little girl. Dev denies the existence of the spirits. Tanu starts having her breathing problems again but now the inhaler has finished. There is another flickering and a storm. She sees the woman, revealed to be Vinod's wife, Geeta, which everyone sees. Harsh pleads to Geeta's spirit for his daughter's life. He takes his own life with a gun. Geeta spares Tanu's life as her little girl looks at her in such a way.

The movie ends with Dev saying that this new experience changed his beliefs about the existence of spirits and a new book that he wrote was titled "Lupt".

== Cast ==
- Javed Jaffrey as Harsh Tandon
- Vijay Raaz as Dev Shukla
- Niki Aneja Walia as Shalini Tandon
- Meenakshi Dixit as Tanu Tandon
- Rishab Chadha as Sam Tandon
- Rishina Kandhari as Geeta Kumar
- Kasturi Banerjee as Vidya
- Karan Aanand as Rahul Saxena
- Rayees Mohiuddin as Satish
- Kiearra soni as Riya Kumar
- Rajeev Bhardwaj as Vinod Kumar
- Nataša Stanković (Item number song "Bhoot Hu Main")

== Soundtrack ==
No.	Title	Lyrics	Music	Singer	Length
1.	"Bhoot Hoon Main"	Hardik Acharya	Vicky & Hardik	Sunidhi Chauhan	3.14
2.	"Lupt- Title Track"	Sushant Sudhakaran	Siddharth Parashar,	Aishwarya Nigam	2.00

== Release and Reception ==
The Mumbai Mirror gave the film a resoundingly negative review, noting the overuse of cliches and horror film tropes. The Economic Times wrote a review that "despite a decent script, the story starts to spiral downwards in a few minutes." Times Of India gave it a rating of two stars out of five. Shubhra Gupta of The Indian Express gave the film one star out of five, calling it "plain horrible."
