= Rishab Chadha =

Indian actor (born 1994)

- Born: 20 June 1994 (age 32); Mumbai, Maharashtra
- Occupation: Actor
- Years active: 2007-present

Rishab Chadha is an Indian actor who mainly appears in Hindi films, shows on Indian television, and web series. He is best known for his roles in Drishyam, Khoobsurat, Lupt and Aadat Se Majboor.

== Early life and education ==
Chadha was born on 20 June 1994 in Mumbai, Maharashtra. He completed his schooling from Gopal Sharma Memorial School and graduated from R. D. National College, Bandra with a degree in BMM.

== Acting career ==
Chadha started his acting career at a very young age with Zee TV serial Aladdin in 2007 and there was no looking back for him. He gained popularity as a teenage artist in television and appeared in many children shows. He was a part of Disney's Best of Luck Nikki (2011) and The Suite Life of Karan & Kabir (2012). He has also acted in the series Khauff Begins... Ringa Ringa Roses (2013) on Life OK and in Kota Toppers (2015–16) on UTV Bindass. He was last seen on television in SAB TV show Aadat Se Majboor (2017). Besides working in television, Rishab Chadha regularly appears in web series. He started his web series career in 2016 with Shaadi Boys on Voot. He has recently worked in Boys with Toys (2019) for Hungama App and Bhootpurva (2019) on ZEE5. Rishab Chadha has made his Bollywood debut in 2014 with Khoobsurat. He was seen in 2015 release Drishyam.

After making his acting debut at the age of 13 Chadha went on work in many television commercials. He has appeared in more than 150 commercials in his twelve years long career. Some of his notable commercials are Sprite, eBay.in, Dell, KFC, ViseAC, IDEA, KOPIKO, Lotte Choco Pie, Kala Hit, Kingfisher Radler etc. Apart from working in small and big screen, Rishab Chadha has acted in commercial theater for three years with Out of the Box production. The Gone Case, Frying Pan and 786 are some of his notable theatrical works.

== Filmography ==
=== Films ===
Year	Title	Role	Notes
2011	Desi Boyz	Rohan's friend	
2014	Khoobsurat	Kabir, Mili's brother	
2015	Drishyam	Sameer Deshmukh	
2018	Lupt	Sam Tandon	

=== Television ===
Year	Title	Role	Channel	Notes
2007	Aladin	Nanhe	ZEE TV	
2011	Best of Luck Nikki	Kunal	Disney	
2012	The Suite Life of Karan & Kabir	Rahul	Disney	
2013	Khauff Begins... Ringa Ringa Roses	Subbu	Life OK	
2015-16	Kota Toppers	Siddharth	UTV Bindass	
2017	Aadat Se Majboor	JD	SAB TV	

=== Web series ===
Year	Title	Role	Platform	Notes
2016	Shadi Boys	Mukesh	Voot	
2019	Boys With Toys	Jiggy	Hungama App	
2019	Bhoot Purva	Aarav	ZEE5	
2024	Divorce Ke Liye Kuch Bhi Karega	Ashutosh Chawda	ZEE5	
