= Payback (2010 film) =

2010 Hindi-language thriller film

- Promotional poster
- Directed by: Sachin P. Karande
- Produced by: Sarosh Khan
- Starring: Munish Khan; Sara Khan; Gulshan Grover; Zakir Hussain; Mukesh Tiwari; Hrishikesh Joshi; Kunal Kumar
- Cinematography: Pathan Parvez Khan
- Edited by: Mukesh Thakur
- Music by: Dev Sikandar
- Production company: Archangel Entertainment
- Distributed by: Mirchi Movies
- Release date: 17 December 2010
- Country: India
- Language: Hindi
- Box office: ₹ 2.5 million (est.)

Payback is a Hindi thriller film, directed by Sachin P. Karande and produced by Sarosh Khan. The film was released on 17 December 2010 under the Archangel Entertainment banner.

== Plot ==
Insurance employee Kunal (Munish Khan) suffers an almost fatal accident but is rescued by passer-by Raghu (Zakir Hussain). Three months later, Kunal and Raghu meet again, and Kunal invites Raghu for tea. That night he realizes that Raghu, while his saviour, is an assassin who is hunted by his enemies. When Kunal's girlfriend (Sara Khan) becomes involved, Kunal must decide between saving his love and repaying his debt to Raghu.

== Cast ==
- Munish Khan as Kunal Sahay
- Sara Khan as Ishita Sahani
- Gulshan Grover as Inspector Sawant
- Zakir Hussain as Raghu Satoskar
- Mukesh Tiwari as Pakya
- Hrishikesh Joshi as Bhau Bhosle
- Kunal Kumar as Rohit Sharma

== Reception ==
Taran Adarsh, writing for Bollywood Hungama, was critical of the movie. While he lauded the chase scenes and found the film's one song "foot-tapping", he felt the constant moving of the camera got irritating and concluded the screenplay, which he described as "hackneyed", "uninteresting" and "inconsistent", ruined what might have otherwise been an interesting film.
