= Abigail Jain =

Indian television actress

- Born: Mumbai, Maharashtra, India
- Education: University of Mumbai
- Occupation: Actress
- Years active: 2007–present

Abigail Pande is an Indian television actress best known for her lead role in the series Humse Hai Liife. She also has a lead role in the Hindi television drama Kya Dill Mein Hai and in Zindagi Wins.

== Early life and career ==
Jain was born in Mumbai. She got the lead role of Kakoon in the serial Kya Dill Mein Hai on 9X. She had been a contestant in dance reality shows like Kaun Jeetege Bollywood Ka Ticket on 9X and Nachle Ve With Saroj Khan on NDTV Imagine. Later she played Sia Dhillion in Humse Hai Liife.

Jain played the lead role of Dr. Aaliya in the weekly medical drama Zindagi Wins on Bindass. She was declared the first runner up in Nach Baliye 8 along with her partner and boyfriend Sanam Johar.

Most recently, she was seen in Saubhagyalakshmi in 2016, Silsila Badalte Rishton Ka in 2018 and joined the cast of Shakti - Astitva Ke Ehsaas Ki in 2019.

== Personal life ==
Jain got engaged to boyfriend Sanam Johar during their participation in dance reality show Nach Baliye in 2017. Jain also practices yoga.

== Filmography ==
=== Television ===
Year	Title	Role	Notes	Ref.
2007–2008	Kya Dill Mein Hai	Kakoon Rahul Punj		
2008	Kaun Jeetega Bollywood Ka Ticket	Contestant		
2008–2009	Tujh Sang Preet Lagai Sajna	Geetika		
2009–2010	Sajan Ghar Jaana Hai	Madhu		
2010	Bandini	Mungi Waghela		
2010-2011	Dil Se Diya Vachan	Advocate Sumati Karmarkar		
2011–2012	Humse Hai Liife	Sia Dhillion		
2012–2013	V The Serial	Abigail Jain		
2013	Ek Thhi Naayka	Maahi		
2013	Yeh Hai Aashiqui	Komal	Episode: "Deadline"	
2013–2014	Savdhaan India	Priya	Episode 406	
2013–2014	Savdhaan India	Neha Kapadia Sinha	Episode 471	
2013–2014	Savdhaan India	Reha	Episode 638	
2013–2014	Khauff Begins... Ringa Ringa Roses	Maria		
2014	Gumrah: End of Innocence	Shweta		
2014	Halla Bol	Aarti		
2014	Maharakshak Aryan	Manasvi		
2014	Yeh Hai Aashiqui	Shikha	Episode: "Online Hero"	
2014–2015	Box Cricket League 1	Contestant		
2015	Zindagi Wins	Dr. Aaliya Akhtar		
2015	Yeh Hai Aashiqui	Jasmine	Episode: "Start-up"	
2016	Saubhagyalakshmi	Kavya Prajapati Ranawat		
2016	Pyaar Tune Kya Kiya	Simran	Season 6	
2016	D4 - Get Up and Dance	Aneri		
2016–2017	Naagarjuna - Ek Yoddha	Tina		
2017	Nach Baliye 8	Contestant	1st runners-up	
2018	Fear Files	Unknown		
2018	Silsila Badalte Rishton Ka	Dr. Mehak		
2018	Anjaan: Special Crimes Unit	Ananya		
2018–2019	Laal Ishq	Preeti	Episode: "Mayajal"	
2018–2019	Laal Ishq	Siya	Episode: "Mayavi Shev"	
2018–2019	Laal Ishq	Saniya	Episode: "Shaitan ki Aankhe"	
2018–2019	Laal Ishq	Harsha	Episode: "Icchapoorti Handya"	
2019	Shakti - Astitva Ke Ehsaas Ki	Riya		
2021	Aapki Nazron Ne Samjha	Shamika		
2022	Ziddi Dil Maane Na	Charu Pandya		

=== Web series ===
Year	Title	Role	Notes	Ref.
2020	Kashmakash: Kya Sahi Kya Galat	Jiya	Segment: "Jiya"	
2022	Dhappa	Anushka	Hungama Play	
2024	Sharma ji ki Shadi	Sunaina	YouTube series by Swagger Sharma	
2024	Divorce ke liye kuch bhi karega	Nikki Kothari	Zee5 series	
2025	The Great Indian Cricket Fan	Rhea	YouTube series by Balaji Telefilms	

== Awards and nominations ==
Year	Award	Category	Title	Result	Ref.
2008	Indian Telly Awards	Fresh New Face - Female	Kya Dill Mein Hai	Nominated	
2008	Gold Awards	Debut in a Lead Role (Female)	Kya Dill Mein Hai	Nominated	

== See also ==
- List of Indian television actresses
