= Ami Shubhash Bolchi =

- Promotional poster
- Directed by: Mahesh Manjrekar
- Written by: Mahesh Manjrekar; Abhijit Deshpande; Sabyasachi Dev Burman
- Starring: Mithun Chakraborty; Saheb Bhattacharya; Laboni Sarkar; Barkha Bisht Sengupta; Anindya Banerjee
- Cinematography: Shailesh Awasthi
- Edited by: Rahul Bhatnagar
- Music by: Ajit and Sameer
- Production company: Shree Venkatesh Films
- Release date: 12 August 2011
- Running time: 123 minutes
- Country: India
- Language: Bengali

Ami Shubhash Bolchi (lit. 'Subhas is speaking') is a 2011 Indian Bengali language vigilante action drama film written and directed by Mahesh Manjrekar, marking his directorial debut in Bengali cinema. Produced by Shrikant Mohta under the banner of Shree Venkatesh Films, it stars Mithun Chakraborty and Anindya Banerjee in lead roles, alongside Saheb Bhattacharya, Laboni Sarkar, Karan Aanand, Barkha Bisht Sengupta in other pivotal roles. It plots the story of an ordinary man Debabrata Bose, who is known to those who dislike him as a typical Bengali person. Unfortunately by the pressure of circumstances, when he shames himself for being born as a Bengali, the greatest freedom fighter Netaji Subhas Chandra Bose comes into his life to acknowledge the real power of the Bengali race. It is a remake of the director's Marathi film Me Shivajiraje Bhosale Boltoy.

Mithun said of the film: "I have done nearly 350 films and this is my boldest film, ever".

== Plot ==
Ami Shubhash Bolchi is the story of Netaji Subhas Chandra Bose who comes into the life of struggling Debabrata (Mithun) and through him, Netaji helps to awaken the Bengalis from "sleep" and acts as a super hero.

== Summary ==
Debabrata Bose happens to be a laid back 'typical middle class Bengali' who tries to change himself after repeated insults by various people in various forms. He also finds that, the Bengalis are bending backwards to please people of other communities and many Bengalis are deep rooted in large corruption. Entering as the greatest Bengali patriot ever, our 'Netaji', cannot keep quiet seeing all these, rises from immortality and makes a comeback to help Debabrata to rejuvenate and motivate the Bengalis. He helps Debabrata to stand up to voice against, particularly a non-Bengali promoter who plans to get hold of Debabrata's plot by kidnapping him and his family, but Debabrata manages to teach him a lesson with the help of invisible 'INA' sword given to him by Netaji.

== Cast ==
- Mithun Chakraborty as Debabrata Bose
- Saheb Bhattacharya as Rahul Bose, Debabrata's son
- Laboni Sarkar as Sumitra Bose, Debabrata's wife
- Barkha Bisht Sengupta as Charulata Bose, Debabrata's daughter
- Bharat Kaul as Ramniklal Gosalia, the real estate king
- Siddhartha Jadhav as Usman Mondal
- Anindya Banerjee as Netaji Subhash Chandra Bose
- Abhijit Lahiri as Chandramohan Laha
- Vineet Kumar Singh as Dubey (neighbour taxi driver)
- Karan Aanand as Karan
- Mahesh Manjrekar as Chhatrapati Shivaji Maharaj (cameo)
- Bharat Ganeshpure as Doctor
- Shubrajyoti Barat as Netaji's Deputy

== Reception ==
The movie was critically acclaimed by the critics. Mithun Chakroborty's performance was praised by all. The film went on to be an average grosser in box office.
