= Divorce Ke Liye Kuch Bhi Karega =

- Genre: Romantic comedy
- Written by: Ghalib Asad Bhopali
- Directed by: Ankush Bhatt
- Starring: Abigail Pande; Rishab Chadha
- Country of origin: India
- Original language: Hindi
- No. of seasons: 1

Production
- Producers: Shobhna Desai Productions; Zee Studios
- Cinematography: Krishna Ramanan
- Editor: Peter Gundra

Original release
- Network: ZEE5
- Release: 29 November 2024 – present

Divorce Ke Liye Kuch Bhi Karega is an Indian romantic comedy series directed by Ankush Bhatt and produced by Shobhna Desai Productions and Zee Studios. The lead roles are played by Abigail Pande and Rishab Chadha in key roles.

== Plot summary ==
The series follows the story of Nikki (Abigail Pande) and Ashu (Rishab Chadha), two journalists with vastly different personalities and backgrounds. They are assigned to investigate a marriage court scam and decide to go undercover by applying for what they believe to be a fake marriage. However, things take a hilarious turn when they discover their marriage is legally binding! The duo must navigate the comedic chaos that ensues, while juggling their undercover mission, leading to a series of amusing and heartfelt misadventures.

== Cast and characters ==
=== Main cast ===
- Rishab Chadha as Ashutosh Chawda
- Abigail Jain as Nikhat AKA Nikki
- Pankit Thakker as Panchal

=== Other cast ===
- Cindrella D. Cruz as Laxmi
- Chaitali Jadhav as Jayawanti
- Akanksha Saini as Devyani
- Keshav Uppal as Ajay
- Jignesh Joshi as Rangila
- Amitabh Krishna Ghanekar as Lawyer Chougule
- Rutuja Chipade as Falguni
- Sunit Razdan as Harshad Chawda
- Dhara Trivedi as Rama
- Amit Ghosh as Abdul
- Adil Feroz Khan as Kailash
- Krunal Shrimali as Inspector
- Amit Sinha as Mayank Mishra
- Aekpath Singhal as Amrita
- Sonal Mathur as Janhvi

== Episodes ==
No.	Title	Directed by	Written by	Original release date
1	"Phir Se Hui Subah Hai"	Ankush Bhatt	Ghalib Asad Bhopali	29 November 2024
Ashu, an eager reporter, meets Nikki, a respected senior reporter, at the news channel. They feel an instant connection, but soon find themselves in a tense situation where they must work together.
2	"Marriage Scam"	Ankush Bhatt	Ghalib Asad Bhopali	29 November 2024
Nikki and Ashu’s playful banter entertains their colleagues. When they are assigned to work together on a sting operation, they pose as a married couple to uncover a marriage registration scam.
3	"Yeh Shaadi Nahi Ho Sakti"	Ankush Bhatt	Ghalib Asad Bhopali	29 November 2024
The tension between Nikki and Ashu escalates as they clash over control of the prime-time slot. In an unexpected turn, their playful pranks are aired live, resulting in a surge in TRP for the channel.
4	"Divorce Lawyer Ki Talaash"	Ankush Bhatt	Ghalib Asad Bhopali	29 November 2024
Nikki and Ashu are stunned to discover that their fake marriage from the sting operation has been legally registered. When they seek a divorce from a lawyer, they are informed that they must wait for six months.
5	"Counselling Ke Side Effects"	Ankush Bhatt	Ghalib Asad Bhopali	29 November 2024
Ashu and Nikki are forced into mandatory counseling sessions. Nikki devises a plan to escape the sessions, putting Ashu in a difficult position. As they continue their fake marriage, it begins to impact their personal lives in unexpected ways.
6	"Jaan Pehchan"	Ankush Bhatt	Ghalib Asad Bhopali	29 November 2024
Nikki and Ashu keep attending the counseling sessions, but the lies are becoming harder to sustain. In an attempt to gather personal details about each other, they inadvertently make things more complicated, and their situation takes a turn for the worse.
7	"Pyaar Toh Hona Hi Tha"	Ankush Bhatt	Ghalib Asad Bhopali	29 November 2024
Nikki’s confession about the fake marriage sparks a confrontation between her fiancé and their families. As they navigate their personal and professional challenges, the day of their divorce finally arrives.

== Release and promotion ==
ZEE5 announced the series by releasing the trailer on 20 November 2024. The makers dropped the character poster of Rishab Chadha on 24 November 2024.

== Critical reception ==
Sarvjit Singh Chauhan of ABP News noted "Rishabh Chaddha got recognition when he appeared in Ajay Devgan's hit film Drishyam. In this series, he has done exactly what he was asked to do. However, while doing comedy, he seems to be working hard. Due to which his impact is not very special. But Abigail Pandey has played her role well. She looks flawless". Times of India's Sreeparna Sengupta rated the show 2.5 stars, noting that both Abigail Pande and Rishab Chadha deliver sincere performances and bring a fresh energy to the otherwise tepid show. She described "Divorce ke liye Kuch Bhi Karega" as a light-hearted, one-time watch. Risha Ganguly of Times Now News gave the show 3 stars. She mentioned that "while the show is an enjoyable watch for those seeking a breezy, laugh-filled rom-com, its predictable storytelling and uneven execution make it somewhat laborious to watch".
