= Aadat Se Majboor (TV series) =

Indian TV series

- Genre: Comedy
- Created by: Dharampal Thakur
- Written by: Bharat Kukreti; Dinesh Brigedier
- Directed by: Dharampal Thakur
- Starring: See below
- Music by: Manas-Shikhar; Anuj
- Country of origin: India
- Original language: Hindi
- No. of episodes: 105

Production
- Producers: Dharampal Thakur, Bharat Kukreti, Pankaj Sudhir Mishra
- Production location: Mumbai
- Camera setup: Multi Camera
- Running time: 22 minutes
- Production company: Team Productions

Original release
- Network: SAB TV
- Release: 3 October 2017 – 26 February 2018

Aadat Se Majboor (transl. Forced to habit) is an Indian comedy television series. The show aired from 3 October 2017 to 26 February 2018 on SAB TV.

== Plot ==
When five young people with completely different personalities work together in one space it is bound to create some competition as well as some comic situations. Such is the life of these five frenemies -Sunny, J.D, Ranjan, Riya and Sam who work together in a magazine publishing company filled with co-workers of individual personalities as well.

== Cast ==
=== Main ===
- Sana Makbul as Riya Tootejaa
- Vanshika Sharma as Samiksha, a.k.a. Sam
- Anuj Pandit Sharma as Sunny Sharma
- Rishab Chadha as Jamnadas Dhirubhai Majithia, a.k.a. JD
- Haresh K Raut as Ranjan
- Anant Mahadevan as Roshan Lal Tootejaa/Darshan Lal Tootejaa

=== Recurring ===
- Shekhar Shukla as Mr. Patel
- Pragati Mehra as Menka
- Pratik Parihar as Rupesh Patel
- Melissa Pais as Inspector Rohini Talpade
- Manmeet Grewal as Manmeet Singh
- Surleen Kaur as Surleen
- Ajay Jadhav as Constable Ajay Pawar

=== Guest cast ===
- Krishna Abhishek as Bunty Sharma
- Mithun Chakraborty as Himself
- Kapil Sharma as Himself
- Bharti Singh as Herself
