= Sara Khan (actress, born 1985) =

Indian actress (born 1985)

Sara Arfeen Khan
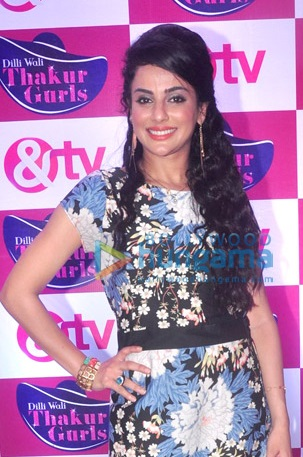
- Khan at the launch of Dilli Wali Thakur Gurls in 2015
- Born: 9 November 1985 (age 40); Mumbai, Maharashtra, India
- Occupations: Actress, television host
- Years active: 1990–present
- Spouse: Arfeen Khan

Sara Arfeen Khan (born 9 November 1985) is an Indian mind coach, actress, and television host.

As a mind coach, she mainly focusses on training towards mental well-being and self-empowerment. As an actress, Khan is best known for her role as Alka Tiwari in STAR One's serial Dhoondh Legi Manzil Humein and host in Kahi Suni travel show of epic channel and Love Ka Hai Intezaar as Maharani Vijayalakshmi Ranawat. She was a contestant on the Indian reality show, Bigg Boss 18. Sara Arfeen Khan stars as Mrigya/Iqra Hafeez in Singham Again, which was released in theaters on November 1, 2024, coinciding with the Diwali festival.

== Television ==
Year	Show	Role	Notes
2010–2011	Dhoondh Legi Manzil Humein	Alka	
2011	C.I.D. (Episode 889 – Abhijeet Ki Deewani)	Roshni	
2015	Zindagi Wins	Dr. Malvika Seth	
2015	Dilli Wali Thakur Gurls	Anjini	
2015	Kahi Suni		
2015–2016	Siya Ke Ram	Surpanakha	
2016	Killer Karaoke Atka Toh Latkah	Contestant	
2016–2017	Jamai Raja	Fake Mahi Satya Sawant / Aleena Verma	
2017	Fear Files (Season 3; Episode 17)	Suhana	
2017	Agent Raghav – Crime Branch	Radhika	
2017	Love Ka Hai Intezaar	Maharani Vijayalakshmi Ranawat	
2024	Bigg Boss 18	Contestant	Evicted (11th place)

== Films ==
Year	Show	Role	Language	Notes
2010	Payback	Ishita Sahani	Hindi	
2014	Total Siyappa	Jiah Singh	Hindi	
2017	Sargoshiyan	Sheena Oberoi	Hindi	
2021	Sooryavanshi	Iqra Hafeez	Hindi	
2024	Singham Again	Mrigya/Iqra Hafeez	Hindi	
