= Kaun Jeetega Bollywood Ka Ticket =

Indian reality series

- Created by: Balaji Telefilms; Popcorn Entertainment
- Starring: See below
- Country of origin: India
- No. of episodes: 26

Production
- Producers: Shobha Kapoor; Ekta Kapoor; Suneil Shetty
- Running time: approximately 52 minutes

Original release
- Network: 9X
- Release: 6 July – 28 December 2008

Kaun Jeetega Bollywood Ka Ticket (transl. Who will win the ticket to Bollywood) is an Indian television reality show that aired on 9X from 20 July 2008 to 17 November 2008. The winners of the series were TV actors Naman Shaw and partner Bindu.

== Mentors ==
- Zeenat Aman
- Shabana Azmi
- Amrita Singh
- Mahesh Manjrekar

== Contestants ==
The following is the list of celebrity contestants of the series.

- Kratika Sengar
- Naman Shaw
- Jay Bhanushali
- Dimple Jhangiani
- Chetan Hansraj
- Panchi Bora
- Reshmi Ghosh
- Twinkle Bajpai
- Akashdeep Saigal
- Abigail Jain
- Karan Patel
- Karishma Tanna
- Raj Singh Arora
- Vikas Manaktala
- Mihika Verma
- Mayank Gandhi
- Sanyogita Maheshwari Mayor
- Karan Wahi
- Drashti Dhami
- Archana Taide
