= Zindagi Wins =

- Genre: Medical drama
- Created by: Siddharth Malhotra
- Screenplay by: Anantika Sahir
- Story by: Sameer Arora
- Directed by: Abhijit Das; Vikram Labhe; Sunith
- Creative director: Anindita Sinha
- Starring: See below
- Music by: Raju Singh
- Country of origin: India
- Original language: Hindi
- No. of seasons: 1
- No. of episodes: 24

Production
- Producers: Prem Krishen Malhotra; Siddharth Malhotra; Sunil Mehta
- Production location: Mumbai
- Running time: Approx. 41 minutes
- Production company: Cinevistaas Limited

Original release
- Network: Bindass
- Release: 21 February – 13 June 2015

Zindagi Wins (translation: Life Wins) is an Indian medical drama series that aired on channel Bindass from 21 February 2015 to 13 June 2015. The show was produced by Cinevistaas Limited.

The show portrays the journey of Dr. Alia, Dr. Malavika and Dr. Ishaan at Lifebeat Hospital and their quest for medical excellence with their different values and ethics and also how they take Lifebeat to greater heights.

== Plot ==
Dr. Alia Akhtar(Abigail Jain), a cardiologist, joins Lifebeat Hospital at Mumbai. She finds herself at odds with Dr. Malvika Seth (Sara Khan), a Neuro Surgeon due to their differences in the methods of treatment. Dr. Alia believes in listening to the heart while Dr. Malvika believes in listening to the brain. Due to their differences and Alia's 'listen-to-the-heart approach', she gets into trouble every time. Enter Dr. Ishaan Srinivas (Kiran Srinivas), a psychiatrist, who befriends Alia and helps her out in every situations. Alia reveals to Ishaan that she is in search of her missing father, Major Akhtar for the past 5 years. Ishaan consoles Alia and promises her to stay with her always. Alia on knowing that Ishaan and Malvika broke up few months ago, but still love each other, decides to help them patch up. But Alia falls in love with Ishaan and decides to confess her feelings. By that time Ishaan and Malvika patch up leaving Alia heartbroken after which Alia starts avoiding Ishaan to give them space. Dr. Veer, (Kushaal Punjabi) an ex-army doctor who has worked with Alia's father, also joins the hospital. Veer's interference in hospital matters and his straightforward and tough approach in treating patients irks Alia, Malvika and Ishaan. Alia and Ishaan end up exposing an illegal organ trafficking racket in Lifebeat Hospital that leads to the expulsion of Dr. Sinha from the hospital. Alia and Veer bond as she learns about her father from Veer. Ishaan and Alia solves the issues between them but Alia decides to stay away from Ishaan as she overhears Malvika's demand before Ishaan to choose between his friend (Alia) and his girlfriend(Malvika). Ishaan gets jealous on Veer's close approach with Alia. He starts missing Alia which creates problems between him and Malvika. Ishaan then realizes that he is actually in love with Alia and confesses his feelings to her. At the same time, Veer falls in love with Alia and confesses his feelings to her. Malvika's estranged father Dr. Bedi takes over the reins at Lifebeat Hospital. Alia recognizes him as the doctor who once saved her father's life. On her insistence, Malvika and her father patch up their differences and this leads to Malvika beginning to trust Alia. Alia, who is a fan of Dr. Bedi, sacrifices her love for Ishaan and accepts Veer's proposal in front of everyone in the hospital which shocks Ishaan. Ishaan learns about Alia's feelings for him from Dr. Sahil, younger brother of Alia's best friend. Alia, Veer, Ishaan, and Malavika go on a double date where Ishaan begs Alia to break up with Veer and listen to her heart while Alia rejects him saying that they would be cheating on Malvika and Veer. Malvika overhears this conversation and slaps Alia in front of everyone. With the help of Ishaan, Alia discovers that her father went missing because of Veer, which leaves Alia shattered and she meets with an accident. Ishaan realises Veer's love for Alia as he brought Alia back to life when her condition became critical. Malvika realises her mistakes and let Ishaan and Alia unite. Ishaan suggests Alia to accept Veer's love and decides to leave to London. Alia plays a prank on Ishaan with the help of Veer and Malvika so that he does not leave to London and confesses her love to Ishaan. Ishaan and Alia realise that they are meant to be together and unites.

== Cast ==
- Abigail Jain as Dr. Alia Akhter
- Sara Khan as Dr. Malvika Seth
- Kiran Srinivas as Dr. Ishaan Srinivas
- Kushal Punjabi as Dr. Veer Asthana
- Vidya Sinha as Nurse Mariam
- Rio Kapadia as Dr. Bedi
- Mihir Mishra as Dr. Sinha
- Dishank Arora as Managing Director K.D.
- Vicky Arora as Mak
- Meera Deosthale as Riya
- Kamalika Guha Thakurta as Vandita Srinivas
- Amit Behl as Col. Shadab Akhter
