= Roshni Walia =

Indian actress (born 2001)

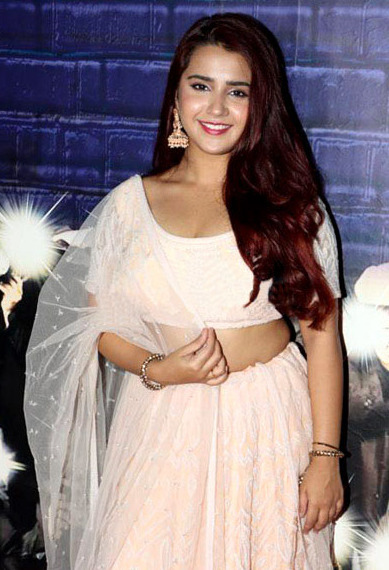
- Walia in 2022
- Born: 20 September 2001 (age 24); Prayagraj, Uttar Pradesh, India
- Occupation: Actress
- Years active: 2010–present
- Notable work: Maharana Pratap; Tara From Satara

Roshni Walia (born 20 September 2001) is an Indian actress who primarily works in Hindi television. She is best known for her roles in Bharat Ka Veer Putra – Maharana Pratap and Tara From Satara. Her notable films include My Friend Ganesha 4 and Son of Sardaar 2.

== Early life ==
Roshni Walia was born on 20 September 2001 in Prayagraj, Uttar Pradesh, India. She currently resides in Mumbai. Her mother is Sweety Walia, and she has an older sister named Noor Walia. Walia's maternal grandfather was an army officer.

== Career ==
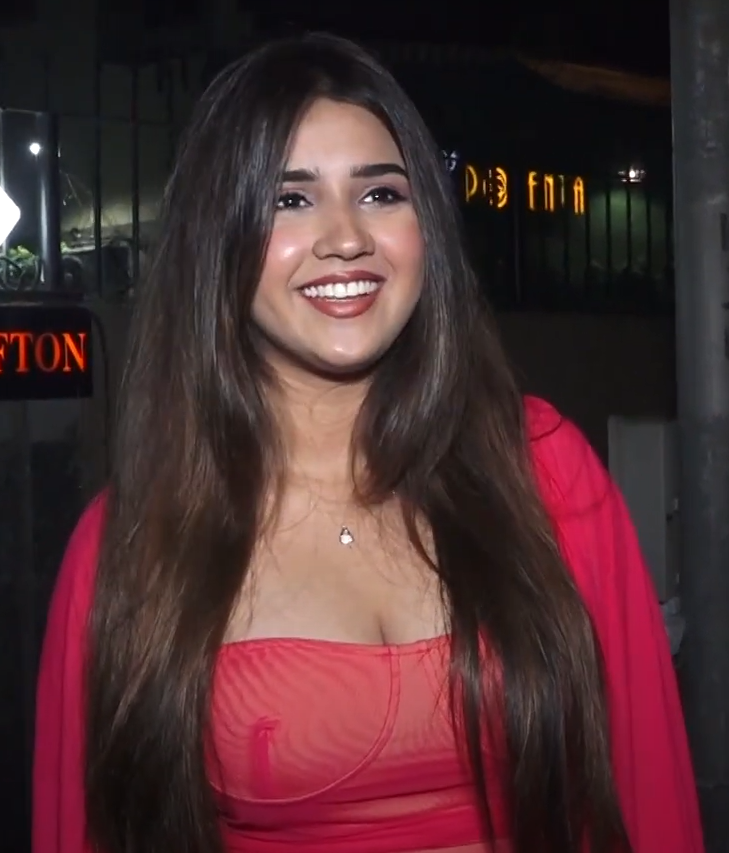
Walia in 2022

Walia began her career in the entertainment industry with television commercials. Her first advertisement was for Nutree's Nuggets, where she earned 7,000 rupees at the age of seven.

Her television debut was in 2012 with the Life OK drama series Main Lakshmi Tere Aangan Ki, where she portrayed the character Jiyana. In the same year, she appeared in the film My Friend Ganesha 4 as Lucky.

In 2013, Walia portrayed Maitri in the Indian horror TV series Khauff Begins... Ringa Ringa Roses, which aired on Life OK from 30 November 2013 to 19 January 2014. Her character, Maitri, believed her father to be a superhero who combats supernatural forces, contributing to the show's storyline of action, horror, and thriller elements.

Walia played the role of young Ganga Singh in the Indian drama series Balika Vadhu – Kacchi Umar Ke Pakke Rishte. Her character, Ganga, was portrayed during her childhood years in the show, which aired from 2013 to 2014. Ganga was the daughter of Ratan Singh and later became involved in significant storylines within the series.

Walia portrayed the role of young Sati in the mythological drama series Devon Ke Dev...Mahadev. In the show, she depicted the childhood of Sati, the daughter of Daksha and Prasuti.

In 2014, Walia gained popularity for her role in the acclaimed television series Bharat Ka Veer Putra – Maharana Pratap, where she portrayed young Maharani Ajabde Punwar, the first wife of Maharana Pratap opposite Faisal Khan. She appeared in episodes 168 to 289, marking a significant period in her acting career. This performance earned her a nomination for Best Child Actor - Female at the 13th Indian Telly Awards.

In 2015, Walia portrayed Young Survi in the television drama series Yeh Vaada Raha, which aired on Zee TV from 2015 to 2017. Her role contributed to the show's narrative focused on romance, drama, and family dynamics set in Maharashtra.

in 2019, Walia portrayed the main character, Tara Mane, in the Indian family drama television series Tara From Satara, which premiered on 19 August 2019 on Sony Entertainment Television. In the series, she plays a young girl from Satara who is passionate about Bollywood dance, despite her father's opposition.

== Filmography ==
=== Films ===
Year	Title	Role
2012	My Friend Ganesha 4	Lucky
2014	Machhli Jal Ki Rani Hai	Guddi
2016	Gangs of Littles	Benjir Kaif
2017	Firangi	Nimmo
2019	I Am Banni	Banni
2025	Son of Sardaar 2	Saba / Simran

=== Television ===
Year	Title	Role
2012	Main Lakshmi Tere Aangan Ki	Jiyana
2013	Balika Vadhu – Kacchi Umar Ke Pakke Rishte	Young Ganga
2013	Devon Ke Dev...Mahadev	Teenage Sita
2013	Khauff Begins... Ringa Ringa Roses	Maitri
2014	Bharat Ka Veer Putra – Maharana Pratap	Young Ajabde Purwar
2015	Yeh Vaada Raha	Survi
2019	Tara From Satara	Tara Mane

=== Web series ===
Year	Title	Role
2018	Zero KMS	Alia
2024	Naam Namak Nishan	Nia

=== Music videos ===
Year	Title	Singer	Ref.
2022	Kudi Badi Cutie	Yolo	
2023	Silli Silli	Rochak Kohli, Danish Sabri	
2024	Dil Paagal	Laqshay Kapoor	
2025	FOMO	Jordan Sandhu	

== Awards and nominations ==
Year	Recipient	Category	Work	Result	Ref.
2014	Indian Telly Awards	Best Child Actor - Female	Maharana Pratap	Nominated	
