= New York (2009 film) =

2009 Indian Hindi film by Kabir Khan

- Theatrical release poster
- Directed by: Kabir Khan
- Written by: Sandeep Shrivastava
- Story by: Aditya Chopra
- Produced by: Aditya Chopra
- Starring: John Abraham; Katrina Kaif; Neil Nitin Mukesh; Irrfan Khan
- Cinematography: Aseem Mishra
- Edited by: Rameshwar S. Bhagat
- Music by: Songs: Pritam; Guest Composition: Pankaj Awasthi; Background Score: Julius Packiam
- Production company: Yash Raj Films
- Distributed by: Yash Raj Films
- Release date: 26 June 2009
- Running time: 151 minutes
- Country: India
- Language: Hindi
- Box office: ₹74.63 crore

New York is a 2009 Indian Hindi-language crime drama film directed by Kabir Khan, written by Sandeep Shrivastava, and produced by Aditya Chopra under the banner of Yash Raj Films. The film stars John Abraham, Katrina Kaif, Neil Nitin Mukesh, and Irrfan Khan. Set against the backdrop of post-9/11 America, the narrative follows three friends studying at the fictional New York State University whose lives are drastically altered in the aftermath of the September 11 attacks and the resulting socio-political fallout.

New York marked Kabir Khan's second directorial venture with Yash Raj Films after his award-winning debut Kabul Express (2006), which also starred Abraham, and featured cinematography by Aseem Mishra and editing by Rameshwar S. Bhagat. Principal photography took place in New York City and Philadelphia, with portions shot in India. Julius Packiam composed the background score in his second collaboration with both Chopra and Kabir after Kabul Express, while the soundtrack was composed by Pritam, with lyrics by Shrivastava; one song was guest-composed and sung by Pankaj Awasthi and guest-written by Junaid Wasi.

Released theatrically on 26 June 2009, New York received largely positive reviews from critics, who praised its direction, screenplay, and the performances of the principal cast—particularly those of Abraham, Mukesh, and Kaif. The film emerged as a commercial success and ranked as the sixth-highest grossing Hindi film of the year.

At the 55th Filmfare Awards, New York received two nominations: Best Actress (Kaif) and Best Supporting Actor (Mukesh).

== Plot ==
Sometime in 2008, Omar Aijaz, a young Indian man living in the United States, is arrested by the FBI after weapons are found in the trunk of a taxi registered to him. He is interrogated by Agent Roshan, a South Asian origin officer who has lived in the U.S. for two decades. Roshan suspects Omar's involvement with Samir "Sam" Sheikh, a former college friend believed to be connected to terrorist activities. Omar, unaware of Sam's current life, is pressured into cooperating with the FBI to spy on him.

The narrative shifts to a flashback from 1999, when Omar arrived in the U.S. to attend New York State University for his Master Degree. There, he befriends Sam and Maya, a fellow student and counselor. The three form a close bond, though Omar secretly harbours feelings for Maya. Over time, Maya and Sam fall in love, prompting Omar to distance himself. Their lives are disrupted by the September 11 attacks.

Back to the present, Omar reconnects with Sam and Maya—now married with a son, Danyal—under the guise of rekindling old friendships, while secretly reporting to Roshan. He learns Maya is involved in civil rights activism, helping Sam's employee and former detainee Zilgai cope with trauma from his post-9/11 arrest. Initially, Omar finds no incriminating evidence against Sam, but gradually uncovers deeper layers of Sam's past. Sam had been detained at Guantánamo Bay for nine months due to circumstantial evidence and was tortured. Though later exonerated, the experience left him emotionally scarred and radicalised.

A turning point arrives when Zilgai, unable to reintegrate into society, kills a police officer and leads the police on a long chase ultimately ending in his death by suicide; in the aftermath, Sam appears to abandon his plans for a terrorist attack. However, Omar later discovers the plan is still active. He alerts Roshan, and in the final act, Sam is persuaded to surrender. As he complies, he is shot dead by FBI snipers. Maya, rushing to stop him, is also killed in stray crossfire and the couple story ends in a Bonnie and Clyde style.

The film concludes six months later with Omar adopting Danyal. Roshan, now recognised for his service, comforts Omar, explaining that while everyone believed they were doing the right thing, timing and choices shaped their fates. The story ends with a reflection on friendship, trauma, and the long-lasting consequences of 9/11.

== Cast ==
- John Abraham as Samir "Sam" Sheikh, Maya's husband
- Katrina Kaif as Maya Sheikh, Sam's wife
- Neil Nitin Mukesh as Omar Ajjaz
- Irrfan Khan as FBI Agent Roshan
- Nawazuddin Siddiqui as Zilgai
- Aidan Wagner as Danyal Sheikh
- Ali Quli Mirza as Zaheer
- Samrat Chakrabarti as Yakub

== Themes ==
New York explores the social and political aftermath of the September 11 attacks, focusing particularly on issues of racial profiling, civil liberties, and the psychological consequences of wrongful detention. In a June 2009 interview with the Indo-Asian News Service (IANS), director Kabir Khan stated that the film "is based on part of the political canvas of 9/11, but it speaks of prejudices after the great human tragedy." He added that the narrative "divides time into a pre- and post-9/11 world" to emphasise the long-term global repercussions of the attacks. Khan also noted that the film was supported by the New York Film Commission, describing it as “a very balanced story and not a jingoistic film.”

In a separate interview with IANS, actor John Abraham remarked that New York, “in its own strange way,” begins where the Pakistani film Khuda Kay Liye (2007) ends. He highlighted that both directors—Kabir Khan and Shoaib Mansoor—present different interpretations of the experience of legal detainees, based on their respective research and narrative approaches.

The film's storyline has drawn comparisons to "The Greater Good", the twenty-first episode of the American television series Lost (2004–2010), due to thematic similarities in exploring detainment, trauma, and ideological conflict.

== Production ==
=== Development ===
New York was directed by Kabir Khan and produced by Aditya Chopra under Yash Raj Films. Khan submitted the script to U.S. authorities for approval prior to filming. He later noted that the production received clearance without objections and described the film as a balanced portrayal of post-9/11 issues.

=== Casting ===
John Abraham prepared for his role as an American Muslim of Indian origin by studying the Quran. The cast also included Katrina Kaif, Neil Nitin Mukesh, and Irrfan Khan.

=== Filming ===
Principal photography began in September 2008 and lasted over 100 days. While most of the film was shot in New York City, some scenes were filmed in Philadelphia. New York was the first Hindi film to have an extended production schedule in the city. The team also shot for three days at Guantánamo Bay with official permission.

== Soundtrack ==
New York

Soundtrack album by Pritam Chakraborty
- Released: April 2009 (Audio Cassette and CD); 10 June 2009 (Digital)
- Genre: Film soundtrack
- Length: 42:12
- Label: YRF Music
- Producer: Pritam

Pritam Chakraborty chronology
Ek: The Power of One (2009)	New York (2009)	Love Aaj Kal (2009)

The soundtrack of New York was released in April 2009 on physical format (i.e., Music CDs and Cassettes) and on 10 June 2009 on digital format (i.e., iTunes). It was composed by Pritam, with lyrics by Sandeep Shrivastava. Julius Packiam provided the background score, while Pankaj Awasthi composed and performed the track "Aye Saaye Mere", written by Junaid Wasi. A remix of "Hai Junoon," featured separately as a standalone music video, was sung by K.K. and Monali Thakur.

New York (Original Motion Picture Soundtrack)
No.	Title	Lyrics	Music	Singer(s)	Length
1.	"Hai Junoon"	Sandeep Shrivastava	Pritam	K.K.	5:31
2.	"Mere Sang"	Sandeep Shrivastava	Pritam	Sunidhi Chauhan	6:28
3.	"Tune Jo Na Kaha"	Sandeep Shrivastava	Pritam	Mohit Chauhan	5:10
4.	"Aye Saaye Mere"	Junaid Wasi	Pankaj Awasthi	Pankaj Awasthi	5:45
5.	"Hai Junoon" (Remix by Julius Packiam)	Sandeep Shrivastava	Pritam	K.K.	6:09
6.	"Mere Sang" (Remix by Julius Packiam)	Sandeep Shrivastava	Pritam	Sunidhi Chauhan	5:55
7.	"Sam's Theme"	Caralisa Monteiro	Julius Packiam	Caralisa Monteiro	4:05
8.	"New York Theme"	Instrumental	Julius Packiam	Instrumental	3:09
Total length:					42:12

== Release ==
=== Festival screenings ===
New York was selected as the opening film for the 33rd Cairo International Film Festival, where it was screened on 10 November 2009. Director Kabir Khan attended the event and addressed the audience following the screening. The film was also shown at the Busan International Film Festival in October 2009, where Yash Chopra, founder of Yash Raj Films, received the Asian Filmmaker of the Year award.

=== Home media ===
The DVD release of New York took place on 8 August 2009. The edition included approximately 2.5 hours of bonus content, including behind-the-scenes footage, deleted scenes, and promotional material. Joginder Tuteja of Bollywood Hungama rated the DVD release four out of five stars.

== Reception ==
=== Box office ===
New York opened to strong box office performance, grossing ₹35 million during its first three days in India with occupancy rates of 80–85%—the highest since January 2009. It topped the domestic box office in its opening week and earned ₹618.9 million worldwide, later being declared a hit. The film completed a six-week theatrical run in India with a domestic gross of ₹155.5 million.

Internationally, New York performed well in key markets including the Middle East, Australia, the United Kingdom, and the United States. It was the sixth-highest grossing Hindi film of the year, with a total gross of approximately ₹577.5 million.

=== Critical reception ===
New York received positive reviews from critics, with praise directed toward its performances, screenplay, and handling of post-9/11 themes.

Subhash K. Jha described it as "an important film" that avoids stereotypical portrayals of the diaspora and explores global prejudices with sensitivity. Devansh Patel of the Hounslow Chronicle rated it five out of five, calling it "the most thought-provoking movie Yash Raj Films has ever come up with." Nikhat Kazmi of The Times of India gave it four out of five, calling it "an extremely taut and highly emotive piece of political drama [...] topical, meaningful, and entertaining."

Taran Adarsh of Bollywood Hungama rated the film four out of five, highlighting the screenplay and cinematography, and calling it "one of the finest films produced by this premier production house." Joginder Tuteja of Indo-Asian News Service noted that the film "has a message and still carries enough commercial ingredients to reach out to masses as well as classes."

Comparisons were drawn to other films with similar themes, such as Arlington Road (1999) and Khuda Kay Liye (2007). Jayant of Hindustan Times considered New York the stronger film in execution and impact. NDTV called it “an A-list film that gets a straight A,” while Sakaal Times praised its balance of realism and drama. The Statesman wrote that the film “entertains and makes viewers think.”

== Accolades ==
Award	Date of the ceremony	Category	Recipients	Result	Ref
Cairo International Film Festival	10–20 November 2009	Golden Pyramid Award	New York	Nominated	
V. Shantaram Awards	21 December 2009	Best Film	New York	Nominated	
V. Shantaram Awards	21 December 2009	Best Director	Kabir Khan	Nominated	
V. Shantaram Awards	21 December 2009	Best Actor	John Abraham	Nominated	
V. Shantaram Awards	21 December 2009	Best Supporting Actor	Irrfan Khan	Won	
V. Shantaram Awards	21 December 2009	Best Story & Screenplay	Aditya Chopra	Won	
Producers Guild Film Awards	8 January 2010	Best Actor in a Supporting Role	Irrfan Khan	Nominated	
Producers Guild Film Awards	8 January 2010	Best Sound Recording	Anuj Mathur	Won	
Screen Awards	10 January 2010	Best Actor (Popular Choice)	John Abraham	Nominated	
Screen Awards	10 January 2010	Best Actress	Katrina Kaif	Nominated	
Screen Awards	10 January 2010	Best Actress (Popular Choice)	Katrina Kaif	Nominated	
Stardust Awards	17 January 2010	Best Film – Thriller or Action	New York	Nominated	
Stardust Awards	17 January 2010	Actor of the Year – Female	Katrina Kaif (also for Ajab Prem Ki Ghazab Kahani)	Nominated	
Stardust Awards	17 January 2010	Best Actress (Popular)	Katrina Kaif (also for Ajab Prem Ki Ghazab Kahani)	Nominated	
Stardust Awards	17 January 2010	Superstar of Tomorrow – Male	Neil Nitin Mukesh	Nominated	
Filmfare Awards	27 February 2010	Best Actress	Katrina Kaif	Nominated	
Filmfare Awards	27 February 2010	Best Supporting Actor	Neil Nitin Mukesh	Nominated	
IIFA Awards	3–5 June 2010	Best Supporting Actor	Irrfan Khan	Nominated	

== See also ==
- List of cultural references to the September 11 attacks
