= Ek Tha Tiger =

2012 Indian film by Kabir Khan

- Theatrical release poster
- Directed by: Kabir Khan
- Written by: Kabir Khan; Neelesh Misra
- Story by: Aditya Chopra
- Produced by: Aditya Chopra
- Starring: Salman Khan; Katrina Kaif; Ranvir Shorey
- Cinematography: Aseem Mishra
- Edited by: Rameshwar S. Bhagat
- Music by: Songs: Sohail Sen; Guest Composers: Sajid–Wajid; Background Score: Julius Packiam
- Production company: Yash Raj Films
- Distributed by: Yash Raj Films
- Release date: 15 August 2012 (India)
- Running time: 132 minutes
- Country: India
- Language: Hindi
- Budget: ₹75 crore
- Box office: ₹334.39 crore

Ek Tha Tiger (transl. There Was a Tiger) is a 2012 Indian Hindi-language action thriller film directed and co-written by Kabir Khan. Produced by Aditya Chopra under Yash Raj Films, it is the first installment in the YRF Spy Universe, and stars Salman Khan, Katrina Kaif, Ranvir Shorey, Roshan Seth, Girish Karnad, and Gavie Chahal. In the film, RAW agent Tiger (Khan) is tasked with recovering information before it is gained by Pakistan, but is sidetracked after falling in love with Zoya (Kaif).

Ek Tha Tiger marks the third collaboration between Kabir Khan and Yash Raj Films, after he directed Kabul Express (2006) and New York (2009), and the first collaboration between Yash Raj Films and Salman Khan. The last film to be presented by founder and filmmaker Yash Chopra, it had a complicated production process, with delays, rewrites, and several cast members attached at various points. Principal photography began in August 2011 and lasted until July 2012, with filming locations including Dublin, Havana, Bangkok, Istanbul, and Delhi. The film's music was composed primarily by Sohail Sen, with the soundtrack's lead single and the film's theme song, "Mashallah", composed by Sajid-Wajid. Originally set for release in June 2012, the film was theatrically released worldwide by Yash Raj on 15 August 2012.

Ek Tha Tiger received generally positive reviews from critics. Ek Tha Tiger set numerous box-office records in its theatrical run, grossing ₹334.39 crore (US$62.58 million) worldwide. It was the highest-grossing Hindi film of 2012 unadjusted for inflation, and set the then-record for the highest-grossing domestic opening weekend, with ₹57.9 crore (US$10.84 million). The film won Best Special Effects at the 14th IIFA Awards and won five People's Choice Awards, including Best Film, Best Actor for Khan, and Best Actress for Kaif. A sequel, Tiger Zinda Hai, was released on 22 December 2017, and a third film, Tiger 3, was released on 12 November 2023.

== Plot ==
Avinash "Tiger" Singh Rathore, a RAW officer, is forced to kill Rabinder, one of his men, for defecting to Pakistan's spy agency ISI while in Iraq. Disappointed that his missions always feature violence, Tiger's boss, Shenoy, deploys him on a mission in Dublin to observe Anwar Jamal Kidwai, an Indian scientist who teaches at Trinity College and is suspected of developing novel anti-missile technology. Tiger's handler, Gopi, accompanies him to Dublin.

Tiger poses as Manish Chandra, a non-fiction author writing a book on Kidwai and other Indian academics. To access his house, Tiger befriends Kidwai's caretaker, Zoya Nazar Jung, a British-Indian Trinity College dance student. Over time, they fall in love and she invites him to "My Son, Pinocchio", a college play sponsored by Kidwai which she choreographed. A few days later, Tiger is attacked by a mystery assailant, with him and Gopi fearing their identities have been compromised. After seeing the assailant on the day of the play, Tiger chases him through Dublin, which leads to Tiger publicly preventing a Luas train crash. During the play, Gopi calls Tiger to inform him of activity at Kidwai's house. There, Tiger discovers Zoya is an ISI agent tasked to steal Kidwai's research.

Zoya refuses to hand over the research to Tiger and return to India with him; he lets her go after combating an attack by Feroz, an ISI agent, who is revealed to be Tiger's mystery assailant. Back in India, Tiger asks to be removed from field duty, and completes analysis with his colleague, Bagga, who shows him an intercepted Pakistani secret message. Tiger deduces the message was planted by Zoya, informing him of her planned arrival at an upcoming UN meeting in Istanbul. Tiger and Zoya meet and decide to elope; after misleading their respective agencies to Astana, Tiger and Zoya travel to Havana.

Tiger and Zoya are tracked down when they foil a mugging attempt, with video surveillance reaching RAW and ISI. After being spotted at an amateur boxing match, the couple attempt to flee Havana, but Zoya is arrested by the Cuban police and handed over to the ISI. Tiger then meets Gopi, and tells him Zoya will co-operate with RAW in exchange for her escape. Tiger and Gopi lead a team to intercept Zoya's prisoner transport convoy, but Tiger and Zoya escape in a light aircraft they had stationed in a nearby field; Tiger is also non-fatally shot by Gopi. Sometime later, Tiger calls Shenoy and informs him that he and Zoya will return home when Pakistan and India no longer need ISI and RAW.

In the epilogue, several sightings of Tiger and Zoya are reported in Venice, Cape Town, Zurich, and London.

== Cast ==
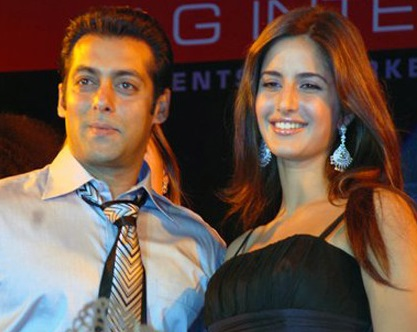
Ek Tha Tiger marks the fourth feature film to star Salman Khan and Katrina Kaif.

- Salman Khan as Avinash "Tiger" Singh Rathore, a RAW agent who goes undercover under the alias "Manish Chandra" to spy on Anwar Kidwai
- Katrina Kaif as Zoya Nazar Jung, an ISI agent who goes undercover to counteract the efforts of Tiger
- Ranvir Shorey as Gopi Arya, a RAW agent and Tiger's handler
- Roshan Seth as Anwar Kidwai, an Indian scientist and Trinity College Dublin professor whose missile research is sought by RAW and the ISI
- Girish Karnad as Ajit Shenoy, the chief of RAW
- Gavie Chahal as Abrar Sheikh, a section captain of the ISI
- Samar Jai Singh as Rabinder, a RAW agent who defects to the ISI
- Troi Ge Borde as Feroz, an ISI agent
- Bhupesh Singh as a RAW agent
- Sanjay Gurbaxani as a RAW agent
- Aaran Chaudhary as Tokas, an ISI agent
- Ashok Awasthi as Indian foreign minister
- Zarksis Khandhadia as Pakistani foreign minister
- Lisa Byrne as Amelie
- Justin Fuentes as Brad
- Alison Flood as Fairy
- Rikki McTiernan as Pinocchio
- Juhi Parmar as a news reporter in Istanbul
- Ranjeev Varma as Indian driver in Nur-Sultan
- Yogi Raj as Pakistani driver in Nur-Sultan
- Tevfik Cemal Inceoglu as a forger
- Rocket as itself, a pet pug

== Production ==
=== Development ===
After Kabir Khan was announced as director to a then-untitled action film, he approached Shah Rukh Khan with a draft of the screenplay. Although interested, Khan could not star in the film due to scheduling conflicts with Don 2 (2011) and Jab Tak Hai Jaan (2012). This allowed the film's screenplay, which had been completed in November 2010, to undergo changes well into shooting, including as late as February 2012. In May 2011, several reports confirmed Salman Khan and Katrina Kaif would star in a film titled Ek Tha Tiger. It would be Khan's first venture with Yash Raj Films, and the pair's fourth film together, after Maine Pyaar Kyun Kiya? (2005), Partner (2007), and Yuvvraaj (2008). In order to begin filming, Khan had to postpone the development of Sher Khan, a yet unrealized project he began developing with his brother, Sohail Khan. Khan was paid a reported ₹32 crore (US$5.99 million) to star in the film. Kaif, who only appeared in one action film prior to Ek Tha Tiger (2008's Race), performed her own stunts.

Kabir Khan wrote scenes specifically to include Trinity College, considering it "a character of repute"; he had previously visited the university in mid-1995 to interview then Irish President Mary Robinson. According to Avtar Panesar, Vice President of International Operations at Yash Raj, all locations were ultimately motivated by the screenplay, stating "if it fits the script, if it works, we then make use of the country as a location".

The rest of the cast was finalized over the following year; Ranvir Shorey signed on in April 2012, while the film marks the Bollywood debut of Gavie Chahal, who previously appeared in Punjabi films. On 3 May 2012, a photography shoot was held with the cast. After release, the film was subject to a copyright dispute after writer Anand Panda lodged a police complaint, backed by the Screenwriters Association, claiming the filmmakers stole his screenplay. Kabir Khan and Aditya Chopra were sent first information reports under charges of cheating, criminal breach of trust, and violation of the Copyright Act. Khan and Chopra subsequently filed an appeal to the Bombay High Court. In July 2012, a legal notice was served by the nephew of Ravindra Kaushik, a RAW agent known as Black Tiger, stating the film bears a striking resemblance to his uncle and his uncle's life.

=== Filming ===
The film's production contained a number of delays. Initial reports said principal photography would begin in July 2011, but a spokesperson for Yash Raj Films announced production had been delayed due to budgeting concerns. Filming began in August 2011 in Dublin, but was postponed after Salman Khan underwent surgery for trigeminal neuralgia in the United States, and when some crew members in Ireland held a demonstration over filming conditions and a lack of payment.

Filming resumed in September 2011 in Turkey, in Istanbul and near the border with Syria and Iraq. There, the crew faced security concerns when they were mistaken for a hostile threat by Turkish Land Forces, and were required to lie down for ten minutes at gunpoint while the issue was being resolved. Production took place in Dublin between 10 September and 14 October 2011, with scenes between Khan and Shorey filmed on Temple Bar. According to Naoise Barry, the Irish Film Commissioner, Screen Ireland and Tourism Ireland collectively sought to attract Bollywood productions to the country since 2004, citing India as an emerging market for tourism in Ireland. According to Aman Agrawal, a production executive for Yash Raj, Dublin was chosen to "allow the film to be international and encourage people outside India to connect to Bollywood" while maintaining "appeal to Indian audiences who love to see new places". Dublin City Council, Trinity College (which saw filming on campus for the first time in 20 years), and other agencies helped enable filming in the city by granting complimentary visas and allowing reduced costs with tax breaks.

Production was halted altogether in early 2012 to account for script re-writes, abandoning production in Hong Kong in favor of an eventual crunch-schedule three-day period in Delhi. Filming ended in June 2012 in Bangkok, Thailand. Stunt directors for The Bourne Identity (2002) coordinated the film's action sequences, some of which were shot on location. Khan used a self-created fitness program titled 'Dirty Running' for 30 days to prepare for the role. Kaif completed her scenes without makeup. Filming also took place in Havana, with the song "Lapaata" shot along the Malecón, the Torreón de la Chorrera, Plaza Vieja, and Havana Cathedral. The film was the first Bollywood film to shoot in Cuba. Khan also appeared in a commercial for both Cuban and Irish tourism companies.

Ek Tha Tiger was shot on film by cinematographer Aseem Mishra using a collection of Arri cameras, including the Arriflex 235, Arriflex 435, and the Arriflex 535, with Angenieux 24-290mm T2.8 and Zeiss Ultra Prime Lenses.

== Music ==
Sohail Sen composed six out of the film's eight-song soundtrack, although the film's end credits song "Mashallah" (and its remix) was composed by Sajid–Wajid. Julius Packiam composed the film score after his previous associations with Khan on Kabul Express (2006) and New York (2009). Neelesh Misra, Anvita Dutt and Kausar Munir wrote the lyrics, and its remixes were produced by Joshilay. The soundtrack was released by YRF Music on 27 June 2012.

== Marketing ==
The film's poster was released in August 2011, and the first theatrical trailer was released in May 2012, debuting alongside the release of Ishaqzaade, another film produced by Yash Raj Films and Aditya Chopra. The trailer received over a million views on video sharing platform YouTube within two days of its release, making it the platform's most-viewed trailer for a Bollywood film at the time. As part of a publicity campaign for Trinity College, parts of the film and behind the scenes footage was shown in India, while interviews of South Asian students, university lecturers, and Ek Tha Tiger crew members were done.

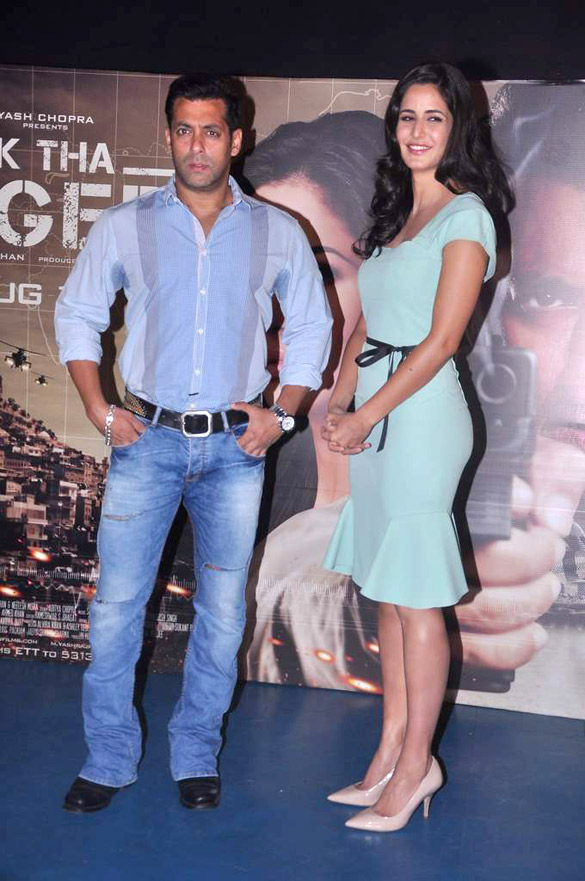
Khan and Kaif promoting the film's lead single, "Mashallah".

The cast embarked on a limited domestic promotional tour, conducting press conferences in New Delhi, Ahmedabad, and Lucknow. They also signed a promotional deal with soft drink company Thums Up, where Khan and Kaif appeared in commercials. The company also sponsored an expanded tour in mid-2012, with the cast also visiting Mumbai, Hyderabad, Kanpur, Allahabad, Agra, Meerut, and Ghaziabad.

Six days after the film's release, Tourism Ireland's Indian Facebook page gained over 23,000 followers, up from 10,000 the previous week; over one year later, it accumulated around 90,000 followers. The Irish Central Statistics Office noted an increase in tourism from overseas after the film's release. In an interview, then-Minister for Transport, Tourism and Sport, Leo Varadkar, said Ek Tha Tiger "established a foundation" for future projects to be held in Ireland.

A two-part comic book series based on the film was also released. Published by Yomics, the series also features characters from Hum Tum (2004), which was also produced by Chopra and Yash Raj Films. Canonically, this sets the two films in one shared universe. The first comic book, Ek Tha Tiger: Mahasagar Ki Suraksha (transl. Ek Tha Tiger: Saving the High Seas), was published in July 2012. The second, Ek Tha Tiger: Web Mein Pakra Gaya! (transl. Ek Tha Tiger: Caught in the Web!), was released in November, to coincide with the film's release on home video. The series received mixed reviews, with praise for its design and criticism for its plot and pacing.

The film's lead single and main theme song, "Mashallah", recorded by Wajid Ali and Shreya Ghoshal, was released worldwide on 27 June 2012. The song's music was both composed and produced by Ali and his brother Sajid, while its lyrics were written by Kausar Munir. The filmi power ballad topped several music charts in India throughout August and remained in the top 10 for a majority of the film's theatrical run.

=== Video games ===
- Ek tha Tiger and Tiger the Bhai, two action mobile video games developed by Zapak, were released as tie-ins for the 2012 film.
- Being SalMan: The Official Game, a 3D action mobile video game developed by Playizzon, was released in 2016. It featured characters portrayed by Khan, including Tiger, Chulbul Pandey from the Dabangg franchise, and Prem Dilwale from Prem Ratan Dhan Payo (2015).

== Release ==
=== Theatrical ===
Ek Tha Tiger was released worldwide on 15 August 2012; the date coincided with Indian Independence Day. The film was screened in 3300 domestic theaters, a record broken by Dabangg 2, which was screened in 3700 theaters later that year. Ek Tha Tiger was released in 550 screens internationally, although, it was not released in Pakistan – a major market for Bollywood – due to concerns over the portrayal of Pakistan in the film. This decision was upheld despite opposition from Kabir Khan, who stated the film does not promote anti-Pakistani sentiment. The film premiered in Tokyo in July 2013, and was screened in 70 theaters in Japan, constituting the widest Japanese release for a Hindi-language Bollywood film. Approximately 60 percent of the film's opening weekend's gross had been collected from ticket pre-orders; Ek Tha Tiger was screened at Cineworld Dublin between 15 August and 3 September 2012 and was often sold out, while other theaters subsequently increased ticket prices.

The film was screened at Trinity College in September 2012, with Kabir Khan discussing its production with film and drama students.

=== Home media ===
Ek Tha Tiger was released on DVD by YRF Home Entertainment on 25 September 2012, and on Blu-ray, Blu-ray 3D, and Ultra HD Blu-ray on 9 October 2012. The digital and Blu-ray releases include behind-the-scenes featurettes, deleted scenes, and a blooper reel. The Blu-ray releases saw the home media introduction of Dolby TrueHD 96k upsampling and Dolby Surround 7.1 sound.

The physical releases in its first week of the sale were one of the top home media releases in India, according to The Numbers data. The Blu-ray version accounted for 79% of the sales, with 3% of total sales coming from the Ultra HD Blu-ray version.

== Reception ==
=== Box office ===
Due to its unprecedented extensive release, combined with many theaters reporting the film's screenings carried over 80% occupancy during its run, Ek Tha Tiger grossed over ₹263 crore (US$49.22 million) in India, and ₹57 crore (US$10.67 million) in other territories, for a worldwide total of ₹320 crore (US$59.88 million). The film had the biggest domestic opening day and opening weekend ever, grossing ₹33.5 crore (US$6.27 million) and ₹57.9 crore (US$10.84 million), respectively. By its fifth day of release, Ek Tha Tiger had earned over ₹100 crore (US$18.71 million) in India, the quickest film to reach this landmark, and broke the previous record of a week held by Bodyguard (2011), which also starred Salman Khan. It is also the highest-grossing Bollywood film of 2012, and became the second highest grossing Bollywood film of all time, after 3 Idiots (2009).

Internationally, Ek Tha Tiger also performed strongly, despite being banned in Pakistan. It grossed ₹36.3 crore (US$6.79 million) in overseas markets in its five days of release. Regionally, the film collected ₹6 crore (US$1.12 million) in Australasia, with an estimated ₹4.3 crore (US$804,676.86) grossed in Australia, and ₹1.7 crore (US$318,128.06) in New Zealand. Additionally, in the United Arab Emirates, a region with a large Pakistani and Indian emigrant population, the film grossed ₹16.5 crore (US$3.09 million), a gross only exceeded by the North America, where Ek Tha Tiger grossed over ₹16.8 crore (US$3.14 million). Another strong performing territory was the United Kingdom, where the film collected over ₹13 crore (US$2.43 million). Its combined overseas gross amounted to ₹57 crore (US$10.67 million), making it one of the highest-grossing Bollywood films by international gross.

=== Critical response ===
On the review aggregator website Rotten Tomatoes, 75% of 16 critics' reviews are positive, with an average rating of 5.9/10.

In India, there was praise for the film's feminist themes, with Marjolaine Gout noting the film is "a roaring, visual, comic feast where the damsel-in-distress fights back", giving Ek Tha Tiger 3.5 out of 5 stars. Anupama Chopra of the Hindustan Times also commended the feminist themes, saying "it's such a pleasure to see a Hindi film heroine not [be] a damsel-in-distress", while also praising the film's action sequences, giving Ek Tha Tiger 3 out of 5 stars. Jahanavi Samant of Mid-Day gave the film the same rating and criticized its tone as being inconsistent, with "Ek Tha Tiger [being] unable to decide whether it is spy action or a love saga". Ronnie Scheib of Variety gave a positive review, praising the performances of the leads and film's production aesthetic, noting "Kaif impresses in her action-heroine debut, while Salman Khan's thinking-on-his-feet immediacy adds depth to his usual macho muscle. Local audiences will no doubt derive a special thrill from the onscreen reunion of stars Khan and Kaif, [with] Aseem Mishra's gorgeous location lensing".

Ek Tha Tiger faced harsher reception from Raja Sen of Rediff, who criticized the film's relative low stakes and pacing, noting "[Kabir] Khan scales down the ambition as he aims for a safe mainstream middle-ground in his Ek Tha Tiger, a spy-thriller which takes a while to get boiling but eventually crackles along quite effectively". He scored the film 2.5 stars out of 5, with his score and reception echoed by Rajeev Masand of CNN-IBN, who wrote "despite flaws, Ek Tha Tiger is extremely far from unwatchable. Just don't go in with very high expectations". Rachel Saltz of The New York Times praised the action scenes but also criticized the low stakes of the characters' romance, saying, "Tiger and Zoya [are] good kung fu street fighters, but unconvincing spies and cookie-cutter bland lovers. Their loyalty to each other is never in question and only tepidly tested". A similar critical reaction was noted by Josh Tuhin of Gulf News who blasted the cinematography, saying "[it] is outright bad, with the body doubles' faces visible during the action scenes", but praised Kaif and Khan's on-screen chemistry.

Regarding the film's depiction of Ireland, Giovanna Rampazzo wrote that despite Ek Tha Tiger presenting political themes, it "carefully avoided representing any complexity or social issues [in favour] of a charming and cosmopolitan Irish capital, constructing a simplistic image of Ireland that requires a minimum of cross-cultural understanding or critical engagement [by] the viewer". She concluded this was "in line with long-standing strategies supported by government agencies to create a marketable version of 'Irishness' [but] may promote unrealistic cognitive associations and expectations about Irish society". Overall, the country's presentation in the film was positively received by Irish audiences.

== Accolades ==
Ceremony	Category	Recipient	Result
2012 People's Choice Awards India	Favourite Movie	Ek Tha Tiger	Won
2012 People's Choice Awards India	Favourite Movie Actor	Salman Khan	Won
2012 People's Choice Awards India	Favourite Movie Actress	Katrina Kaif	Won
2012 People's Choice Awards India	Favourite Action Movie Actor	Salman Khan	Won
2012 People's Choice Awards India	Favourite Song of the Year	"Mashallah"	Won
2012 People's Choice Awards India	Favourite Action Movie	Ek Tha Tiger	Nominated
14th IIFA Awards	Best Special Effects	Ek Tha Tiger	Won
Big Star Entertainment Awards	Best Actress in an Action Role	Katrina Kaif	Won

== Sequels ==
=== Tiger Zinda Hai ===
Ali Abbas Zafar replaced Kabir Khan to direct the sequel, with the screenplay co-written by Zafar and Neelesh Misra. It released in India on 22 December 2017, and saw Salman Khan, Katrina Kaif, Gavie Chahal, and Girish Karnad reprise their roles. Tiger Zinda Hai was Karnad's final Hindi film before his death.

=== Tiger 3 ===
Tiger 3 was directed by Maneesh Sharma and released in India on 12 November 2023. Khan, Kaif, and Chahal reprise their roles, while Emraan Hashmi joined the cast as the primary antagonist. Shah Rukh Khan made a cameo appearance as Pathaan.

== See also ==
- Ravindra Kaushik
