= Khauff Begins... Ringa Ringa Roses =

- Genre: Horror
- Directed by: Maqbool Khan, Govind Agrawal, Kulla Kunjan
- Country of origin: India
- Original language: Hindi
- No. of seasons: 1
- No. of episodes: 16 (list of episodes)

Production
- Producer: Majid Azam
- Production location: India

Original release
- Network: Life OK
- Release: 30 November 2013 – 18 January 2014

Ringa Ringa Roses is an Indian action horror thriller television show that premiered on 30 November 2013. It aired on Life OK on Saturday and Sunday.

The story is about a young girl, Maitri, who believes her father is a superhero who fights against ghosts.

== Cast ==
- Samir Soni as JD, Maitri's father
- Megha Gupta as Aliya, JD's wife and Maitri's mother
- Manoj Verma as Jaffar – Research Specialist
- Rishabh Chaddha as Subbu, a Data analyst
- Abigail Jain as Maria, the Intern
- Roshni Walia as Maitri, the Girl
- Kunal Bhatia as Rohit, the father
- Simran Natekar as Ruhi

== Episode list ==
Episode number	Episode title	Air date
1	Possession	30 November 2013
2	Solar Eclipse	1 December 2013
3	The Documents	7 December 2013
4	Devil Born	8 December 2013
5	The Book of Death	14 December 2013
6	Kaalvriksha	15 December 2013
7	Look Alike	21 December 2013
8	A Wicked Ghost	22 December 2013
9	Spirits of Robbers	28 December 2013
10	The Effigy Ghosts	29 December 2013
11	The Dark Lake	4 January 2014
12	The Stranger	5 January 2014
13	Ouija Board	11 January 2014
14	Room No. – 13	12 January 2014
15	Ragging	18 January 2014
16	The Vision	19 January 2014

== See also ==
- List of Hindi horror shows
