= Pathaan (soundtrack) =

- Soundtrack album cover

Soundtrack album by Vishal–Shekhar, Sanchit Balhara and Ankit Balhara
- Released: 22 December 2022
- Recorded: 2020–2022
- Studios: YRF Studios, Mumbai; YN Music Studio, Dubai; Czech TV Music Studio, Prague
- Genre: Feature film soundtrack
- Length: 11:34
- Language: Hindi
- Label: YRF Music
- Producers: Abhijit Nalani; Meghdeep Bose
External audio
- Audio Jukebox on YouTube

Vishal–Shekhar chronology
Vikram Vedha (2022)	Pathaan (2023)	Fighter (2024)

Sanchit Balhara and Ankit Balhara chronology
Samrat Prithviraj (2022)	Pathaan (2023)	Adipurush (2023)

Singles from Pathaan
- 1. "Besharam Rang" Released: 12 December 2022; 2. "Jhoome Jo Pathaan" Released: 22 December 2022

Pathaan is the soundtrack album composed by Vishal-Shekhar, Sanchit Balhara and Ankit Balhara to the 2023 Hindi film of the same name directed by Siddharth Anand and starring Shah Rukh Khan, Deepika Padukone and John Abraham in lead roles. The film was produced by Aditya Chopra under his banner Yash Raj Films.

Vishal Dadlani and Shekhar Ravjiani composed two songs "Besharam Rang" and "Jhoome Jo Pathaan" with lyrics by Kumaar whereas the original film score was composed by Sanchit Balhara and Ankit Balhara, who also composed "Pathaan's Theme" and "Jim's Theme", instrumentals they had originally recorded for the background score that were released with the soundtrack album on 9 January 2023. Close to the release of the film, two promotional singles: "Pathaan - Trailer" and Arabic version of the song "Jhoome Jo Pathaan" were released.

The songs "Besharam Rang" and "Jhoome Jo Pathaan" were composed with an old-school approach in a modern musical arrangement. The former track has Spanish verses written by Dadlani and marks the celebration of the character played by Padukone in a 'good, bad and flawless' manner, whereas the latter song comprises bassline and dholak-rhythm patterned groove, signifying a 'victory' song in the film.

Upon release, the album received positive reviews by audience and critics. "Besharam Rang" was the only Bollywood song of 2022 to garner more than 100 million views YouTube India in a short span of time.

== Development ==
"The song is a modern fusion of Qawaali and is a celebration of Pathaan's style and panache. It has been a while since we have seen SRK groove to the music and we are hoping that people will love seeing their favourite superstar shake a leg with an attitude to kill for."

- Director Siddharth Anand on the track "Jhoome Jo Pathaan" in an interview with Gulf News

=== Soundtrack album ===
The songs "Besharam Rang" and "Jhoome Jo Pathaan" were conceptualized in the atrium of a building over coffees and casual chats, later, directly recorded in studio. They were recorded during phases one and two of the COVID-19 lockdown in India. Both the songs were attributed to the 'old school' way of compositions.

In an interview with Bollywood Hungama, Dadlani and Ravjiani stated that "Besharam Rang" was recorded first. The song was composed with dummy lyrics and Shilpa Rao recorded the patch. Lyricist Kumaar worked on the words in receipt of her vocals. Dadlani called it an unusual way of working whereas Ravjiani clarified that the song had a different chorus and the hook line being written first was how the song shaped up. On the music arrangement of "Besharam Rang", the duo mentioned that Warren Mendonsa recorded the guitar riffs in New Zealand. Against comparisons with the song "Ghungroo", they clarified that "Besharam Rang" was a "sensual feminine track" and they did not work 'closed room' on it. On coining the title "Besharam Rang", they credited Kumaar who took the brief of the song and translated it. The brief of the lyrics were about 'a girl who by her sheer lack of innovation was incredibly attractive'. Kumaar did not write the tracks but let his ideas be written by Dadlani and Ravjiani.

For the creative process of "Jhoome Jo Pathaan", Vishal-Shekhar roped in their "Swag Se Swagat" music producer Meghdeep Bose to produce the track. In the process Ravjiani sang a line, "Hum Jaise Jigar Waale Kahaan? Aha!" (Translates to "Where are the hearty ones like us?") a qawwali hook-line, requested by Anand prior composing the track. Emphasizing more on the expression "Aha!" that stood as a repetition, Dadlani and Ravjiani continued jamming with these, fitting the verses by Kumaar. Hence, the lyrics "Baat Karte Hai Hazaaron, Hazaaron" came into existence (sung by Sukriti Kakar), the last word of the line either rhyming or repeating. Anand was present during the musical arrangement of the song. Ravjiani was quoted saying, “it is like a modern qawwali kind of zone where there is a repetition of lines". To avoid a generic vocal tone, Dadlani did not record the track, but rather chose Arijit Singh. The track's musical drop was hardly melody, the groove was composed as the drop with bassline and dholak pattern by Bose. The bounce of the groove was recorded as a dance number. Meghdeep Bose also played the Arabic, acoustic and electric guitars on the track.

=== Original score ===
In an interview with B.H. Harsh from Film Companion, Jim's Theme (track 4) was recorded with an 'uncomfortable' percussion sound and reversed for creating an 'untangling effect'. For Pathaan's Theme (track 3), Ankit Balhara created the sound scheme to evoke patriotism as well as a 'heroic flair'. They kept the female vocals (recorded locally) limited, to bring an effect of 'swag' with Khan's introductory scene in the film. Cassandra Cavalli provides the vocals for the theatrical version of Pathaan's Theme. Sanchit Balhara said they drew inspiration from John William's original score for Jurassic Park, apart from scores by James Horner and Thomas Newman. They retained the elements of Indian classical music while fusing and designing the score for Pathaan.

== Critical response ==
Critics based out of Bollywood Hungama called the music in the film of 'a chartbuster variety'. They added that "Besharam Rang" was already a rage and comes into the film at an important juncture. The same goes for "Jhoome Jo Pathaan". They praised the called the background score as 'memorable', especially the theme played during scenes featuring Abraham. Namrata Joshi who reviewed "Besharam Rang" for Cinema Express, praised Shilpa Rao's vocals and compared the inclusion of Spanish vocals with the track "Nashe Si Chadh Gayi" from 2016 Yash Raj film Befikre. Owen Gleiberman of Variety opined "Pathaan isn’t a musical, the music that plays during the action sequences is an overwhelming constant — that EDM Bollywood throb, revving even routine battles to a maximum rush." In her review for The Indian Express, Shubhra Gupta commented, "There really is nothing in it that we haven’t seen before (YRF songs-on-beaches should rightfully be a separate Bollywood sub-genre)". Farzana Patowri of Man's World Magazine summed up: "While "Jhoome Jo Pathaan is an upbeat track, not many are happy with the moves of Padukone and SRK. As soon as the song was released, people started commenting on how they felt about the song. And well, the reactions have been far from good." Tiasa Bhowal of India Today stated: "The song exudes major beach vibes and this one, just like Besharam Rang, is a party number as well. The song is sure to make it to every New Year’s party this year." Renuka Vyawahare of The Times of India noted: "While the background score doesn’t quite feel in sync with the scenarios, the film’s music by Vishal & Shekhar manages to reflect the heroism and bravado on display." Abhimanyu Mathur for DNA India said: "The background music, particularly the theme used for John Abraham, will evoke some whistles in the theatre." Ritika Handoo in her review for Zee News wrote: "Music needs applause and yes here I mean 'Besharam Rang' and 'Jhoome Jo Pathaan' which don't break the rhythm but rather add to it" Nandini Ramnath of Scroll Magazine said "Jhoome Jo Pathaan" that comes towards the end was worth the wait.

English Jagran called the song "Jhoome Jo Pathaan" a mixed bag: a few praises and criticized it as a "stereotypical movie-making culture". Aavish Khan of Asian Sunday Magazine was quoted saying: "While one set the expectations high post "Besharam Rang", the movie's first song, Jhoome Jo Pathaan fails to reach the levels set. The music in the song appears lacklustre while the beats remain energetic. The ‘drop’ in the song, where the song switches to main verse, fails to create the intended impact."

== Commercial performance ==
As per Box Office India - Worldwide report of December 2022, within weeks of release, both the tracks trended number one and two on YouTube. The music of the film increased the expectations of the audience and controversies resulted increased number of reservations made in advance that Pathaan lodged. As per Mid-Day, Indian music critics opined that the songs could not have become even moderately popular if released only as audio tracks. The songs, with their visuals, did wonders, acknowledging film's music more on choreography than the melody.

"Besharam Rang" was the only Bollywood track of 2022 to gather fastest 100 million views on YouTube. The track was a subject of controversy across India, where the right-wing Hindutva groups alleged it to promote obscenity and disrespects to the saffron color. Padukone featured in a saffron bikini in the song. Lyricist Manoj Muntashir, in an interview with Dainik Bhaskar, about Besharam Rang and the saffron color, said, "[...] the music team or Shah Rukh sir could have spotted the error, they would have certainly taken some action." Singer Sona Mohapatra expressed displeasure over the track calling it mediocre. Shilpa Rao, the singer of the track, stated that it was Padukone and Khan's 'chemistry' in the song and that makes it popular. She added that Padukone was 'celebrating herself' in the song – ‘the good, the bad and flawless’ which made her feel 'empowered to sing it'." Rao clarified that the track reached at a stage, where audience picked it up for popularity, followed by promotion, reach, and Instagram reels. She felt the meaning of the song was to 'express yourself without apologies' and to 'love yourself the way you are' and hence, the audience was expressing themselves and thus the popularity. Singer Baba Sehgal recorded a rap cover version of the song. Actress Nia Sharma released a cover video on the track. Actor Mukesh Khanna, called out the Censor Board of Film Certification for clearing "Besharam Rang" without any cuts. He said, "The song can mess up the minds of the youth. You dared to bring people in limited clothing, next you will bring them without clothes."

Upon its release, "Jhoome Jo Pathaan" video on YouTube crossed 5.1 million views and 738K in four hours of release. Also, the song received 1 million views in less than 30 minutes after it was released. The song has received more than 18 million views in the 20 hours after its release. Multiple Indian newspapers and Business Today reported audience to be dancing to the tunes of "Jhoome Jo Pathaan" in front of the theatre screens. When Vishal-Shekhar composed "Jhoome Jo Pathaan", they were confident that the audience would dance to the tunes, especially, reports of audience dancing close to the theatres of the screen. Yashraj Mukhate recreated "Jhoome Jo Pathaan" song fusing the word "Zinda Hai", a dialogue delivered by Khan.

== Track listing ==
The songs "Besharam Rang" and "Jhoome Jo Pathaan" were released as singles in Tamil and Telugu apart from its original Hindi version. The theme tracks have gibberish, sparing English vocals and instrumental interludes released with the soundtrack album. "Pathaan - Trailer" with vocals by Shah Rukh Khan and an Arabic version of the song "Jhoome Jo Pathaan" were released as promotional singles.

"Besharam Rang" was released on 12 December 2022, whereas "Jhoome Jo Pathaan" was released on 22 December 2022. The soundtrack in its entirety was released on 9 January 2023.

=== Original ===
Pathaan (Original Motion Picture Soundtrack)
No.	Title	Lyrics	Music	Singer(s)	Length
1.	"Besharam Rang"	Kumaar, Vishal Dadlani (Spanish)	Vishal–Shekhar	Shilpa Rao, Caralisa Monteiro	4:18
2.	"Jhoome Jo Pathaan"	Kumaar	Vishal–Shekhar	Arijit Singh, Sukriti Kakar	3:28
3.	"Pathaan's Theme"	Kit Bee	Sanchit and Ankit Balhara	Magdalena Supel, Cassandra Cavalli	2:37
4.	"Jim's Theme"	Instrumental	Sanchit and Ankit Balhara	Maanya Narang, Riya Duggal	1:11
Total length:					11:34

Promotional single
No.	Title	Lyrics	Music	Singer(s)	Length
1.	"Jhoome Jo Pathaan" (Arabic)	Jalal Hamdaoui	Vishal–Shekhar	Abd El Fattah Grini, Jamila El Badaoui	3:28

Extended Soundtrack
No.	Title	Lyrics	Music	Singer(s)	Length
1.	"Pathaan - Teaser"	Instrumental	Sanchit and Ankit Balhara	Instrumental	1:25
2.	"Pathaan x Tiger Theme"	Instrumental	Sanchit and Ankit Balhara, Julius Packiam (Tiger's Theme)	Sanchit Balhara, Ankit Balhara, Riya Duggal	2:35
Total length:					4:00

=== Tamil ===
Pathaan (Tamil) [Original Motion Picture Soundtrack]
No.	Title	Lyrics	Music	Singer(s)	Length
1.	"Azhaiyaa Mazhai"	Madhan Karky, Vishal Dadlani (Spanish)	Vishal–Shekhar	Shilpa Rao, Caralisa Monteiro	4:18
2.	"Zoom Boom Doom Pathaan"	Madhan Karky	Vishal–Shekhar	Haricharan, Sunitha Sarathy	3:28
3.	"Pathaan's Theme"	Kit Bee	Sanchit and Ankit Balhara	Magdalena Supel, Cassandra Cavalli (theatrical version)	2:37
4.	"Jim's Theme"	Instrumental	Sanchit and Ankit Balhara	Maanya Narang, Riya Duggal	1:11
Total length:					11:34

=== Telugu ===
Pathaan (Telugu) [Original Motion Picture Soundtrack]
No.	Title	Lyrics	Music	Singer(s)	Length
1.	"Naa Nijam Rangu"	Chaitanya Prasad, Vishal Dadlani (Spanish)	Vishal–Shekhar	Shilpa Rao, Caralisa Monteiro	4:18
2.	"Kummese Pathaan"	Chaitanya Prasad	Vishal–Shekhar	Haricharan, Sunitha Sarathy	3:28
3.	"Pathaan's Theme"	Kit Bee	Sanchit and Ankit Balhara	Magdalena Supel, Cassandra Cavalli (theatrical version)	2:37
4.	"Jim's Theme"	Instrumental	Sanchit and Ankit Balhara	Maanya Narang, Riya Duggal	1:11
Total length:					11:34

== Album credits ==
Credits adapted from liner notes of the official audio released by YRF Music on YouTube.

Soundtrack album composed by Vishal–Shekhar and original score by Sanchit Balhara, Ankit Balhara. All tracks were mastered at Hafod Mastering, Wales, UK

- Kumaar - Lyrics (Track 1, 2)
- Vishal Dadlani - Spanish Lyrics (Track 1)
- Sanchit Balhara - Arrangement, production (Track 3, 4)
- Ankit Balhara - Arrangement, production (Track 3, 4)
- Mohammed Esmat - Vocal supervision (Promotional single)
- Shannon Donald - Backing vocals (Track 3)
- Anubha Kaul - Backing vocals (Track 3)
- Gwen Fernandes - Backing vocals (Track 3)
- Kamakshi Khanna - Backing vocals (Track 3)
- Abhijit Nalani - Production and music arrangement (Track 1), Song Programming (Track 1)
- Meghdeep Bose - Production and music arrangement (Track 2), Guitar (Track 2)
- Abhishek Khandelwal - Recording Musician (Track 1, 2), Mixing (Track 1, Promotional single)
- Chinmay Mestry - Recording Musician (Track 1, 2)
- Dileep Nair - Recording Musician (Track 1, 2), Assistant Mixing Engineer (Track 1)
- Gethin John - Mastering Engineer (Track 1, 2) at Hafod Mastering, Wales UK
- Prathamesh Chande - Song Editor (Track 1)
- Warren Mendonsa - Guitar (Track 1)
- Adele Pereira - Song editor (Track 2)
- Abhishek Ghatak - Mixing (Track 3, 4)
- Paresh Kamath - Guitar (Track 3, 4)
- Samarth Srinivasan - Strings and Brass (Track 3, 4)
- Srikant Krishna - Additional Orchestration (Track 3, 4)
- Adam Klemens - Score Conductor (Track 3, 4)
- Milan Jílek - Sound Engineer (Track 3, 4)
- Michal Petrásek - Assistant Engineer (Track 3, 4)
- Pavel Ciboch - Librarian (Track 3, 4)
- Petr Pýcha - Music Contractor and Recording Manager (MUSA Prague) [Track 3, 4]
- Samiran Das - Music Editing and Additional Production (Track 3, 4)
- Samarth Srinivasan - Sheet Music Preparation and Live Recording Editing (Track 3, 4)
- Srikant Krishna - Sheet Music Preparation and Live Recording Editing (Track 3, 4)
- Abhinav Menon - Live Recording Editing (Track 3, 4)
