= Jhoome Jo Pathaan =

- Official song cover

Single by Arijit Singh and Sukriti Kakar

from the album Pathaan
- Language: Hindi
- Released: 22 December 2022
- Recorded: 2020–2022
- Studio: YRF Studios, Mumbai
- Genre: Dance; pop; Western classical
- Length: 3:28
- Label: YRF Music
- Composer: Vishal–Shekhar
- Lyricist: Kumaar
- Producer: Meghdeep Bose

Pathaan track listing
- 1. "Besharam Rang"; 2. "Jhoome Jo Pathaan"; 3. "Pathaan's Theme"; 4. "Jim's Theme"

Music video
- "Jhoome Jo Pathaan" on YouTube

"Jhoome Jo Pathaan" is an Indian Hindi-language song, composed by the duo of Vishal–Shekhar (Vishal Dadlani and Shekhar Ravjiani), with lyrics written by Kumaar and sung by Arijit Singh and Sukriti Kakar for the soundtrack album of the 2023 Indian film Pathaan. It was released on 22 December 2022 as the second single from the album, through YRF Music. "Jhoome Jo Pathaan" was composed with an old-school approach in a modern musical arrangement.

The song was also released in Tamil as "Zoom Boom Doom Pathaan" and in Telugu as "Kummese Pathaan". Later, the song was dubbed and released in Arabic version. Upon release, the song received positive reviews by audience and critics. The hook step, performed by Shah Rukh Khan and Deepika Padukone, went viral on social media. Arijit Singh's vocal performance was praised by critics and audiences and she won the Zee Cine Award for Best Playback Singer – Male.

== Composition ==
"The song is a modern fusion of Qawaali and is a celebration of Pathaan's style and panache. It has been a while since we have seen SRK groove to the music and we are hoping that people will love seeing their favourite superstar shake a leg with an attitude to kill for."

- In an interview with Gulf News, director Siddharth Anand on the track.

"Jhoome Jo Pathaan was conceptualized in the atrium of a building over coffees and casual chats, later being directly recorded in the studio. The song recorded during first two phases of the COVID-19 lockdown in India. The song was attributed to the 'old school' way of compositions. Siddharth Anand said that the song is a tribute to Pathaan character. "Jhoome Jo Pathaan is an ode to the spirit of Pathaan, played by the inimitable Shah Rukh Khan. The song embodies the personality traits of this super spy Pathaan who has irresistible swagger that is infectious. His energy, his vibe, his confidence can make anyone dance to tunes," he added.

For the creative process of "Jhoome Jo Pathaan", Vishal-Shekhar roped in their "Swag Se Swagat" music producer Meghdeep Bose to produce the track. In the process Ravjiani sang a line, "Hum Jaise Jigar Waale Kahaan? Aha!" (Translates to "Where are the hearty ones like us?") a qawwali hook-line, requested by Anand prior composing the track. Emphasizing more on the expression "Aha!" that stood as a repetition. Dadlani and Ravjiani continued jamming with these, fitting the verses by Kumaar. Hence, one can hear the lyrics "Baat Karte Hai Hazaaron, Hazaaron" (sung by Sukriti Kakar) the last word of the line, rhyming or repeating. Anand was present during the musical arrangement of the song. Ravjiani was quoted saying, "it is like a modern qawwali kind of zone where there are repeat of lines". To avoid generic vocal tone, Dadlani did not record the track rather chose Arijit Singh. Anand also had plans to sing this track by Singh. The song marks first collaboration of Sukriti Kakar with both Vishal–Shekhar and Arijit Singh. The track's musical drop was hardly melody, the groove was composed as the drop with bassline and dholak pattern by Bose. The bounce of the groove was recorded as a dance number. Meghdeep Bose played the Arabic, acoustic and electric guitars on the track.

About singing the song, Sukriti Kakar said "To be a part of this amazing song Jhoome Jo Pathaan is nothing short of a dream come true. I really couldn't contain my happiness when I first came to know that I will be getting the opportunity to be a part of something so big! It is truly an amazing way to end the year. The song is an extremely lively and power-packed track and I really hope that the audience will love it."

== Release ==
After the controversial success of the first single "Besharam Rang", the fans were highly anticipated for the second single. A still of the featuring Khan and Padukone was released by the makers on 20 December 2022. The second single titled "Jhoome Jo Pathaan" was released on 22 December 2022, through YRF Music.

== Music video ==
The music video features Shah Rukh Khan and Deepika Padukone. It was choreographed by the duo Bosco–Caesar. The music video was shot at Andalucian in Spain for 4 days, in late-August 2021. Before the song shoot, Khan and Padukone done the rehearsals for the song at midnight everyday, after the pack-up of film shoot. Bosco said that Khan had knee pain while filming the song, but Khan never complained or refused to do any of the choreographed steps. Khan said that it was very embarrassing for him to show his abs in the music video. Making of music video was released by the makers on 15 February 2023. About creating the hook-step for the song, Bosco said, "My team came up with a lot of hook steps and I think eventually we cracked something that’s universally achievable and that was the best part of it."

== Critical reception ==
Critics based out of Bollywood Hungama wrote the song "was already a rage and comes into the film at an important juncture". Farzana Patowri of Man's World Magazine summed up: "While Jhoome Jo Pathaan is an upbeat track, not many are happy with the moves of Padukone and SRK. As soon as the song was released, people started commenting on how they felt about the song. And well, the reactions have been far from good."

Nandini Ramnath of Scroll Magazine said "Jhoome Jo Pathaan" that comes towards the end was worth the wait. English Jagran called the song "Jhoome Jo Pathaan" a mixed bag: a few praises and criticized it as a "stereotypical movie-making culture".

A Firstpost critic wrote "In the mesmerising voice of Arjit Singh and the smart composition of Vishal-Sheykhar, Jhoome Jo Pathaan exhibits the impeccable chemistry between SRK and Deepika. Decked in their stylish best, SRK and Deepika can be seen bringing street-style fashion back on the radar." Stating "this one will make you dance like there's no tomorrow", Zinia Bandyopadhyay of India Today wrote "The song has major Swag Se Swagat vibes and it is almost impossible to not remember the song from Tiger Zinda Hai when you watch it."

A critic of India TV wrote "Shah Rukh Khan is seen flaunting his long hair, chiseled physique and perfect abs. SRK, who plays a gun-toting spy with a licence to kill in 'Pathaan', is presented as the king of cool in the song. He looks no less than a treat for sore eyes. Deepika too matched his energy and charisma. In the video, the two Bollywood stars can be seen dancing atop a bus at an exotic foreign location. Dancing behind them are hundreds of dancers. The peppy beats soon catch up and you won't mind listening or rather watching the song on a loop." The Telegraph wrote "Sung by Arijit Singh, Sukriti Kakar and Vishal and Sheykhar, Jhoome Jo Pathaan, which starts with a Spanish guitar riff, shows a ripped Shah Rukh Khan tapping his foot to music. With his abs on full display, Shah Rukh also does his iconic pose throughout the song."

== Live performances ==
Arijit Singh performed the song at a concert at Pune in January 2023. Vishal Dadlani performed the song at India's Best Dancer season 3.

== Charts ==
Chart performances for "Jhoome Jo Pathaan"
Chart (2023)	Peak position
India (Billboard) Jhoome Jo Pathaan	5

== Impact ==
The song received positive reception from audiences, praising the music. The song started trending within hours of its release. The song became an instant chartbuster. As per Box Office India - Worldwide report of December 2022, within weeks of release, the track trended number one on YouTube. Upon its release, "Jhoome Jo Pathaan" video on YouTube crossed 5.1 million views and 738K in four hours of release. Also, the song received 1 million views in less than 30 minutes after it was released. The song has received more than 18 million views in the 20 hours after its release.

The hook step, performed by Shah Rukh Khan and Deepika Padukone, went viral on social media. Many recreated the hook-step and posted at social media platforms. Multiple Indian newspapers reported audience to be dancing to the tunes of "Jhoome Jo Pathaan" in front of the theatre screens. News18 wrote "This trend is not limited only to Indian cities and is catching up on with the global audience as well." Khan performed the hook step at several events post its success.

Amul released a doodle inspired by the song to celebrate its success. Musician Yashraj Mukhate recreated the song fusing the word "Zinda Hai", a dialogue delivered by Khan. Ranveer Singh, Varun Dhawan, Virat Kohli, Ravindra Jadeja, Shreyas Iyer too recreated the hook-step.

== Accolades ==
Award (Note: Awards, festivals and organizations are in Alphabetical order.)	Date of ceremony (Note: Date is linked to the article about the awards held that year, wherever possible.)	Category	Recipient(s)	Result	Ref.
Filmfare Awards	27 January 2024	Best Choreography	Bosco–Caesar	Nominated	
Zee Cine Awards	10 March 2024	Best Playback Singer – Male	Arijit Singh	Won	
Bollywood Hungama OTT India Fest	18 October 2023	Most Vivacious Musical Duo	Sukriti Kakar (shared with Prakriti Kakar	Won	
