= Music of Bandish Bandits series =

Soundtrack albums

The music for the musical romantic drama television series Bandish Bandits created by Amritpal Singh Bindra and Anand Tiwari for Amazon Prime Video featured two soundtracks for two seasons. The first season featured music composed by the trio Shankar–Ehsaan–Loy and released under Sony Music India label on 27 July 2020, while the second season featured music by multiple composers, and released through T-Series on 21 November 2024.

== Season 1 ==
Bandish Bandits (Season 1)

Soundtrack album by Shankar–Ehsaan–Loy
- Released: 27 July 2020
- Recorded: 2019
- Genre: Amazon Original Series Soundtrack
- Length: 35:11
- Language: Hindi
- Label: Sony Music India

Shankar–Ehsaan–Loy chronology
Panga (2020)	Bandish Bandits (Season 1) (2020)	Bunty Aur Babli 2 (2021)
External audio
- Official Audio Jukebox on YouTube

=== Development ===
The trio Shankar–Ehsaan–Loy were announced as the composer for the series in February 2019. Bandish Bandits was their maiden composition for a web series. Owing to the musical premise, the composers created a variety of songs such as bandish, thumri, tarana, dohas, as well as classical, folk, pop, electronic and instrumental songs providing a blend of tradition and contemporary.

The trio added that they had got chances to work on classical and semi-classical music, as Shankar Mahadevan being trained with Hindustani and Carnatic music traditions, while Ehsaan Noorani's understanding of western music being a guitarist and Loy Mendonsa's abilities as a multi-instrumentalist helped in synchronizing the variety of music. They collaborated with Rajasthani folk musicians for working on the songs. The composer trio worked on the songs even before lockdown as they had pre-recorded all the musical pieces before filming owing to its role in the narrative. The album was released on 27 July 2020.

=== Reception ===
The soundtrack album received positive response from critics. Devarsi Ghosh of Scroll.in opined that "The blend of easy-listening pop and soaring semi-classical tunes brings to mind the trio's vast body of work". Baradwaj Rangan of Film Companion praised the album as a "magnificent east-meets-west soundtrack". Karthik Srinivasan of Milliblog hailed as "one of the best soundtracks in Hindi in recent times" calling it an "effortless encore" of their classical compositions for Katyar Kaljat Ghusali (2015). Vipin Nair of Music Aloud reviewed as "a solid piece of work, despite noty being an extraordinary work by the trio (Shankar Mahadevan, Ehsaan Noorani and Loy Mendonsa), when it comes to classical fusion".

=== Track listing ===
No.	Title	Lyrics	Singer(s)	Length
1.	"Sajan Bin"	Divyanshu Malhotra	Shivam Mahadevan, Jonita Gandhi	3:14
2.	"Chedkhaniyaan"	Tanishk S Nabar	Shivam Mahadevan, Pratibha Singh Baghel	3:18
3.	"Couple Goals"	Tanishk S Nabar	Armaan Malik, Jonita Gandhi	2:36
4.	"Labb Par Aaye"	Sameer Samant	Javed Ali	3:47
5.	"Virah"	Sameer Samant	Shankar Mahadevan	3:00
6.	"Dhara Hogi"	Sameer Samant	Shankar Mahadevan	4:21
7.	"Garaj Garaj Jugalbandi"	Sameer Samant	Farid Hasan, Mohammed Aman	5:30
8.	"Mastiyaapa"	Tanishk S Nabar	Jonita Gandhi	3:22
9.	"Garaj Garaj"	Sameer Samant	Pandit Ajoy Chakraborty	2:38
10.	"Padharo Maare Des"	Traditional	Shankar Mahadevan	2:20
11.	"Bandish Bandits Theme"	Traditional	Shankar Mahadevan, Mame Khan, Ravi Mishra	1:05
12.	"Lat Uljhi Suljha Baalama"	Traditional	Shreeya Sondur	1:55
Total length:				35:11

=== Accolades ===
Award	Date of ceremony	Category	Nominee	Result	Ref.
Filmfare OTT Awards	19 December 2021	Best Original Soundtrack (Series)	Shankar–Ehsaan–Loy	Nominated	
Filmfare OTT Awards	19 December 2021	Best Background Score (Series)	Souumil Shringarpure	Nominated	

== Season 2 ==
Bandish Bandits (Season 2)

Soundtrack album by Shankar–Ehsaan–Loy, OAFF–Savera, Meghdeep Bose, Siddharth Pandit, Ana Rehman, Souumil Shringarpure, Siddharth Mahadevan, Prithvi Gandharv, Amit Sharma, DigV
- Released: 21 November 2024
- Recorded: 2023–2024
- Genre: Amazon Original Series Soundtrack
- Length: 1:06:08
- Language: Hindi
- Label: T-Series
External audio
- Official Audio Jukebox on YouTube

=== Development ===
Shankar–Ehsaan–Loy, however did not return to the second season, though two of their songs from the first season were re-used and modified. Akashdeep Sengupta composed the musical score and supervised and curated the 17-track album. Sengupta added that the trio had blessed him on working on the project, who added that they had an 18 month duration to create the entire album. The second season had a different premise focusing on the battle of the bands between the East and West thereby blending Indian classical and Western contemporary music. He added a lot of attention went on developing the album and involved a variety of composers to provide a color, style and diversity to the sounds.

OAFF–Savera, Meghdeep Bose, Siddharth Pandit, Ana Rehman, Souumil Shringarpure, Siddharth Mahadevan, Prithvi Gandharv, Amit Sharma and DigV were enlisted to create individual songs while maintaining a unified sound to the album. The artists worked on the same recording studio to ensure real-time interaction and an immersive listening experience, while adding that the sound engineers and producers had a crucial role in editing the sessions into "cohesive, harmonious pieces". The season also included callbacks from the songs from the previous season, though managed it with different arrangements and instrumentation. The soundtrack was released on 21 November 2024.

=== Reception ===
Deepa Gahlot of Rediff.com wrote "In the end, music is the saving grace, and the singers deserve all credit." Suchin Mehrotra of The Hollywood Reporter India wrote "while it isn’t Shankar-Ehsaan-Loy behind the album this time, music supervisor Akashdeep Sengupta and his armada of talented composers step up to the plate admirably and deliver another foot-tapping, soulful soundtrack." Saibal Chatterjee of NDTV "The music of Bandit Bandish S2—one pivotal number is drawn from what Shankar-Ehsaan-Loy composed for Season 1—is undeniably brilliant". Zinia Bandyopadhyay of India Today claimed that the second season's oundtrack "soars notches higher" than the first season while further adding "be it the composers or the singers, every track harmoniously fits into the narrative while standing out in itself". Sugandha Rawal of Hindustan Times wrote "The musical contributions are noteworthy and recapture the enchanting melodies that made the first chapter memorable."

=== Track listing ===
No.	Title	Lyrics	Music	Singer(s)	Length
1.	"Ghar Aa Maahi"	Shubham Shirule	Ana Rehman	Nikhita Gandhi, Ankkit Singh, Suvarna Tiwari	2:55
2.	"Holdin' On"	Shloke Lal	OAFF–Savera	Pratika Gopinath, Savera	3:29
3.	"Hichki 2.0"	Alok Ranjan Srivastava	Siddharth Pandit	Swaroop Khan, Poorvi Koutish	3:37
4.	"Khaamakha"	Alok Ranjan Srivastava	Siddharth Pandit	Nikhita Gandhi	4:32
5.	"Sur Hi Parmatma"	Sameer Samant	Souumil Shringarpure, Siddharth Mahadevan	Shankar Mahadevan	4:06
6.	"Ghar Aa Maahi (I'm Waiting For You)"	Shubham Shirule	Ana Rehman	Nikhita Gandhi, Ana Rehman, Shubham Shirule, Ankkit Singh, Suvarna Tiwari	4:47
7.	"Nirmohiya"	Mandy Gill	Prithvi Gandharv	Prithvi Gandharv, Suvarna Tiwari	4:38
8.	"Yeh Raat"	Shubham Shirule	Ana Rehman	Asees Kaur, Akashdeep Sengupta	5:23
9.	"Yaahin Rahio Sa"	Traditional	Amit Sharma	Prithvi Gandharv, Suvarna Tiwari	3:45
10.	"Sakhi Mori"	Traditional	DigV	DigV, Sparsh Agarwal	3:46
11.	"Saawan Mohe Tarasaaye"	Sameer Samant	Souumil Shringarpure, Siddharth Mahadevan	Ankita Joshi, Krishna Bongane	4:37
12.	"Bebaqiyaan"	Nashra	Meghdeep Bose	Nikhita Gandhi, Yashaswini Dayama	4:31
13.	"Araj"	Traditional	DigV	Ronkini Gupta, Arshad Ali Khan, Akashdeep Sengupta, Ankkit Singh	3:55
14.	"Garaj Garaj" (Rock)	Sameer Samant	Shankar–Ehsaan–Loy, Souumil Shringarpure	Souumil Shringarpure, Dhananjay Mhaskar	3:37
15.	"You and I"	Jhalli	Souumil Shringarpure	Jhalli, Souumil Shringarpure	3:11
16.	"You and I" (Lofi)	Jhalli	Souumil Shringarpure	Jhalli, Souumil Shringarpure	2:31
17.	"Jheeni Jheeni" (Rock)	Sant Kabir	Shankar–Ehsaan–Loy, Souumil Shringarpure	Souumil Shringarpure	2:48
Total length:					1:06:08

=== Accolades ===
Award	Date of ceremony	Category	Nominee	Result	Ref.
Filmfare OTT Awards	26 November 2023	Best Music Album (Series)	Shankar–Ehsaan–Loy, OAFF–Savera, Meghdeep Bose, Siddharth Pandit, Ana Rehman, Souumil Shringarpure, Siddharth Mahadevan, Prithvi Gandharv, Amit Sharma, DigV	Won	
Filmfare OTT Awards	26 November 2023	Best Background Score (Series)	Akashdeep Sengupta	Nominated	
