= Meghdeep Bose =

Indian Music Producer

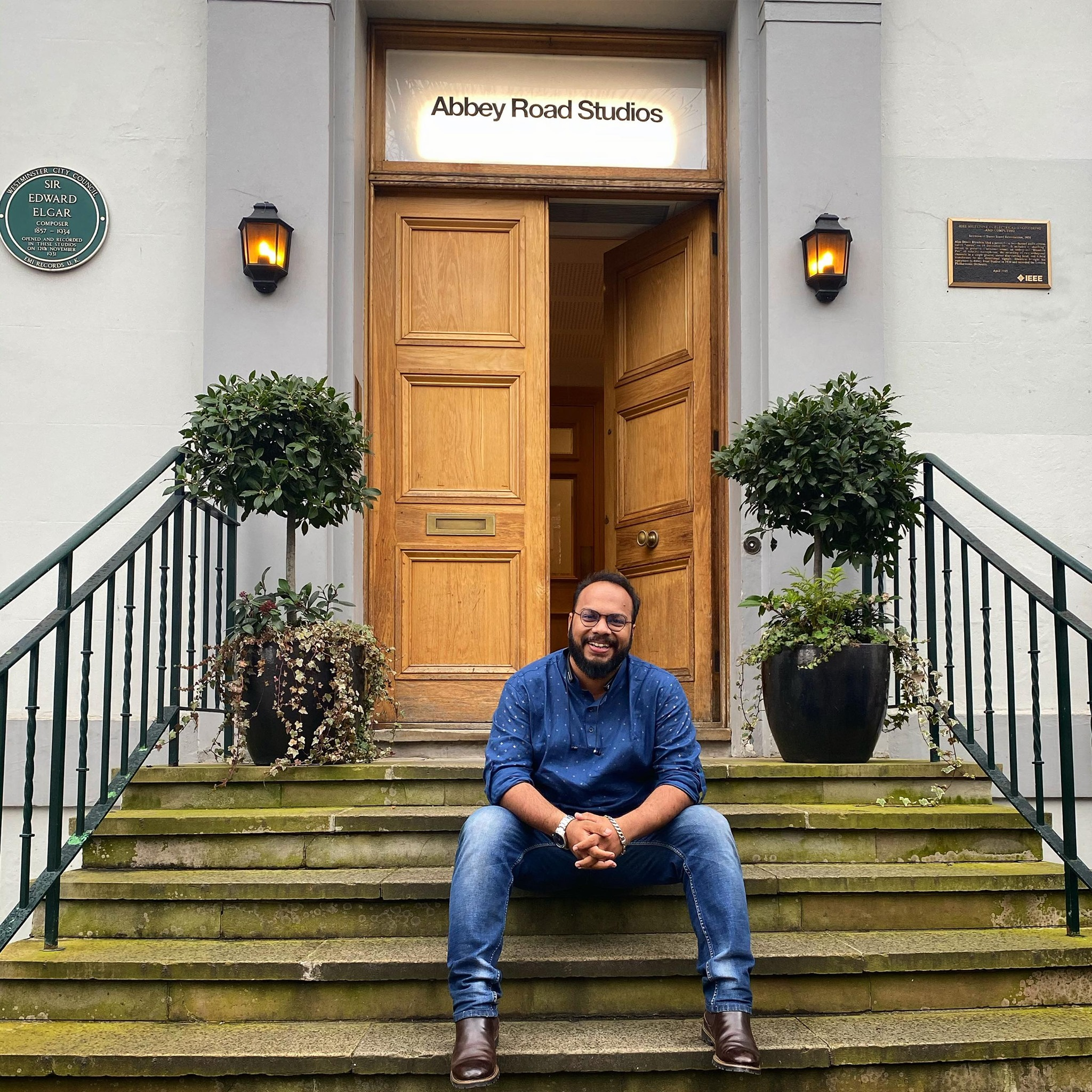
- Bose, after a session at Abbey Road Studios, London.
- Born: Indore, Madhya Pradesh, India
- Occupations: Film music composer, arranger, record producer, singer, multi-instrumentalist
- Years active: 2013–present
- Parents: Dilip Bose (father); Shraddha Bose (mother)

Meghdeep Bose is an Indian music producer, composer, arranger and singer.

His works include songs Dooron Dooron, Paan Ki Dukaan, Panwadi, What Jhumka?, Swag Se Swagat, Jhoome Jo Pathaan, Khairiyat and film scores including O'Romeo, Brahmastra.

== Early life ==
Meghdeep was born in Indore, Madhya Pradesh, to father Dilip Bose and mother Shraddha Bose. Being born in a family of four generation of musicians, Meghdeep took to music at an early age. He spent most of his childhood in the studios, observing his father as he composed & produced music for various devotional projects

== Career ==
Meghdeep began his career under his father while assisting him on various Projects.

Bose initially trained under his father Dilip Bose (the first independent music producer of central India). Meghdeep later on received training in western classical piano from Fr. Charles Vas (Trinity Guildhall Curriculum). Bose trained as a vocalist of Rabindra Sangeet under Madhuri Mukherjee and learnt tabla by Pt. Kiran Deshpande

In 2012, Meghdeep was selected for Berklee College of Music, Boston. However, due to financial constraints, he couldn't make it and instead moved to Mumbai and joined music composer Raju Singh and went on to be his apprentice for the next few years.

In the next few years Meghdeep was commissioned by various composers and artists including Vishal–Shekhar, Shankar–Ehsaan–Loy, Pritam, Salim–Sulaiman, Amit Trivedi, Clinton Cerejo, Mikey McCleary, A Sivamani, Stephen Devassy, Arjun Janya etc.

In 2015 Amaal Malik overheard Meghdeep's work at YRF Studios, Mumbai and offered him to collaborate on the song "Main Hoon Hero Tera".

After collaborating in Tiger Zinda Hai for the song "Swag Se Swagat", Vishal–Shekhar teamed up with Bose for their songs in the 2018 Telugu film Naa Peru Surya.

On 8 August 2019, Amaal Mallik & Meghdeep Bose became the second Indian composer-arranger to perform with the Melbourne Symphony Orchestra. composer A. R. Rahman was the only Indian composer before this to have collaborated with this orchestra.

"Bose has been working with various philharmonic orchestras for film songs and scores he produces/arranges. In 2018, AR Rahman commissioned him with two songs to arrange in an orchestral format, which were later performed by the Grand Philharmonic Orchestra from London".

Artists like A. R. Rahman, Yanni, Quincy Jones, Salim–Sulaiman and Shankar–Ehsaan–Loy have had a considerable influence on Bose's music.

== Film, TV and other works ==
Bose is an active music producer in the Indian film industry.

Bose's recent film projects include songs of Pathaan & Vikram-Vedha with Vishal-Shekhar and Songs of Rocky Aur Raani Kii Prem Kahaani and Tu Jhoothi Main Makkar and score of Brahmāstra: Part One – Shiva (as co-composer) with Pritam.

His other projects include a few of his own independent singles and an album "Main Tera" in collaboration with Azaan Sami Khan.

In 2024, Bose was commissioned to compose songs for the comeback album of A Band Of Boys (named A Band of Boys - Reignite), where in he composed three songs for the album. The album audio was released in August 2024.

Further Bose was commissioned to compose a song "Bebaqiyaan" for Bandish Bandits Season 2. The music released on 21 November 2024.

In 2025 Himesh Reshammiya brought Bose on board to arrange & produce songs for his comeback venture Badass Ravikumar. Further Bose was commissioned by Pritam to produce songs for the film Sikandar.

Having collaborated for the film Welcome Home (2020), filmmaker Pushkar Mahabal roped in Bose to compose for his next directorial venture Black, White & Gray - Love Kills, a mockumentary styled series, released in May 2025 on SonyLIV.

In 2025, Filmmaker Composer Vishal Bhardwaj roped in Bose to produce songs & score for his magnum opus O'Romeo.

=== Selected film songs as a music arranger and producer ===
Year	Song(s)	Film title	Music composer / Artist
2026	Paan Ki Dukaan; Aashiqon Ki Colony; Ishq Ka Fever; O'Romeo; Vaada Hai; Hum To Tere Hi Liye The (Choir); O'Romeo Lo-fi; Vaada Hai (Reprise); Paan Ki Dukaan (Club Mix); Hum To Tere Hi Liye The (Reprise)	O'Romeo	Vishal Bhardwaj
2026	Maatrubhumi	Battle of Galwan	Himesh Reshammiya
2025	Aap Is Dhoop Mein	Gustaakh Ishq	Vishal Bhardwaj
2025	Panwadi	Sunny Sanskari Ki Tulsi Kumari	A.P.S
2025	Jeete Jeete	War 2	Pritam
2025	Dil Ka Kya- Yaad	Metro... In Dino	Pritam
2025	Tandoori Days; Hookstep Hookahbar; Aaj Mehfil Mein; Aajaa Piyaa; Aajaa Aajaa Pardesi; Chaand Baaliyaan	Badass Ravikumar	Himesh Reshammiya
2025	Sikandar Naache; Taikhaane Mein	Sikandar	Pritam
2024	Vande Mataram (The Fighter Anthem)	Fighter	Vishal-Shekhar
2023	Banda; Lut Put	Dunki	Pritam
2023	Ki Farak Paina Hai; Saahiba	The Great Indian Family	Pritam
2023	– What Jhumka? – Hearthrob – Kudmayi (Film Version)	Rocky Aur Raani Kii Prem Kahaani	Pritam
2023	– Pyaar Hota Kayi Baar – Maine Pi Rakhi Hai	Tu Jhoothi Main Makkar	Pritam
2023	Jhoome Jo Pathaan	Pathaan	Vishal-Shekhar
2022	Kala Jadu	Freddy	Pritam
2022	– Alcoholia – O Sahiba	Vikram Vedha	Vishal-Shekhar
2022	– Mohabbat – Mind Your Business	36 Farmhouse	Subhash Ghai
2021	Lehra Do (Film Version)	83	Pritam
2021	– Hoye Ishq Na – Ae Dila Marjaniya	Tadap	Pritam
2021	Tum Aogey	Bell Bottom	Amaal Mallik
2021	– Chal Wahin Chale – Parinda – Main Hoon Na Tere Saath	Saina	Amaal Mallik
2020	Shivali	AK vs AK	Alokananda Dasgupta
2020	– Ghoom Charkhya (Co-Produced with Sneha Khanwalkar) – Aadhe (Additional Strings Arrangement)	Raat Akeli Hai	Sneha Khanwalkar
2020	Dus Bahane 2.0	Baaghi 3	Vishal–Shekhar
2020	Dil Ne Kaha	Panga	Shankar–Ehsaan–Loy
2019	Sarkar	Motichoor Chaknachoor	
2019	Pink Gulabi Sky	The Sky Is Pink	Pritam
2019	Khairiyat (Co-Produced with Sunny MR)	Chhichhore	Pritam
2019	– Ashwini – Title Song	Ye Re Ye Re Paisa	Troy-Arif
2019	– Haye Dil – Balma Bhagoda	Parey Hut Love	Azaan Sami
2019	Fakeera	Student of the Year 2	Vishal–Shekhar
2019	– Slow Motion, – Aetthe Aa (both Versions), – Aya Na tu	Bharat	Vishal–Shekhar
2019	Jind Saan	Wrong No. 2	Simaab Sen
2019	– Saugandh Mujhe is Mitti ki, – Hindustani – Fakeera	P. M. Narendra Modi	Shashi-Khushi
2019	Tu Mila to hai na	De De Pyaar De	Amaal Mallik
2018	– Qafirana – Jaan Nisaar	Kedarnath	Amit Trivedi
2018	– Yaadon ki Almari – Dooba Dooba	Helicopter Eela	Amit Trivedi
2018	Pappi	Banned	Utsav Nanda
2018	Title Track	Chacha Vidhayak Hain Hamare	Vishal Dadlani
2018	– Sainika, – Beautiful – Maya – Janmashtami	Naa Peru Surya	Vishal–Shekhar
2018	– Challa Chhaap ri Chunariya – Raat Yun Dil Mein	Daas Dev	Sandesh Shandilya
2018	Tu Te Main	Golak Bugni Bank Te Batua	Jatinder Shah
2018	Title Track	Hichki	Jasleen Royal
2017	– Swag Se Swagat – Daata Tu	Tiger Zinda Hai	Vishal–Shekhar
2017	Bahut Hua Samman	Mukkabaaz	Rachita Arora
2017	Tere bin O Yara	FU Friendship Unlimited	Vishal Mishra
2017	Uff Ye Noor	Noor	Amaal Mallik
2016	– Besabriyaan, – Kaun Tujhe – Jab Tak	M.S. Dhoni: The Untold Story	Amaal Mallik
2016	Kuch To Hai	Do Lafzon Ki Kahaani	Amaal Mallik
2016	Nindiya	Sarbjit	Shashi-Shivamm
2016	Bol Do Na Zara	Azhar	Amaal Mallik
2016	Tu Bhoola Jise	Airlift	Amaal Mallik
2015	Tujhe Apna Banane	Hate Story 3	Amaal Mallik
2015	– Main Hoon Hero Tera (Salman Khan Version – Main Hoon Hero Tera (Armaan Mallik Version) – Main Hoon Hero Tera (Sad Version)	Hero	Amaal Mallik
2014	Chaoro (Co-Produced with Aditya Dev)	Mary Kom	Shashi-Shivamm

=== Selected film scores ===
Year	Film/Series	Composer	Notes
2026	O'Romeo	Vishal Bhardwaj	Music Producer & Arranger
2022	Brahmāstra: Part One – Shiva	Pritam	Co-Composer
2021	Dial 100	Raju Singh	Music Producer & Arranger
2021	Saina	Amaal Mallik	– Music Producer & Arranger – Additional Music
2020	Four More Shots Please (season 2)	Mikey McCleary	– Music Producer & Arranger – Additional Composition
2020	Tanhaji	Sandeep Shirodkar	Additional Music Producer & Arranger
2019	Satellite Shankar	Sandeep Shirodkar	Additional Music Producer & Arranger
2019	Pal Pal Dil Ke Paas	Raju Singh	Additional Music Producer & Arranger
2019	Beecham House	Natalie Holt Craig Pruess	Indian recording sessions producer
2019	Student of the Year 2	Salim-Sulaiman	Additional Music Producer & Arranger
2019	Kesari	Raju Singh	Additional Music Producer & Arranger
2019	Bombairiya	Andrew T Mackay	Additional Music Producer & Arranger
2019	Jalebi	Raju Singh	Additional Music Producer & Arranger
2018	Raakshas	Andrew T Mackay	Additional Music Producer & Arranger
2018	Jai Simha	Chirantan Bhatt	Additional Music Producer & Arranger
2017	Brij Mohan Amar Rahe	Andrew T Mackay	Additional Music Producer & Arranger
2017	Dil Jo Na Keh Saka	Shail-Pritesh	Associate Music Producer & Arranger
2017	Toofan Singh	Raju Singh	Associate Music Producer & Arranger
2017	Jindua	Raju Singh	Associate Music Producer & Arranger
2017	Irada	Raju Singh	Associate Music Producer & Arranger
2017	Kaabil	Salim–Sulaiman	Additional Music Producer & Arranger
2016	Befikre	Mikey McCleary	Additional Music Producer & Arranger
2016	Ae Dil Hai Mushkil	Pritam	Additional Music Producer & Arranger
2016	Junooniyat	Raju Singh	Associate Music Producer & Arranger
2016	Do Lafzon Ki Kahani	Raju Singh	Additional Music Producer & Arranger
2016	Te3n	Clinton Cerejo	Additional Music Producer & Arranger
2016	Sarbjit	Shail – Pritesh	Associate Music Producer & Arranger
2016	Zorawar	Raju Singh	Associate Music Producer & Arranger
2015	Jai Gangaajal	Salim–Sulaiman	Additional Music Producer & Arranger
2015	Channo Kamli Yaar Di	Raju Singh	Associate Music Producer & Arranger
2015	Sanam Re	Raju Singh	Associate Music Producer & Arranger
2015	Shareek	Raju Singh	Additional Music Producer & Arranger

== Selective Non-film / Independent works ==
Year	Album/Single	Artist/Composer	Role/Notes
2024	Bandish Bandits Season 2 Song "Bebaqiyaan"	Meghdeep Bose (Music Composer) Nashra (Lyrics) Nikhita Gandhi (Singer) Yashaswini Dayama (Singer)	
2024	A Band Of Boys - Reignite: Gori Again; Nazron Se Dhokha; Sochna Kya?	Meghdeep Bose (Music Composer) Pinky Poonawala (Lyrics) A Band Of Boys (Singers)	
2024	Mere Hindostaan (Unplugged) Ft. Priyanshi Srivastava	Meghdeep Bose (Music) Manoj Yadav (Lyrics)	
2023	Kuhu Kuhu: Piya Tose; Aapki Nazaron	Khatija Rahman A R Rahman Firdaus Orchestra	Orchestral Adaptations as Music Arranger.
2023	Mere Hindostaan ft. Swaroop Khan	Meghdeep Bose (Music) Manoj Yadav (Lyrics)	
2023	A Heer	Meghdeep Bose (Music)	Featuring Rasika Sekar (Flute) Amritanshu Dutta (Indian Slide Guitar) Megha Rawoot (Sitar)
2023	Aa Vasant Rajni	Meghdeep Bose (Music) Mahadevi Varma (Lyrics)	
2023	SHAMBHO!	Meghdeep Bose (Music) Seema Nirankari (Lyrics)	
2023	Shantaram's Long Lonely Road (Bombay Dub Orchestra's Rework)	Gregory David Roberts Bombay Dub Orchestra Meghdeep Bose	– Indian Composition, – Hindi Lyrics & – Vocals.
2022	Is This That Feeling?	Shekhar Ravjiani	Music Producer & Arranger
2022	Main Tera – Zama – Maahiya	Azaan SamiMeghdeep Bose	
2022	Dooron Dooron	Paresh Pahuja Shiv Tandon Meghdeep Bose	
2022	"Rangrezwa" ft. Sonu Nigam	Meghdeep Bose (Music) Manoj Yadav (Lyrics)	
2021	"Tu Hi Hai" ft. Udit Narayan	Meghdeep Bose (Music) Sameer Rahat (Lyrics)	
2021	Boonda Baandi ft. Shekhar Ravjiani	Meghdeep Bose (Music) Manoj Yadav (Lyrics)	
2021	Garv Hai	Meghdeep Bose (Music) Parry G (Lyrics & Rap)	
2021	Tu	Azaan Sami Meghdeep Bose	
2021	DNA Mein Dance	Vishal–Shekhar	Music Producer & Arranger
2021	Main Tera	Azaan Sami Meghdeep Bose	
2020	"Maine Dekha Hai" ft. Pratibha Baghel	Meghdeep Bose (Music) Sameer Rahat (Lyrics)	
2020	Tanhaai	Sachet-Parampara feat. Tulsi Kumar	Music Producer & Arranger
2020	Sunrise in the West	Meghdeep Bose	Instrumental feat. various artists
2020	Kyun?	Aditya Narayan	Music Producer & Arranger
2020	Zara Thehro	Amaal Mallik Feat. Armaan Mallik	Music Producer & Arranger (Co-Produced: Abhijit Vaghani)
2020	Dooba	Aditya Narayan	Orchestral Arranger
2019	Miraya	AfterAcoustics	Music Producer, Arranger & Co-Writer
2019	Bairi	Farhad Bhiwandiwala & Sid Paul	Music Producer & Arranger
2019	Tera Sheher	Amaal Mallik	Music Producer & Arranger
2017	Tagore for Today – Jodi Tare feat. Anweshaa – Tomar Holo Shuru feat. Ash King	Rabindranath Tagore	Music Producer & Arranger

== Film and television works as composer ==
Year	Film/Series	(Notes)
2025	Black White & Gray - Love Kills	
2022	Chakki	(score)
2020	The Lonely Prince (Short)	(score)
2020	Welcome Home	(score)
2019	Truth or Tamanna?	(songs & scores)
2019	My name is Sheela	(score)
2019	Beecham House	(additional music – score)
2018	Duck Se Dude	(score)
2018	Enredados La Confusion	(score)
2017	Black Coffee	(score)
2017	Bose: Dead/Alive	(additional writing – score)

== Awards and nominations ==
Year	Award	Category	Song/Score	Film/Project	Result
2023	Clef Music Awards	Best Indian Classical Song	Aa Vasant Rajni	Single	Won
2023	Filmfare Awards	Best Background Score	Score	Bramhastra: Part One – Shiva	Nominated
2022	Indian Recording Arts Academy (IRAA) Awards	Best Music Producer (World/Fusion)	Boonda Baandi	Single	Nominated
2022	Indian Recording Arts Academy (IRAA) Awards	Best Music Producer (Spiritual/Devotional)	Tu Hi Hai	Single	Nominated
2021	Clef Music Awards	Best Music Producer – Public Choice	–	–	Won
2021	Clef Music Awards	Best Music Producer – Pop	Kyun ft. Aditya Narayan	Single	Won
2021	Clef Music Awards	Best Music Composer – OTT	Score	Welcome Home	Won
2021	Clef Music Awards	Best Artist – Ghazal	Maine Dekha Hai	Single	Won
2021	Clef Music Awards	Best Song – Ghazal	Maine Dekha Hai	Single	Won
2021	Clef Music Awards	Best Music Composer – Ghazal	Maine Dekha Hai	Single	Won
2020	Indian Recording Arts Academy (IRAA) Awards	Best Music Producer (Film Song)	Saugandh Mujhe	PM Narendra Modi	Nominated
2019	Indian Recording Arts Academy (IRAA) Awards	Best Music Producer (Web Series)	Teri Hai Panaah	Truth Or Tamanna	Won
2019	Indian Recording Arts Academy (IRAA) Awards	Best Music Producer (Regional Film)	Maya	Naa Peru Surya	Won
2018	Indian Recording Arts Academy (IRAA) Awards	Best Music Producer (Non Film)	Tomar Holo Shuru	Tagore for Today	Won
2018	Indian Recording Arts Academy (IRAA) Awards	Best Music Producer (Film Song)	Uff Ye Noor	Noor	Won
2018	Indian Wikimedia Awards	Best Composer	Score	Black Coffee	Nominated
2017	Indian Recording Arts Academy (IRAA) Awards	Best Music Producer (Film Song)	Bol Do Na Zara	Azhar	Won
