= Duaa (song) =

2012 Hindi song

Song by Arijit Singh, Nandini Srikar and Shekhar Ravjiani

from the album Shanghai (2012)
- Language: Hindi
- English title: "Prayer"
- Released: 2 May 2012 (full song); 23 May 2012 (music video)
- Genre: Filmi, Pop
- Length: 4:21
- Label: T-Series
- Composer: Vishal–Shekhar
- Lyricist: Kumaar

Music video
- "Duaa" on YouTube

"Duaa" (transl. Prayer) is a sad Hindi song from the 2012 Bollywood film, Shanghai. Composed by Vishal–Shekhar (Vishal Dadlani and Shekhar Ravjiani), the song is sung by Arijit Singh, Nandini Srikar and Shekhar Ravjiani, with lyrics penned by Kumaar. The music video of the track features actors Emraan Hashmi, Abhay Deol and Kalki Koechlin.

== Background ==
The song is composed by Vishal–Shekhar with lyrics written by Kumaar. The song is sung by Arijit Singh and Nandini Srikar with additional vocals by Shekhar Ravjiani. Srikar met Singh for the first time, during the recording of the song. It is a small song which consists of one mukhda and one antara. Towards the end of the song, Srikar performs a long alaap, which was kept as it is in the final version of the album as of the recording without any editing. Shekhar's voice is used in the song in an alaap in the interlude.

The track is a slow moving number which has a sad undertone to it and set in a semi-classical style. Vishal–Shekhar use a mix of Indian and Western sounds. The voice of a haunting cry is used, in the background of the song. The song dominates on vocals with minimum use of orchestra.

== Release and success ==
The song was released on music-streaming platforms, along with other track on 4 May 2012. The music video of the song was officially released through the YouTube channel of T-Series on 23 May 2012.

Arijit Singh won Upcoming Male Vocalist of The Year award at 2013 Mirchi Music Awards for the song.

== Critical reception ==
Reviewers from The Times of India stated that Nandini Srikar's strong voice modulations match well with Arijit Singh and Ravjiani's vocals. Bollywood Hungama's Joginder Tuteja commented that Kumaar does well as a lyricist in the song and "when one listens to the song, it teases listener to find out more about the film". Koimoi's Shivi felt that the 'inherent sadness' of the song was acutely conveyed by the singers and lyrics.

Reviewers from IBNLive praised the composition of the song and stated that the vocalists "together create the perfect track that makes you fall in love with the flow of emotions in it".

== Awards and nominations ==
Year	Award Ceremony	Category	Recipient	Result	Ref.
2012	Mirchi Music Awards	Upcoming Male Vocalist of The Year	Arijit Singh	Won	
