= Om Shanti Om (TV series) =

- Genre: Reality show
- Creative director: Pankaj Narayan
- Judges: Baba Ramdev; Sonakshi Sinha; Kanika Kapoor; Shekhar Ravjiani
- Theme music composer: Aditya Pushkarna
- Country of origin: India
- Original language: Hindi
- No. of seasons: 1
- No. of episodes: 27

Production
- Producers: Pankaj Narayan; Apoorva Bajaj
- Production locations: Mumbai, India
- Camera setup: Multi-camera
- Production companies: Colosceum Media, Ath Entertainment; Producerani Showrunner Creative Producer

Original release
- Network: Star Bharat
- Release: 28 August – 26 November 2017

Om Shanti Om is an Indian Hindi musical television series which broadcasts on Star Bharat. It is a reality show focusing on devotional music to contemporary music for which they are judged. Baba Ramdev is the overhead judge, main judges are Sonakshi Sinha, Kanika Kapoor and Shekhar Ravjiani, and hosted by Aparshakti Khurana. It was conceptualised by Pankaj Narayan and Apoorva Bajaj of Ath Entertainment along with Colosceum Media. The show launched on 28 August 2017 at the same time as the TV station STAR Bharat.

== Judges ==
- Baba Ramdev
- Sonakshi Sinha
- Shekhar Ravjiani
- Kanika Kapoor
- Aparshakti Khurana Host

== 2017 Contestants ==
- Rabjot Singh - 24 Years - Jammu
- Riya Bhattacharya - 21 Years - jhartkhand - 2nd Runner Up
- Bhanu Pandit - 23 Years - Rudki
- Arth kumar - 17 Years - Patna
- Anita Bhatt - 25 Years - Nainital
- Arfin Rana Mir - 24 Years - Kolkara WINNER
- Dipti Mishra - 24 Years - Lucknow
- Mukesh Pancholi - 35 Years - Madhya Pradesh
- Aditya Bansal - 15 Years - Manali
- Ananya chaudhary - 16 Years - Assam
- Balraj Shastri - 23 Years - Ahmedabad
- Zaid ali - 10 Years - Uttar Pradesh - 4th Runner Up
- Priya Malik - 17 Years - Patna 1st Runner-up
- Ritika Parmeshvar - 28 Years - Delhi
