= Shanghai (2012 film) =

2012 Indian film by Dibakar Banerjee

- Theatrical release poster
- Directed by: Dibakar Banerjee
- Screenplay by: Urmi Juvekar; Dibakar Banerjee
- Based on: Z by Vassilis Vassilikos
- Produced by: Ajay Bijli; Dibakar Banerjee; Sanjeev K Bijli; Priya Sreedharan
- Starring: Prosenjit Chatterjee; Emraan Hashmi; Abhay Deol; Farooq Shaikh, Kalki Koechlin; Pitobash Tripathy
- Cinematography: Nikos Andritsakis
- Edited by: Namrata Rao
- Music by: Songs: Vishal–Shekhar; Background Score: Mikey McCleary
- Production companies: Dibakar Banerjee Productions; NFDC; PVR Pictures
- Distributed by: PVR Pictures
- Release date: 8 June 2012
- Running time: 120 minutes
- Country: India
- Language: Hindi
- Box office: ₹349 million (US$3.6 million) million

Shanghai is a 2012 Indian Hindi-language political thriller film directed and co-written by Dibakar Banerjee. The film stars Prosenjit Chatterjee, Emraan Hashmi, Farooq Shaikh, Abhay Deol and Kalki Koechlin. It is a remake of 1969 French film Z which was based on the Greek novel Z by Vassilis Vassilikos. On 6 June 2012, the high court refused stay on the release of the film. It received critical acclaim upon its release but was considered a modest commercial success.

== Plot ==
The film is set in the fictional Indian city of Bharat Nagar which is considered an example of progress through infrastructure. The state government is planning to build an International Business Park (IBP), which is claimed to turn the city into 'Shanghai.'

The film starts with Bhagirath "Bhaggu" Dolas (Pitobash Tripathy) convincing his maternal uncle, Jagannath "Jaggu" Koli alias (Anant Jog) into performing an unknown task. Although unwilling, the latter takes it up fearing confiscation of his hypothecated vehicle due to possible issues in unpaid dues. Bhaggu then participates in the assault of a local bookstore owner who stocked copies of Dr. Ahmadi's (Prosenjit Chatterjee) latest book, which criticises Morcha, the local political party, for ignoring the plight of the poor in its quest for developing infrastructure. Ahmadi, a socialist academic, is scheduled to visit Bharat Nagar for a speech. Shalini (Kalki Koechlin), a former student of Ahmadi, is part of a small group that struggles to raise awareness against the much touted project, which could render many people homeless. Joginder Parmar alias Jogi (Emraan Hashmi) works in a photo and video studio of questionable repute with the owner, Vinod (Chandrahas Tiwari). T. A. Krishnan (Abhay Deol), an IAS officer, a favourite of the Chief Minister (Supriya Pathak), is assured by Principal Secretary Kaul (Farooq Shaikh) of a promotion and a trip to Stockholm.

Ahmadi arrives from New York City to find out that the required permissions for his speech have been revoked (due to Krishnan's influence) citing lower police protection. Before his arrival, Shalini gets a warning from Gauri, her maid, to stop him from coming to Bharat Nagar, but her words are not taken seriously by his associates. Jogi and Vinod are present at the Morcha party headquarters to shoot a promotional video on IBP featuring Janardhan Purshottamdas Sawant alias Deshnayak (Kiran Karmarkar), a local politician. On receiving a call, Deshnayak becomes flustered, and Damle, his aide, tells the duo to stop the shoot.

Meanwhile, Ahmadi finds a way to deliver a scathing speech against the establishment, which is received well. A mob later gathers and attacks his associates. On learning this, Ahmadi gets angry and starts shouting at the police officers managing the crowd. Unknown to the police, Jaggu's truck breaks in and runs over Ahmadi. One of Ahmadi's team members, Tiger, tries to intervene by jumping onto the truck and fighting Bhaggu, who was behind the truck. In the scuffle, Bhaggu is pushed off and manages to escape. Sometime later, Jaggu crashes his vehicle. This is noticed by a policeman nearby, and he is subsequently arrested. Jogi and Vinod were also present to cover Dr. Ahmadi's speech.

Ahmadi winds up comatose in a hospital. Shalini is confident that this was a planned attack. On seeing Jogi in the hospital, she asks him if they have any video footage of the crash, which could be used to find the perpetrators. Dr. Ahmadi's wife Aruna (Tillotama Shome) agrees to lead a media campaign demanding the truth, though she seems uninterested. Bhaggu meanwhile manages to free his uncle from prison.

Back in the studio, during a conversation with Jogi, Vinod claims to have incriminating evidence against Morcha and wishes to sell Shalini the tape. Meanwhile, Aruna's campaign forces the CM's office to set up an inquiry commission headed by Krishnan. Krishnan finds that the police are hiding evidence, so he summons SSP Chavan (Chinmay Mandlekar), who is also uncooperative. Shalini, who attends the commission snaps at Krishnan for allegedly taking it lightly, following which she is barred from attending any future hearings. Jogi, desperate to sell the tape futilely approaches Krishnan but is later approached by Shalini.

Shalini meets Vinod but leaves when Vinod says that he won't give the video for free. While she changes her mind later at night, she calls Jogi, who is shown to be in an ambulance with Vinod's wife, but in vain. Vinod is found dead in what looks like a road accident. At a later Morcha rally where Jogi is in the ambulance with Vinod's corpse, Damle approaches him and mentions the tape, subtly threatening him. Though initially reluctant, Jogi promises to help Shalini and Tiger in finding the evidence. He then attends a rally held by Deshnayak, on the occasion of his birthday. The three then rummage through the footage to find the conspirators, compile a CD and hand the evidence to Krishnan. In one of Deshnayak's rallies, Bhaggu and his uncle approach Damle over not releasing the truck involved in the accident, not paying Bhaggu's fees for his English classes, and not answering his calls. An irate Bhaggu threatens to spill the beans over Dr. Ahmadi's murder, following which Damle promises to sort everything out.

After viewing the evidence on the CD, Krishnan sends out a summons to Deshnayak, who rejects it in a public rally (where Bhaggu approaches Damle) sparking riots in the city. Shalini visits Jogi who is about to leave town. Meanwhile, Morcha thugs attack the studio while trying to search for Jogi. Jogi and Shalini manage to escape and hide on the roof until morning. In the chaos of the riots, Bhaggu, who is a part of the instigators is later found dead, ostensibly killed by Damle's men over the spat over releasing Jaggu's truck.

Shalini receives a panicked call from Gauri, who says that her family is in danger. Shalini and Jogi sneak over to Gauri's place, where it is revealed that Jaggu is Gauri's father. An angry Shalini starts beating Jaggu, who later opens up about the events of the crime. Jogi then remembers that Vinod had kept a backup of the incriminating tape, and sneaks back to the studio to get it. Krishnan meets with the Chief Minister about the inquiry. Jogi finds the CPU amid the studio's wreckage and has a narrow escape from the thugs chasing him. They all show Krishnan the video, which establishes that Deshnayak conspired to have Ahmadi killed and the Chief Minister was complicit in this plan.

The Chief Minister, buoyant because she has an opportunity to eventually become Prime Minister, presents Krishnan with the approval of his Stockholm trip, and a promotion. She also asks Krishnan to stop the probe and hand over all his findings to the CID of the State Police, which shall now investigate the case further. However, after seeing the evidence, Krishnan confronts Kaul with the truth, who then threatens to ruin Krishnan's career. Undeterred, Krishnan blackmails him, until Kaul finally leaves to talk to the Home Minister's secretary. In the hospital, Ahmadi's family decide to take him off life support.

An epilogue explains the fate of the major characters: Krishnan refused the chance to go to Stockholm to ensure that a national investigation is opened up as per his plan. Jogi escaped Bharat Nagar as a pornographer but is declared untraceable by the police. Shalini wrote a book about the conspiracy, which is banned in India. In the closing scene, a poster is shown carrying Aruna's picture with the slogan, "Chief Minister for all, IBP for all," implying that she is contesting for the CM's designation, and supports the IBP project. Jaggu is shown operating a bulldozer for demolishing old homes to make way for the business park. As Jaggu prepares to demolish the house, Dr. Ahmadi is shown turning toward him, which signifies Jaggu's trauma after the accident or the academic's futility in stopping the project.

== Cast ==
- Prosenjit Chatterjee as Dr. Ahmadi
- Emraan Hashmi as Joginder Parmar alias Jogi
- Abhay Deol as T. A. Krishnan
- Kalki Koechlin as Shalini Sahay
- Kiran Karmarkar as Janardhan Purshottamdas Sawant alias Deshnayak
- Supriya Pathak as Chief Minister
- Pitobash Tripathy as Bhagirath Dolas alias Bhaggu
- Farooq Shaikh as Kaul
- Tillotama Shome as Aruna Ahmedi
- Chinmay Mandlekar as SSP Chavan
- Anant Jog as Jagannath Koli alias Jaggu
- Naveen Kasturia as Dr. Ahmadi's team member
- Chandrahas Tiwari as Vinod
- Scarlett Mellish Wilson in the song "Imported Kamariya"

== Production ==
Filming started in May 2011 in Latur, Maharashtra. The first look was released on 5 April 2012. Shanghai premiered on 7 June 2012 at the IIFA awards in Singapore. The film was released in Bengali in a few locations.

== Reception ==
=== Critical reception ===
Madhureeta Mukherjee of ToI gave it 3.5 out 5 stars and said "Whether Shanghai is off-beat or mainstream is debatable, but if you thrive on rustic realistic cinema, however heavy-duty – this (Shanghai) is your pick". Suparna Sharma of The Asian Age rated the movie with 4.5 out of 5 stars: "Director Dibakar Banerjee loves this country dearly and Shanghai is his guttural, anguished wail. But being the super-smart, light-touch director that he is, he conducts the last rites of our beloved country to the loud, cheery strains of the song Bharat Mata ki, Bharat Mata ki... we are in mourning, but we are conducting Bharat Mata’s antim sanskar in a medieval fashion. We are dancing, screaming... And though the lyricist has added “jai bolo” at the end, that's not the sentiment of this song, or our mourning, or the film. The correct rendition of this song would end with the words “le lo”. Taran Adarsh of Bollywood Hungama rated the movie with 4 out of 5 stars: "On the whole, SHANGHAI is undeniably one of the most politically astute films ever made. It keeps you involved and concerned right from its inception to the harrowing culmination. This is not your usual Bollywood masala film, but a serious motion picture that has a voice, that makes you think, that makes a stunning impact. A must watch!". Mathures Paul of The Statesman gave three and a half out of five stars and wrote "Dibakar Banerjee succeeds in cranking up the tension effortlessly..." Rajeev Masand of CNN-IBN gave it 3.5 stars out of 5 saying "'Shanghai' is consistently watchable... It's a good film from one of Hindi cinema's most exciting filmmakers, just not great."

The song "Bharat Mata Ki Jai" (Victory for Mother India) was criticised by Congress party for its lyrics.

=== Special screening ===
After a gap of 2 years, this was the first Hindi, rather Indian film to be screened in Baghdad. It was critically acclaimed there, exceeding gross expectations.

==== Awards ====
- Filmfare Award for Best Costume Design (2013) – Manoshi Nath & Rushi Sharma
- IRDS Film Awards for Social concern, 2012: Best direction – Dibakar Banerjee
- Stardust Award for Best Supporting Actor (2013) – Prosenjit Chatterjee
- Mirchi Music Award for Upcoming Male Vocalist of The Year (2012) – Arijit Singh

== Box office ==
=== India ===
Shanghai had a poor first day as it collected around 9–10.5 million net on its first day. The film has just managed average collections at some high end multiplexes of metros during the first weekend, but the box office sales increased the subsequent week. Shanghai showed growth on Saturday of around 25%–30% as it collected in the 4–42.5 million nett region, but it needed much bigger growth as the starting level was so low. Shanghai collected around 72.5–75.0 million nett in two days which is not good. It fell flat on Sunday as collections could not grow as they did on Saturday; it grossed around 120 million nett over the weekend. The approximate breakdown on the weekend are 32.5 million nett on Friday, 42.5 million nett on Saturday and 45.0 million nett on Sunday. Shanghai had a low Monday as it collected around 17.5 million nett. The drop from Friday is less than 50% but collections are too low for a film released on nearly 1000 screens. Overall the movie was moderately successful.

=== Overseas ===
Shanghai was dull overseas grossing around $325,000. The film did not release in UK.

=== Satellite rights ===
The satellite rights of Shanghai have been sold for ₹8 crore and the music rights for Rs 2.75 crore. Also, 20% of theatrical rights have been sold for ₹40 million.

== Soundtrack ==
"Bharat Mata Ki Jai"
A 29-second sample of "Bharat Mata Ki Jai"

Shanghai

Soundtrack album by Vishal–Shekhar
- Released: 4 May 2012
- Genre: Feature film soundtrack
- Length: 29:50
- Label: T-Series
- Producer: Vishal–Shekhar

Vishal–Shekhar chronology
Kahaani (2012)	Shanghai (2012)	Student of the Year (2012)

The album was composed by Vishal–Shekhar. It received positive responses. Musicperk.com rated it 8/10 quoting "That makes a Hat-Trick for V-S. Must Buy." The review by Music Aloud said "After that brilliant start to 2012, Vishal Shekhar continue their good form, spinning off another winner" and rated it 8/10. Lyrics were penned by Dibakar Banerjee, Neelesh Misra, Kumaar, Vishal Dadlani and Anvita Dutt.

Track listing
No.	Title	Lyrics	Singer(s)	Length
1.	"Bharat Mata Ki Jai"	Dibakar Banerjee	Vishal Dadlani, Keerthi Sagathia, Mandar Apte, Chintamani Sohoni, R N Iyer, Bhupesh	4:06
2.	"Imported Kamariya"	Vishal Dadlani, Anvita Dutt	Richa Sharma, Vishal Dadlani, Shekhar Ravjiani	3:58
3.	"Duaa"	Kumaar	Arijit Singh, Nandini Srikar, Shekhar Ravjiani	4:20
4.	"Khudaaya"	Neelesh Misra	Shekhar Ravjiani, Raja Hasan	2:57
5.	"Morcha"	Kumaar	Raja Hasan	3:32
6.	"Bharat Mata Ki Jai" (Remix)		Vishal Dadlani, DJ Kiran, Keerti Sagathia	3:15
7.	"Khudaaya" (Remix)		Shekhar Ravjiani, DJ Kiran	3:26
8.	"Mantra: Vishnu Sahasranamam" (The Thousand Names of Lord Vishnu)		Srivatsa Krishna	4:55
Total length:				29:50
