= Besharam Rang =

2022 song by Vishal–Shekhar

- Official song cover

Single by Vishal–Shekhar, Shilpa Rao and Caralisa Monteiro

from the album Pathaan
- Language: Hindi-Urdu; Spanish
- Released: 11 December 2022
- Recorded: 2020–2022
- Studio: YRF Studios, Mumbai; YN Music Studio, Dubai; Czech TV Music Studio, Prague
- Genre: Dance; pop; Western classical
- Length: 4:18
- Label: YRF Music
- Composer: Vishal–Shekhar
- Lyricists: Kumaar (Hindi); Vishal Dadlani (Spanish)
- Producer: Yash Raj Films

Pathaan track listing
- 1. "Besharam Rang"; 2. "Jhoome Jo Pathaan"; 3. "Pathaan's Theme"; 4. "Jim's Theme"

Music video
- "Besharam Rang" on YouTube

"Besharam Rang" (transl. Shameless color) is an Indian Hindi-language song, composed by the duo of Vishal-Shekhar (Vishal Dadlani and Shekhar Ravjiani), with lyrics written by Kumaar and sung by Shilpa Rao, Caralisa Monteiro, with backing vocals by Vishal Dadlani and Shekhar Ravjiani for the soundtrack album of the 2023 Indian film Pathaan. It was released on 11 December 2022 as the first single from the album, through YRF Music. "Besharam Rang" was composed with an old-school approach in a modern musical arrangement. The track has Spanish verses written by Dadlani.

The song was also released in Tamil as "Azhaiyaa Mazhai" and in Telugu as "Naa Nijam Rangu". Upon release, the song received positive reviews by audience and critics. The hook step dance involving Deepika Padukone became popular. It has over 630+ million views on YouTube. "Besharam Rang" was the 2022's fastest 100 million views gainer on YouTube.

Shilpa Rao's vocal performance was acclaimed by critics and audiences and she won the Filmfare Award for Best Female Playback Singer and the Mirchi Music Award for Female Vocalist of the Year.

== Composition ==
"Besharam Rang" was first song composed by the duo Vishal-Shekhar for the Pathaan album. The song was conceptualized in the atrium of a building over coffees and casual chats, later being directly recorded in the studio. Recording took place during the first two phases of the COVID-19 lockdown in India. The song was attributed to the 'old school' way of compositions; it was initiated with dummy lyrics while Shilpa Rao recorded the patch. Kumaar worked on the lyrics, in receipt of her vocals. Dadlani called it an unusual way of working whereas Ravjiani clarified that the song had a different chorus and the hook line written was how the song shaped up. Original structure of composition was: full chorus – intro – cross line – hook line. There was a separate intro written which later landed into the lines "Humein To Loot Liya Milke..." On the music arrangement of "Besharam Rang", the duo mentioned that Warren Mendonsa recorded the guitar riffs in New Zealand; in the event of "Besharam Rang" drawing music comparisons with the song "Ghungroo", they clarified that Besharam Rang was a "sensual feminine track" and they did not work 'closed room' on the track. On coining the title "Besharam Rang", the duo gave credit to Kumaar who took the brief of the song and translated it. The brief of the lyrics was about 'a girl who by her sheer lack of innovation was incredibly attractive'. Kumaar did not write the track but instead let his ideas be written by Dadlani and Ravjiani.

== Music video ==
The music video features Deepika Padukone and Shah Rukh Khan. It was choreographed by Vaibhavi Merchant and shot in Spain.

== Critical reception ==
Bollywood Hungama praised the song and stated, "'Besharam Rang' is already a rage and comes into the film at an important juncture." Namrata Joshi of Cinema Express wrote "First impression: loved the smooth-as-silk voice of Shilpa Rao. Second: learnt some quick Spanish from the refrain—that translates as "today life is complete"—quite like how I picked up French from Nashe si chadh gayi in YRF's own Befikre. Third: in the process of hunting for the aforesaid miscreant saffron bikini and sarong (which features only between the last few seconds, 2.50 to 3.10 in the video) I got to see several other shades of swimwear on many sun-kissed, buff and largely foreign bodies and wondered if other colours are also feeling affronted for being called shameless. Fourth: the song grew on me enough to start playing on a loop and humming it even though I disliked the choreography by Vaibhavi Merchant." Times of India wrote "‘Besharam Rang’ is a peppy song and might be one of the best dancing tracks of the year." Niharika Sanjeeiv of NDTV wrote the song is "one of the best dancing tracks of the year."

== Impact ==
The song received positive reception from audiences, praising the music. The hook step, performed by Deepika Padukone, went viral on social media. As per Box Office India – Worldwide report of December 2022, within weeks of release, the song trended number one on YouTube. The song increased the expectations of the audience and controversies resulted increased number of reservations made in advance that Pathaan lodged.

"Besharam Rang" was the only Bollywood track of 2022 to gather fastest 100 million views on YouTube. Lyricist Manoj Muntashir, in an interview with Dainik Bhaskar, about Besharam Rang and the saffron color, said, "[...] the music team or Shah Rukh sir could have spotted the error, they would have certainly taken some action." Singer Sona Mohapatra expressed displeasure over the track calling it mediocre. Shilpa Rao, the singer of the track, stated that it was Padukone and Khan's 'chemistry' in the song and that makes it popular. She added that Padukone was 'celebrating herself' in the song – ‘the good, the bad and flawless’ which made her feel 'empowered to sing it'." Rao clarified that the track reached at a stage, where audience picked it up for popularity, followed by promotion, reach, and Instagram reels. She felt the meaning of the song was to 'express yourself without apologies' and to 'love yourself the way you are' and hence, the audience was expressing themselves and thus the popularity. Singer Baba Sehgal recorded a rap cover version of the song. Actress Nia Sharma released a cover video on the track.

== Credits and personnel ==
Credits adapted from YouTube.

- Vishal Dadlani – composer
- Shekhar Ravjiani – composer
- Kumaar – lyricist
- Shilpa Rao – vocal
- Caralisa Monteiro – vocal
- Vaibhavi Merchant – Choreographer
- Abhishek Khandelwal – mix
- Prathamesh Chande – editor
- Abhijit Nalani – programmer
- Warren Mendonsa – guitarist

== Charts ==
Chart performances for "Besharam Rang"
Chart (2023)	Peak position
India (Billboard) Besharam Rang	6

== Controversy ==
Right-wing Hindutva groups alleged that the song promotes obscenity and that it disrespects the saffron colour as Padukone features in a saffron bikini in the song. Madhya Pradesh home minister Narottam Mishra called the song objectionable and warned that his government may consider banning the film if costumes in the song are not corrected. TV actor Mukesh Khanna questioned the Censor Board for passing the song despite obscenity. The News Minute termed the entire controversy as "shameless misreading for jingoism" and stated that there were five different outfits worn by Padukone in the song and the boycotters are criticizing this particular scene which features merely for 20 seconds as it suits their agenda.

== See also ==
- Hindutva boycott of Bollywood films
