= Shekhar Ravjiani =

Indian singer

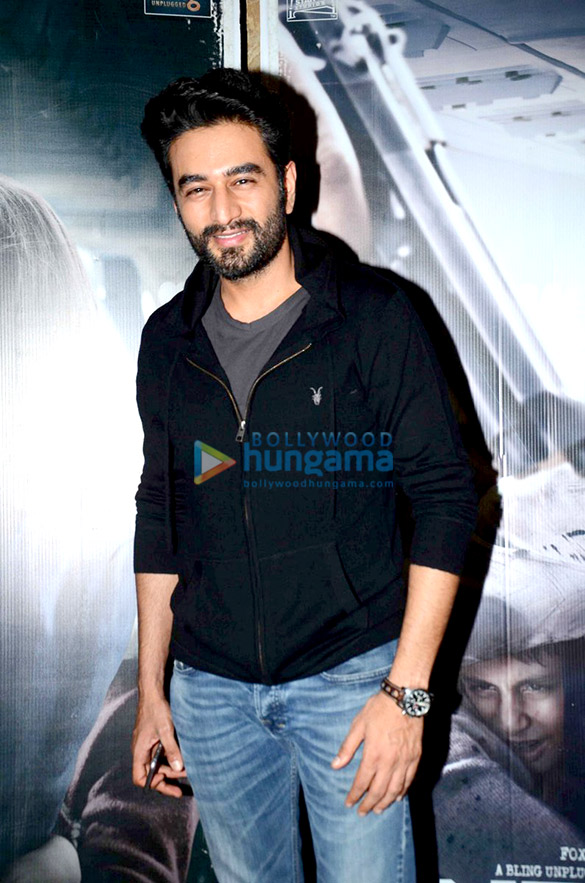
- Ravjiani at the special screening of Neerja in 2016

Background information
- Origin: Bhuj, Kutch district, Gujarat, India
- Genres: Filmi, Indian pop
- Occupation: Music director
- Years active: 1999–present
- Member of: Vishal–Shekhar

Shekhar Ravjiani is an Indian music director, who has been one half of the composing/producing duo Vishal–Shekhar, since 1999.

== Personal life ==
Ravjiani was born in a Kutchi family in Bhuj, Kutch district, Gujarat, India. He lives in South Mumbai with his wife Chhaya and daughter Bipasha.

== Career ==
He became a part of the duo Vishal–Shekhar. The duo produced many Bollywood songs, and they were judges at Sa Re Ga Ma Pa in 2007 and 2010. Ravjiani has sung the tracks "Tujhe Bhula Diya", "Bin Tere" and "Meherbaan".

== Discography ==
=== Music Director (Vishal and Shekhar) ===
- Pyaar Mein Kabhi Kabhi (1999)
- Kaante (2002)
- Supari (2003)
- Jhankaar Beats (2003)
- Waisa Bhi Hota Hai Part II (2003)
- Plan (2004)
- Shaadi Ka Laddoo (2004)
- Popcorn Khao! Mast Ho Jao (2004)
- Shukriya (2004)
- Musafir (2004)
- Shabd (2005)
- Home Delivery: Aapko... Ghar Tak (2005)
- Karam (2005)
- Dus (2005)
- Salaam Namaste (2005)
- Ek Ajnabee (2005)
- Bluffmaster (2005)
- Zinda (2006)
- Taxi Number 9211 (2006)
- Tathastu (2006)
- Golmaal (2006)
- I See You (2006)
- Honeymoon Travels Pvt. Ltd. (2007)
- Ta Ra Rum Pum (2007)
- Cash (2007)
- Om Shanti Om (2007)
- Bhoothnath (2008)
- De Taali (2008)
- Tashan (2008)
- Chintakayala Ravi (2008) (Telugu)
- Bachna Ae Haseeno (2008)
- Dostana (2008)
- Aladin (2009)
- I Hate Luv Storys (2010)
- Anjaana Anjaani (2010)
- Break Ke Baad (2010)
- Tees Maar Khan (2010)
- Bbuddah... Hoga Terra Baap (2011)
- Rascals (2011)
- Ra.One (2011)
- The Dirty Picture (2011)
- Arjun – The Warrior Prince (2012)
- Kahaani (2012)
- Shanghai (2012)
- Student of the Year (2012)
- Balak Palak(Marathi) (2013)
- Chennai Express (2013)
- Gori Tere Pyaar Mein (2013)
- Hasee Toh Phasee (2014)
- Bang Bang! (2014)
- Happy New Year (2014)
- Fan (2016)
- Sultan (2016)
- Akira (2016)
- Banjo (2016)
- Befikre (2016)
- Tiger Zinda Hai (2017)
- Naa Peru Surya (2018)
- Student of the Year 2 (2019)
- Bharat (2019)
- War (2019)
- Baaghi 3 (2020)
- Chehre (2021)
- Bob Biswas (2021)
- Jayeshbhai Jordaar (2022)
- Vikram Vedha (2022)
- Pathaan (2023)
- Dunki (2023) (solo composition); only one song
- Fighter (2024)
- Tu Meri Main Tera Main Tera Tu Meri (2025)

=== As a playback singer ===
| Year | Song | Film | Notes | Co Singers |
|---|---|---|---|---|
| 2025 | "Tu Meri Main Tera Main Tera Tu Meri – Title Track" | Tu Meri Main Tera Main Tera Tu Meri | | Vishal Dadlani |
| 2025 | "Hum Dono" | Tu Meri Main Tera Main Tera Tu Meri | | Shruti Pathak, Vishal Dadlani |
| 2025 | "Sobati" | Devmanus | Marathi film | Aarya Ambekar |
| 2023 | "Besharam Rang" | Pathaan | | Shilpa Rao, Caralisa Monteiro, Vishal Dadlani |
| 2023 | "Jhoome Jo Pathaan" | Pathaan | | Arijit Singh, Sukriti Kakar, Vishal Dadlani |
| 2022 | "Alcoholia" | Vikram Vedha | | Vishal Dadlani, Snigdhajit Bhowmik, Ananya Chakraborty |
| 2022 | "O Sahiba" | Vikram Vedha | | Vishal Dadlani |
| 2022 | "Firecracker" | Jayeshbhai Jordaar | | Vishal Dadlani |
| 2022 | "Firecracker (English)" | Jayeshbhai Jordaar | | Vishal Dadlani |
| 2022 | "Dheere Dheere Sheekh Jaunga" | Jayeshbhai Jordaar | | Priya Saraiya |
| 2022 | "Dil Ki Gali" | Jayeshbhai Jordaar | | Katyayni |
| 2021 | "Chehre - Title Track" (Reprise) | Chehre | | |
| 2020 | "Tehas Nehas" | Khaali Peeli | | Prakriti Kakar |
| 2019 | "The Hook Up Song" | Student of the Year 2 | Lyrics by Kumaar | Neha Kakkar |
| 2018 | "Lover Also Fighter Also" | Naa Peru Surya | Telugu film | |
| 2016 | "Kehkasha Tu Meri" | Akira | | |
| 2016 | "Rise of Sultan" | Sultan | | |
| 2016 | "Gehra Ishq" | Neerja | Composed by Vishal Khurana | Farhan Sabri, Shadaab Faridi |
| 2014 | "Sharabi" | Happy New Year | | Manj Musik, Nindy Kaur, Vishal Dadlani |
| 2014 | "Meherbaan", | Bang Bang! | | Ash King, Shilpa Rao |
| 2014 | "Meherbaan (Reprise) | Bang Bang! | | |
| 2014 | "Zehnaseeb" | Hasee Toh Phasee | | Chinmayi |
| 2013 | "Haravali Pakhare" | Balak-Palak | Marathi film | |
| 2012 | "Ishq Wala Love" | Student of the Year | | Salim Merchant, Neeti Mohan |
| 2012 | "Radha" | Student of the Year | | Shreya Ghoshal, Udit Narayan, Vishal Dadlani |
| 2012 | "Vele" | Student of the Year | | Vishal Dadlani |
| 2012 | "Imported Kamariya" | Shanghai | | Richa Sharma, Vishal Dadlani |
| 2012 | "Duaa" | Shanghai | | Nandini Srikar, Arijit Singh |
| 2012 | "Khudaaya" | Shanghai | | Raja Hasan |
| 2012 | "Aahatein (Remix)" | Ek Main Aur Ekk Tu | Composed by Amit Trivedi | |
| 2012 | "Samay" | Arjun: The Warrior Prince | | |
| 2011 | "Dildaara (Stand by Me)" | Ra.One | | Shafqat Amanat Ali, Clinton Cerejo, Vishal Dadlani |
| 2011 | "Bhare Naina" | Ra.One | | Nandini Srikar, Vishal Dadlani |
| 2011 | "Raftaarein" | Ra.One | | Vishal Dadlani, Jolly Mukherjee |
| 2010 | "Wallah Re Wallah" | Tees Maar Khan | | Shreya Ghoshal, Kamal Khan, Raja Hasan |
| 2010 | "Dhoop Ke Makaan" | Break Ke Baad | | Sunidhi Chauhan, Caralisa Monteiro |
| 2010 | "Dhoop Ke Makaan (Acoustic)" | Break Ke Baad | | Sunidhi Chauhan |
| 2010 | "Tumse Hi Tumse" | Anjaana Anjaani | | Caralisa Monteiro |
| 2010 | "Tujhe Bhula Diya" | Anjaana Anjaani | | Mohit Chauhan, Shruti Pathak |
| 2010 | "Bin Tere (Reprise)" | I Hate Luv Storys | | |
| 2009 | "Yeh Zindagi Bhi" | Luck by Chance | | |
| 2009 | "You May Be" | Aladin | | |
| 2008 | "Jogi Mahi" | Bachna Ae Haseeno | | Sukhwinder Singh, Himani Kapoor |
| 2008 | "Aaj Mein Boond Hoon" | De Taali | | |
| 2008 | "Hone Lagi" | De Taali | | |
| 2007 | "Cash (Theme Mix)" | Cash | | |
| 2007 | "Zara Bachke Jee" | Cash | | |
| 2007 | "Sajnaji" | Honeymoon Travels Pvt. Ltd. | | |
| 2006 | "Subah Subah" | I See You | | |
| 2006 | "Kehna Hai Jo" | I See You | | |
| 2006 | "Halo Halo" | I See You | | |
| 2006 | "Aage Peeche" | Golmaal: Fun Unlimited | | |
| 2006 | "Aazmale" | Taxi No. 9211 | | |
| 2005 | "Cucu – Mann Dole Tann Dole" | Home Delivery | | |
| 2003 | "Chaha Maine Chaha Bas Tujhi Ko Maine Chaha" | Supari | | |
| 2001 | "Churaya Churaya" | Rehnaa Hai Terre Dil Mein | | |
| 2001 | "Rehna Hai Tere Dil Mein" | Mujhe Kucch Kehna Hai | | |
| 1999 | "Dil Se Mere" | Pyaar Mein Kabhi Kabhi | | |

== Filmography ==
=== As a lyricist ===
- Anjaana Anjaani (2010) - "Aas Pas Khuda", "Aas Pas Khuda (Reprise)" (Along with Vishal Dadlani)
- Ra.One (2011) - "Chamak Chalo", "Chamak Chalo (International)" (Along with Vishal Dadlani, Niranjan Iyengar)

=== As an actor ===
| Year | Title | Role | Notes |
|---|---|---|---|
| 2016 | Neerja | Jaideep | Nominated – Stardust Awards for Superstar of Tomorrow |
| 2019 | Student of the Year 2 | Himself | cameo appearance; as a judge in the dance contest |
| 2021 | Love in the Times of Corona | Nirvik Singh | Voot Select anthology film; segment "Dinner in Lockdown" |

== Awards and nominations ==
Following is the list of awards and nominations received by Shekhar Ravjiani alone. List of awards and nominations received by Vishal–Shekhar can be seen here.

=== Mirchi Music Awards ===
| Year | Category | Recipient | Result | Ref. |
|---|---|---|---|---|
| 2013 | Song Recording/Sound Engineering of the Year | "Titli" (from Chennai Express) | Won | |

=== Filmfare Awards ===
| Year | Category | Recipient | Result | Ref. |
|---|---|---|---|---|
| 60th Filmfare Awards | Best Male Playback Singer | "Zehnaseeb " (from Hasee Toh Phasee) | Nominated | |

=== Stardust Awards ===
| Year | Category | Recipient | Result | Ref. |
|---|---|---|---|---|
| Stardust Awards | Superstar of Tomorrow | Neerja | Nominated | |

== Television ==
| Year | Title | Channel | Co-Judges |
|---|---|---|---|
| 2007 | Sa Re Ga Ma Pa Challenge 2007 | Zee TV | Himesh Reshammiya, Ismail Darbar, Bappi Lahiri, Vishal Dadlani |
| 2008 | Jo Jeeta Wohi Superstar | Star Plus | Vishal Dadlani, Farah Khan |
| 2010 | Sa Re Ga Ma Pa Singing Superstar | Zee TV | Vishal Dadlani, Sajid–Wajid, Daler Mehndi |
| 2013 | Indian Idol Junior | Sony TV | Vishal Dadlani, Shreya Ghoshal |
| 2016–17 | Dil Hai Hindustani | Star Plus | Karan Johar, Shalmali Kholgade, Badshah |
| 2016 | The Voice India Kids | &TV | Shaan, Neeti Mohan |
| 2017 | Om Shanti Om | Star Bharat | Kanika Kapoor, Sonakshi Sinha, Baba Ramdev |
| 2018 | Sa Re Ga Ma Pa Hindi 2018 | Zee TV | Wajid Khan, Sona Mohapatra / Richa Sharma |
