= Bombay Dub Orchestra =

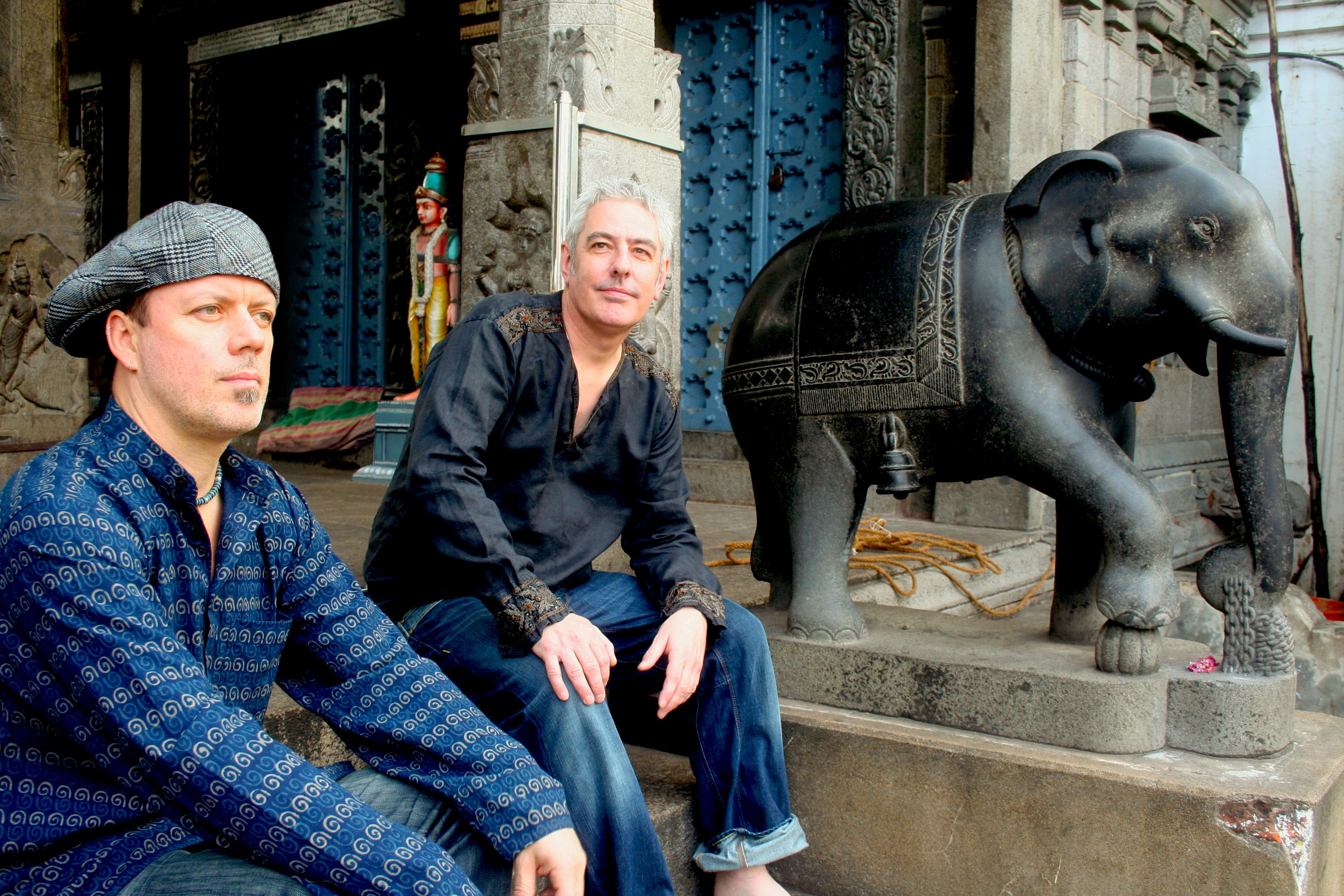
Bombay Dub Orchestra (Andrew T. Mackay & Garry Hughes) Chennai, India 2008

Bombay Dub Orchestra is the electronica/orchestral project of UK based composers Garry Hughes and Andrew T. Mackay. Their self-titled debut album was released in 2006.

They have performed at various film festivals around the world including Indian Film Festival of Los Angeles and Stuttgart's Bollywood and Beyond.

Their third album, Tales From The Grand Bazaar (2013), was recorded in Kingston, Jamaica with Sly & Robbie, Istanbul, Turkey; Bombay, India; London & Rockfield Studios, UK, Los Angeles, and New York.

== Discography ==
- Bombay Dub Orchestra, 2006
- Bombay Dub Orchestra Remixed Ep, 2006
- Monsoon Malabar EP, 2008
- 3 Cities, 2008
- 3 Cities in Dub, 2009
- The New York Remixes, 2012
- Tales From the Grand Bazaar, 2013
- Bohemia Junction Remixes, 2014
