= MW (Indian magazine) =

Indian men's luxury lifestyle magazine

MW India
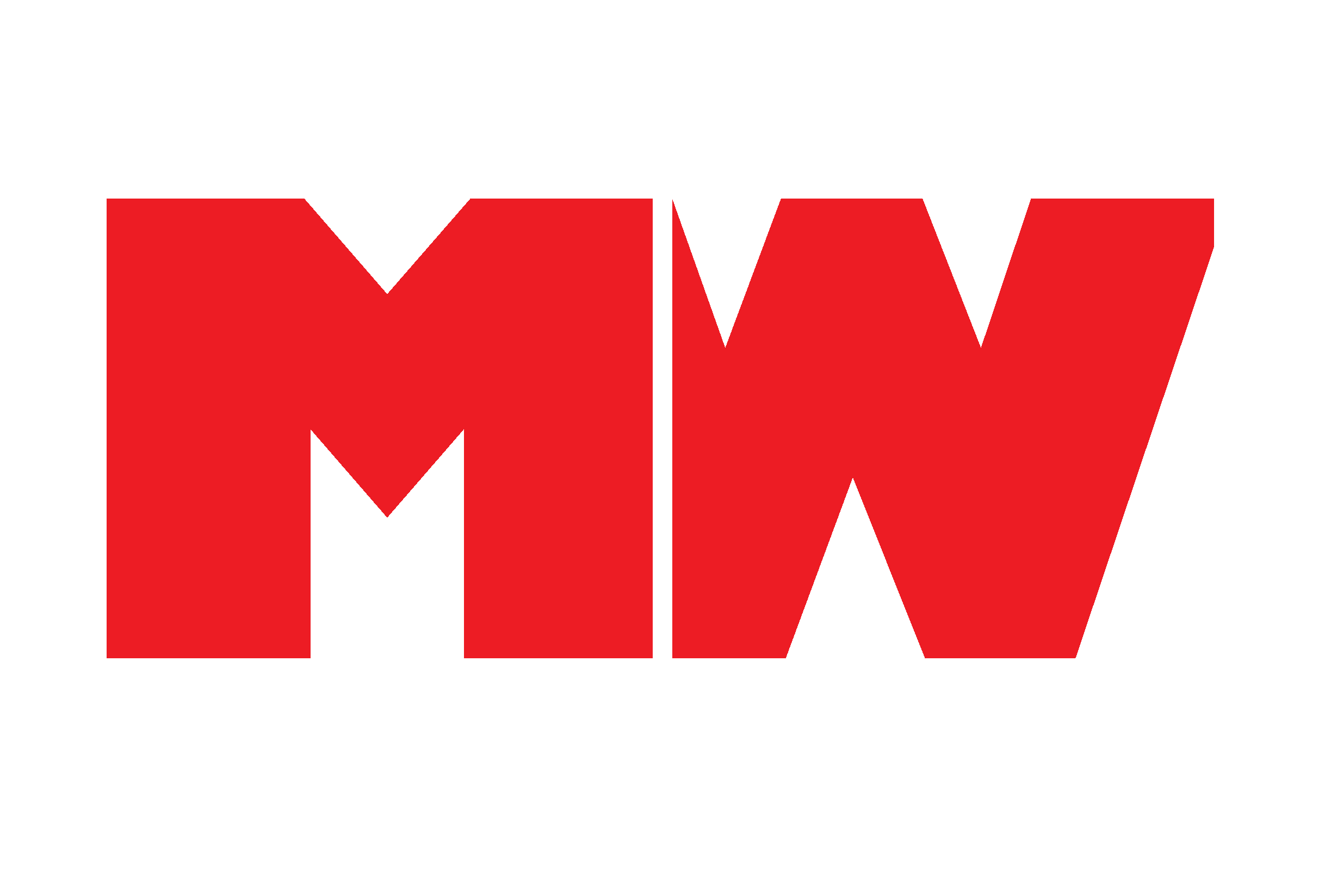

- Man's World (MW) cover for January 2017 with Hrithik Roshan
- Editor: Radhakrishnan Nair
- Categories: Men's luxury lifestyle
- Frequency: Monthly
- Circulation: 60,000
- Founded: 2000
- First issue: February 2000
- Country: India
- Based in: Mumbai
- Language: English
- Website: mansworldindia.com

MW magazine, which was earlier known as Man's World, is one of India's leading men's luxury lifestyle magazines. Founded in 2000, MW's mission is to equip Indian men with information and advice to help them lead life to the fullest.

== History ==
Man's World was founded by Anuradha Mahindra and two leading Mumbai-based journalists, Radhakrishnan Nair, then the Executive Editor of Business India and Harsh Man Rai, the Creative Director. It was targeted at a generation of young men who were coming of age in the first decade of the economic boom unleashed by the economic liberalisation in India in early 1990s.

The magazine's first issue featured Shah Rukh Khan, followed by the likes of Sachin Tendulkar, Amitabh Bachchan, and a string of achievers from the world of films, sports, and business. The magazine's name was shortened to MW in 2008.

== Publisher ==
MW's parent company, MW.Com India Pvt Ltd, changed hands in September 2021 when the controlling interest was bought over from Spenta Multimedia Pvt Ltd by Ventureland Asia Advisory Services, the venture capital arm of Creativeland Asia group owned by advertising veteran Sajan Raj Kurup. The name of the company was subsequently changed to Creativeland Publishing Pvt Ltd.

Creativeland Publishing Pvt Ltd also publishes Rolling Stone India, the local Indian edition of the world's leading music and culture magazine. Radhakrishnan Nair is the publisher and Editor-in-chief of MW and Rolling Stone India edition. The company's contract publishing division publishes OnStage, the culture magazine owned by the National Centre for the Performing Arts (NCPA), Mumbai.

== See also ==
- List of men's magazines
