= Nandini Srikar =

Indian singer and performer (born 1969)

- Born: 10 August 1969 (age 56); Hyderabad, Andhra Pradesh (present-day Telangana), India
- Years active: 1997 – present

Nandini Srikar (born 10 August 1969) is an Indian singer and performer. Her popular songs include Jo Bheji thi Duaa from the Bollywood movie, Shanghai, "Bhare Naina" from Ra.One and "Kannamma" from Rekka.

== Early life ==
She was born in Hyderabad, India. She went to school and university there. Her mother, Shakunthala Chellappa, was a Carnatic vocalist and Hindustani Sitar player. As a child, she studied classical music, learning how to play veena at age three. She later learned sitar and guitar and Bharatanatyam. She earned a master's degree in pure Mathematics from Osmania University and a degree in information systems management.

== Career ==
Srikar after graduation, worked in software in Pune. She originally had no intention of becoming a professional musician and pursued music only as a hobby.

In 1997, playback singer Hariharan heard her song and suggested to Vidyasagar that he hire her to sing for his upcoming film Uyirodu Uyiraga. In the film, she performed a duet with KK called "I Love You" and the song became a hit. She quit her job and focused on music, collaborating with Ranjit Barot, Trilok Gurtu and Wally Badarou. She also began to write advertising jingles. In 2001, she appeared on Mahmood Khan's album Panah.

In 2008, she worked with music director Dhruv Ghanekar with the vocal arrangements and harmonies for the songs in Drona. Her debut solo album Beete Pal was released in 2011 in which she has composed, programmed, produced and performed all the songs. The album features Kai Eckhardt (Bass), Prasanna (Guitar), Michael Pope (Bass), Steve Zerlin (Bass), Atma Anur (Drums), Ed DeGenaro (Guitar) and other musicians. Her next venture is a collaboration with Shri and DJ Badmarsh.

In year 2016, she also worked for a Pakistani movie Hijrat (film) (directed by Farouq Mengal and produced by FM Productions). She sang an item song "Chali Re Chali" and Sana Nawaz (a popular Pakistani actress) appeared in the song.

In 2021, she collaborated with duo gardenstate in their song, “Aurora”.

She is married and speaks Tamil, English, Hindi and Telugu.

== Discography ==
- 2001 Panah
- 2011 Beete Pal

== Filmography as playback singer ==
=== Marathi songs ===
Year	Album	Song	Composer(s)	Writer(s)	Co-singer(s)
2015	Runh	Samjena	Sangeet Siddharth	Guru Thakur	Arrangers & Programmers: Sangeet Siddharth & Shon Pinto

=== Hindi songs ===
Year	Album	Song	Composer(s)	Writer(s)	Co-singer(s)
2001	Abhay	Zingoria	Shankar Ehsaan Loy	Javed Akhtar	Universal Music India Pvt Ltd.
2004	Morning Raga				
2005	Brides Wanted				
2005	Hanuman	Hanuman			
2006	Humko Deewana Kar Gaye				
2008	Drona	Nanhe Nanhe	Dhruv Ghanekar	Vaibhav Modi	
2008	Drona	Oop Cha	Dhruv Ghanekar	Vaibhav Modi	
2009	Three – Love, Lies and Betrayal	Hamein Pyaar Karo		Sagar	
2011	Ra.One	Bhare Naina	Vishal And Shekhar		
2012	Agent Vinod	Dil Mera Muft ka	Vishal And Shekhar		
2012	Shanghai (2012 film)	Duaa	Vishal And Shekhar	Kumaar	Arijit Singh, Shekhar Ravjiani
2013	Club 60	Mera Saaya	Vishal And Shekhar		
2014	Queen	Harjaiyaan	Amit Trivedi		
2016	Fitoor	Hone Do Batiyaan	Amit Trivedi, Swanand Kirkire		
2016	Nil Battey Sannata	Maula			

- 2006 Humko Deewana Kar Gaye
- 2007 Johnny Gaddaar (Tamil)
- 2009 Barah Aana
- 2016 Hijrat (film) (Chali Re Chali) (Urdu)
- 2017 Vimaanam (Anthimaanam Mele) (Malayalam)

=== Tamil songs ===
- 1998 Uyirodu Uyiraga - I Love You
- 2001 Aalavandhan - Africa kaattupuli
- 2003 Joot - Kattabomma
- 2007 Urchagam - Narampookkal
- 2013 Moondru Per Moondru Kaadhal - Aaha Kaadhal
- 2014 Nerungi vaa muthamidadhe - Yaar
- 2016 Rekka - Kannamma Kannamma
- 2022 Valimai - Enna Kuraiyo

== Television ==
- Taare Ankboot (2013)
- Ishq Main Aisa Haal Bhi Hona Hai (2014)
- Kambakht Tanno (2016)
- Shehrnaz (2017)
- Ahsas (2017)
- Haara Dil (2018)
- Sodai (2018)

== Awards ==
- Zee Chitra Gaurav Puraskar for Best Playback Singer – Female for song Kshan Kalache from film Unaad
- (GiMA 2012)- Nandini Srikar won the best playback singer female for her song Bhare Naina in Ra.One.
- Mirchi Music Awards South 2014 - Nandini Srikar won the best female singer of the year award for her song "Aaha Kaadhal" from Moondru Per Moondru Kaadhal.
- Southern India Cinematographers' Association - SICA Award 2015 - Nandini Srikar won the best female singer of the year award for her song "Harjaiyaan" from the film Queen.
- She also won Norway Tamil awards - Best Playback singer for Kannamma for Movie Rekka
