= Pathaan (film) =

2023 Indian film by Siddharth Anand

- Theatrical release poster
- Directed by: Siddharth Anand
- Screenplay by: Shridhar Raghavan
- Dialogues by: Abbas Tyrewala
- Story by: Siddharth Anand
- Produced by: Aditya Chopra
- Starring: Shah Rukh Khan; Deepika Padukone; John Abraham; Dimple Kapadia; Ashutosh Rana
- Cinematography: Satchith Paulose
- Edited by: Aarif Sheikh
- Music by: Songs: Vishal–Shekhar; Score: Sanchit Balhara and Ankit Balhara
- Production company: Yash Raj Films
- Distributed by: Yash Raj Films
- Release date: 25 January 2023
- Running time: 146 minutes (Note: The theatrical runtime of the film was 146 minutes. However, on Amazon Prime Video, it was released with an extension of +2 minutes (148 minutes).)
- Country: India
- Language: Hindi
- Budget: ₹250 crore
- Box office: est. ₹1,050.30 crore

Pathaan (pronounced [pəʈʰaːn]) is a 2023 Indian Hindi-language action thriller film directed by Siddharth Anand and produced by Aditya Chopra under Yash Raj Films. The film stars Shah Rukh Khan in the titular role, alongside Deepika Padukone, John Abraham, Dimple Kapadia, and Ashutosh Rana with Salman Khan appears in a cameo appearance. It is the fourth installment in the YRF Spy Universe, the first installment in the universe to establish crossovers between characters from other universe films and set after the events of Ek Tha Tiger (2012), Tiger Zinda Hai (2017) and War (2019). The film follows an exiled RAW agent who works with an ISI agent to take down a former RAW agent turned rogue, who plans to attack India with a deadly lab-generated virus.

Principal photography commenced in November 2020 in Mumbai. The film was shot in various locations in India, Afghanistan, Spain, UAE, Turkey, Russia, Italy, and France. The film's soundtrack was composed by Vishal–Shekhar, while Sanchit Balhara and Ankit Balhara composed the background score. The film was made on an estimated production budget of ₹250 crore (equivalent to ₹273 crore or US$29 million in 2026).

It was theatrically released in India on 25 January 2023, coinciding with the Republic Day weekend. The film received positive reviews from critics and was a box office success. It grossed 1,050.50 cr worldwide, becoming the tenth highest-grossing Indian film of all time. At the 69th Filmfare Awards, the film received 16 nominations, including Best Film, Best Director and Best Actress (Padukone), and won Best Female Playback Singer (Shilpa Rao for the song "Besharam Rang"). A sequel is in production with the script finalised.

== Plot ==
In 2019, the Indian Government revokes Article 370 of the Indian Constitution, which grants special status to Jammu and Kashmir. The decision prompts cancer-ridden Pakistani Army officer General Qadir to seek revenge against India by signing a contract with a private terrorist organisation, Outfit X.

2022: Pathaan, a RAW agent, captures arms dealer Raafe in Africa. Back in India, RAW officer Nandini Grewal recounts Pathaan's past to a junior colleague after the agency discovers something it has been searching for.

2020: Following his recovery from a mission in Myanmar, Pathaan and Nandini establish the Joint Operations and Covert Research (J.O.C.R.) unit to recruit former agents and soldiers forced into retirement who wish to continue serving their country. Meanwhile, Outfit X plans to attack the President's convoy, but midway through the counteroperation, Pathaan realizes that scientists Dr. Sahani and Dr. Farooqui, who were part of the convoy, are the actual targets of the attack instead of the President.

Jim, the leader of Outfit X, attacks the scientists' convoy. Pathaan attempts to stop him and manages to rescue Dr. Farooqui, but Jim escapes with Dr. Sahani. During a debriefing, agency chief Colonel Sunil Luthra reveals that Jim was a former agent and Kabir's former partner, who was presumed dead and posthumously awarded the Vir Puraskar after the agency could not find his body when Somalian terrorists killed his pregnant wife and unborn child in front of his eyes following the terrorists' failure due to a rescue operation Jim was part of.

Investigating the codeword "Raktbeej", Pathaan discovers that the people killed in Dubai were former agents and that their money was transferred from the account of Rubina "Rubai" Mohsin, a Pakistani doctor in Spain. He travels there but is captured by Jim's men, who are former members of various national intelligence agencies. Pathaan also learns that Rubai is an ex-ISI agent and that Raafe works for Jim. When Jim leaves his hideout, Rubai attacks his men and escapes with Pathaan. After a nightmare about her childhood, in which her father, a doctor, was tortured to death, Rubai reveals that Raktbeej is in Moscow. They travel there to retrieve it before Jim can. However, just as their mission is about to succeed, Rubai betrays Pathaan, and Russian police arrest him. Jim has manipulated Rubai into helping Pathaan steal Raktbeej for him. After Nandini disavows him, Pathaan is transported to prison by train but is rescued by Tiger.

2022: Pathaan reunites with Nandini and reveals that Jim is purchasing two Saber missiles. Nandini provides Rubai's location in Paris, where Pathaan confronts her. She explains that Raktbeej is the codename for a mutated smallpox virus, which Jim forced the captive Dr. Sahani to develop. Pathaan and Rubai travel to Jim's laboratory in Siberia, where they recover one orb containing the virus, but Jim escapes with the other. Luthra and Nandini arrive to take the recovered orb to India so that scientists can develop a vaccine.

At the Indian Institute of Contagious Diseases, Dr. Farooqui opens the orb in Nandini's presence but apparently finds nothing. Jim then reveals that the virus has already spread throughout the facility, which is subsequently destroyed in a controlled explosion. He demands that India evacuate its soldiers from Kashmir within 24 hours. Pathaan discovers that a missile is located in Afghanistan. After rescuing Rubai, they lure Jim's associates into a trap and attack his base. Rubai kills Qadir after he activates the missile and then deactivates it herself. However, they discover that Raktbeej is not aboard the missile but has instead been placed on a passenger aircraft approaching Delhi.

Rubai alerts Pathaan, who realises that Jim possesses the detonator. Luthra contacts air traffic control to prevent the aircraft from landing in Delhi. After a prolonged mid-air pursuit, Pathaan and Jim crash into a cabin and engage in a brutal fight. Pathaan seizes the detonator, deactivates Raktbeej and kills Jim.

Following the mission, Pathaan is reinstated and appointed head of J.O.C.R. Luthra gives him a file containing the names of former agents and soldiers who wish to serve again, tasking him with mentoring and training them. Nandini is posthumously awarded the Vir Puraskar for her bravery.

In a mid-credits scene, Pathaan and Tiger reflect on retirement and consider whether younger agents could replace them. They ultimately decide to continue fighting the threats themselves.

== Cast ==
- Shah Rukh Khan as Pathaan
- Deepika Padukone as Dr. Rubina "Rubai" Mohsin, an ISI agent
  - Grace Girdhar as young Rubina
- John Abraham as Jim, leader of "Outfit X" and a former RAW Agent
- Dimple Kapadia as Dr. Nandini Grewal, head of the Joint Operations and Covert Research (JOCR)
- Ashutosh Rana as Colonel Sunil Luthra
- Ekta Kaul as Shweta Bajaj, hacker and member of JOCR
- Shaji Choudhary as Raza, member of JOCR
- Diganta Hazarika as Joseph Mathews, sniper and member of JOCR
- Viraf Patel as Rishi Arya, intelligence analyst and member of JOCR
- Aakash Bhatija as Amol, member of JOCR
- Rajat Kaul as Raafe, Jim's henchman and a former GID agent
- Manish Wadhwa as General Qadir
- Prakash Belawadi as Dr. Sahani
- Prem Jhangiani as Dr. Farooqui
- Rumi Khan as Jim's henchman
- Mansi Taxak as Jim's wife
- Ashutosh Singh as Rubai's father
- Amanpreet Hundal as Rubai's mother
- Keith Sequeira as Captain Mehra
- Rakesh Khatri as ATC Supervisor
- Mustafa Aksari as Fayyed, an African arms dealer
- Jeffrey Adams Goldberg as Anton
- Rachel Ann Mullins as Alice
- Nikhat Khan as Sabba, Pathaan's foster mother
- Salman Khan as Avinash Singh Rathore (cameo appearance)

== Production ==
=== Development ===
Yash Raj Films, Shah Rukh Khan, Deepika Padukone, and John Abraham officially announced Pathaan on 2 March 2022 on their social media accounts, revealing the release date with a first look teaser. It was previously teased by other cast and crew members, including Salman Khan and singer-songwriter Vishal Dadlani, on various occasions before. Dadlani announced the film on Twitter, stating, "No number from the past matters, no number in the future is too big. The whole world is waiting for Shah Rukh, more importantly, we're all working on a kickass film with great songs." This film is YRF's first Dolby Cinema project.

=== Casting ===
Shanoo Sharma was the casting director. Khan was cast in the film in September 2020. Padukone joined production that November, while Abraham rounded out the main cast in June 2021, joining filming in Mumbai. Dimple Kapadia was cast in December 2020. Salman Khan was confirmed to make a cameo appearance in November 2020, reprising his role as Avinash Singh Rathore from the Tiger franchise.

=== Filming ===
Principal photography of the film began on 17 November 2020 in Mumbai. In January 2021, filming moved to Dubai. Some of the major action sequences including a long chase sequence were shot in the same schedule. On 12 April 2021, the crew took a two-day break. However, following the reports of some crew members of the film tested positive for COVID-19 and subsequent lockdown in Maharashtra, further schedules of the film were postponed. The filming resumed on 25 June at Yash Raj Studios in Mumbai. Later in July, another schedule of the film began. Padukone began filming in this schedule. A song was scheduled to be shot from 7 October in Mallorca and Cádiz, but the schedule was postponed.

In February 2022, production moved to Spain to shoot action sequences including Khan, Padukone, and Abraham. Filming then took place in Mallorca and Cádiz. The Spain schedule was completed in March 2022, with the Mumbai schedule completed in Yash Raj Studios as the film wrapped. In October 2022, reshoots and additional scenes were completed. The film was shot in multiple locations across India, Afghanistan, Spain, United Arab Emirates, Turkey, Russia, Italy and France. It was the first Indian film to be shot in Siberia's Lake Baikal.

== Music ==
The soundtrack album for Pathaan featured four tracks: two songs, "Besharam Rang" and "Jhoome Jo Pathaan", composed by Vishal–Shekhar and written by Kumaar and two instrumental themes from the original score written and composed by Sanchit and Ankit Balhara: "Jim's Theme" and "Pathaan's Theme". Apart from its original version, the soundtrack album was released in Tamil and Telugu.

== Controversy ==
Various groups criticised the song "Besharam Rang", for allegedly promoting obscenity and disrespecting the saffron color, since Padukone featured in a saffron bikini in the song. Madhya Pradesh then home minister Narottam Mishra called the song objectionable and warned that his government might consider banning the film if the highlighted issues were not addressed and corrected. Khan's effigies and posters were burnt in various cities of Madhya Pradesh as a symbol of protest against the film. TV actor Mukesh Khanna questioned the Censor Board for passing the song despite obscenity. A Muslim organization, All India Muslim Tewhar Committee, also objected to the film's name and demanded a ban on the movie, as it allegedly insulted sentiments of the Pathaan clan.

On 29 December 2022, the Central Board of Film Certification (CBFC) asked the filmmakers to make some changes in the film, including in its songs citing culture and faith. The film went through some minor changes though the saffron dress scene in the song "Besharam Rang" was retained. The movie was later granted a U/A certificate by the CBFC.

On 4 January 2023, members of Bajrang Dal tore down the posters of the film at a multiplex in Ahmedabad. They also warned against releasing the movie in theaters. Gujarat Multiplex Association wrote a letter to Chief Minister Bhupendra Patel and Home Minister Harsh Sanghavi on these threats received from various groups to which Sanghavi assured protection to multiplexes on the release of the film and instructed police chiefs of cities and districts to provide protection to the theaters.

On 17 January 2023, during the BJP national executive meeting in New Delhi, Prime Minister Narendra Modi told his party workers and leaders to refrain from making unnecessary remarks on films. Assam's chief minister, Himanta Biswa Sarma, assured Khan that his government would maintain the law and order during his movie's screening in the state.

== Marketing and release ==
The release date of Pathaan was revealed on 2 March 2022 through an announcement teaser. A first look motion poster of Khan was revealed on 25 June 2022. The teaser of the film was released on 2 November 2022, coinciding with Shah Rukh Khan's 57th birthday. The official trailer was released on 10 January 2023. The film's trailer was also showcased on Burj Khalifa on 14 January 2023. Against norm, pre-release publicity was limited with no media interactions or public events.

=== Theatrical ===
It was theatrically released, in standard, IMAX and 4DX versions, in India on 25 January 2023, coinciding with Indian Republic Day weekend along with dubbed versions in Tamil and Telugu. It was the first Indian film to release in the novel ICE theater format. The film was released across 8000 screens worldwide, which included 5,500 screens across India and 2,500 screens across overseas markets.

The film was theatrically released in Bangladesh on 12 May 2023 and thus became the first Hindi film to be released in the country. The film was released in Russia on 13 July 2023. The film was also released in Japan on 1 September 2023.

=== Home media ===
The digital streaming rights of the movie were sold to Amazon Prime Video for ₹100 crore (US$11 million). On the platform, the film's extended version was premiered on 22 March 2023 in Hindi, Tamil and Telugu.

== Reception ==
=== Box office ===
It broke several box-office opening records for a Hindi film. Globally, it became the first Hindi film to gross ₹100 crore (equivalent to ₹109 crore or US$12 million in 2026) on its first day. It earned ₹106 crore (equivalent to ₹116 crore or US$12 million in 2026) worldwide on its opening day, with ₹70 crore (US$7.5 million) from India and ₹36.69 crore (US$3.9 million) from overseas. It also became the highest opener in the domestic Hindi market, collecting ₹55 crore (US$5.9 million) net in Hindi, breaking the previous record of KGF Chapter 2 and collected ₹57 crore (US$6.1 million) in terms of all-India net collection across all languages, which is also the highest for a Hindi film. Worldwide, the film crossed the ₹200 crore (US$21 million) mark, in the first two days, the ₹300 crore (US$32 million) mark in the first three days, and the ₹400 crore (US$43 million) mark in its first four days, becoming the fastest Hindi film to do all. In India too, it became the fastest Hindi film to collect ₹200 crore (US$21 million) and ₹300 crore (US$32 million), which it did within four and seven days, respectively. It broke these records previously held by the Hindi dubbed version of the Kannada film KGF: Chapter 2 (2022). By the second weekend, it became the first original Hindi film to net over ₹400 crore (US$43 million) domestically, overtaking Dangal (2016).

Territory	Gross
United States	$11,438,864
Canada	$6,053,482
Rest	$290,000
America Total	$17,782,346
Australia	A$ 4,720,711 – $3,322,400
Malaysia	RM 3,832,338 – $897,400
Singapore	SG$ 1,050,000 – $796,400
New Zealand	NZ$ 1,373,806 – $882,000
Nepal	रु 132,800,810.40 – $1,025,000
Indonesia	$240,000
Thailand	$90,000
Sri Lanka	$180,000
Hong Kong	$90,000
Bangladesh	$275,000
Japan	$300,000
Rest Asia	$175,000
Asia-Pacific Total	$8,273,000
United Arab Emirates	$8,192,000
Saudi Arabia	$2,165,000
Africa + Rest Middle East	$4,500,000
Middle East + Africa Total	$14,857,000
United Kingdom–Ireland	£4,380,848 – $5,374,500
Germany	€889,469 – $964,000
Spain	€73,200 – $79,400
Netherlands	€616,337 – $668,000
Portugal	$29,260
Russia	$54,802
Italy	$60,400
Austria	$100,000
Belgium	$180,000
France	€268,000 – $290,000
Finland	$58,900
Norway	kr 1,250,000 – $117,800
Rest Europe	$560,000
Europe Total	$8,537,000
Worldwide Total	$49,450,000

Outside India, movie's opening-weekend overseas gross totalled US$25.5 million in its five-day extended weekend. IMAX grosses accounted for US$2.5 million, the highest for an Indian film at that time. In North America and Canada, it earned US$6.88 million in its opening weekend from 695 theatres, finishing third, for a total of US$9.48 million; a record for a Hindi film. In the United Kingdom and Ireland box office, it recorded the highest single-day gross for an Indian film with £319,348. Over the weekend, it earned £1.4 million, finishing second after Avatar: The Way of Water, for a total of £2 million. It set further Hindi-film opening weekend records in UAE, Malaysia, Singapore, and Saudi Arabia, and Indian-film opening weekend records in Australia, New Zealand, and Germany. With a US$582,000 gross in Germany, it became the highest-grossing Hindi film in the market in its opening weekend itself. Box Office India reported that by grossing around US$31 million in its first eight days, it became the highest-grossing Hindi film in overseas, excluding China (where it did not release).

By the second weekend, it emerged as the highest-grossing Hindi film in the US, earning over $13.4 million, overtaking Dangal, and in the UK, it became the first Indian film to earn over £3 million, grossing $4.15 million. It also became the highest-grossing Indian film in UAE, Australia, and New Zealand. It emerged as the first Hindi film to gross over $100 million without a China release.

On its fourth Wednesday, it became the first Hindi film to earn ₹500 crore (equivalent to ₹546 crore or US$58 million in 2026) net in India. On the twenty seventh day of its release, it became the fifth Indian film to gross ₹1000 crore worldwide and only the second Hindi film to do so. On the 37th day of its release, it crossed Baahubali 2: The Conclusion to become the highest grossing Hindi film in India. It also had record collection in South Indian market to grossed total ₹135.5 crore (equivalent to ₹148 crore or US$16 million in 2026) become first Hindi film to achieve 100 crore mark at South market. It sold 35 million tickets which is one of the highest in the history of Indian cinema at that time. Box Office India declared the film as the 25th "All-Time Blockbuster" from the Hindi film industry.

The film has grossed ₹654.28 crore (equivalent to ₹714 crore or US$76 million in 2026) in India and ₹396.02 crore (equivalent to ₹432 crore or US$46 million in 2026) overseas for a worldwide gross collection of ₹1,050.30 crore (equivalent to ₹11 billion or US$120 million in 2026). This made it the fifth-highest-grossing Hindi film, ninth-highest-grossing Indian film, the thirteenth-highest-grossing film in the domestic market and the second highest-grossing of Khan's career.

=== Critical response ===
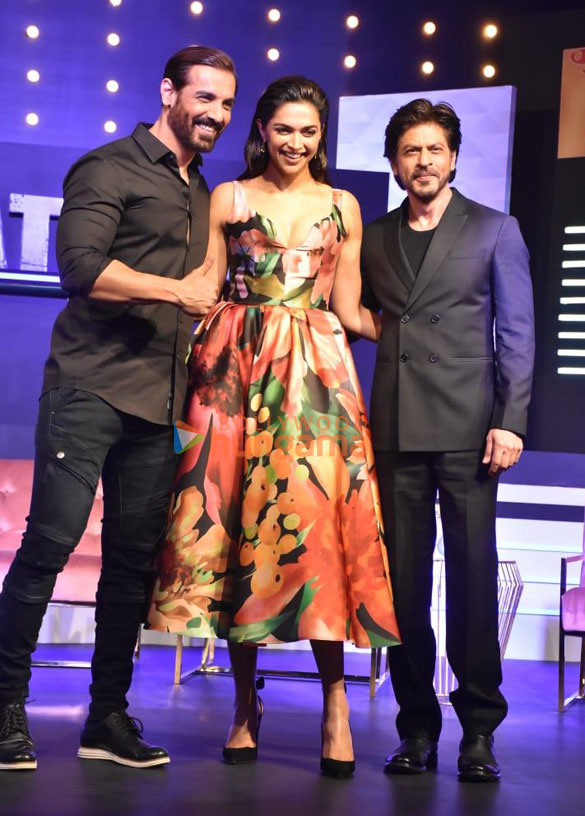
Abraham, Padukone and Khan (l-r) at an event celebrating Pathaan's box-office success

It received generally positive reviews from critics. On the review aggregator website Rotten Tomatoes, the film has an approval rating of 85%, with an average score of 7.1/10, based on reviews from 33 critics. The site's critical consensus reads, "A slightly slapdash but still intoxicating blend of occasionally disparate ingredients, Pathaan offers over-the-top action thrills with Bollywood bells and whistles". Metacritic, which uses a weighted average, assigned the film a score of 47 out of 100, based on 7 critics, indicating "mixed or average" reviews.

==== India ====
Taran Adarsh of Bollywood Hungama rated the film 4.5 out of 5 stars and termed the film a "complete entertainer replete with action, emotions, patriotism, humour, thrill, and of course, the star power of Shah Rukh Khan". Sukanya Verma of Rediff gave the film a rating of 4 out of 5 stars and wrote, "Shah Rukh Khan's weathered intensity, grizzly charisma and trademark wit lends Pathaan's all-out, devil-may-care antics a sense of purpose that evades mindless acts of mayhem". Devesh Sharma of Filmfare rated the film 4 out of 5 stars and called it a "visual spectacle" while also opining that the action choreography was "truly out of this world". Saibal Chatterjee of NDTV rated the film 3.5 out of 5 and said, "Pathaan swings and strikes with all the style and aplomb in the world. It will be a hard act to follow".

Renuka Vyavahare of The Times of India rated the film 3.5 out of 5 stars and wrote, "Pathaan has all the ingredients of a masala potboiler - slow-motion entries, iconic battle of good versus bad and most importantly a sexy-smouldering Shah Rukh Khan, who can fight the good fight on and off the screen". Tanisha Bagchi of The Quint gave the film a rating of 3.5 out of 5 and wrote, "If Hrithik Roshan and Tiger Shroff's showdown in War kept you on the edge of your seats, Shah Rukh and John's fistfights and blows are nothing short of whistle-worthy". Abhimanyu Mathur of DNA India rated the film 3.5 out of 5 stars and praised the performances and score but termed some of the action scenes as "over-the-top and unbelievable". Ritika Handoo of Zee News rated the film 3.5 out of 5 stars and mentioned, "There is not even a single dull moment in this YRF actioner. The action sequences between SRK and John are over-the-top yet mind-numbing".

Tushar Joshi of India Today rated the film 3.5 out of 5 and stated, "Shah Rukh is the heart of Pathaan". Pooja Biraia Jaiswal of The Week rated the film 3.5 out of 5 stars and wrote, "Pathaan is a dishoom-dishoom joy ride between Khan and his perfectly beefed-up antagonist Abraham. The intention is not to let the narrative drive the story forward, but to let the larger-than-life magic of its lead superstars cast its spell". Shubhra Gupta of The Indian Express rated the film 3 out of 5 stars and opined that it has "finally cracked the requirements of an action movie — non-stop action, leavened by glamorous leads, topped by the guy who can save the world, a high-octane set piece and an emo line at a time".

Anna M. M. Vetticad of Firstpost rated the film 2.5 out of 5 and wrote, "Pathaan is so much fun when it's being fun especially with a smashing Salman Khan cameo – that it is tempting to overlook its play-it-safe politics". Sajesh Mohan of Onmanorama stated that "Siddharth Anand's Pathaan lays out a perfect red-carpet entry for Shah Rukh Khan into the YRF Spy Universe with its right formula of high-octane death and logic-defying action sequences seasoned with desh bhakti (patriotism) and qurbani (sacrifice)." Monika Rawal Kukreja of Hindustan Times stated, "Pathaan is your true-blue commercial, masala entertainer that's not trying to send across any message or be a social commentary on the current state of affairs in the country. It's fun, non-fussy and fantastic at the same time". Nandini Ramnath of Scroll.in wrote, "The film's greatest blaster is its hero itself, parleying his well-oiled impishness, time-tested charm and mesmeric screen presence for a cheesy but also entertaining save-the-nation exercise".

==== International ====
Cath Clarke of The Guardian rated the film 3 out of 5 stars and wrote, "This enjoyable high-octane action spy movie from India is possibly the most fun you can currently have at the cinema. Still, the cheers kept coming; the loudest whoop of all when Salman Khan made an entrance as Tiger, a hero from an earlier movie in the series". Conversely, Simon Abrams of TheWrap dismissed it as "an amateurish Indian super-spy thriller that's never as well-executed as it is conceptually goofy and politically dubious".

Owen Gleiberman of Variety was similarly not impressed, terming the film a "sprawling, mountainous tangle of pulp that stacks one genre on top of the next with an arbitrary verve", but picked up the "iconic quality of its stars" Khan and Abraham for praise. Timon Singh of Empire summarised, "Pathaan delivers everything that an Indian blockbuster should: a guaranteed box office draw with Khan, exotic locales, crowd-pleasing cameos, stunning dance numbers and gravity-defying stunts that make the Fast and Furious franchise look restrained."

=== Accolades ===
Award	Ceremony date	Category	Recipients	Result	Ref.
Filmfare Awards	28 January 2024	Best Film	Yash Raj Films	Nominated	
Filmfare Awards	28 January 2024	Best Director	Siddharth Anand	Nominated	
Filmfare Awards	28 January 2024	Best Actress	Deepika Padukone	Nominated	
Filmfare Awards	28 January 2024	Best Story	Siddharth Anand	Nominated	
Filmfare Awards	28 January 2024	Best Screenplay	Shridhar Raghavan	Nominated	
Filmfare Awards	28 January 2024	Best Dialogue	Abbas Tyrewala	Nominated	
Filmfare Awards	28 January 2024	Best Music Director	Vishal–Shekhar	Nominated	
Filmfare Awards	28 January 2024	Best Female Playback Singer	Shilpa Rao – "Besharam Rang"	Won	
Filmfare Awards	28 January 2024	Best Editing	Aarif Shaikh	Nominated	
Filmfare Awards	28 January 2024	Best Choreography	Bosco–Caesar – "Jhoome Jo Pathaan"	Nominated	
Filmfare Awards	28 January 2024	Best Cinematography	Satchith Paulose	Nominated	
Filmfare Awards	28 January 2024	Best Sound Design	Manas Choudhury and Ganesh Gangadharan	Nominated	
Filmfare Awards	28 January 2024	Best Background Score	Sanchit Balhara and Ankit Balhara	Nominated	
Filmfare Awards	28 January 2024	Best Costume Design	Shaleena Nathani, Mamta Anand and Niharika Jolly	Nominated	
Filmfare Awards	28 January 2024	Best Action	Casey O'Neill, Craig Macrae and Sunil Rodrigues	Nominated	
Filmfare Awards	28 January 2024	Best Special Effects	YFX	Nominated	
International Indian Film Academy Awards	28 September 2024	Best Director	Siddharth Anand	Nominated	
International Indian Film Academy Awards	28 September 2024	Best Actress	Deepika Padukone	Nominated	
International Indian Film Academy Awards	28 September 2024	Best Villain	John Abraham	Nominated	
International Indian Film Academy Awards	28 September 2024	Best Music Director	Vishal–Shekhar	Nominated	
International Indian Film Academy Awards	28 September 2024	Best Male Playback Singer	Arijit Singh – "Jhoome Jo Pathaan"	Nominated	
International Indian Film Academy Awards	28 September 2024	Best Female Playback Singer	Shilpa Rao – "Besharam Rang"	Nominated	
International Indian Film Academy Awards	28 September 2024	Best Choreography	Bosco-Caesar – "Jhoome Jo Pathaan"	Won	

== Future ==
=== Tiger vs Pathaan ===
In 2021, it was rumoured that Salman Khan and Shah Rukh Khan would unite for a standalone film. These rumours were confirmed by Salman Khan in December 2021. It was announced on 6 April 2023 under the working title of Tiger vs Pathaan. It was supposed to be the ninth instalment of the shared universe. The project was reported to be directed by Siddharth Anand as announced in April 2023. However, later in February 2026 the project was eventually shelved due to budget constraints.

=== Pathaan 2 ===
As confirmed by the production head, Pathaan 2 is in development with Shah Rukh Khan and Deepika Padukone reprising their roles. The film will be on production with the director of the first film, Siddharth Anand.
