= Fighter (soundtrack) =

- Soundtrack album cover

Soundtrack album by Vishal–Shekhar
- Released: 23 January 2024
- Recorded: 2022–23
- Studios: Future Sound of Bombay, Mumbai
- Genre: Film soundtrack
- Length: 26:11
- Language: Hindi
- Label: T-Series
- Producer: Abhijit Nalani

Vishal–Shekhar chronology
| Pathaan (2023) | Fighter (2024) | Tu Meri Main Tera Main Tera Tu Meri (2025) |

Singles from Fighter
- 1. "Sher Khul Gaye" Released: 15 December 2023; 2. "Ishq Jaisa Kuch" Released: 22 December 2023; 3. "Heer Aasmani" Released: 8 January 2024

Fighter is the soundtrack album composed by Vishal-Shekhar for the 2024 Hindi film of the same name, directed by Siddharth Anand, starring Hrithik Roshan, Deepika Padukone, and Anil Kapoor in lead roles. The original score for the film was composed by Sanchit Balhara and Ankit Balhara. The film was produced by Viacom18 Studios and Marflix Pictures.

The soundtrack album features two distinct sounds: one highlighting a group of pilots in the Air Force, while the other explores themes of patriotism, heartbreak, loss, beauty, and the courage of fighter pilots. The tracks "Sher Khul Gaye," "Ishq Jaisa Kuch," and "Heer Aasmani" served as the lead singles. The majority of the tunes for the original songs were composed within a week's time. The song "Bekaar Dil" was made available for digital download after the film's theatrical release, as it had been removed by the CFBC, India.

The music received mixed reviews, with critics pointing out the awkward placement of the songs in the film, the unusual lyrics, and the original score's lack of cinematic appeal. However, they praised the tracks for being energetic, fast-paced, and romantic. The track "Sher Khul Gaye," a party number, set a record by reaching 50 million views within 24 hours of its release on YouTube. The music album consists of six original songs, with lyrics written by Kumaar. "Fighter Theme" and "Spirit of Fighter" are theme songs, while "Vande Mataram" is considered the film's anthem. The track "Spirit of Fighter" was featured in the film's teaser, and the song "Mitti" includes a version sung by Suresh Wadkar.

== Background ==
According to Vishal Dadlani, the majority of the tunes were composed within a week of the film's script narration. He explained that the project's "natural energy" contributed to their creative process. In an interview with Asian Variety TV Network, after Fighter's narration, they began creating music on the spot. Knowing that Hrithik Roshan would be starring in the film, they subconsciously started designing dance tunes. In an interview with DNA India, Shekhar Ravjiani mentioned that they kept the music of Fighter quite edgy—a combination of electro and dance—while ensuring the tunes remained as desi and floaty as possible. In an interview with Asian Sunday, Dadlani explained that the soundtrack features two distinct types of sound: one representing the camaraderie of the group of pilots at the Air Force Academy, initially while training in the air; and the other delving into deeper emotions—patriotism, heartbreak, loss, beauty, courage, and the truth of fighter pilots.

"Sher Khul Gaye" is a party track featured during a celebration among a group of pilots marking a milestone. According to Dadlani and Ravjiani, the track embodies the spirit of pilots as "the kings (metaphorically, tigers) of the world." Director Siddharth Anand acknowledged that the notes, scanning, and progressions of "Sher Khul Gaye" were similar to the 1977 single Stayin' Alive, but emphasized that it was neither inspired by nor plagiarized from the song. When writing two deep soul tracks, "Mitti" and "Dil Banaane Waaleya," singer KK was the first choice for the vocals. However, they were unable to record with him due to his untimely demise.

In an interview with Hindustan Times, Anand explained that the theme of "Heer Aasmani" revolves around an Air Force pilot expressing their unconditional love for the skies. He added that the track is modern in its presentation, featuring guitar riffs and rustic vocals by singer B Praak. The song was dedicated to the special squad of Air Dragons coming together, showcasing the crew's bonding both during briefing and training sessions, as well as during their downtime. The track "Mitti" is patriotic and features at a point in the film where the team of fighter pilots suffers a loss.

The track "Spirit of Fighter" was written for the background score of the film and was featured in the teaser. The songs "Ishq Jaisa Kuch" and "Bekaar Dil" were removed from the film's footage as they were deemed 'explicit' for the Indian audience. However, the former was included in the end credits of the Indian theatrical prints, while both tracks were present in the international prints.

== Music videos ==
The song "Sher Khul Gaye" was released as the first single from the film on 15 December 2023. It is a party track that set a record by reaching 50 million views within 24 hours on YouTube. The song drew comparisons to "Stayin' Alive" by the Bee Gees and "Dynamite" by BTS. Padukone wears a polka-dotted black dress and matches the dance steps with Roshan. Anil Kapoor makes a grand entry, and the song was choreographed by Bosco and Caesar.

The second single from the soundtrack, "Ishq Jaisa Kuch," was released on 22 December 2023. The song begins with Roshan walking bare-chested from the sea, while Padukone dons a black monokini. Later in the song, the leading duo is seen in beach and party-ready outfits, with Padukone wearing a gold and silver embellished mini skirt and bralette-style top by Paco Rabanne.

The third single, "Heer Aasmani," was released on 15 January 2024. The song was filmed in the snowy regions of Jammu and Kashmir, where the crew faced difficulties in syncing lip movements due to the freezing temperatures.

== Critical response ==
Reviewing for The Guardian, Phuong Lee criticized the tracks and their picturization, stating: "Racy musical interludes – item songs – are haphazardly inserted throughout; at one point, a flight mission awkwardly cuts to an out-of-place daydream in which the two scantily clad stars groove to a sizzling tune in some distant seaside resort." Simon Abrams of RogerEbert.com commented that, "A representatively energetic, but unexceptional musical number features lyrics like 'The lions are on the prowl tonight,' with the music numbers being pretty romantic." Sakshi Thirani of Common Sense Media remarked, "The music and dance sequences, such a staple in Bollywood cinema, feel random and irritating instead of entertaining."

Umesh Punwani of Koimoi stated, "Songs appearing out of nowhere in between an important mission are as intrusive as you'd expect them to be." The Indian Express reviewed the track "Ishq Jaisa Kuch," saying, "The song might grow on the audience, but the initial impact left by Deepika and Hrithik is simply unmissable." Livemint quoted, "Sanchit and Ankit Balhara’s score is as earwormy as their work on Pathaan." Critics at Bollywood Hungama stated that the music doesn't work as intended and is forgettable. They described "Sher Khul Gaye" as catchy, while "Heer Aasmani" and "Dil Banaane Waaleya" were noted as being woven into the narrative. The background score was praised for its "big-screen cinematic appeal." In his review for Times Internet, Aman Kumar remarked, "Though the music of Fighter didn’t catch much attention, 'Mitti' and 'Heer Aasmani' will surely stay with you for a while."

== Track listing ==
The music of the film was released on 23 January 2024. The original soundtrack consists of six songs, with the first three released as singles in that order. The two theme tracks were released as "Fighter - Single" on 1 December 2023. After the film's release, the track "Mitti" was released as a single with vocals by Suresh Wadkar. Additionally, the film's anthem song, "Vande Mataram," was released on 25 January 2024.

=== Standard Edition ===
All lyrics are written by Kumaar, except where noted.

Fighter (Original Motion Picture Soundtrack)
| No. | Title | Singer(s) | Length |
|---|---|---|---|
| 1. | "Sher Khul Gaye" | Vishal Dadlani, Neeraj Shridhar, Benny Dayal, Shilpa Rao | 3:00 |
| 2. | "Ishq Jaisa Kuch" | Vishal Dadlani, Jubin Nautiyal, Shilpa Rao, Mellow D | 2:49 |
| 3. | "Heer Aasmani" | B Praak, Vishal Dadlani, Kamaal Khan | 3:24 |
| 4. | "Dil Banaane Waaleya" | Arijit Singh, Jonita Gandhi, Vishal Mishra, Shekhar Ravjiani | 3:44 |
| 5. | "Mitti" | Suresh Wadkar, Srinivas, Jubin Nautiyal, Ash King | 3:34 |
| 6. | "Bekaar Dil" | Vishal Mishra, Shilpa Rao, Diljit Dosanjh, Aziz Naza | 3:29 |
| Total length: | | | 20:00 |

=== Singles ===
Fighter - Single
| No. | Title | Artist(s) | Length |
|---|---|---|---|
| 1. | "Fighter Theme" | (Instrumental) | 0:23 |
| 2. | "Spirit of Fighter" | (Instrumental) | 0:57 |
| Total length: | | | 1:00 |

All lyrics are written by Kumaar.

Mitti (Suresh Wadkar Version) - Single
| No. | Title | Artist(s) | Length |
|---|---|---|---|
| 1. | "Mitti (Suresh Wadkar Version)" | Suresh Wadkar | 3:33 |

All lyrics are written by Bankim Chandra Chatterjee and Kumaar

Vande Mataram (The Fighter Anthem) - Single
| No. | Title | Artist(s) | Length |
|---|---|---|---|
| 1. | "Vande Mataram (The Fighter Anthem)" | Vishal Dadlani, Ash King, Rahul Saxena, Srinivas, Ustad Rashid Khan, Sid Sriram, Mahesh Kale, Kunal Ganjawala | 2:38 |

Notes

- "Dil Chah Raha" Hai is alternately referred as "Bekaar Dil" on music download platform.

== Album credits ==
All credits are adapted from the liner notes of the album.

- Kumaar - Lyrics (All tracks)
- Mellow D - Lyrics (Track 1, 2), vocals (Track 2)
- Abhijit Nalani - Record Producer (All tracks)
- Karan Kanchan - Additional Music Producer (Track 2)
- Eric Pillai - Audio Mixing (All tracks)
- Ganesh Gangadharan - Sound Design (All tracks)
- Pritam Das - Sound Design (All tracks)
- Dipesh Verma - Tabla (Track 1)
- Iqbal Azad - Dhol (Track 1)
- Rhythm Shaw - Violas (Track 1, 2, 4), Mohan Veenas (Track 2, 4)
- Warren Mendonsa - Piano (Track 3)
- Aatur Soni - Drums (Track 4)
- Leo Olavio Velho - Cello (Track 5)
- Sujan Chettri - Cello(Track 5)
