= Anku Pande =

Indian film producer

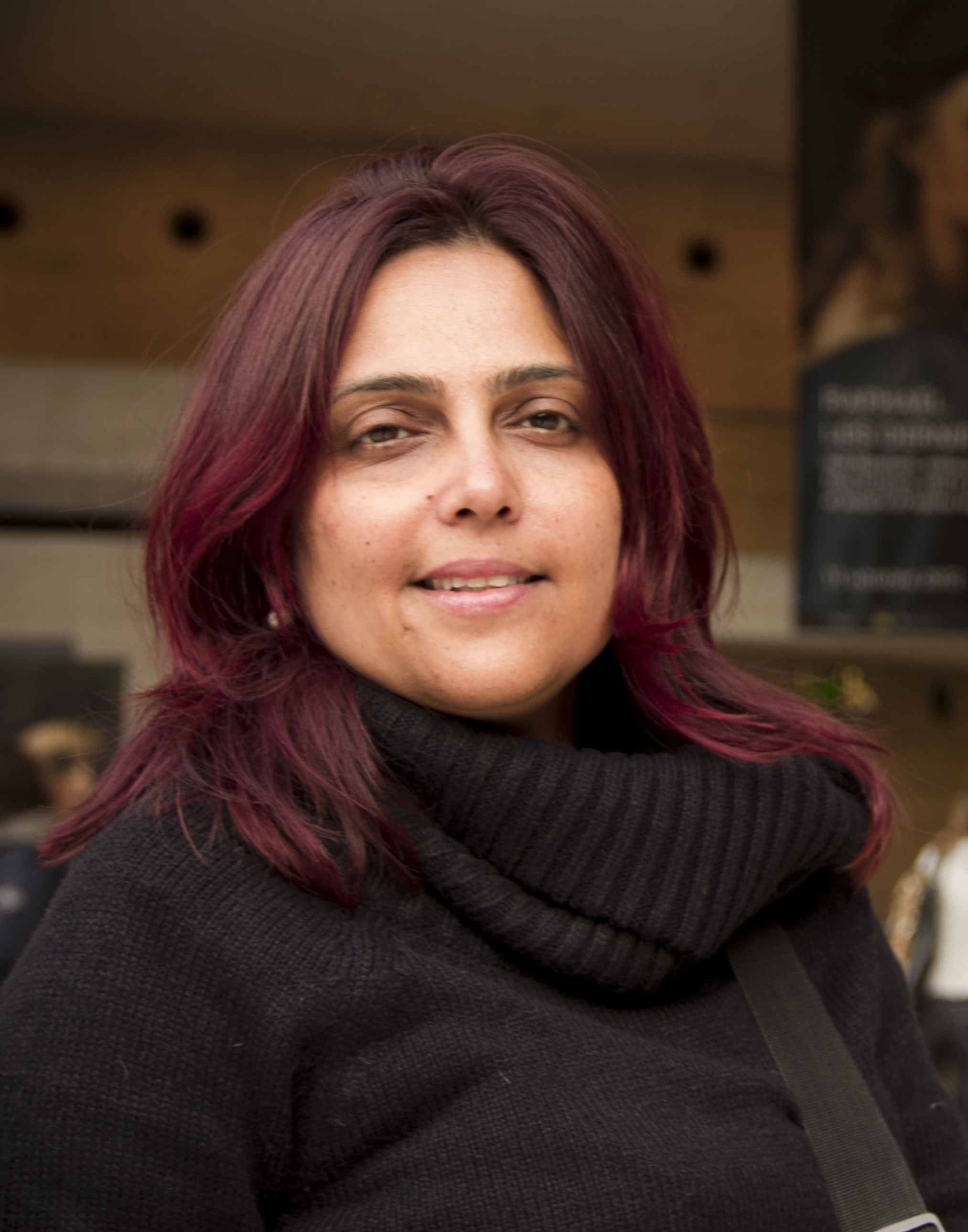
- Anku Pande
- Born: Anku Pande; 13 November 1970 (age 55); Visakhapatnam, Andhra Pradhesh, India
- Occupation: Filmmaker
- Years active: 1994 to present

Anku Pande (born Vishakhapatnam, 13 November 1970) is a film producer from Nainital, Uttarakhand in India.

Pande has been responsible for introducing new talent and franchises into the industry as creative head of Viacom18 Motion Pictures.

She has worked across all media and entertainment platforms. She started her career as an editor and then went on to direct and produce various documentaries and television commercials.

She is an alumna of The American Film Institute, Los Angeles.

== Early life ==
Anku did her schooling from St. Mary's Convent High School, Nainital and college from St. Bede's College, Shimla.

== Career ==
She moved to Delhi in 1994 and started her career under Dileep Padgaonkar and Vinod Dua as an assistant producer and reporter. From there she moved on to work for Fremantle India. She then joined the business Channel BITV as an editor and was one of the first few to be trained to use the Grass Valley Switcher and edit using Avid. After BITV she worked freelance as director and editor for corporate films, edited shows for TV, directed and produced commercials and documentaries. She then moved to Los Angeles to do her master's degree in film producing at the American Film Institute. On her return to India in the year 2006, she moved to Mumbai and started her film career with Ram Gopal Varma Productions where she worked as an Executive Producer after which she went on to do production work with national and international film studios, setting up local productions for Warner Brothers India.

Pande was the Chief Creative Officer for Balaji Telefilms group subsidiary ALTBalaji. She then moved to Viacom18 Motion Pictures as their Creative and Development Head. She also started Tipping Point Films to focus on new talent and smaller budget movies for Viacom18 Motion Pictures. She sourced Ragini MMS for ALTBalaji, and approved Gangs of Wasseypur, Shaitan, Tanu Weds Manu and Pyaar Ka Punchnama amongst others for Viacom18 Motion Pictures.

Since 2013, Pande has been developing and producing films in her production company Manomay Motion Pictures Pvt Ltd

In 2020, she Produced a Horror/Mystery film, Kaali Khuhi, starring Shabana Azmi and Sanjeeda Sheikh. The film is a Netflix original.

Pande is one of the Producers of the Hrithik Roshan, Deepika Padukone starrer Fighter which released theatrically on 25 January 2024.

== Filmography ==
Year	Title	Role	Distributor
1997	Garhwal A home in the Mountains	Producer Director	Paro Film Festival Bhutan
1997	Kadam Kadam Badhaye Ja	Producer Director	Indian Army
1998	Policy Maker	Producer Director	Indian Army
2004	Hollywood Heroes with Ashok Amritraj	Producer Director	The History Channel
2010	Cutting Carbon Footprint	Executive producer	National Geographic Channel
2011	Shabri	Executive producer	Reliance Entertainment
2020	Kaali Khuhi	Producer	Netflix
2024	Fighter	Producer	Viacom 18 Motion Pictures

Viacom 18 Motion Pictures

Year	Title	Role	Notes
2011	Pyaar Ka Panchnama	Development and Creative Head for Viacom18 Motion Pictures	Greenlight to Release
2011	Tanu Weds Manu	Development and Creative Head for Viacom18 Motion Pictures	Greenlight to Release
2011	Shaitan	Development and Creative Head for Viacom18 Motion Pictures greenlit & developed the film	Greenlight to Release
2012	Kahani	Development and Creative Head for Viacom18 Motion Pictures	Greenlit the acquisition
2012	Gangs of Wasseypur	Development and Creative Head for Viacom18 Motion Pictures	Greenlighting to supervision of production
2013	Inkaar	Development and Creative Head for Viacom18 Motion Pictures	Greenlighting to Supervision of Production
2013	Chasmebadoor	Development and Creative Head for Viacom18 Motion Pictures	Development to supervision of production
