= Rishabh Sawhney =

Indian actor

- Born: New Delhi, India
- Citizenship: Indian
- Occupations: Actor, Model
- Years active: 2017–present
- Known for: Fighter (2024)

Rishabh Sawhney is an Indian actor and former model who appears in Hindi-language films and web series. He portrayed Azhar Akhtar, an antagonist in the 2024 action film Fighter, directed by Siddharth Anand. He previously appeared as Mehmood in the 2021 web series The Empire.

== Career ==
Rishabh began his professional career as a fashion model. He made his screen acting debut in the historical web series The Empire (2021), in which he played Mehmood, a brother of Babur. In addition to acting, he also worked as a casting assistant on the series and later held the same crew role in the web series Kaun Banegi Shikharwati and Bestseller.

In 2024, he played a role as an antagonist in Fighter (2024), an aerial-action film starring Hrithik Roshan, Deepika Padukone, and Anil Kapoor. In 2025, he was cast as a teacher in Echoes of Valour, directed by Indira Dhar and starring Divya Dutta and Neeraj Kabi. The film was screened at the Venice International Film Festival.

== Filmography ==
Year	Title	Role	Language	Notes
2021	The Empire	Mehmood	Hindi	
2024	Fighter	Azhar Akhtar	Hindi	
2025	Echoes of Valour		Hindi	
2026	Nagabandham: The Secret Treasure	Ali /Ahmad Shah Abdali	Telugu	

== Recognition ==
- 2024: Lions Gold Awards 2024
- 2024: Mid Day Showbiz Awards 2024
- 2025: Iconic Gold Awards 2025
