= Padgaonkar =

Padgaonkar is a surname. People with the surname include:

- Dileep Padgaonkar
- Mangesh Padgaonkar
- Prakash Padgaonkar
