= Fighter (2024 film) =

2024 Indian film by Siddharth Anand

- Theatrical release poster
- Directed by: Siddharth Anand
- Screenplay by: Ramon Chibb
- Dialogues by: Hussain Dalal; Abbas Dalal
- Story by: Siddharth Anand; Ramon Chibb
- Produced by: Mamta Anand; Siddharth Anand; Ramon Chibb; Anku Pande; Kevin Vaz; Ajit Andhare
- Starring: Hrithik Roshan; Deepika Padukone; Anil Kapoor; Karan Singh Grover; Akshay Oberoi
- Cinematography: Satchith Paulose
- Edited by: Aarif Sheikh
- Music by: Songs: Vishal–Shekhar; Score: Sanchit Balhara and Ankit Balhara
- Production companies: Viacom18 Studios; Marflix Pictures; Prime Focus Studios
- Distributed by: Viacom18 Studios
- Release date: 25 January 2024
- Running time: 166 minutes
- Country: India
- Language: Hindi
- Budget: ₹250 crore
- Box office: est. ₹344.46 crore

Fighter is a 2024 Indian Hindi-language aerial action film directed by Siddharth Anand and produced by his production company Marflix Pictures and Viacom18 Studios. It stars Hrithik Roshan, Deepika Padukone, Anil Kapoor, Karan Singh Grover, and Akshay Oberoi. The first instalment of a planned aerial action franchise, the film depicts a series of military incidents between India and Pakistan in 2019, covering the Pulwama attack, the 2019 Balakot airstrike, and the India–Pakistan border skirmishes.

Announced in January 2021, it is Anand's first production venture and third collaboration with Roshan after Bang Bang! (2014) and War (2019). Principal photography began in November 2022, and took place across Assam, Hyderabad, Jammu and Kashmir, and Mumbai. Real-life Indian Air Force personnel were involved in the film's production. The soundtrack was composed by Vishal–Shekhar, with a film score by Sanchit Balhara and Ankit Balhara. The visual effects were handled by DNEG.

Fighter was theatrically released on 25 January 2024, coinciding with the Indian Republic Day weekend. It received mixed-to-positive reviews from critics, and grossed ₹344.46 crore (US$36 million) worldwide to emerge as the eighth highest-grossing Indian film of 2024 and fourth highest-grossing Hindi film of 2024.

== Plot ==
In Srinagar, Jammu and Kashmir, a terrorist organisation led by Azhar Akhtar plans to attack India by targeting the Srinagar Air Force Station base of the Indian Air Force. Group captain Rakesh "Rocky" Jai Singh is assigned to counter the threat and forms a team called the "Air Dragons", consisting of skilled fighter pilots. The team includes squadron leaders Shamsher "Patty" Pathania, Minal "Minni" Rathore, Sartaj "Taj" Gill, Basheer "Bash" Khan, Rajan "Unni" Unnithan, and Sukhdeep "Sukhi" Singh. During training, the team members bond, and Minni develops romantic feelings for Patty. However, Patty is haunted by his past after losing his fiancée during a previous mission. The team later learns about an attack on CRPF soldiers in Pulwama that was organised by Akhtar.

In response, the Indian Air Force, along with RAW agent Zareena Begum, plans a counterattack on Akhtar's base in Balakot. Despite succeeding in the mission, the aftermath causes tensions between India and Pakistan. As a result, the Pakistan Air Force launches a retaliatory attack on the Indian base. Despite Rocky's orders, Patty, Taj, and Bash cross the Line of Control. Taj and Bash's aircraft is shot down by Pakistan Air Force pilots, leading to their capture. Following a court of inquiry, Rocky removes Patty from the Air Dragons team. Patty is then posted as a flying instructor at the Air Force Academy in Hyderabad. Rocky also reveals to Minni that he holds a grudge against Patty for allowing his fiancée, Naina Jai Singh, call sign Enjay (who is revealed to be Rocky's younger sister), to die during a previous rescue mission. At the AFA, Patty assists a flight cadet, Neha Joshi (who also uses the similar call sign NJ), in landing safely after she panics and loses control of her aircraft during her first solo flight. He feels a sense of atonement after helping Neha and subsequently pays special attention to her training.

The Government of Pakistan announces that Taj and Bash will be escorted safely back to India. However, the Air Dragons are shocked when the chopper sent to receive Taj and Bash returns carrying only Bash's dead body. Sukhi informs Patty that Bash was brutally murdered by Akhtar and that he has imprisoned a severely injured Taj. Determined to rescue him, Patty and Rocky defy orders and join a covert mission. The team successfully infiltrates enemy territory, allowing Patty to rescue Taj and kill Akhtar. After landing, Patty and Minni embrace in celebration of their victory.

== Cast ==
- Hrithik Roshan as Squadron Leader Shamsher "Patty" Pathania
- Deepika Padukone as Squadron Leader Minal "Minni" Rathore
- Anil Kapoor as Group Captain Rakesh "Rocky" Jaisingh, commanding officer of Air Dragons Unit
- Karan Singh Grover as Squadron Leader Sartaj "Taj" Gill
- Akshay Oberoi as Squadron Leader Basheer "Bash" Khan
- Rishabh Sawhney as Azhar Akhtar
- Sanjeeda Sheikh as Saachi Gill, Taj's wife
- Ashutosh Rana as Abhijeet Rathore, Minni's father (special appearance)
- Geeta Agarwal Sharma as Usha Rathore, Minni's mother
- Talat Aziz as Mr. Pathania, Patty's father
- Sharib Hashmi as Wing Commander Varthaman, Ilyushin Il-76 Pilot
- Ramon Chibb as Air Commodore Abhinder "Abhi" Bali, Chief Instructor, Air Force Academy
- Sanjeev Jaiswal as Majeed Khan
- Baveen Singh as Squadron Leader Sukhdeep "Sukhi" Singh
- Mahesh Shetty as Squadron Leader Rajan "Unni" Unnithan
- Seerat Mast as Squadron Leader Naina "Enjay" Jaisingh, Rocky's sister and Patty's deceased fiancée
- Sanjiv Chopra as Air Marshal Rohan Rawal, AOC in C Western Air Command
- Nishant Kkhanduja as Flying Officer Manoj "Birdie" Bhardwaj
- Karan Sharma as Flying Officer Ajeet "Jeet" Deshpande
- Chandan K Anand as Wing Commander Harish "Nauty" Nautiyal
- Harnam Singh Sandhu as Squadron Leader Sanjay Mathur
- Indhu Reddy as Flight Lieutenant Rajshree Mehta
- Aditi Sandhya Sharma as Flight Cadet Neha "NJ" Joshi
- Hrushi Poddar as Flight Cadet Sunil
- Mushtaq Kak as Maulana Maqsood Abrar
- Vinay Varma as Air Commodore Debajyoti "Debu" Biswas, AOC, Air Force Station, Srinagar
- Lokesh Batta as Squadron Leader Sandeep "Sandy" Kumar
- Himani Sahani as Squadron Leader Tanya Aggarwal
- Harish Khatri as Prime Minister of India
- Chandra Shekhar Dutta as RAW agent Yafeth Salim a.k.a. Zareena Begum (Voice dubbed by Uplaksh Kochhar)
- Samvedna Suwalka as Bela Unnithan, Unni's wife
- Geeta Sodhi as Mrs. Gill, Taj's mother
- Gurmeet Chawla as Chief of the Air Staff
- Behzaad Khan as Wing Commander Imran Rasool "Red Nose"

== Production ==
=== Development ===
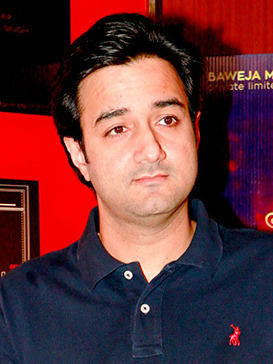
Fighter director Siddharth Anand in 2016

Siddharth Anand narrated the idea of making a big-budget action thriller against the backdrop of fighter jets while shooting the film War (2019). Hrithik Roshan loved the basic premise of the story. During the COVID-19 lockdown in India, Anand worked on developing the story further and narrated it to Roshan, who later confirmed it for the film. In December 2020, it was reported that Siddharth Anand and Hrithik Roshan are going to reunite for a film after War (2019).

Fighter was officially announced on 10 January 2021, on the occasion of Hrithik Roshan's birthday. The film is the India's first aerial action film. It is the first installment in its franchise. The film is produced by Siddharth Anand, Mamta Anand, Ramon Chibb, Anku Pande, Kevin Vaz and Ajit Andhare, under banners Viacom18 Studios and Marflix Pictures. The film was made on a budget of ₹250 crore.

The film is designed for a global audience and would involve the use of the latest technology and filming techniques.

=== Pre-production ===
Ramon Chibb, filmmaker and writer, wrote the story along with Siddharth Anand. Later, Chibb wrote the screenplay of the film under the supervision of Anand and Hrithik Roshan. Akshay Oberoi said that the film has "much heavier" action scenes than Pathaan (2023). Anand further retained most of his norm technicians including cinematographer Satchith Paulose, editor Aarif Sheikh, stunt choreographer SeYeong Oh, and action director Sunil Rodrigues. Raj Khatri designed posters of the film.

In September 2022, Roshan started taking workshops and continued 12-week simulator training and learned the nuances of playing a fighter jet pilot. His training was supervised by Kris Gethin, developing his abdominal muscles and losing weight. In November 2022, he visited the IAF air base in Tezpur, Assam. In the next phase, he went to the Air Force Academy in Dundigal. In both these establishments he spent time with the officers, airmen and flight cadets to observe their demeanour and understand the way that they function.

Real-life Indian Air Force personnel, including officers and flight cadets, have worked on the film. Besides the Air Force personnel from the air base in Tezpur and Dundigal Air Force Academy near Hyderabad, the ceremonial guard of the IAF was brought in to Mumbai from Air Headquarters (Air HQ) in Delhi for shooting an important scene.

=== Casting ===
In January 2021, Deepika Padukone and Hrithik Roshan were officially announced as the leads, marking their maiden film together. Roshan portrays Patty, an air force officer. Roshan revealed his character as "young, spontaneous and short-tempered". Padukone also plays an air force officer and has several action sequences in the film. Both Padukone and Roshan took martial arts training for their roles. Anil Kapoor joined the cast in December 2021. Karan Singh Grover and Akshay Oberoi were roped in by November 2022. In March 2023, Talat Aziz joined the cast to play role of Patty's father in the film. In May 2023, Sanjeeda Sheikh was confirmed to play a key role.

=== Filming ===
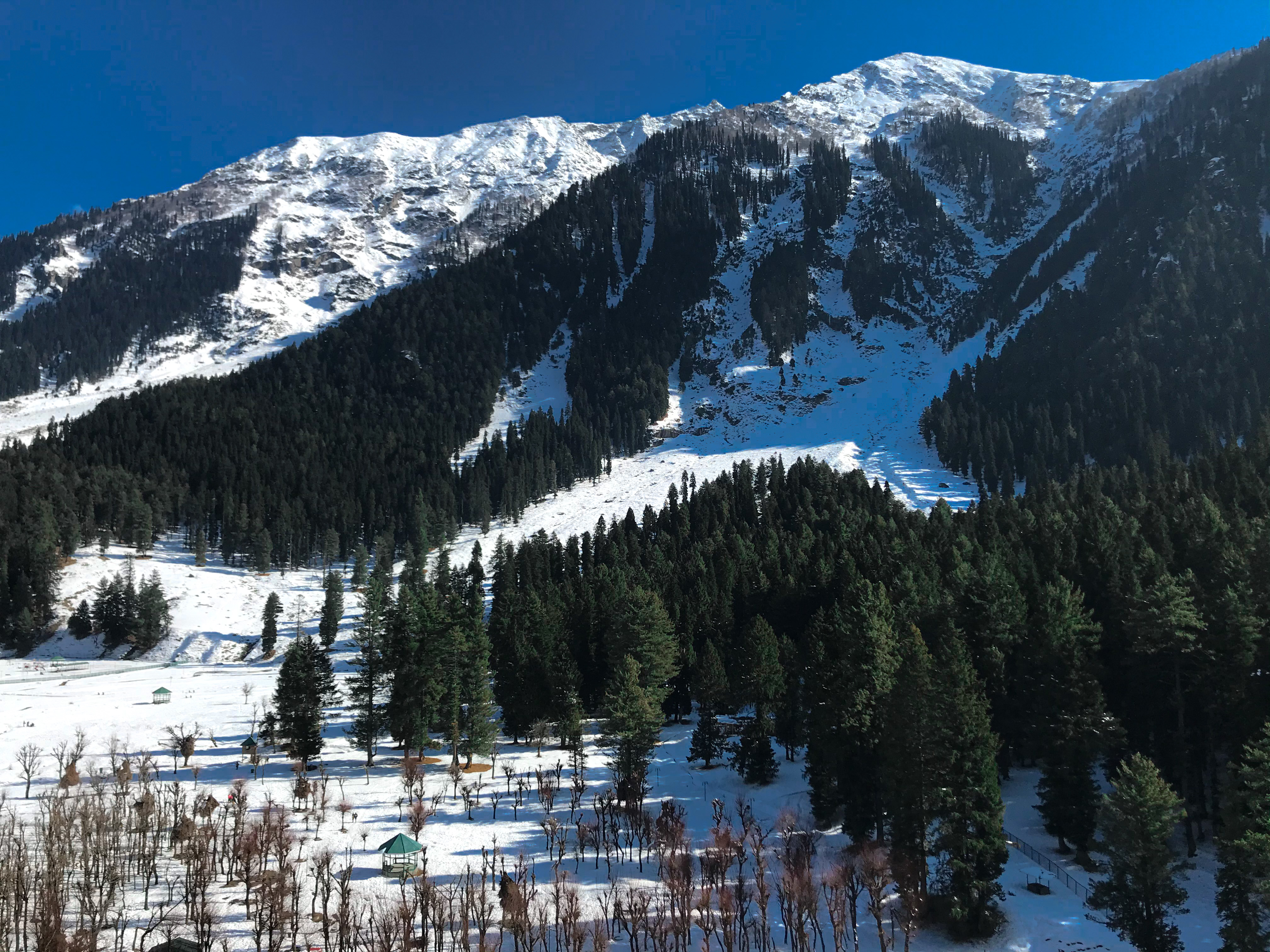
Part of the film was shot at Pahalgam, Jammu and Kashmir.

Principal photography began on 14 November 2022 in Assam. Roshan, Padukone, and Kapoor joined in the schedule, that took place in Tezpur Air Force Station. The team returned to Mumbai on 28 November 2022 after wrapping the 10-day first schedule in Assam.

For the second schedule, the team moved to Jammu and Kashmir on 6 February 2023. Akshay Oberoi also joined this schedule. The team returned to Mumbai on 12 February, after filming at Pahalgam in Jammu and Kashmir, where a song and few action sequences choreographed by Sunil Rodrigues, were shot.

The third schedule was held at the Indian Air Force Academy at Dundigal in Hyderabad, to shoot Roshan's character, as an Air Force cadet undergoing training. The third schedule was wrapped in Hyderabad on 6 March.

On 19 March, Roshan began filming in a Chembur bungalow for the fourth schedule, in Mumbai. In this schedule, Talat Aziz joined, and a few emotional scenes were shot. It was reported that the month-long schedule would end on 24 April. Kapoor, via Instagram, shared a behind-the-scenes video of his workout in -110 degrees Celsius for the schedule. The team also shot a 25-minute long climactic scene that includes an action sequence, which reportedly took 120 hours (5 days) to shoot.

For the next schedule, production designer Rajat Poddarr and his team built an expensive set that housed the interiors of an air force base, classrooms, and offices at Yash Raj Studios, in Mumbai. On 14 May, the next schedule was started with Padukone, Roshan, Kapoor and Grover joining the schedule. On 19 May, the team shot combination scenes of Padukone and Kapoor at Mysore Colony, Chembur over 3 days. From 22 May, emotional scenes between Padukone and Roshan were shot in Chandivali, with only 20–30 extras to avoid the film's footage leaks online.

The Mumbai schedule was completed in mid-June. Roshan shot inside an Sukhoi Su-30MKI for over 12 days. Dramatic scenes between Roshan and Kapoor was shot in late August in Mumbai. In early September, a song featuring Roshan, Padukone, along with the entire cast, choreographed by the duo Bosco–Caesar, was shot at Yash Raj Studios. Later in early October, the team wrapped two songs in Sardinia, Italy. Principal photography wrapped on 30 October 2023 at Yash Raj Studios, with filming having lasted 87 working days.

=== Post-production ===
Post-production for the film began in early June 2023, once the film had completed its shooting and was going for six months, as the film involved extensive computer graphics and visual effects. The VFX work of the film was done by DNEG.

== Soundtrack ==
The soundtrack was composed by Vishal–Shekhar while the film score was composed by Sanchit Balhara and Ankit Balhara. The album consists of six songs. The music rights were acquired by T-Series. The first single, titled "Sher Khul Gaye," was released on 15 December 2023. The second single titled "Ishq Jaisa Kuch" was released on 22 December 2023. The third single titled "Heer Aasmani" was released on 8 January 2024.

== Marketing and release ==
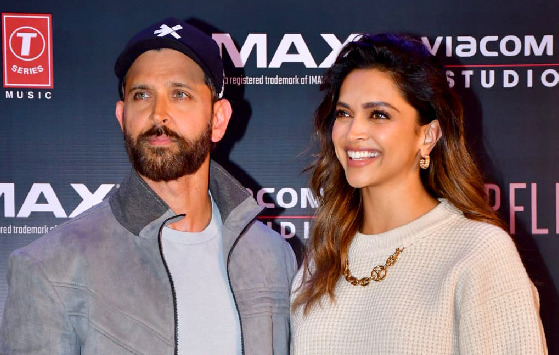
Roshan and Padukone promoting the film in 2024

The teaser of the film was released on 8 December 2023. The official trailer of the film was released on 15 January 2024.

Fighter was released on 25 January 2024, coinciding with the Republic Day. Earlier in January 2021, it was announced that the film was going to release on 30 September 2022. In October 2022, the release date was announced as 25 January 2024. The film was banned across the countries of the GCC.

=== Home media ===
The film premiered on Netflix on 21 March 2024.

== Reception ==
=== Box office ===
Fighter has grossed ₹244.7 crore (US$25 million) in India, with a further ₹99.76 crore (US$10 million) in overseas, for a worldwide total of ₹344.46 crore (US$36 million). On its opening weekend, it topped the global box-office with a gross of $25 million, including debuting at the top-spot at the New Zealand box-office. It was a commercial success at the box-office.

=== Critical response ===
Fighter received mixed-to-positive reviews from critics, with particular criticism going towards its script. On the review aggregator website Rotten Tomatoes, 38% of 26 critics' reviews are positive, with an average rating of 5.7/10. Metacritic, which uses a weighted average, assigned the film a score of 63 out of 100, based on 4 critics, indicating "generally favorable" reviews.

India Today gave the film 4/5 stars and praised the action and performances. The Times of India gave the film 3.5/5 stars praising the performances and technical aspects. NDTV gave the film 2.5/5 stars praising the technical aspects but criticized the cliched storyline. Hindustan Times wrote "Watch Fighter for a pure paisa vasool experience, good looking performances and some gravity defying aerial action that won't give you a headache but leave you with a sense of pride." The Indian Express gave the film 2.5/5 stars and criticized the film's excessive jingoism. Film Companion gave a negative review criticising the storyline and dialogues.

== Accolades ==
Year	Award	Category	Nominee/Work	Result	Ref.
2025	25th IIFA Awards	Best Director	Siddharth Anand	Nominated	
2025	25th IIFA Awards	Best Female Playback Singer	Shilpa Rao for "Ishq Jaisa Kuch"	Nominated	

== Future ==
While writing the script, Anand decided to make it a franchise. In May 2025, it was reported that production of the sequel film Fighter 2 would begin after Anand finished shooting and production of King.
