= Jewel Thief (2025 film) =

2025 Indian film by Kookie Gulati & Robbie Grewal

Jewel Thief – The Heist Begins
- Official release poster
- Directed by: Kookie Gulati; Robbie Grewal
- Screenplay by: David Logan
- Dialogues by: Sumit Arora
- Produced by: Siddharth Anand; Mamta Anand
- Starring: Saif Ali Khan; Jaideep Ahlawat; Nikita Dutta; Kunal Kapoor
- Cinematography: Jishnu Bhattacharjee
- Edited by: Aarif Sheikh
- Music by: Score: Shezan Shaikh; Songs: Sachin–Jigar; OAFF–Savera; Soundtrek–Anis Ali Sabri
- Production company: Marflix Pictures
- Distributed by: Netflix
- Release date: 25 April 2025
- Running time: 118 minutes
- Country: India
- Language: Hindi

Jewel Thief – The Heist Begins is a 2025 Indian Hindi-language heist action thriller film directed by Kookie Gulati and Robbie Grewal. Produced by Marflix Pictures, it stars Saif Ali Khan, Jaideep Ahlawat, Nikita Dutta and Kunal Kapoor. The film was premiered on Netflix on 25 April 2025.

== Plot ==
Rehan Roy is an infamous jewel thief, known across the globe for pulling off high-profile heists. Currently in Budapest, he is under constant surveillance by two Indian Secret Service agents who report to Officer Vikram Patel, determined to uncover Rehan's next move. Rehan's life takes a sharp turn when his younger brother, Avi Roy, arrives with troubling news. Back in India, their father, renowned doctor Jayant Roy—who had expelled Rehan from the family years ago for his criminal activities—is now in grave danger. A powerful art collector, Rajan Aulakh, has framed both Avi and Dr. Roy in a money laundering scandal involving terrorist-linked funds, as blackmail to force Rehan into stealing a priceless gem called the Red Sun, currently displayed at an exhibition in Mumbai by the wealthy Prince Gamunu.

Determined to save his father, Rehan surrenders to the Indian agents in Budapest and requests extradition to India. En route, he drugs the agents and assumes one of their identities to travel unnoticed to Mumbai. There, he meets Rajan, who hosts him in his opulent mansion and lays out the details of the heist. Rehan also encounters Farah, Rajan's partner, and quickly notices she's a victim of Rajan's abuse. A quiet romance begins to bloom between them.

Meanwhile, Rajan secretly reconnects with Moosa, a gangster with whom he shares a rocky past. The two agree to work together, planning to eliminate Rehan after the heist and split the proceeds. Rehan, unaware of their betrayal, begins scouting the museum. But when he senses Officer Vikram's presence during the attempted heist, he aborts and escapes.

Despite Rajan's fury, Rehan persuades him to try again. However, Prince Gamunu, learning of the theft attempt, decides to leave India immediately—with the Red Sun—on a commercial flight due to technical issues on his private jet. Rehan proposes the heist take place mid-air. Boarding the same flight with Rajan, Farah, and Rajan's henchman Salim, Rehan stages the next phase. Farah poisons the prince to create chaos, and Rehan, posing as a doctor, convinces the flight crew to take him to the cockpit. There, he threatens the pilot—whose family he claims to have kidnapped—and orders an emergency landing in Istanbul's Central Park, where a secret makeshift runway awaits. While in flight, Rehan and Rajan break into the cargo hold and retrieve the locked case containing the gem. Rehan succeeds in accessing the Red Sun, just as the plane lands on the grassy runway. They escape through underground tunnels moments before the police, led by Vikram, arrive.

At Rajan's Istanbul hideout, Rehan hands over the gem, which Rajan quickly sends to Moosa. Moosa then orders Rehan's execution. During a final meeting under the guise of celebrating success, Rehan poisons Salim and confronts Rajan with shocking revelations: every twist in the plan was orchestrated by Rehan—sabotaging the prince's jet, tipping off Vikram, and even planting the fake gem. The real Red Sun, Rehan reveals, was hidden in another passenger's luggage during the flight and swapped out at the last moment. Rehan incapacitates Rajan, ties him up, opens a gas valve in the kitchen, tosses him a cigarette, and leaves with documents that clear his father's name. Later, Moosa who discovered that the gem is fake, arrives to confront Rajan. As tempers flare, Rajan, still bound, asks for a final cigarette. When Moosa lights it for him, the mansion explodes, killing them both.

The film ends with Rehan in possession of the real Red Sun, reuniting with Farah as they plan their next thrilling heist. Vikram continues his pursuit, but Rehan once again vanishes into the shadows—leaving behind a trail of deception and a teaser for a sequel: The Heist Continues.

== Cast ==
- Saif Ali Khan as Rehan Roy
- Jaideep Ahlawat as Rajan Aulakh
- Nikita Dutta as Farah
- Kunal Kapoor as Vikram Patel
- Kulbhushan Kharbanda as Dr. Jayant Roy, Rehan's father
- Ujjawal Gauraha as Mr. Mehta
- Gagan Arora as Avi Roy, Rehan's brother
- Loitongbam Dorendra Singh as Anees Moosa
- Shaji Chaudhary as Salim Misti
- Sumit Gulati as Chunky
- Meenal Sahu as Nikki Taneja
- Ayaz Khan as Manish Ashar
- Vinay Sharma as Shekhar
- Chirjot Singh Kohli as Gaurav Chaddha
- Peter Muxka Manuel as Prince Gamunu

== Production ==
=== Development ===
The film was announced in February 2024, starring Saif Ali Khan and Jaideep Ahlawat.

However, on 28 May 2024, the official title of the film was announced Jewel Thief – The Red Sun Chapter.

=== Filming ===
Principal photography began in March 2024. The filming took place in Mumbai and Budapest before wrapping up in May 2024.

In November 2024, Kookie Gulati was brought in for reshoots. The reshoot was completed in December 2024.

== Soundtrack ==
Jewel Thief – The Heist Begins

Soundtrack album by Sachin–Jigar, OAFF–Savera and Soundtrek–Anis Ali Sabri
- Released: 23 April 2025
- Recorded: 2024–2025
- Genre: Feature film soundtrack
- Length: 10:47
- Language: Hindi
- Label: T-Series
External audio
- Jewel Thief – The Heist Begins - Full Album on YouTube

The music of the film is composed by Sachin–Jigar, OAFF–Savera and Soundtrek–Anis Ali Sabri while lyrics are written by Kumaar and Soundtrek–Anis Ali. The first single titled "Jaadu" was released on 9 April 2025. The second single titled "Ilzaam" was released on 17 April 2025.

Track listing
No.	Title	Lyrics	Music	Singer(s)	Length
1.	"Jaadu"	Kumaar	OAFF–Savera	Raghav Chaitanya	2:32
2.	"Lootera"	Kumaar	Sachin–Jigar	Neuman Pinto, Shilpa Rao, Sachin–Jigar	3:29
3.	"Ilzaam"	Kumaar	Soundtrek–Anis Ali Sabri	Vishal Mishra, Shilpa Rao	2:26
4.	"Jewel Thief - Title Track"	Soundtrek–Anis Ali Sabri	Soundtrek–Anis Ali Sabri	Shilpa Rao, Raghav Chaitanya	2:20
Total length:					10:47

== Marketing and release ==
The teaser was released on 3 February 2025 and the trailer was released on 14 April 2025.

In February 2025, Netflix revealed its slate lineup for 2025, and the film was re-titled as Jewel Thief: The Heist Begins.

The film was made available for streaming on Netflix on 25 April 2025. The series was trending in 52 countries. It exceeded Animal and gained a viewership of 16.1 million climbing to #3 among top 10 shows in Netflix ,also becoming highest grossing Indian show in Netflix.

== Reception ==
On the review aggregator website Rotten Tomatoes, 5% of 20 critics' reviews are positive, with an average rating of 3.8/10. Rishabh Suri writing for Hindustan Times gave the film 1 out of 5 stars. Shubhra Gupta from The Indian Express rated the film 1/5 stars. Sukanya Verma of Rediff awarded the film 2 1/2 out of 5 stars. A critic from The Hindu reviewed the film.
