= Satchith Paulose =

Indian cinematographer

- Born: Bengaluru, Karnataka, India
- Occupation: Cinematographer
- Notable work: The School Bag, Fighter, Pathaan
- Father: C. J. Paulose

Satchith Paulose is an Indian cinematographer who has worked in Hindi cinema and advertisements. He is known for his cinematography in Pathaan (2023) and Fighter (2024).

== Early life and education ==
Satchith Paulose was born and raised in Bengaluru, Karnataka, and hails from a family originally from Ernakulam, Kerala. He is the son of filmmaker C. J. Paulose, a former FTII student whose documentary won the Filmfare Award for Best Documentary. After completing a degree in Architecture, he studied Film and Video Communication at the National Institute of Design and later specialized in cinematography at the Film and Television Institute of India, Pune.

== Career ==
After graduating from FTII, Paulose worked in advertising and short films before moving to feature films. His cinematography on The School Bag received recognition at international film festivals. He later served as cinematographer for the feature films Pathaan (2023) and Fighter (2024).

== Filmography ==
Year	Title	Notes	Ref
2017	The School Bag	Short film	
2023	Pathaan		
2024	Fighter		
2026	King †		

== Awards and nominations ==
Year	Film	Award	Category	Result	Ref
2016	The School Bag	Free Spirit Film Festival	Best Cinematography - Jury	Won	
2024	Pathaan	Filmfare Awards 2024	Best Cinematography	Nominated	
