= Kaali Khuhi =

2020 Indian horror film

- Directed by: Terrie Samundra
- Written by: Terrie Samundra; David Walter Lech; Rupinder Inderjit
- Produced by: Ramon Chibb; Anku Pande
- Starring: Shabana Azmi; Sanjeeda Sheikh; Riva Arora; Satyadeep Mishra; Leela Samson
- Cinematography: Sejal Shah
- Edited by: Sanyukta Kaza
- Music by: Daniel B.George
- Production company: Manomay Motion Pictures
- Distributed by: Netflix
- Release date: 30 October 2020
- Country: India
- Language: Hindi

Kaali Khuhi is an Indian Hindi-language horror film directed by Terrie Samundra, produced by Anku Pande and Ramon Chibb,written by Samundra, David Walter Lech and Rupinder Inderjit, and starring Shabana Azmi, Sanjeeda Sheikh, Riva Arora and Satyadeep Mishra. The plot revolves around Shivangi, a 10 year old girl trying to save her family and village from ghosts.

== Cast ==
- Shabana Azmi as Satya Maasi
- Sanjeeda Sheikh as Priya
- Riva Arora as Shivangi
- Satyadeep Mishra as Darshan
- Leela Samson as Dadi
- Hetvi Bhanushali
- Rose Rathore
- Samuel John
- Pooja Sharma as Young Satya
- Jatinder Kaur
- Sukhwinder Virk
- Tejinder Kour
- Amita Sharma as Young Dadi
- Satnam Singh
- Chand Rani

== Release ==
The film was released on October 30, 2020. On the review aggregator website Rotten Tomatoes, 56% of 9 critics' reviews are positive, with an average rating of 4.5/10.
