= Ishq Jaisa Kuch =

2023 song by Vishal Dadlani, Shekhar Ravjiani, Shilpa Rao and Mellow D

- Song cover

Single by Vishal Dadlani, Shekhar Ravjiani, Shilpa Rao and Mellow D

from the album Fighter
- Language: Hindi
- Released: 22 December 2023
- Recorded: 2022–2023
- Studio: Future Sound of Bombay, Mumbai
- Genre: Dance; pop; Western classical; soft rock
- Length: 2:49
- Label: T-Series
- Composer: Vishal–Shekhar
- Lyricist: Kumaar
- Producer: Abhijit Nalani

Music video
- "Ishq Jaisa Kuch" on YouTube

"Ishq Jaisa Kuch" is an Indian Hindi-language song, composed by Vishal–Shekhar with lyrics written by Kumaar and sung by Vishal Dadlani, Shekhar Ravjiani, Shilpa Rao and Mellow D, for the soundtrack album of the 2024 Indian film Fighter. It was released on 22 December 2023 as the second single from the album, through T-Series.

Upon release, the song received positive reviews by audience and critics. The hook step in the film, performed by the lead actors Hrithik Roshan and Deepika Padukone became widely popular and a pop-culture phenomenon. The track also topped the national charts, in all music and video platforms.

"Ishq Jaisa Kuch" experienced large amounts of commercial success. The song debuted at number on the Billboard India Songs.

== Composition ==
Vishal–Shekhar composed the song which was sung by Vishal Dadlani, Shekhar Ravjiani, Shilpa Rao. Rap portion was done by Mellow D. Kumaar worked on the lyrics for the track.

== Music video ==
The music video featuring Hrithik Roshan and Deepika Padukone, was shot across Italy in September 2023. It was choreographed by the duo Bosco–Caesar. The song begins with Roshan walking bare-chested from the sea, while Padukone dons a black monokini. Later in the song, the leading duo is seen in beach and party-ready outfits, with Padukone wearing a gold and silver embellished mini skirt and bralette-style top by Paco Rabanne.

== Release ==
The teaser of the track was released on 20 December. The second single "Ishq Jaisa Kuch" was released on 22 December 2023.

== Critical reception ==
Pranita Chaubey of NDTV wrote "Hrithik Roshan's exceptional dance moves matched by an equally adept Deepika Padukone. Add scenic locations and Deepika and Hrithik's chemistry to the mix and that is the track Ishq Jaisa Kuch summed up for you." Bollywood Hungama said the song "is poised to be a game-changer with a perfect blend of catchy lyrics, captivating visuals, and foot-tapping beats". ABP News commented it "enthralls the hearts of viewers with its sizzling romantic track, the dynamic chemistry between the gorgeous duo - Hrithik and Deepika, picturesque landscapes, and a melody that resonates deeply. It's poised to charm the audience in every possible manner". Firstpost wrote "Vishal & Sheykhar, Shilpa Rao, and Mellow D lend their extraordinary voices to this melody, complemented by lyrics crafted by Kumaar. ‘Ishq Jaisa Kuch,’ composed by Vishal & Sheykhar and choreographed by dynamic duo Bosco and Caesar, promises to be an irresistible groovy yet romantic hit." Shreyanka Mazumdar of News18 wrote "In the song, Deepika makes sure she is the cynosure of all eyes in a black monokini, a sequinned crop top paired with a mini skirt, and a one-shoulder blue bodysuit. Hrithik Roshan also exudes heat in unbuttoned shirts. Their dance unfolds against the backdrop of a pristine ocean."

== Credits and personnel ==
- Vishal–Shekhar – composer, vocal
- Kumaar – lyricist
- Shilpa Rao – vocal
- Mellow D – rap
- Bosco–Caesar – Choreographer
- Eric Pillai – mix engineer
- Abhijit Nalani – music producer
- Rhythm Shaw – guitar

== Accolades ==
Year	Award	Category	Nominee/Work	Result	Ref.
2025	25th IIFA Awards	Best Female Playback Singer	Shilpa Rao for "Ishq Jaisa Kuch"	Nominated	

== Charts ==
Chart performances for "Ishq Jaisa Kuch"
Chart (2023)	Peak position
India (Billboard)|	16
United Kingdom (Official Video Streaming Chart)	79
