= Nagabandham: The Secret Treasure =

2026 Indian Telugu language film

- Film poster
- Directed by: Abhishek Nama
- Produced by: Kishore Annapureddy; Nishitha Nagireddy
- Starring: Virat Karrna; Nabha Natesh; Iswarya Menon; Jagapathi Babu
- Cinematography: Soundararajan
- Edited by: RC Pranav
- Music by: Junaid Kumar-Abhe
- Production companies: NIK Studios; Abhishek Pictures
- Distributed by: Zee Studios
- Release date: 3 July 2026
- Running time: 165 minutes
- Country: India
- Language: Telugu

Nagabandham: The Secret Treasure is a 2026 Indian Telugu-language action adventure-drama film directed by Abhishek Nama. The film is produced by Kishore Annapureddy and Nishitha Annapureddy under the banner NIK Studios. It stars Virat Karrna, Nabha Natesh and Iswarya Menon in the lead roles, with Rishabh Sawhney, Jagapathi Babu, Mahesh Manjrekar, V. Jayaprakash, Murali Sharma, Anasuya Bharadwaj and B. S. Avinash in supporting roles.

Conceived as a pan-Indian production, Nagabandham draws from the mythology surrounding ancient Vishnu temples in India and the sacred ritual of "Nagabandham" believed to protect divine treasures. The narrative is reported to have been inspired by real-life treasure discoveries at temples such as the Padmanabhaswamy Temple and the Jagannath Temple, Puri. It is also partly set against the backdrop of the 18th-century invasions of Ahmad Shah Abdali, with actor Rishabh Sawhney portraying the titular antagonist.

The film's music is composed by Junaid Kumar and Abhe, with cinematography by Soundar Rajan S. and editing by R. C. Pranav. It is scheduled to release theatrically worldwide on 3 July 2026 in Telugu, Hindi, Tamil, Kannada and Malayalam languages.

== Plot ==
Nagabandham is set against the backdrop of India's ancient Vishnu temples and explores the enigmatic ritual of "Nagabandham" — a mystical practice believed to seal and protect sacred treasures hidden within temple vaults. The story follows a warrior figure whose destiny becomes intertwined with the protection of this divine legacy as forces of greed threaten to breach its centuries-old guardianship.

== Cast ==
- Virat Karrna as Rudhra and Shiva
- Nabha Natesh as Parvathi and Revathi
- Iswarya Menon as Suvarna
- Rishabh Sawhney as Ali / Ahmad Shah Abdali
- Jagapathi Babu as Prabhakar
- Mahesh Manjrekar as Suvarna
- V. Jayaprakash as Venkateshwarulu
- Murali Sharma as Achyutha Chary
- Anasuya Bharadwaj as Leelavathi
- Daksha Nagarkar as Priyamani
- Ravi Mariya as Vasanth
- B. S. Avinash as Raja Veera
- L. B. Sriram as Pardhasaradhi
- Ramachandra Raju as Bhairagi
- Baby Kiara Khanna as Malli / Ria

== Music ==
The film's soundtrack is composed by Junaid Kumar and Abhe, with Junaid Kumar also providing the background score. Lyrics have been written by Kasarla Shyam, Kalyan Chakravarthy and Sriharsha Emani.

The first single, "Namo Re" — a devotional track paying homage to Lord Narayana — was released in March 2026. The second single, "Sura Sura", themed around a wedding celebration and featuring Iswarya Menon, was released on 19 April 2026.

Track listing
No.	Title	Lyrics	Singer(s)	Length
1.	"Namo Re"	Sri Harsha Emani	Sindhuja Srinivasan, Aishwarya Daruri	4:20
2.	"Sura Sura"	Kasarla Shyam	Kanakavva, Nalgonda Gaddar, Anurag Kulkarni, Kaala Bhairava, Mangli, Sahithi Chaganti	4:18
3.	"Veera Naga"	Sri Harsha Emani	Deepak Blue	4:40

== Home media ==
The satellite rights of the film were bagged by Amazon Prime Video. It started streaming on July 26, 2026. In dubbed versions of Tamil, Malayalam and Kannada.

== Reception ==
Srivathsan Nadadhur of The Hindu said that "For all the effort that has gone into Nagabandham's larger-than-life visual appeal, its core is disappointing. Like several recent films, it works as a clickbait film." Yashaswini Sri of The Indian Express said that "Money can buy scale, and this film proves it, but it cannot buy a reason to care. Audiences who want nothing more than a big, loud mythological spectacle on the biggest screen available will get their ticket's worth. Buried inside these three hours is a sharp two-hour adventure." Suresh Kavirayani of the Cinema Express said that "Nagabandham is a visually spectacular film. While the first half keeps the audience invested, the second half loses momentum. With a tighter screenplay and a stronger emotional core, Nagabandham could have been a far more engaging experience." Shreya Varanasi of The Times of India said that "Nagabandham has the ingredients for an engaging mythological fantasy, but an overstuffed screenplay prevent it from living up to its ambitious vision."
