= Jaideep Ahlawat =

Indian actor (born 1980)

- Jaideep Ahlawat in 2023
- Born: 8 February 1980 (age 46); Kharkara, Haryana, India
- Education: Jat College (BA); University of Rohtak (MA); FTII
- Occupation: Actor
- Years active: 2008–present
- Spouse: Jyoti Hooda (m. 2009)

Jaideep Ahlawat is an Indian actor (born, February 8, 1980) who works in Hindi films and web series. After graduating from the Film and Television Institute of India, he played minor roles in several films before appearing in the crime film Gangs of Wasseypur (2012), which marked a turning point in his career. This was followed by supporting roles in several films, including Commando: A One Man Army (2013), Gabbar Is Back (2015), Raees (2017), Raazi (2018) and Vishwaroopam II (2018). In 2020, he won acclaim for portraying a police officer in the streaming series Paatal Lok, which earned him a Filmfare OTT Award for Best Actor in a Drama Series.

He is the recipient of several awards including three Filmfare OTT Awards.

== Early life and education ==
Jaideep Ahlawat was born in Kharkara, a village in the Meham Chaubisi tehsil of the Rohtak district, Haryana, India, into a Hindu Jat family. He completed his secondary education from Government High School in Kharkara, before attending Jat College in Rohtak. Following his graduation, Ahlawat earned a Master of Arts (MA) degree in English from Maharshi Dayanand University in 2005. In 2008, he attended the Film and Television Institute of India (FTII) in Pune, Maharashtra, where Rajkummar Rao, Vijay Varma, and Sunny Hinduja were his batchmates.

Ahlawat is married to Jyoti Hooda, who was his junior at FTTI.

== Career ==
Ahlawat developed an interest in theatre from a young age but initially aspired to become an officer in the Indian Army. After unsuccessfully failing to clear his SSB interviews several times, he pursued acting and performed in stage productions across Punjab and Haryana. He began taking acting seriously after completing his graduation and moved to Mumbai in 2008 to pursue a career in the film industry.

Ahlawat made his debut in Priyadarshan's Khatta Meetha (2010), in which he played a negative role. He subsequently appeared in Priyadarshan's other directorial, Aakrosh, alongside Ajay Devgn the same year. He gained wider recognition in Gangs of Wasseypur (2012), which marked a turning point in his career, and Vishwaroopam (2012). He reprised his role in the sequel, Vishwaroopam II, in 2018.

Ahlawat continued to appear in films and forayed into web series, making his debut in the thriller, Bard of Blood, opposite Emraan Hashmi. His portrayal of a police officer in the web series, Paatal Lok, received widespread acclaim.

In 2023, Ahlawat received further acclaim for his performances in Jaane Jaan co-starring Kareena Kapoor and Vijay Varma, and Maharaj opposite Junaid Khan. He was next seen in the heist comedy Jewel Thief, opposite Saif Ali Khan, which received negative reviews, although his performance received praise.

Ahlawat's first role of 2026 was of a Pakistani Army Brigadier in the war drama, Ikkis, where he starred alongside Dharmendra in his final film role, and Agastya Nanda, grandson of Amitabh Bachchan. Though commercially unsuccessful, the film received positive reviews from critics. He is set to appear in King alongside Shah Rukh Khan.

== Filmography ==
Key
†	Denotes films that have not yet been released

=== Film ===
Year	Title	Role	Notes	Ref.
2010	Aakrosh	Pappu Tiwari		
2010	Khatta Meetha	Sanjay Rane		
2011	Chittagong	Anant Singh		
2011	Rockstar	Trilok		
2012	Gangs of Wasseypur	Shahid Khan		
2013	Vishwaroopam	Salim	Tamil film	
2013	Vishwaroop	Salim		
2013	Commando: A One Man Army	Amrit Kanwal "AK 47"		
2013	Aatma - Feel it around you	Inspector Raza		
2015	Gabbar is Back	CBI officer Kuldeep Pahwa		
2015	Meeruthiya Gangsters	Nikhil		
2017	Raees	Nawab		
2018	Raazi	Khalid Mir		
2018	Lust Stories	Sudhir		
2018	Vishwaroopam II	Salim	Tamil film	
2018	Vishwaroop II	Salim		
2018	Bhaiaji Superhit	Helicopter Mishra		
2020	Baaghi 3	Inder Paheli Lamba "IPL"		
2020	Khaali Peeli	Yusuf		
2021	Ajeeb Daastaans	Babloo		
2021	Sandeep Aur Pinky Faraar	Tyagi		
2021	Tryst With Destiny	Kuber		
2022	An Action Hero	Bhoora Solanki		
2022	Three of Us	Pradip Kamat		
2023	Jaane Jaan	Naren Vyas		
2024	Maharaj	Maharaj Jadunath		
2025	Jewel Thief	Rajan Aulakh		
2026	Ikkis	Brigadier Jaan Mohammad Nisar		
2026	Drishyam: The Conclusion	SP Rajveer Singh Tomar		
2026	Prahaar: The Untold Story of Ujjwal Nikam	Chaudhary Zulfiqar Ali		
2026	King †	TBA		
2027	Amri †	Umrao Singh Sher-Gil		

=== Television ===
Year	Title	Role	Notes	Ref
2012	Upnishad Ganga	Multiple		
2019	Bard of Blood	Shehzad Tanveer		
2020–present	Paatal Lok	Hathi Ram Chaudhary		
2022	Bloody Brothers	Jaggi Grover		
2022–2024	The Broken News	Deepankar Sanyal		
2025	The Family Man	Rukmangadha Sinha "Rukma"		
2026	Kohrra Season 2	The Railway Lineman	Cameo appearance	

== Awards and nominations ==
Year	Award	Category	Work	Result	Ref(s)
2013	19th Screen Awards	Best Ensemble Cast	Gangs of Wasseypur	Nominated	
2014	Zee Cine Awards	Best Performance in a Negative Role	Commando	Nominated	
2014	20th Screen Awards	Best Actor in a Negative Role – Male	Commando	Nominated	
2019	Zee Cine Awards	Best Actor in a Supporting Role – Male	Raazi	Nominated	
2019	26th Screen Awards	Best Supporting Actor	Raazi	Nominated	
2020	2020 Filmfare OTT Awards	Best Actor in a Drama Series	Paatal Lok Season 1	Won	
2023	68th Filmfare Awards	Best Supporting Actor	An Action Hero	Nominated	
2023	24th IIFA Awards	Best Supporting Actor	An Action Hero	Nominated	
2024	69th Filmfare Awards	Best Actor (Critics)	Three of Us	Nominated	
2025	2024 Filmfare OTT Awards	Best Actor in a Web Original Film	Jaane Jaan	Nominated	
2025	2024 Filmfare OTT Awards	Best Actor (Critics) in a Web Original Film	Jaane Jaan	Won	
2025	2024 Filmfare OTT Awards	Best Supporting Actor in a Web Original Film	Maharaj	Won	
2025	25th IIFA Awards	Best Actor in a Series	The Broken News Season 2	Nominated	
2025	25th IIFA Awards	Best Supporting Actor in a Web Film	Maharaj	Nominated	
