= Ramon Chibb =

Indian filmmaker (born 1968)

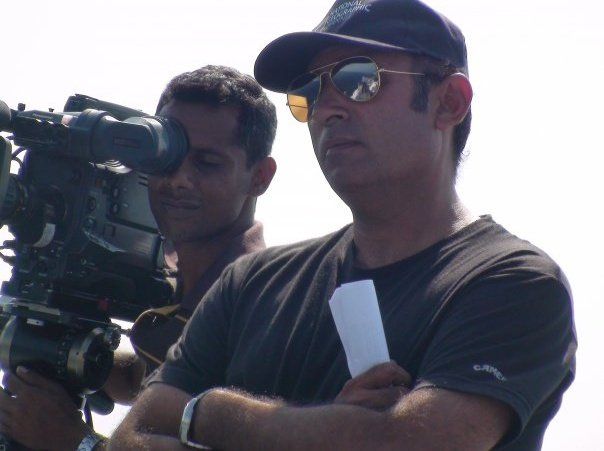
- Ramon Chibb
- Born: Ramon Chibb; 11 January 1968 (age 58); Kanpur, Uttar Pradesh, India
- Occupation: Filmmaker
- Years active: 1996–present
- Military career
- Allegiance: India
- Branch: Indian Army
- Service years: 1990–1995
- Rank: Major
- Unit: 18th Battalion Kumaon Regiment

Ramon Chibb is an Indian filmmaker and former Indian Army officer known for his work in Hindi films and documentaries. He is the co-founder of Manomay Motion Pictures Pvt. Ltd.

== Personal life ==
Chibb was born in Kanpur, Uttar Pradesh, India to Group Captain M.L. Chibb an Indian Air Force officer and Vimala Chibb. Because of his father's transferrable job, Ramon grew up in various cities across the country viz Jorhat, Wellington, Agra, Patiala, Calcutta, Baroda, Delhi, Secunderabad and Ahmedabad. He completed his high school education from The Air Force School, Delhi and graduated with a Bachelor of Economics from St. Xavier's College Ahmedabad.

== Career ==
Chibb joined the Indian Army in 1990. He was commissioned into the 18th Battalion of The Kumaon Regiment, one of the oldest and most decorated infantry regiment of the Indian Army. He served in the Indian Army till 1995. After hanging his uniform, he learned filmmaking from his sister Rima Chibb, a documentary filmmaker.

Chibb began directing and producing documentaries, advertisements and TV independently in 1996. In 2003, he executive produced the first local production of the National Geographic Channel in India, titled Mission Everest. He has also directed reality shows and documentaries for Zee, Star, National Geographic and UTV.

In 2005, Chibb was one of the founding members of the Zee group when it forayed into the digital space. He was appointed Vice President, Head of Content for Zee's digital arm, DMCL.

In 2007, he became Vice President, Head of Content and Operations for UTV Bindass, a youth TV Channel launched by UTV.

In the year 2010 he was appointed Senior Vice President, Head of Content for National Geographic and FOX in India.

Chibb is best known for producing documentaries and TV shows revolving around the Indian Military. He has produced and directed the first four ''Mission series'' for the National Geographic. Besides ''Mission Everest'', he has produced and directed the series ''Mission Udaan''- Inside Indian Air Force, Mission Navy, and Mission Army.

Since 2013, he is producing films and content under his own company, Manomay Motion Pictures.

In 2020, Chibb Produced a Netflix Original film, Kaali Khuhi. The film has Shabana Azmi and Sanjeeda Sheikh in lead roles.

In 2022, he was the Creative Consultant for the film Laal Singh Chaddha.

Chibb is one of the Producers of the 2024 Aerial Action feature film Fighter. He has written the Screenplay of Fighter and is the Second Unit Director of the film. Chibb has co-written the story of the film along with director Siddharth Anand. He has also acted in the film and played the role of Air Commodore Abhinder Bali, Chief Instructor (Flying), Air Force Academy. Fighter released on 25th Jan 2024

== Filmography ==
Year	Film	Producer	Director	Writer	Notes
2010	Cutting Carbon Footprint	Yes	Yes	No	National Geographic Film
2020	Kaali Khuhi	Yes	No	No	Netflix Original film
2022	Laal Singh Chaddha	No	No	No	Creative Consultant
2024	Fighter	Yes	2nd Unit	Yes	Co-wrote story with Siddharth Anand; Portrayed Air Commodore Abhinder Bali (Abhi)

== Television credits ==
Year	Title	Role	Channel
2011	Xtreme Trail	Writer, Producer	National Geographic
2011	Life Mein Ek Baar	Writer, Head of Content	Fox Traveller
2011	Inside Kingdom of Dreams	Producer	National Geographic
2011	Twist of Taste with Vineet Bhatia	Writer, Head of Content	Fox Traveller
2011	Whats With Indian Men	Head of Content	Fox Traveller
2011	Mission Army	Director, Writer and Producer	National Geographic
2011	India Investigates	Head of Content	Fox Traveller
2011	Trapped in Ladhak	Head of Content	National Geographic
2010	It Happens Only in India	Head of Content	Fox Traveller
2009	Sun Yaar Chill Maar	Head of Content	UTV Bindass
2009	A R Rahman Unplugged	Director, Producer	Doordarshan
2009	Mission Navy	Director, Writer and Producer	National Geographic
2007	Lagegi	Head of Content	UTV Bindass
2007	Shakira - The End Of Evil	Head of Content	UTV Bindass
2006	Hassley India	Head of Content	UTV Bindass
2005	Mission Udaan	Director, Writer and Producer	National Geographic
2005	Biography with Diana Hayden	Executive Producer	The History Channel
2005	Lakme Fashion House	Creative Director	STAR TV
2004	Hollywood Heroes with Ashok Amritraj	Director, Producer	The History Channel
2004	India's Best Cinestars Ki Khoj	Director, Reality	ZEE
2003	Mission Everest	Executive Producer	National Geographic
2003	Full Toss	Director, Pilot	Hungama
1998	Garhwal A home in the Mountains	Director, Producer	Film Festivals
1996	The Green Show	Editor	Doordarshan
1995	Heads and Tails	Editor	Doordarshan
1995	Terraview	Editor	Doordarshan
