= The School Bag =

- Poster
- Directed by: Dheeraj Jindal & Anshul Agrawal
- Written by: Anshul Agrawal
- Produced by: Dheeraj Jindal; Shashi Chopra
- Starring: Rasika Duggal; Sartaaj RK
- Cinematography: Satchith Paulose
- Edited by: Neil Sehgal
- Music by: Yousuf Hussain
- Distributed by: Large Short Films
- Release date: 2017
- Running time: 16 minutes
- Country: India
- Language: Hindi

The School Bag is a 2017 short film directed by Dheeraj Jindal and Anshul Agrawal, written by Anshul Agrawal, starring Rasika Duggal and Sartaj RK. The film has been screened at more than 100 film festival across 24 countries and won 44 awards in different categories. The film was applauded by critics as well public after its online release on Large Short Films.

The short film is based on a real life 2014 Peshawar school massacre in Pakistan when 132 children were killed in Army Public School, Peshawar by terrorists.

== Cast ==
- Rasika Duggal
- Sartaj RK

== Plot Summary ==
A young Farooq asks his mother for a new school bag as his 7th birthday gift. The mother tries to placate his son's demand but the son is obstinate. Farooq quarrels with her mother and refuses to attend the school next day unless his mother gets the bag today evening itself. Next morning, he is surprised to see the new bag lying in the house. His mother must have already bought the bag before. The mother wishes him, gives him her blessings and Farooq happily leaves for the school. While cooking sevai (sweet vermicelli dish) for his birthday feast, she learns about the shootout in the school on her radio. By this time, there was already a knock on her door with a policeman carrying the new bag laden with soot.

== Reception ==
The film has been selected and won many international awards

- Vancouver Film Festival
- Fastnet Film Festival Winner
- Reel to real International film festival
- Best Short Film at Sandpoint Film Festival in USA
- Smita Patil International Film Festival
- GIIFFA
- Haryana International Short Film Festival
- Bengal International Short Film Festival
- Lahore International Children's Film Festival
- Indian Film Festival of Cincinnati
- Free Spirit Film Festival
