= King (2026 film) =

Upcoming Indian film by Siddharth Anand

- Theatrical release poster
- Directed by: Siddharth Anand
- Screenplay by: Siddharth Anand; Sujoy Ghosh; Suresh Nair; Sagar Pandya
- Dialogues by: Abbas Tyrewala
- Story by: Sujoy Ghosh
- Produced by: Gauri Khan; Mamta Anand
- Starring: Shah Rukh Khan; Suhana Khan; Abhishek Bachchan; Deepika Padukone; Anil Kapoor; Rani Mukerji; Jaideep Ahlawat; Jackie Shroff; Arshad Warsi; Raghav Juyal; Abhay Verma
- Cinematography: Satchith Paulose
- Edited by: Aarif Sheikh; Ruben
- Music by: Sachin–Jigar
- Production companies: Red Chillies Entertainment; Marflix Pictures
- Distributed by: Pen Marudhar (India); Phars Film (Overseas)
- Release date: 24 December 2026
- Country: India
- Language: Hindi
- Budget: ₹550 crore (Note: The figure includes production costs, marketing expenses and Shah Rukh Khan’s notional acting fee. Earlier reports of a ₹450 crore budget were dismissed by Siddharth Anand in July 2026.)

King is an upcoming Indian Hindi-language action thriller film directed by Siddharth Anand, who co-wrote the screenplay with Sujoy Ghosh, Suresh Nair, and Sagar Pandya. Produced by Gauri Khan and Mamta Anand under Red Chillies Entertainment and Marflix Pictures, the film stars Shah Rukh Khan, Suhana Khan (in her theatrical debut), Abhishek Bachchan, Deepika Padukone, Anil Kapoor, Rani Mukerji, Jaideep Ahlawat, Jackie Shroff, Arshad Warsi, Raghav Juyal and Abhay Verma.

Principal photography began in May 2025, and took place in Mumbai, Delhi, Cape Town, Warsaw, and Gdańsk. The film's soundtrack and film score is composed by Sachin–Jigar.

King is scheduled to release theatrically on 24 December 2026, coinciding with Christmas Eve. Unlike the multi-language releases of Shah Rukh Khan’s previous action films, the project is being positioned primarily for the Hindi market, following a similar approach to director Siddharth Anand’s previous film Fighter.

== Cast ==
- Shah Rukh Khan
- Suhana Khan
- Abhishek Bachchan
- Deepika Padukone
- Anil Kapoor
- Rani Mukerji
- Jaideep Ahlawat
- Raghav Juyal
- Abhay Verma
- Jackie Shroff
- Arshad Warsi
- Saurabh Shukla
- Akshay Oberoi
- Karanvir Malhotra
- Chandan K. Anand
- Kashvi Majmundar
- Kareena Kapoor (special appearance)

== Production ==
=== Development ===
Following the commercial success of Pathaan (2023), reports emerged that Shah Rukh Khan would collaborate with director Sujoy Ghosh on an action thriller film. The project, produced by Siddharth Anand and Gauri Khan, was reported to feature Suhana Khan in her feature film debut. Initially titled King, the film was scheduled to begin production in November 2023. The title had previously been acquired by Sajid Nadiadwala for a planned project starring Hrithik Roshan and directed by Kabir Khan, which was later shelved; Nadiadwala subsequently transferred the title rights to Red Chillies Entertainment.

Filming was originally planned to take place between November 2024 and March 2025, allowing Khan to prioritize other commitments, including Tiger vs Pathaan; however, these plans were delayed. The schedule was later revised to January 2025, before being postponed again. In December 2024, Anand replaced Ghosh as director for undisclosed reasons, with Ghosh remaining as a co-writer. The film is reportedly inspired by the 1994 French film Léon: The Professional.

=== Casting ===
Khan and his daughter Suhana were officially confirmed as part of the film in February 2024, marking Suhana's theatrical debut following her appearance in The Archies (2023). While early reports suggested that Khan would appear in an extended cameo, it was later clarified that he plays a full-fledged lead role. He was reportedly cast as a sleek, highly skilled assassin, with Suhana portraying his protégé—an apprentice navigating the dangerous world under his guidance. In July 2024, Abhishek Bachchan joined the project as the primary antagonist, and Abhay Verma was cast in a pivotal role the following month.

Deepika Padukone was confirmed to be part of the cast in April 2025 after initially declining due to personal commitments: the role had been offered to Kareena Kapoor, Sonam Bajwa, Katrina Kaif, and Preity Zinta, before Padukone ultimately agreed following schedule adjustments at Khan's request. In the same month, Arshad Warsi joined the cast. In May 2025, Anil Kapoor, Jackie Shroff, and Rani Mukerji joined the cast. In June 2025, Jaideep Ahlawat, Raghav Juyal, and Saurabh Shukla confirmed their involvement, followed by Akshay Oberoi and Karanvir Malhotra in September 2025. In October 2026, it was reported that Kareena Kapoor had joined the film for a special appearance in a song.

=== Filming ===
Principal photography was initially scheduled to begin in early 2025, but was delayed after Anand reworked the script. Filming commenced in May 2025 at Mehboob Studios in Mumbai. In June 2025, an action sequence set in a jail environment was shot at the same location with approximately 200 stunt performers, for which large-scale prison sets were constructed. During production, Juyal sustained a leg injury while performing stunt sequences. In July 2025, Khan also suffered a muscular injury while filming action scenes at the Golden Tobacco Factory in Vile Parle, Mumbai, and subsequently travelled to the United States for medical treatment, resulting in a brief delay in the schedule. The second schedule began in September 2025 in Warsaw, Poland. Warsi confirmed his participation by sharing a photograph from Warsaw's Old Town on social media, to which Anand responded with the comment “Welcome to the Kingdom”. Filming resumed in December 2025 after a six-week break for Khan's recovery. A large-scale action sequence featuring Khan and Bachchan, reportedly mounted on a budget of ₹50 crore, was subsequently filmed in Gdańsk, Poland.

In March 2026, an eight-night long Vijayadashami action sequence involving Khan and Suhana was filmed at Ellora Studios, Mumbai. In April 2026, a desert sequence featuring Kapoor and Suhana was scheduled to be filmed in Dubai; however, it was cancelled due to the ongoing crisis in the Middle East. The sequence was subsequently shifted to Mumbai for filming. In May 2026, filming relocated to Cape Town, South Africa, where a song featuring Shah Rukh Khan and Padukone was filmed. In August 2026, the film entered into its final phase of shooting, with an additional overseas schedule in either the United States or South America in consideration. In October 2026, the final filming schedule commenced in Goregaon. Khan filmed an action sequence at a studio in Andheri East, with the remaining action sequences scheduled to be completed in the same month. A dance sequence featuring Suhana, choreographed by Piyush Bhagat and Shazia Samji, was filmed at Film City, Mumbai. Later that month, a large-scale song sequence featuring the wider cast of film was shot in Mumbai. Khan had also filmed a dance sequence with Kapoor in Mumbai, choreographed by Vaibhavi Merchant. In November 2026, Khan began filming for an action sequence at the Buddh International Circuit.

== Music ==
The soundtrack and film score is composed by Sachin–Jigar, replacing Siddharth Anand's norm collaborators Vishal–Shekhar. Anirudh Ravichander was initially signed to compose the score and soundtrack, but reportedly exited the project in October 2026 due to scheduling conflicts. Anirudh had composed the film's title track prior to his departure, which Sachin–Jigar reworked for the background score.

T-Series serves as the music label for the film after acquiring its global music rights for an exclusive period of fifty years. The agreement was facilitated by Red Chillies Entertainment through Zee Music Company, and reportedly covers film's audio, music videos, and associated publishing interests.

In June 2025, it was reported that British singer-songwriter Ed Sheeran had contributed to a track for the film. The speculation began from Khan's appearance in the music video "Sapphire" by Sheeran and his related social media activity. In April 2026, Anirudh confirmed plans of a possible collaboration with Sheeran. The title theme "They Call Him King" was released on 2 November 2025, in conjunction with the first promotional glimpse of the film and Khan's 60th birthday.

The first single, "Tu Mil Jaaye", was released on 2 November 2026, coinciding with Khan's 61st birthday. The song also became the most viewed Indian song in 24 hours across all social media platforms.

Track listing
No.	Title	Lyrics	Music	Vocals	Length
1.	"They Call Him King (King Theme)"	Heisenberg	Anirudh Ravichander	Anirudh Ravichander	1:15
2.	"Tu Mil Jaaye"	Kumaar, Ed Sheeran	Sachin–Jigar	Arijit Singh, Ed Sheeran, Madhubanti Bagchi	5:15

== Marketing ==
The title reveal and first-look poster of the film were unveiled on 2 November 2025, coinciding with Khan's 60th birthday. The poster showcased Khan in a distinctive salt-and-pepper look. Prior to the official announcement, Anand teased the film's release date on X through a series of cryptic tweets.

== Release ==
=== Theatrical ===
King is scheduled for theatrical release in IMAX and 4DX formats on 24 December 2026, coinciding with Christmas Eve.

=== Distribution ===
The film will be distributed in India by Pen Marudhar. The overseas distribution rights were initially acquired by Yash Raj Films, before Phars Film later took over for ₹175 crore.
