= War (2019 film) =

2019 Indian film by Siddharth Anand

- Theatrical release poster
- Directed by: Siddharth Anand
- Screenplay by: Shridhar Raghavan; Siddharth Anand
- Dialogues by: Abbas Tyrewala
- Story by: Aditya Chopra; Siddharth Anand
- Produced by: Aditya Chopra
- Starring: Hrithik Roshan; Tiger Shroff; Vaani Kapoor; Ashutosh Rana
- Cinematography: Benjamin Jasper
- Edited by: Aarif Sheikh
- Music by: Songs: Vishal–Shekhar; Score: Sanchit Balhara and Ankit Balhara
- Production company: Yash Raj Films
- Distributed by: Yash Raj Films
- Release date: 2 October 2019
- Running time: 156 minutes
- Country: India
- Language: Hindi
- Budget: ₹170 crore
- Box office: ₹475.62 crore

War is a 2019 Indian Hindi-language action thriller film directed by Siddharth Anand and produced by Aditya Chopra under Yash Raj Films. It is the third installment in the YRF Spy Universe and set after the events of Ek Tha Tiger (2012) and Tiger Zinda Hai (2017), starring Hrithik Roshan and Tiger Shroff in the lead roles, with Vaani Kapoor and Ashutosh Rana in pivotal roles. In the film, an Indian RAW agent is assigned to eliminate his former mentor who has gone rogue.

Principal photography commenced in September 2018. Tentatively titled Fighters, the title of War was announced on 15 July 2019. The film was made on an estimated budget of ₹150 crore (US$16 million) with a further ₹20 crore (US$2.1 million) spent on print and advertising. Vishal–Shekhar composed the soundtrack, with the background score composed by Sanchit Balhara and Ankit Balhara, replacing Anand's frequent collaborators Salim–Sulaiman.

War was theatrically released on 2 October 2019, with dubbed versions of Telugu and Tamil, coinciding with Gandhi Jayanti. It received generally positive reviews from critics, with praise towards its action sequences, visuals, direction, cinematography, story, soundtrack, and cast performances, but criticism towards its screenplay. It emerged as a commercial success grossing ₹4.75 billion (US$67.45 million), becoming the highest-grossing Indian film of 2019. A sequel titled War 2 was released in 2025.

== Plot ==
In New Delhi, Major Kabir Dhaliwal is assigned to assassinate Iraqi terrorist Farid Haqqani, but instead kills veteran RAW agent V. K. Naidu and declares himself rogue. Defence Minister Sherna Patel and Colonel Sunil Luthra assign Kabir's former student Captain Khalid Rahmani to eliminate him.

Past: Khalid seeks to join Kabir's squad but is rejected because his father, Major Abdul Rahmani, betrayed the army, leaving Kabir wounded and his partner dead. Persuaded by Luthra, Kabir reluctantly accepts Khalid, alongside agents Saurabh, Prateek, Muthu and Aditi. During a mission in Tikrit, Iraq, the team kills Haqqani's associates and captures terrorist Basheer Hassib, forcing terrorist-turned-businessman Rizwan Ilyasi out of hiding. Kabir notices Khalid repeatedly missing targets on his right and discovers that he has limited peripheral vision due to a childhood injury caused by bullying over his father's betrayal. Impressed by Khalid's devotion to his mother and country, Kabir reinstates him. The team captures Ilyasi in Marrakesh, where he reveals that there is a mole among them. Saurabh exposes himself, killing Prateek and Muthu. During the ensuing shootout, Kabir is shot in the neck. He later learns from an injured Khalid that Saurabh was killed.

Present: Khalid pursues Kabir, who kills Lt. Col. Jimmy Shroff and reveals that his next target is Dr. Uptal Biswas in Lisbon. Khalid fails to stop Biswas's assassination and is suspended. Investigating Kabir's activities, Khalid makes a shocking discovery

Past: Six months earlier Kabir had been pursuing Ilyasi's associates to recover a government hard drive containing secret codes. Kabir had also used dancer Naina Sahni as a spy against Firoze Contractor, Ilyasi's manager, promising to provide for her daughter Ruhi. Firoze killed Naina, shortly after Kabir discovered that he was actually Ilyasi in disguise following plastic surgery. Kabir had since faked his betrayal to expose Ilyasi's agents, with only Aditi knowing the truth; this explains his killings of Naidu, Shroff and Biswas.

Present: Kabir and Khalid join forces, fleeing an attack on Kabir's hideout and travelling to Kerala, where they attend Aditi's wedding and recover the hard drive. Aditi explains that its codes target the Brahma satellite, which facilitates communication between the Indian government, agencies and troops on the Kashmir border. Ilyasi intends to destroy it, severing communications and enabling terrorists to cross the border undetected. Kabir gives the drive to Khalid. On a houseboat, Khalid poisons Kabir with TTX and reveals that he is actually Saurabh.

Past: Ilyasi shot the real Khalid, while Saurabh killed Ilyasi. Ilyasi had then taken Saurabh to plastic surgeon Dr. Mallika Singhal, who altered his face and vocal cords to make him appear as the injured Khalid.

Present: Saurabh throws the weakened Kabir into a river, then returns to Ilyasi aboard an icebreaker in the Arctic Circle. Kabir, saved by an antidote supplied by Aditi, parachutes onto the ship. Kabir reveals that he recognized Saurabh because he was able to shoot accurately from his right side during the attack on Kabir's hideout; he also drank alcohol, unlike Khalid. Aditi had also placed a GPS tracker in the hard drive. The missile's coordinates are revealed to have been redirected towards the ship. Saurabh kills Ilyasi and escapes before the missile destroys the vessel, pursued by Kabir to a derelict church. Kabir kills Saurabh by crushing him beneath the collapsing dome, saying he does not want a traitor to die with Khalid's face.

Khalid is posthumously honoured, with his mother Nafeesa receiving an award from the Prime Minister. Kabir later tells Luthra that he is better off working outside the system, as everyone has a price. In Bondi Beach, Sydney, Kabir surfs with Ruhi, fulfilling Naina's wish, before Luthra calls him to complete the unfinished mission of killing Haqqani.

== Cast ==
- Hrithik Roshan as Major Kabir Dhaliwal, a RAW agent
- Tiger Shroff in a dual role as
  - Captain Khalid Rahmani, Kabir's protege
    - Ayaan Zubair as young Khalid
  - Captain Saurabh Patil (after plastic surgery)
- Vaani Kapoor as Naina Sahni, Ruhi's mother
- Ashutosh Rana as Colonel Sunil Luthra, Joint Secretary of RAW
- Anupriya Goenka as Captain Aditi Nahta, Kabir's teammate
- Yash Raaj Singh as Captain Saurabh Patil (before plastic surgery)
- Sanjeev Vatsa as Rizwan Ilyasi (before plastic surgery)
- Mashhoor Amrohi as Firoze Contractor / Rizwan Ilyasi (after plastic surgery)
- Soni Razdan as Nafisa Rahmani, Khalid's mother
- Dipannita Sharma as Dr. Mallika Singhal, a plastic surgeon
- Arif Zakaria as Dr. Utpal Biswas
- Mohit Chauhan as V. K. Naidu, a retired RAW agent
- Amit Gaur as Lieutenant Colonel Jimmy Shroff Para SF
- Dishita Sehgal as Ruhi, Naina's daughter
- Jessey Lever as Muthu, Kabir's teammate
- Imran Ahamed as Saini
- Swaroopa Ghosh as Defence Minister Sherna Patel
- Anil Khopkar as Prime Minister of India
- Ravi Awana as Basheer Hassib
- Keith Dallison as Farid Haqqani

== Production ==
=== Development ===
On Yash Chopra's birth anniversary and following the success of Ek Tha Tiger (2012), Yash Raj Films announced a new action film starring Hrithik Roshan and Tiger Shroff. Vaani Kapoor was finalised to play the female lead. Action Choreographers, Paul Jennings and Se-Oh Yeong were employed to design the action sequences.

The climax scene of the film was shot on the Arctic Circle; the first Indian film to do so. Siddharth Anand, the director of the film stated, "We want to push the benchmark of action movies that are made in our country. So, we are bringing two of the biggest action choreographers together to design some of the most outlandish and visually-spectacular sequences. On one hand, we have Andy R Armstrong from Hollywood and on the other, we have Mr SeaYoung Oh, who is an outstanding martial arts action choreographer from South Korea."

=== Filming ===
Principal photography began in the second week of September 2018. The film also had a dance off between the two stars in the song "Jai Jai Shivshankar". The film schedule was wrapped up in the beginning of March 2019. The film was shot in multiple exotic locations across Delhi, Uttarakhand, Kerala, Portugal, Italy (Amalfi, Capri, Positano, Matera), Finland, Sweden, Georgia and Australia. The bike chase sequence between the two stars was filmed in Portugal. The car chase sequence which was the climax of the film was shot at the Arctic Circle.

== Music ==
The music of the film is composed by Vishal–Shekhar, while lyrics are written by Kumaar in his first formal collaboration with Yash Raj Films. All themes are composed by Sanchit Balhara and Ankit Balhara, who replaced director Siddharth Anand's frequent collaborators Salim-Sulaiman.

== Release ==
The film was released on 2 October 2019, coinciding with Gandhi Jayanti.

== Reception ==
=== Box office ===
War opened with collection of ₹53.35 crore on its first day. It was the highest opening day collection for a Hindi film. On its second day, it collected ₹24.35 crore. On the third day, it collected ₹22.45 crore, taking its total collection to ₹100.15 crore. War created six new records as the film reached to ₹100 crore mark at the box-office. The film entered the 100 Crore Club in three days of its release. The extended opening weekend collection of the film at ₹166.25 crore is the highest opening weekend collection for any 2019 Bollywood film. The film by crossing ₹200 crore in its opening week has become the fastest Bollywood film of 2019 to achieve the feat.

With a domestic gross of ₹318.01 crore and ₹157.61 crore from overseas, the film grossed ₹475.62 crore worldwide. It was the highest-grossing Indian film of 2019.

=== Critical response ===
War received generally positive reviews from critics; on the review aggregator website Rotten Tomatoes, the film holds a rating of 71% based on 17 reviews, with an average rating of 5.2/10.

Among positive reviews, Anupama Chopra said "War is a popcorn entertainer and you can't ask too many questions but if you're willing to suspend disbelief, the twists and turns exert a solid grip." A writer for Bollywood Hungama gave the film four stars out of five, and said "War is an action entertainer which has style as well as enough twists and turns to keep the viewers engrossed. At the box office, the extended weekend, dazzling action, stunning international locales and stylish execution will ensure mammoth footfalls for the film". Taran Adarsh gave it four stars out of five and called the film "[e]scapist cinema at its best". Komal Nahta of Film Information opined, "The film could prove to be the starting of a new franchise for the Yash Raj Films banner". Writing for India TV, Sonal gave the film three and a half stars out of five, writing, "Hrithik Roshan, Tiger Shroff of Abbas Mustan kinda twists, turns, characters, situations, logic, gravity, physics, chemistry, and some Ekta Kapoor-esque tricks all tossed together to make a visually spectacular concoction". Rajeev Masand of News18 gave the film two and a half out of five stars and said, "Both Hrithik Roshan and Tiger Shroff fully commit to the action, bringing swag to the big stylish sequences and a visceral energy to the one-on-one punch-ups in the movie."

The Times of India rated it three stars out of five and felt the film had "lot of style, stunts and show, but lacking a solid storyline". India Today rated it two and a half stars out of five and wrote, "War is a crowd-puller, but it isn't meant to further the cause of cinema". Daily News and Analysis gave three stars out of five and wrote, "War seems more like a Hrithik Roshan and YRF come back than anything else". Writing for The Indian Express, Shubhra Gupta granted the film two stars out of five, stating, "The chief trouble with War is that all the space is divvied up between Hrithik Roshan and Tiger Shroff, that the poor baddies don't really get a chance". Writing for Firstpost, Anna M. M. Vetticad gave two stars out of five, opining that the film "could have been a suspenseful, eyecatching, entertaining ride. But for its politics... [it] is a painfully condescending ode to Muslim loyalty to our vatan, an ode that is particularly cynical and offensive". Saibal Chatterjee of NDTV gave the film one and a half stars out of five and stated, "Powered by two loose-limbed and resolutely stone-faced male leads, Hrithik and Tiger, War is all style and no substance".

=== Accolades ===
Award (Note: Awards, festivals and organisations are in Alphabetical order.)	Date of ceremony (Note: Date is linked to the article about the awards held that year, wherever possible.)	Category	Recipient(s)	Result	Ref.
Filmfare Awards	15 February 2020	Best Film	Aditya Chopra	Nominated	
Filmfare Awards	15 February 2020	Best Director	Siddharth Anand	Nominated	
Filmfare Awards	15 February 2020	Best Female Playback Singer	Shilpa Rao ("Ghungroo")	Won	
Filmfare Awards	15 February 2020	Best Choreography	Bosco–Caesar ("Jai Jai Shiv Shankar")	Nominated	
Filmfare Awards	15 February 2020	Best Choreography	Bosco–Caesar & Tushar Kalia ("Ghungroo")	Nominated	
Filmfare Awards	15 February 2020	Best Action	Paul Jennings, Oh Sea Young, Parvez Shaikh & Franz Spilhaus	Won	
Filmfare Awards	15 February 2020	Best Special Effects	Sherry Bharda, Vishal Anand for YFX	Won	
International Indian Film Academy Awards	27–29 November 2020	Best Music Director	Vishal–Shekhar	Nominated	
International Indian Film Academy Awards	27–29 November 2020	Best Male Playback Singer	Arijit Singh ("Ghungroo")	Nominated	
International Indian Film Academy Awards	27–29 November 2020	Best Female Playback Singer	Shilpa Rao ("Ghungroo")	Nominated	
International Indian Film Academy Awards	27–29 November 2020	Sound Mixing	Anuj Mathur – YRF Studios; Pritam Das	Won	
International Indian Film Academy Awards	27–29 November 2020	Best Choreography	Bosco–Caesar & Tushar Kalia ("Ghungroo")	Won	
International Indian Film Academy Awards	27–29 November 2020	Best Special Effects	YFX (YRF Studios)	Won	
Mirchi Music Awards	19 February 2020	Song of The Year	"Ghungroo"	Nominated	
Mirchi Music Awards	19 February 2020	Female Vocalist of The Year	Shilpa Rao ("Ghungroo")	Nominated	
Mirchi Music Awards	19 February 2020	Song Engineer – Recording & Mixing	Abhay Rumde & Vijay Dayal ("Ghungroo")	Nominated	
Screen Awards	8 December 2019	Best Film	War	Nominated	
Screen Awards	8 December 2019	Best Director	Siddharth Anand	Nominated	
Screen Awards	8 December 2019	Best Actor	Hrithik Roshan	Nominated	
Screen Awards	8 December 2019	Best Supporting Actress	Vaani Kapoor	Nominated	
Screen Awards	8 December 2019	Best Choreography	Bosco–Caesar & Tushar Kalia ("Ghungroo")	Won	
Screen Awards	8 December 2019	Best Action	Paul Jennings, Oh Sea Young, Parvez Shaikh & Franz Spilhaus	Won	
Screen Awards	8 December 2019	Best Editing	Aarif Sheikh	Won	
Zee Cine Awards	13 March 2020	Best Action	Paul Jennings, Oh Sea Young, Parvez Shaikh & Franz Spilhaus	Won	
Zee Cine Awards	13 March 2020	Best Choreography	Bosco–Caesar ("Jai Jai Shiv Shankar")	Won	
Zee Cine Awards	13 March 2020	Best Special Effects	YFX (YRF Studios)	Won	

== Sequel ==
At the launch of War, Anand confirmed that he was working on the script of its sequel and had plans to convert the film into a franchise, depending on the audience response to the film.

Roshan reprised his role as Kabir in the post-credit scene of Tiger 3 and in the 2026 film Alpha starring Alia Bhatt. A sequel titled War 2 directed by Ayan Mukerji, replacing Anand, released on 14 August 2025. It stars Hrithik Roshan, who reprises his role, alongside N. T. Rama Rao Jr. and Kiara Advani.

== See also ==
- Audi R8 and RISAT-2, spy gadgets featured in the film
