= Jat Education Society Rohtak =

Indian education society in Haryana

Jat education Society, Rohtak
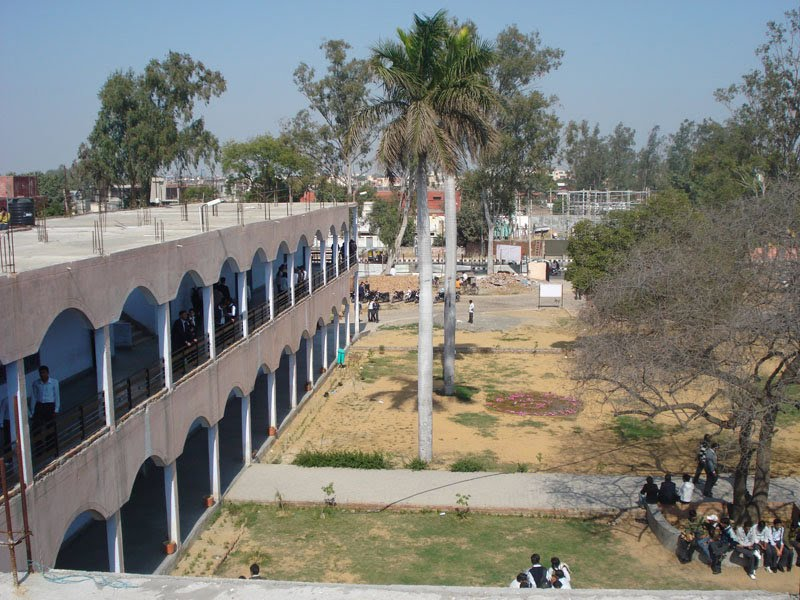
- Type: Public
- Established: 1914
- Chairman: Adc Rohtak
- Location: Rohtak, Haryana, India
- Campus: Urban
- Affiliations: Maharishi Dayanand University; All India Council for Technical Education
- Website: jatcollegerohtak.ac.in

Jat Education Society, Rohtak is an education society of Rohtak, Haryana, India.

== List of educational institutions ==
Following is a list of educational institutions that are run and managed by Jat Education Society, Rohtak.

- Chhotu Ram Polytechnic
- Chhotu Ram Memorial Public School
- Maharani Kishori Jat Kanya Mahavidyalaya
- Chhotu Ram College of Education
- Jat Heroes Memorial Anglo Sanskrit High School
- Jat Heroes Memorial Anglo Sanskrit Senior Secondary School
- Jat Heroes Memorial Anglo Sanskrit Primary School
- Sir Chotu Ram College Of Law

== Campus ==
Campus Of Jat Education Society, Rohtak is located on Eastern side of Rohtak, near Delhi by pass, next to MDU Rohtak. Its campus consists of 11 separate entities, hostels, playgrounds and parks.

== Gallery ==
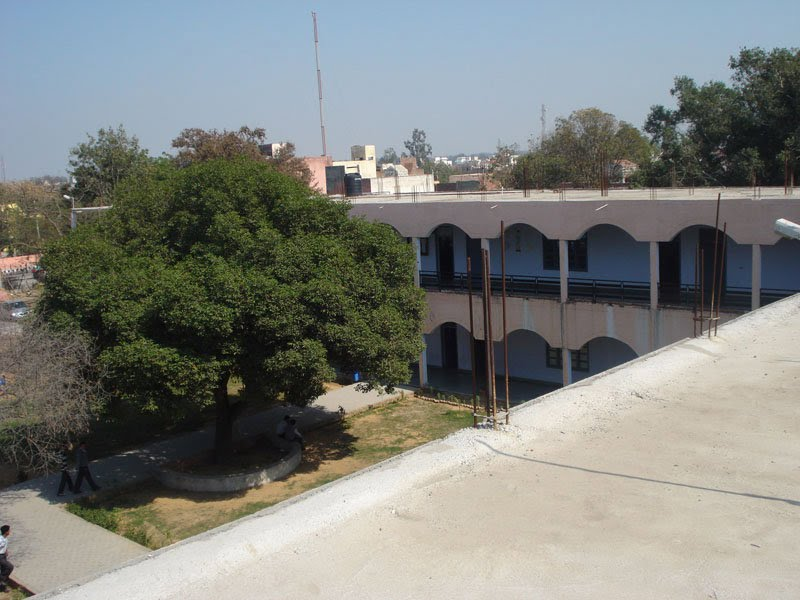

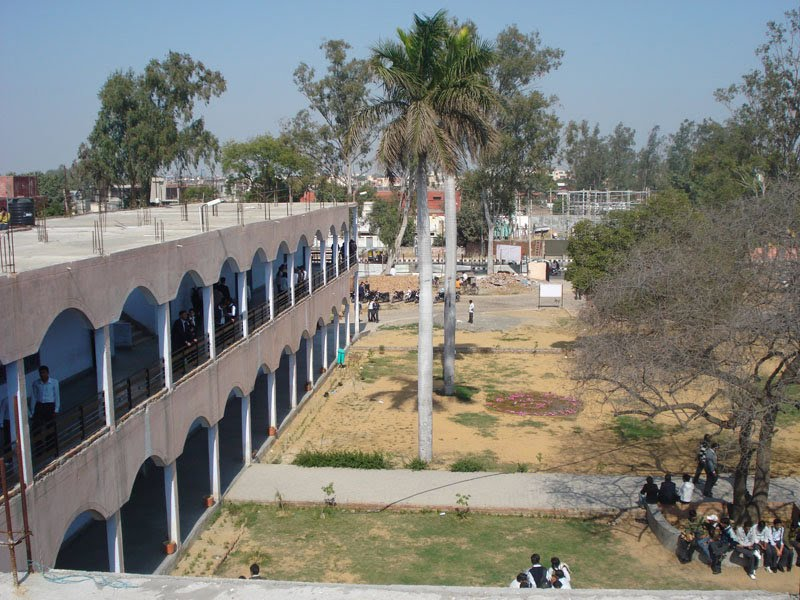

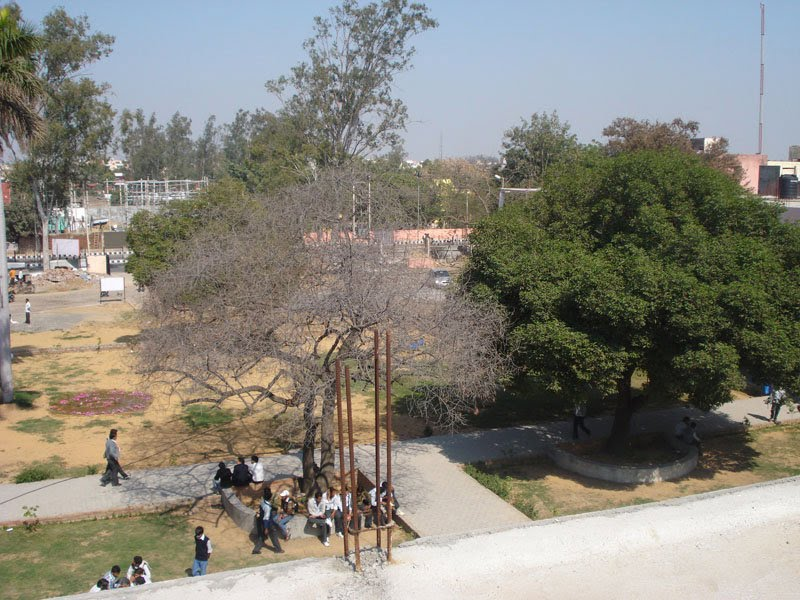
