= Siddharth Anand =

Indian filmmaker

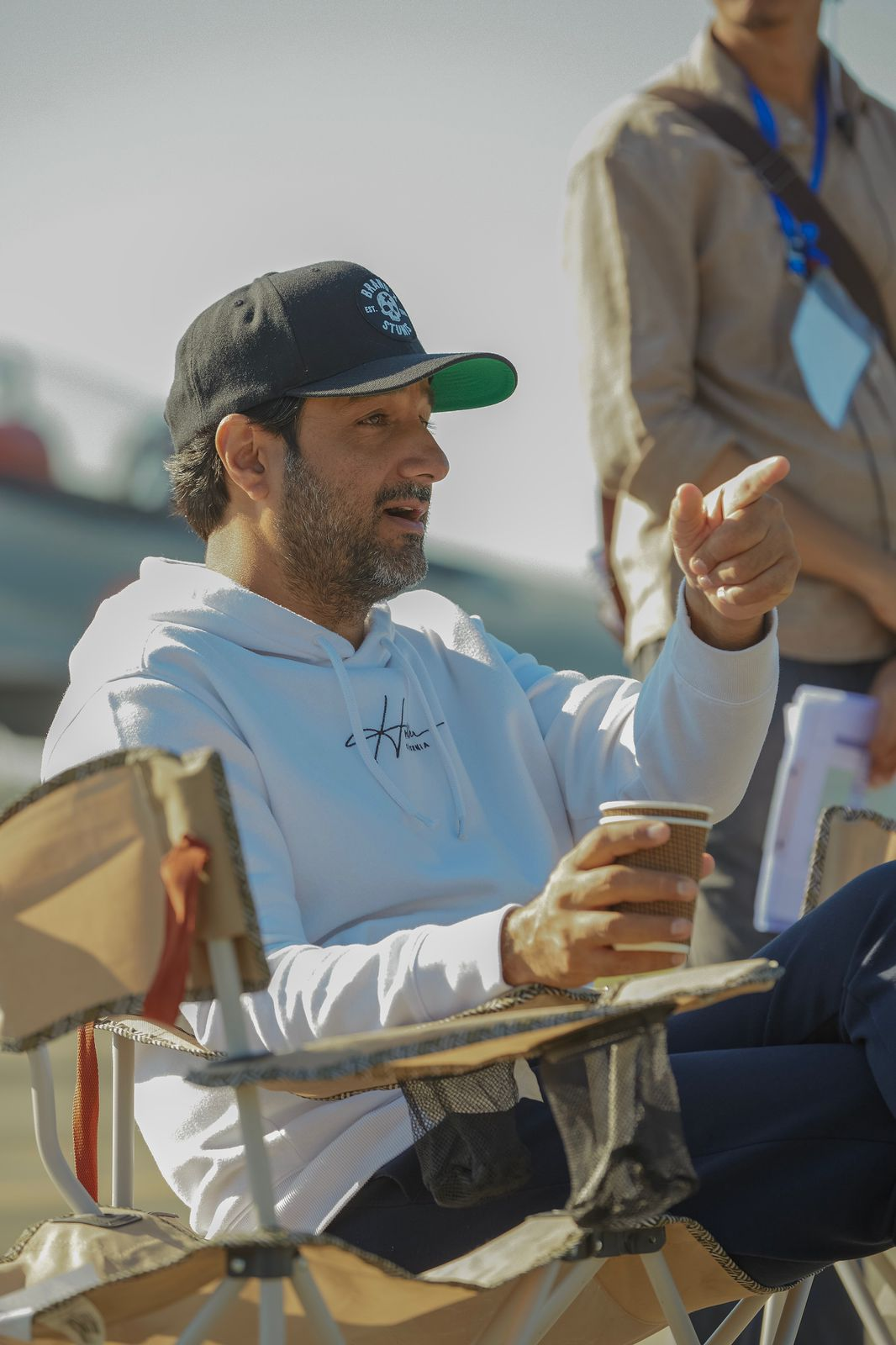
- Anand in 2022
- Born: Bombay, Maharashtra, India
- Occupations: Film director; screenwriter; producer
- Years active: 2001–present
- Spouse: Mamta Bhatia
- Children: 1

Siddharth Anand is an Indian filmmaker who primarily works in Hindi cinema. He is the grandson of screenwriter Inder Raj Anand.

Anand gained recognition for directing successful romantic comedies such as Salaam Namaste (2005), Ta Ra Rum Pum (2007), Bachna Ae Haseeno (2008), and Anjaana Anjaani (2010). He later directed action films such as Bang Bang! (2014), War (2019) and Pathaan (2023); the latter rank among the highest-grossing Hindi films.

In 2021, Anand launched his production company, Marflix Pictures. Its first release was the aerial action film Fighter (2024).

== Early and personal life ==
Anand's father is Bittu Anand, the producer of the vigilante action film Shahenshah (1988). His paternal grandfather was senior screenwriter Inder Raj Anand, his uncle is actor-director Tinnu Anand while the director Mukul Anand was a cousin of his father. He is married to Mamta Anand (née Bhatia), with whom he has a son, Ranveer. Along with his wife, he owns and runs the production company, Marflix Pictures.

== Career ==
=== Initial work, debut and breakthrough: 2001-2010 ===
Anand assisted director Kunal Kohli with the romantic comedy Mujhse Dosti Karoge (2002) and was promoted to an associate for Kohli's Hum Tum (2004), for which, as executive producer, he also co-wrote the screenplay. He made his directorial debut with the romantic comedy-drama Salaam Namaste (2005), produced by Yash Raj Films, which stars Saif Ali Khan and Preity Zinta in the lead roles. It received positive reviews from critics upon release and emerged as a commercial success.

Anand's second directorial venture was the sports drama Ta Ra Rum Pum (2007), which marked his third collaboration with Saif Ali Khan as well as Rani Mukerji. It receiving mixed reviews from critics and was a moderate success. His third and fourth directorial venture was the romantic comedies Bachna Ae Haseeno (2008) and Anjaana Anjaani (2010), both starred Ranbir Kapoor, film opened to mixed-to-positive reviews from critics and emerged as a commercial success.

=== Later career: 2014-present ===
In 2014, Anand made his foray into the action genre with Bang Bang!, starring Hrithik Roshan and Katrina Kaif in the lead roles. A remake of the 2010 American film Knight and Day, it opened to mixed reviews from critics; however, it emerged as a box office success. It was the year's fourth highest-grossing film and Anand's first film to reach the 100 crore club. It was followed by the action-thriller War (2019), starring Hrithik Roshan alongside Tiger Shroff and Vaani Kapoor. It received positive reviews and emerged as the highest-grossing film of that year.

In 2023, Anand directed the action thriller Pathaan (2023), which starred Shah Rukh Khan, Deepika Padukone, and John Abraham, and established the YRF Spy Universe. The film marked Khan's comeback to films following a four-year hiatus. Pathaan emerged as a commercial success, and entering the 1000 crore club worldwide, emerging as the fourth highest-grossing Hindi film domestically of its time. In 2024, Anand launched his production company, Marflix Pictures, where he directed and co-produced the aerial action thriller Fighter, which marked his third collaboration with Roshan and Padukone and first with Anil Kapoor. Fighter received mixed reviews from critics and was a commercial success. Nevertheless, it was year's fourth highest-grossing film. In the same year, he also co-produced Jewel Thief, directed by Robbie Grewal, which starred Saif Ali Khan and Jaideep Ahlawat.

His next directorial and production venture is King, which will mark his second collaboraton Shah Rukh Khan and the theatrical debut of his daughter.

== Filmography ==
Year	Title	Director	Writer	Producer	Notes
2004	Hum Tum	No	Yes	Executive	Co-wrote screenplay with Kunal Kohli
2005	Salaam Namaste	Yes	Yes	No	
2007	Ta Ra Rum Pum	Yes	Story	No	
2008	Bachna Ae Haseeno	Yes	No	No	
2010	Anjaana Anjaani	Yes	Yes	No	Co-wrote screenplay with Advaita Kala Also dialogue writer
2014	Bang Bang!	Yes	Story Adaptation	No	Official remake of Knight and Day
2019	War	Yes	Yes	No	Co-wrote story and screenplayThird installment of YRF Spy Universe
2023	Pathaan	Yes	Story	No	Fourth instalment of YRF Spy Universe
2024	Fighter	Yes	Story	Yes	Co-wrote story with Ramon Chibb.
2025	Jewel Thief	No	No	Yes	Released on Netflix
2026	King	Yes	Yes	Yes	Co-produced with Red Chillies Entertainment

As assistant director

- Kuch Khatti Kuch Meethi (2001)
- Mujhse Dosti Karoge! (2002)
- Hum Tum (2004)

=== Television ===
Year	Title	Writer	Producer	Notes
2020	Flesh	Story	Yes	8 Episodes
