= Dileep Padgaonkar =

Journalist (1944–2016)

Dileep Padgaonkar (1944 - 2016) was the Editor of The Times of India. He was Editor from 1986 to 1994. He was awarded the Légion d'honneur in 2002 for his contribution to Journalism.
