= Vicky Donor (soundtrack) =

2012 soundtrack album

Soundtrack album by Abhishek–Akshay, Bann Chakraborty, Rochak Kohli and Ayushmann Khurrana
- Released: 29 February 2012
- Genre: Feature film soundtrack
- Length: 35:13
- Label: Eros Music
- Producer: John Abraham

Singles from Vicky Donor
- 1. "Pani Da Rang" Released: 1 February 2012

Vicky Donor is the soundtrack album to the 2012 film of the same name directed by Shoojit Sircar and produced by John Abraham, starring Ayushmann Khurrana and Yami Gautam, in their film debuts. The film's soundtrack consisted of eight songs jointly composed by Abhishek–Akshay, Bann Chakraborty, Rochak Kohli and Khurrana, with lyrics written by Akshay Verma, Juhi Chaturvedi, Khurrana, Kohli, Swanand Kirkire and Vijay Maurya. The album was preceded by the single "Pani Da Rang" and was released through Eros Music on 1 February 2012. The music, particularly the song "Pani Da Rang", was well received by music critics and Khurrana won the Filmfare Award for Best Male Playback Singer for the song.

== Background ==
The soundtrack album features eight tracks which were composed by Abhishek–Akshay, Bann Chakraborty, Rochak Kohli and Ayushmann Khurrana. All of them contributed two tracks each. Actor Khurrana also composed and sang the track "Pani Da Rang", which was released as a single on 1 February 2012. The song was written with Kohli in 2003, during their time at DAV College, Chandigarh. He used to carry the guitar to the film sets to inform Shoojit Sircar that he had composed a song and inquired him whether he wanted to hear it. Khurrana performed few lines of the song which Sircar had liked and had included in the film. He further stated that he included a few lines in the last paragraph as the character is singing the song on the terrace. The song entirely consisted of Punjabi lyrics.

== Release ==
The film's soundtrack was launched at a private mall in Mumbai on 29 February 2012, with the cast and crew in attendance. Eros Music distributed the soundtrack and released in digital and physical platforms.

== Reception ==
The soundtrack album received positive reviews from critics and listeners. A reviewer based at Indo-Asian News Service stated "Vicky Donor is a good effort and the coming together of various artists makes it worth a listen." Karthik Srinivasan of Milliblog called it as a "Well put-together, enjoyable soundtrack". Joginder Tuteja of Bollywood Hungama wrote "Music of Vicky Donor turns out to be better than expected. Even though there is a mandatory 'bhangra' number 'Rum Whiskey' to take care of the album from commercial standpoint, it is songs like 'Mar Jayian' and 'Pani Da Rang' which are indeed the pick of the lot."

== Track listing ==
No.	Title	Lyrics	Music	Artist(s)	Length
1.	"Rokda"	Akshay Verma	Abhishek–Akshay	Akshay Verma, Aditi Singh Sharma	4:28
2.	"Kho Jaane De"	Juhi Chaturvedi	Rochak Kohli	Clinton Cerejo, Aditi Singh Sharma	4:57
3.	"Rum Whisky"	Kusum Verma	Abhishek–Akshay	Akshay Verma	4:04
4.	"Pani Da Rang" (Male)	Ayushmann Khurrana, Rochak Kohli	Ayushmann Khurrana	Ayushmann Khurrana	4:00
5.	"Mar Jayian" (Romantic)	Swanand Kirkire	Bann Chakraborty	Vishal Dadlani, Sunidhi Chauhan	4:48
6.	"Chaddha"	Vijay Maurya	Rochak Kohli	Rahul Sharma	3:50
7.	"Pani Da Rang" (Female)	Ayushmann Khurrana, Rochak Kohli	Ayushmann Khurrana	Sukanya Purkayastha	4:49
8.	"Mar Jayian" (Sad)	Swanand Kirkire	Bann Chakraborty	Bann Chakraborty	4:14
Total length:					35:13

== Accolades ==
Date of ceremony	Award	Category	Recipient(s) and nominee(s)	Result	Ref.
20 January 2013	Filmfare Awards	Best Male Playback Singer	Ayushmann Khurrana (for the song "Pani Da Rang")	Won	
12 January 2013	Star Screen Awards	Best Lyrics	Ayushmann Khurrana, Rochak Kohli (for the song "Pani Da Rang")	Nominated	
12 January 2013	Star Screen Awards	Best Male Playback Singer	Ayushmann Khurrana (for the song "Pani Da Rang")	Nominated	
16 February 2013	Producers Guild Film Awards	Best Lyricist	Ayushmann Khurrana, Rochak Kohli (for the song "Pani Da Rang")	Nominated	
16 February 2013	Producers Guild Film Awards	Best Male Playback Singer	Ayushmann Khurrana (for the song "Pani Da Rang")	Won	
6 April 2013	Times of India Film Awards	Best Male Playback Singer	Ayushmann Khurrana (for the song "Pani Da Rang")	Nominated	
6 July 2013	International Indian Film Academy Awards	Best Lyricist	Ayushmann Khurrana, Rochak Kohli (for the song "Pani Da Rang")	Nominated	
6 July 2013	International Indian Film Academy Awards	Best Male Playback Singer	Ayushmann Khurrana (for the song "Pani Da Rang")	Nominated	
31 December 2012	Big Star Entertainment Awards	Most Entertaining Song	Ayushmann Khurrana, Rochak Kohli (for the song "Pani Da Rang")	Won	
7 February 2013	Mirchi Music Awards	Song of the Year	Ayushmann Khurrana (for the song "Pani Da Rang")	Nominated	
7 February 2013	Mirchi Music Awards	Upcoming Male Vocalist of the Year	Ayushmann Khurrana (for the song "Pani Da Rang")	Nominated	
7 February 2013	Mirchi Music Awards	Upcoming Music Composer of the Year	Donn & Bann (for the song "Marr Jayian")	Nominated	
7 February 2013	Mirchi Music Awards	Upcoming Music Composer of the Year	Ayushmann Khurrana, Rochak Kohli (for the song "Pani Da Rang")	Won	
7 February 2013	Mirchi Music Awards	Upcoming Lyricist of the Year	Ayushmann Khurrana, Rochak Kohli (for the song "Pani Da Rang")	Won	
7 February 2013	Mirchi Music Awards	Technical Sound Engineering of the Year	Anish Gohil, Biswadeep Chatterjee	Nominated	
7 February 2013	Mirchi Music Awards	Technical Programmer and Arranger of the Year	Abhijit Nalani	Nominated	
26 January 2013	Stardust Awards	New Musical Sensation (Male)	Ayushmann Khurrana (for the song "Pani Da Rang")	Won	
26 January 2013	Stardust Awards	Standout Performance by a New Lyricist	Ayushmann Khurrana, Rochak Kohli (for the song "Pani Da Rang")	Nominated	
1 October 2012	Global Indian Music Academy Awards	Star Plus Hottest Song of the Year	Ayushmann Khurrana, Rochak Kohli (for the song "Pani Da Rang")	Won	
