= 19th Screen Awards =

Indian film awards ceremony in 2013

- Date: 12 January 2013
- Site: MMRDA Grounds, Mumbai
- Hosted by: Shahrukh Khan

Highlights
- Best Picture: Paan Singh Tomar
- Best Direction: Anurag Basu (Barfi!)
- Best Actor: Irrfan Khan and Ranbir Kapoor (Paan Singh Tomar and Barfi!)
- Best Actress: Vidya Balan (Kahaani)
- Most awards: Barfi! (8)
- Most nominations: Barfi! (22)

Television coverage
- Channel: Colors TV
- Network: Viacom18

The 19th Screen Awards also 19th Annual Colors Screen Awards ceremony, presented by Indian Express Group, honored the best Indian Hindi-language films of 2012. The ceremony was held on 12 January 2013 at MMRDA Grounds, Mumbai. Hosted by Shahrukh Khan and co-hosted by Ayushmann Khurrana, Karan Johar and Vidya Balan.

Barfi! led the ceremony with 22 nominations, followed by Gangs of Wasseypur with 19 nominations and Kahaani with 15 nominations each.

Barfi! won 8 awards, including Best Director (for Anurag Basu) and Best Actor (for Ranbir Kapoor), thus becoming the most-awarded film at the ceremony.

== Awards ==
The winners and nominees have been listed below. Winners are listed first, highlighted in boldface, and indicated with a double dagger (‡).

=== Jury Awards ===
Best Film	Best Director
**Paan Singh Tomar**‡; Barfi!; English Vinglish; Gangs of Wasseypur; Kahaani; Vicky Donor	**Anurag Basu – Barfi!**‡; Anurag Kashyap – Gangs of Wasseypur; Shoojit Sircar – Vicky Donor; Sujoy Ghosh – Kahaani; Tigmanshu Dhulia – Paan Singh Tomar
Best Actor	Best Actress
**Irrfan Khan – Paan Singh Tomar**‡; **Ranbir Kapoor – Barfi!**‡; Aamir Khan – Talaash: The Answer Lies Within; Hrithik Roshan – Agneepath; Manoj Bajpayee – Gangs of Wasseypur; Salman Khan – Dabangg 2; Shah Rukh Khan – Jab Tak Hai Jaan	**Vidya Balan – Kahaani**‡; Deepika Padukone – Cocktail; Kareena Kapoor – Heroine; Parineeti Chopra – Ishaqzaade; Priyanka Chopra – Barfi!; Sridevi – English Vinglish
Best Supporting Actor	Best Supporting Actress
**Nawazuddin Siddiqui – Talaash: The Answer Lies Within**‡; Akshay Kumar – OMG – Oh My God!; Emraan Hashmi – Shanghai; Jameel Khan – Gangs of Wasseypur; Parambrata Chatterjee – Kahaani; Rishi Kapoor – Student of the Year	**Dolly Ahluwalia – Vicky Donor**‡; Anushka Sharma – Jab Tak Hai Jaan; Huma Qureshi – Gangs of Wasseypur; Ileana D'Cruz – Barfi!; Rani Mukerji – Talaash: The Answer Lies Within; Richa Chadda – Gangs of Wasseypur
Best Actor in a Negative Role – Male / Female	Best Actor in a Comic Role – Male / Female
**Tigmanshu Dhulia** – **Gangs of Wasseypur**‡; Bipasha Basu – Raaz 3: The Third Dimension; Deepak Dobriyal – Dabangg 2; Mithun Chakraborty – OMG – Oh My God!; Rishi Kapoor – Agneepath; Sanjay Dutt – Agneepath	**Abhishek Bachchan** – **Bol Bachchan**‡; **Annu Kapoor** – **Vicky Donor**‡; Kamlesh Gill – Vicky Donor; Rajesh Sharma – Luv Shuv Tey Chicken Khurana; Riteish Deshmukh – Kyaa Super Kool Hain Hum; Tusshar Kapoor – Kyaa Super Kool Hain Hum
Best Child Artist	Most Promising Debut Director
**Mohammad Samad** – **Gattu**‡; Lehar Khan – Jalpari: The Desert Mermaid; Ritvik Sahore – Ferrari Ki Sawaari	**Gauri Shinde – English Vinglish**‡; Arbaaz Khan – Dabangg 2; Karan Malhotra – Agneepath; Rajesh Mapuskar – Ferrari Ki Sawaari; Sameer Sharma – Luv Shuv Tey Chicken Khurana; Shakun Batra – Ek Main Aur Ekk Tu
Most Promising Newcomer – Male	Most Promising Newcomer – Female
**Ayushmann Khurrana – Vicky Donor**‡; Arjun Kapoor – Ishaqzaade; Kayoze Irani – Student of the Year; Parambrata Chatterjee – Kahaani; Sidharth Malhotra – Student of the Year; Varun Dhawan – Student of the Year	**Ileana D'Cruz – Barfi!**‡; Alia Bhatt – Student of the Year; Anjali Patil – Chakravyuh; Diana Penty – Cocktail; Huma Qureshi – Gangs of Wasseypur; Yami Gautam – Vicky Donor
Best Music Director	Best Lyricist
**Pritam – Barfi!**‡; Amit Trivedi – Ishaqzaade; Pritam – Cocktail; Ram Sampath – Talaash: The Answer Lies Within; Sajid–Wajid – Dabangg 2; Sneha Khanwalkar – Gangs of Wasseypur; Vishal–Shekhar – Student of the Year	**Javed Akhtar – "Muskaanein Jhooti Hai" – Talaash: The Answer Lies Within**‡; Ayushmann Khurrana, Rochak Kohli – "Pani Da Rang" – Vicky Donor; Dibakar Banerjee – "Bharat Mata Ki Jai" – Shanghai; Gulzar – "Saans" – Jab Tak Hai Jaan; Sameer Anjaan – "Dagabaaz Re" – Dabangg 2; Swanand Kirkire – "Aashiyan" – Barfi!
Best Male Playback Singer	Best Female Playback Singer
**Javed Ali – "Ishaqzaade" – Ishaqzaade**‡; Ayushmann Khurrana – "Pani Da Rang" – Vicky Donor; Mika Singh – "Pyaar ki Pungi" – Agent Vinod; Mohit Chauhan – "Ala Barfi" – Barfi!; Nikhil Paul George – "Main Kya Karoon" – Barfi!	**Shalmali Kholgade – "Pareshaan" – Ishaqzaade**‡; Kavita Seth – "Tumhi Ho Bandhu" – Cocktail; Mamta Sharma – "Fevicol Se" – Dabangg 2; Nandini Srikar – "Dil Mera Muft Ka" – Agent Vinod; Neeti Mohan – "Jiya Re" – Jab Tak Hai Jaan; Shreya Ghoshal – "Radha" – Student of the Year

=== Technical Awards ===
Best Story	Best Screenplay
**Advaita Kala, Sujoy Ghosh** – **Kahaani**‡; Anurag Basu – Barfi!; Gauri Shinde – English Vinglish; Juhi Chaturvedi – Vicky Donor; Reema Kagti, Zoya Akhtar – Talaash: The Answer Lies Within; Sanjay Chauhan, Tigmanshu Dhulia – Paan Singh Tomar	**Sanjay Chauhan, Tigmanshu Dhulia** – **Paan Singh Tomar**‡; Anurag Basu – Barfi!; Gauri Shinde – English Vinglish; Habib Faisal – Ishaqzaade; Sujoy Ghosh – Kahaani
Best Dialogue	Best Background Music
**Bhavesh Mandalia, Umesh Shukla** – **OMG – Oh My God!**‡; Anurag Kashyap, Zeishan Quadri – Gangs of Wasseypur; Dilip Shukla – Dabangg 2; Habib Faisal – Ishaqzaade; Sanjay Chauhan, Tigmanshu Dhulia – Paan Singh Tomar	**Pritam** – **Barfi!**‡; Amit Trivedi – English Vinglish; Clinton Cerejo – Kahaani; Ranjit Barot – Ishaqzaade; Sandeep Chowta – Paan Singh Tomar
Best Editing	Best Cinematography
**Namrata Rao** – **Kahaani**‡; Aarti Bajaj – Paan Singh Tomar; Akiv Ali – Barfi!; Chandrashekhar Prajapati – Vicky Donor; Hemanti Sarkar – English Vinglish; Shweta Venkat Matthew – Gangs of Wasseypur	**Ravi Varman** – **Barfi!**‡; Anil Mehta – Jab Tak Hai Jaan; K. U. Mohanan – Talaash: The Answer Lies Within; Kiran Deohans, Ravi K. Chandran – Agneepath; Rajeev Ravi – Gangs of Wasseypur; Setu – Kahaani
Best Costume Design	Best Choreography
**Anaita Shroff Adajania** – **Cocktail**‡; Aki Narula, Shefalina – Barfi!; Namratha Jani, Sachin Lovalekar – Paan Singh Tomar; Subodh Srivastava – Gangs of Wasseypur; Varsha–Shilpa – Ishaqzaade	**Prabhu Deva, Vishnu Deva** – **"Go Go Go Govinda"** – **OMG – Oh My God!**‡; Chinni Prakash – "Pandey Jee Seeti" – Dabangg 2; Farah Khan – "Fevicol Se" – Dabangg 2; Ganesh Acharya – "Chikni Chameli" – Agneepath; Chinni Prakash, Rekha Chinni Prakash – "Jhallah Wallah" – Ishaqzaade; Vaibhavi Merchant – "Ishq Shava" – Jab Tak Hai Jaan
Best Production Design	Best Sound Design
**Kaushik Das, Subrata Barik** – **Kahaani**‡; Mansi Dhruv Mehta, Vinod Kumar – Vicky Donor; Rajat Poddar – Barfi!; Sabu Cyril – Agneepath; Samir Chanda – Chittagong; Wasiq Khan – Gangs of Wasseypur	**Allwyn Rego, Sanjay Maurya** – **Kahaani**‡; Kunal Sharma – Gangs of Wasseypur; Pritam Das – Shanghai; Rakesh Ranjan – Paan Singh Tomar; Shajith Koyeri – Barfi!
Best Animation	Best Action
**Delhi Safari**‡; Arjun: The Warrior Prince	**Shyam Kaushal** – **Gangs of Wasseypur**‡; Abbas Ali Moghul – Agneepath; Anal Arasu – Dabangg 2; Anal Arasu – Rowdy Rathore; Conrad Palmisano – Ek Tha Tiger
Best Ensemble Cast	Best Film–Marketing
**Gangs of Wasseypur**‡; Bol Bachchan; Kahaani; Luv Shuv Tey Chicken Khurana; Paan Singh Tomar	**Barfi!**‡; Cocktail; English Vinglish; Gangs of Wasseypur; Kahaani

=== Popular Choice Awards ===
Best Actor	Best Actress
**Salman Khan** – **Dabangg 2, Ek Tha Tiger**‡; Aamir Khan – Talaash: The Answer Lies Within; Abhishek Bachchan – Bol Bachchan; Ajay Devgn – Bol Bachchan, Son of Sardaar; Akshay Kumar – Housefull 2, OMG – Oh My God!, Rowdy Rathore; Emraan Hashmi – Jannat 2, Raaz 3: The Third Dimension; Hrithik Roshan – Agneepath; Imran Khan – Ek Main Aur Ekk Tu; Ranbir Kapoor – Barfi!; Saif Ali Khan – Cocktail; Shah Rukh Khan – Jab Tak Hai Jaan	**Katrina Kaif** – **Ek Tha Tiger, Jab Tak Hai Jaan**‡; Anushka Sharma – Jab Tak Hai Jaan; Asin – Bol Bachchan, Housefull 2; Deepika Padukone – Cocktail; Kareena Kapoor – Ek Main Aur Ekk Tu, Talaash: The Answer Lies Within; Priyanka Chopra – Barfi!; Sonakshi Sinha – Dabangg 2, Rowdy Rathore, Son of Sardaar; Sridevi – English Vinglish; Vidya Balan – Kahaani

=== Special awards ===
Lifetime Achievement Award
- **Yash Chopra**
Legend of Indian Cinema Award
- **Amitabh Bachchan**
Ramnath Goenka Award
- **Gangs of Wasseypur**
Jodi No. 1
- **Ranbir Kapoor** & **Priyanka Chopra** (Barfi!)
Best Entertainer Of The Year
- **Salman Khan**

== Superlatives ==
Multiple nominations
Nominations	Film
22	Barfi!
19	Gangs of Wasseypur
15	Kahaani
12	Dabangg 2
12	Vicky Donor
11	Paan Singh Tomar
10	Ishaqzaade
9	Agneepath
9	English Vinglish
9	Jab Tak Hai Jaan
9	Talaash: The Answer Lies Within
8	Cocktail
7	Student of the Year
5	Bol Bachchan
5	OMG – Oh My God!
3	Ek Main Aur Ekk Tu
3	Ek Tha Tiger
3	Luv Shuv Tey Chicken Khurana
3	Rowdy Rathore
3	Shanghai
2	Agent Vinod
2	Ferrari Ki Sawaari
2	Housefull 2
2	Kyaa Super Kool Hain Hum
2	Raaz 3: The Third Dimension
2	Son of Sardaar

Multiple wins
Awards	Film
8	Barfi!
5	Kahaani
4	Gangs of Wasseypur
3	Paan Singh Tomar
3	Vicky Donor
2	Ek Tha Tiger
2	Ishaqzaade
2	OMG – Oh My God!
2	Talaash: The Answer Lies Within
