= Stardust Award for Best Actor =

Film award in India

The Stardust Best Actor is chosen by the readers of the annual Stardust magazine. The award honours a star that has made an impact with their acting in that certain film. Here is a list of the award winners and the films for which they won since 2009.

Year	Actor	Film
2009	Akshay Kumar	8 x 10 Tasveer
2010	Amitabh Bachchan	The Last Lear
2011	Rishi Kapoor	Do Dooni Chaar
2012	Gulshan Grover	I Am Kalam
2013	Ayushmann Khurrana; Manoj Bajpai	Vicky Donor; Gangs of Wasseypur
2014	Randeep Hooda	Highway
2015	Amitabh Bachchan	Piku
2016	Amitabh Bachchan	Pink
2017	Shahrukh Khan; Salman Khan	Raees; Tiger Zinda Hai

== See also ==
- Stardust Awards
- Bollywood
- Cinema of India
