= Abhi Mujh Mein Kahin =

Song by Sonu Nigam

from the album Agneepath
- Language: Hindi
- English title: "Still, somewhere inside me"
- Released: 11 December 2011
- Recorded: 2011
- Genre: Filmi
- Length: 6:51
- Label: Sony Music India
- Composer: Ajay–Atul
- Lyricist: Amitabh Bhattacharya

"Abhi Mujh Mein Kahin" (transl. Still, somewhere inside me) is a song from the film Agneepath, sung by Sonu Nigam, with music by Ajay–Atul and lyrics by Amitabh Bhattacharya and was picturized on Hrithik Roshan and Priyanka Chopra. This song describes many feelings in a single line. It describes the short life of love too.

== Reception ==
Bollywood Hungama: "Sonu Nigam, who is always a delight to listen to, especially when it comes to soulful romantic tracks, strikes again with 'Abhi Mujh Mein Kahin'. Just the kind of song that was pretty much required to give a sense of completeness to Agneepath, this one also boasts of some poetic writing by Amitabh Bhattacharya. Even though it isn't catchy enough to become the next big chartbuster, 'Abhi Mujh Mein Kahin' still has good enough holding power to keep you engaged while it plays."

Rediff: "The album enters a dramatic mood shift when Sonu Nigam hits a silvery note to muse over the philosophy of life and its many challenges in the sentimental poetry and easygoing pace of Abhi Mujh Mein Kahin. Nicely done, Ajay-Atul."

Koimoi: "Abhi mujh mein kahi is a soothing romantic track sung by Sonu Nigam. The song is mellow, gentle, romantic and contemplative. Nigam's vocal dexterity has been very successful in conveying the intensity of the song. The violin also has been marvelously used in the song."

== Awards and nominations ==
The song was popular and won the following awards:

- Mirchi Music Award for Song of The Decade 2021
- Mirchi Music Award for Song of The Year 2012
- Mirchi Music Award for Male Vocalist of The Year 2012 - Sonu Nigam
- Mirchi Music Award for Music Composer of The Year 2012 - Ajay–Atul
- 14th IIFA Award for Best Lyrics — Amitabh Bhattacharya
- 14th IIFA Award for Best Playback Singer (Male) - Sonu Nigam
- Zee Cine Award for Best Playback Singer (Male) - Sonu Nigam

The song was also nominated for the following:

=== 58th Filmfare Awards ===
- Filmfare Award for Best Lyricist — Amitabh Bhattacharya

=== 5th Mirchi Music Awards ===
- Lyricist of The Year - Amitabh Bhattacharya
- Song Recording/Sound Engineering of the Year - Vijay Dayal

=== Others ===
GiMA Award for Best Lyricist — Amitabh Bhattacharya
