= Student of the Year =

2012 Indian film by Karan Johar

- Theatrical release poster
- Directed by: Karan Johar
- Written by: Rensil D'Silva; Niranjan Iyengar
- Story by: Karan Johar
- Produced by: Hiroo Yash Johar; Gauri Khan
- Starring: Sidharth Malhotra; Alia Bhatt; Varun Dhawan; Rishi Kapoor
- Narrated by: Sahil Anand; Manasi Rachh; Sana Saeed; Kayoze Irani; Manjot Singh
- Cinematography: Ayananka Bose
- Edited by: Deepa Bhatia
- Music by: Vishal-Shekhar
- Production companies: Dharma Productions; Red Chillies Entertainment
- Distributed by: India: AA Films; International: Eros International
- Release date: 19 October 2012
- Running time: 146 minutes
- Country: India
- Language: Hindi
- Budget: ₹59 crore
- Box office: ₹97-109 crore

Student of the Year is a 2012 Indian Hindi-language romantic comedy-drama film directed by Karan Johar, written by Rensil D'Silva and Niranjan Iyengar with an uncredited story by Johar, and produced by Dharma Productions and Red Chillies Entertainment. The film stars debutantes Sidharth Malhotra, Alia Bhatt and Varun Dhawan with an ensemble supporting cast consisting of Rishi Kapoor, Ronit Roy, Sahil Anand, Manjot Singh, Ram Kapoor and Farida Jalal, while former child artists Sana Saeed and Kayoze Irani, whose father Boman appears in a brief role, make their screen debuts as adults. The music was composed by Vishal–Shekhar, while cinematography and editing were handled by Ayananka Bose and Deepa Bhatia.

Student of the Year was released on 19 October 2012 in India and emerged as a commercial success at the box office. It received mixed-to-positive reviews from critics with praise for its cast performances, technical aspects, direction and music, but criticized its script. At the 58th Filmfare Awards, Student of the Year received 4 nominations including Best Male Debut (Malhotra and Dhawan) and Best Female Debut (Bhatt), and won the R. D. Burman Award for New Music Talent (Neeti Mohan for "Ishq Wala Love").

A standalone sequel titled Student of the Year 2 was released on 10 May 2019 with Punit Malhotra as director and Tiger Shroff, Tara Sutaria and Ananya Pandey in the lead roles. Although speculations were rife about the three leads from the original returning for a special appearance, only Bhatt made the cut in a song opposite Shroff. Anand and Singh also reprised their roles in the sequel as commentators.

== Plot ==
At the esteemed St. Teresa's College, Rohan "Ro" Nanda is the handsome, rich, and popular younger son of its trustee, Ashok Nanda, an influential business tycoon. Ashok dislikes Ro’s passion for music and wants him to become a businessman like his elder son, Ajay. Shanaya Singhania, a beautiful, rich, and popular girl at college, is Rohan’s girlfriend and feels dissatisfied with Ro's constant flirtations with her rival, Tanya Israni. Abhimanyu "Abhi" Singh, a handsome new student from a middle-class family who idolizes Ashok, soon becomes the college's heartthrob. Abhi is an orphan whose grandmother is the only person he truly loves. He and Ro initially do not get along, but soon become best friends after a football match. Ro introduces him to Shanaya, reminding him not to get involved with her, and Abhi maintains that he is uninterested. The trio eventually become close friends.

At Ajay's wedding, Shanaya sees Ro flirting with Tanya and feels betrayed. She openly flirts with Abhi, who tacitly hints her off to make Ro jealous. Abhi starts falling for Shanaya but keeps his feelings to himself. Back at the school, the annual Student of the Year competition commences under Dean Yogendra "Yogi" Vashisht. The game rounds are a quiz test, a treasure hunt and a dance battle. Shanaya slowly develops feelings for Abhi over the course of the competition. The trio passes the quiz test and treasure hunt, but before the dance battle, Abhi's grandmother becomes ill and dies. After comforting Abhi, Shanaya and Abhi kiss in a tender moment, which Ro witnesses. Ro & Abhi fight, resulting in a fallout between him, Abhi, and Shanaya. Following an intense confrontation regarding his future with Ashok back home, Ro becomes determined to win the competition. Shanaya and her best friend Shruti Pathak fall out over the competition, much like Ro and his longtime friend Jeet Khurana after Jeet asks Shanaya to be his dance partner. Shanaya, conflicted by her feelings, leaves in the middle of the dance battle and gets eliminated, while Ro and Abhi proceed to the final round.

The final round of the competition is a triathlon consisting of swimming, cycling and long-distance running. Abhi, in the lead, slows down at the end after realizing how important the competition is for Ro, resulting in Ro winning the competition. However, Ro declines to accept the award, citing personal reasons. After Ro steps down, Yogi is heavily berated by Ro and Abhi’s mutual friend Kaizad "Sudo" Sodabottleopenerwala, who rants about how the entire concept of the Student of the Year competition has always been rigged. He claims the competition broke their friendship of two years and was unfair to people like him, who were not as popular and attractive as Abhi or Ro. This causes Yogi to retire eventually. The students soon graduate and lose contact with each other.

Ten years later, Yogi, terminally ill and on his deathbed, requests to see the students from his last batch. Some arrive to meet him, along with former coach Karan Shah, and hold themselves responsible for Yogi's illness. Ro is now a rock musician, and Abhi is now an investment banker married to Shanaya. They run into each other when they visit Yogi; in an argument that initially starts off over their shared history and conduct with Shanaya, the two begin releasing the anger they have held back for the last ten years. Ro ultimately reveals he is greatly pissed off at what he considers an intentional move on Abhi's part to lose the triathlon; Abhi reveals that he intentionally allowed Ro to win after noticing Ashok was happy to see his son losing, and it was his way of surpassing Ashok in stature. While bickering, they end up in a friendly banter, much like in college, and finally reconcile, rekindling their friendship. Yogi apologises to his former students and dies at peace. Ro and Abhi have a friendly running race on the same college field, which they ran during the competition.

== Cast ==
- Sidharth Malhotra as Abhimanyu "Abhi" Singh, Ro’s best friend and Shanaya's husband
- Alia Bhatt as Shanaya Singhania/Singh, Ro’s ex-girlfriend and Abhi’s wife
- Varun Dhawan as Rohan "Ro" Nanda, Abhi’s best friend and Shanaya’s ex-boyfriend
- Rishi Kapoor as Yogendra "Yogi" Vashisht, Dean of Saint Teresa
- Ronit Roy as Coach Karan Shah, Sports teacher of Saint Teresa
- Ram Kapoor as Ashok Nanda, Gayatri's husband, Ro's father
- Sana Saeed as Tanya Israni, Ro's one-sided love-interest
- Sahil Anand as Jeet Khurana, Ro's sidekick
- Manasi Rachh as Shruti Pathak, Shanaya's best friend
- Kayoze Irani as Kaizad "Sudo" Sodabottleopenerwala, Shanaya, Abhi, Ro, Tanya, Jeet, and Shruti's friend
- Manjot Singh as Dimple "Dimpy" Singh
- Gautami Kapoor as Gayatri Nanda, Ashok's wife, Ro's mother
- Farida Jalal as Sadhna Singh, Abhi's grandmother
- Akshay Anand as Dharamraj Singh, Abhi's uncle
- Manini Mishra as Geeta Singh, Abhi's aunt
- Prachi Shah as Ruchi Shah, Karan's wife
- Nandini Sen as Kamini Singhania, Shanaya's mother
- Boman Irani as Harikishan Sanon, Dean of Saint Lawrence
- Sushma Seth as Archana Vashisht, Yogi's mother
- Farah Khan as a judge in "The Disco Song" (special appearance)
- Vaibhavi Merchant as a judge in "The Disco Song" (special appearance)
- Kajol as herself in "The Disco Song" (special appearance)

== Production ==
=== Development ===
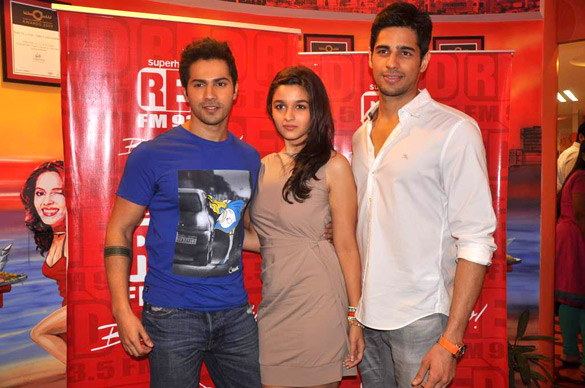
Dhawan, Bhatt, and Malhotra at the trailer launch of SOTY in 2012

On 5 January 2011, both Karan Johar and Shah Rukh Khan uploaded the film's first poster on Twitter. The film marks the debuts of former model Sidharth Malhotra along with Alia Bhatt, daughter of filmmaker Mahesh Bhatt, Varun Dhawan, son of director David Dhawan, Kayoze Irani, son of Boman Irani, and as an adult, Sana Saeed, who portrayed Khan's screen daughter, in Kuch Kuch Hota Hai (1998), Johar's debut in Hindi cinema. This is the first Karan Johar film without Shah Rukh Khan in the lead role.

Malhotra and Dhawan had previously worked as assistant directors under Johar during the making of My Name Is Khan (2010).

The first official trailer was released on 2 August 2012. Johar later tweeted that the film will be released on 19 October 2012.

=== Filming ===
Filming began on 16 August 2011 at Yash Raj Studios in Mumbai. Most parts of the film were shot in Kashmir and Forest Research Institute, Dehradun. The external view of the school is that of the Kasiga School, Dehradun. The hospital scenes were filmed outside The Lalit, Grand Palace, Srinagar. Parts of the film were also shot in Thailand. Rob Miller, who had previously worked with Shah Rukh Khan on Chak De! India (2007), was hired to direct the sports sequences.

== Marketing and release ==
The film targeted viewers with contest-based marketing.

Tata Motors, the on-ground promotion partner for the film, launched the 'Nano Student of the Year' contest judging students on academics, culture, sports, and social life. The top 8 finalists competed for the 'Nano Student of the Year' title.

The makers partnered with FedEx Express announcing a special 'FedEx Student Offer' and launch of 'FedEx International Student of the Year' campaign. It was aimed at individuals in India applying for higher education abroad.

The satellite rights were sold with Yeh Jawaani Hai Deewani for ₹50 crore (US$5.3 million) to Sony Entertainment Television. The music rights were sold to Sony Music for a sum of ₹7 crore (US$750,000). Late in October 2021, the film's satellite rights, along with those of Agneepath and Yeh Jawaani Hai Deewani were purchased and renewed by Colors Cineplex.

Indiagames also released a mobile video game based on the film.

== Reception ==
=== Critical reception ===
Student of the Year received mixed reviews from critics, with praise directed towards its cast performances and music, but received criticism for its escapist script.

Taran Adarsh of Bollywood Hungama gave 4/5 stars and wrote "Student of the Year is a love story that traverses the trodden path. But KJo is an artisan with intellect and taste and he ensures that the script is spruced up and modernized with such elan that it doesn't offend the spectator's wisdom or intelligence." He added, "This is an escapist cinema at its best! [...] This one's entertainment, entertainment, and entertainment at its best." Komal Nahta also gave 4/5 stars and called it a "supremely-entertaining" film.

Raita Tandon of Filmfare gave 4/5 stars, stating that the "world is surreal and spectacular yet it has moments that will bring you back to reality and warm the cockles of your heart. This is escapism at its best." Rajeev Masand of CNN-IBN gave 3/5 stars and wrote "Nitpickings aside, this is a breezy, enjoyable film by a director who knows his craft." He remarked, "If fun is what you’re seeking, you won't be disappointed."

Anupama Chopra of Hindustan Times gave 3/5 stars and wrote "Karan Johar's forte is excess. He creates fantastical worlds brimming with beautiful people and expensive things and yet anchors them in high emotion. His films work as both designer-porn and soap-opera." She also praised the performance of the cast. Saibal Chatterjee of NDTV gave 2.5/5 stars, commenting that "Student of the Year definitely isn't the film of the year. But if you like your entertainment to be served up with glitzy but pulpy garnishing, pirouette your way to the nearest screen by all means."

Ananya Bhattacharya of Zee News gave 2/5 stars, saying that "Student of the Year is worth a watch only for the debutantes. They have pulled off a tough task of playing praiseworthy roles in a film which suffers from the lack-of-a-story syndrome."

=== Box office ===
Critics were skeptical over the success of the much-hyped film. Additionally, it starred debutantes in the lead roles, and had a high budget. However, the film became the biggest opener, not starring mainstream actors, in Bollywood, and surpassed trade expectations to profit both makers and distributors in the first week itself.

==== India ====
Student of the Year had a good opening collecting ₹7.48 crore (US$800,000) on its opening day. It showed growth on its second day and collected ₹8.50 crore (US$910,000). It had collected ₹43.1 crore (US$4.6 million) by the end of its first week. It had a drop in its second and third week where it had collected ₹14 crore (US$1.5 million) and ₹3.25 crore (US$350,000) respectively to make a total of ₹63.3 crore (US$6.8 million) in three weeks.

==== Overseas ====
Student of the Year collected about US$1.25 million, which Box Office India considered was a poor showing for a release on 300 screens. The film fell in the second week in most markets and closed at around $3 million from overseas markets.

== Soundtrack ==
The soundtrack was composed by Vishal–Shekhar with the lyrics penned by Anvita Dutt Guptan. "The Disco Song" is a revamped cover version of "Disco Deewane" (1981) by Nazia Hassan, incorporating her vocals along with those of Sunidhi Chauhan and Benny Dayal.

== Awards and nominations ==
List of awards and nominations
Ceremony	Category	Recipient	Result
8th Apsara Film & Television Producers Guild Award	President's Honour	Karan Johar	Won
8th Apsara Film & Television Producers Guild Award	Best Actor in a Comic Role	Rishi Kapoor	Nominated
8th Apsara Film & Television Producers Guild Award	Best Male Debut	Sidharth Malhotra	Nominated
8th Apsara Film & Television Producers Guild Award	Best Male Debut	Varun Dhawan	Nominated
8th Apsara Film & Television Producers Guild Award	Best Female Debut	Alia Bhatt	Nominated
8th Apsara Film & Television Producers Guild Award	Best Female Playback Singer	Neeti Mohan (for the song "Ishq Wala Love")	Nominated
8th Apsara Film & Television Producers Guild Award	Best Choreography	Farah Khan (for the song "Radha")	Nominated
58th Filmfare Awards	Best Music Director	Vishal–Shekhar	Nominated
58th Filmfare Awards	Best Debutant – Male	Sidharth Malhotra	Nominated
58th Filmfare Awards	Best Debutant – Male	Varun Dhawan	Nominated
58th Filmfare Awards	Best Debutant – Female	Alia Bhatt	Nominated
58th Filmfare Awards	R. D. Burman Award	Neeti Mohan (for the song "Ishq Wala Love")	Won
5th Mirchi Music Awards	Song of The Year	"Radha"	Nominated
5th Mirchi Music Awards	Album of the Year	Student of the Year	Nominated
5th Mirchi Music Awards	Listener's Choice Album of the Year	Student of the Year	Won
5th Mirchi Music Awards	Listener's Choice Song of the Year	"Radha"	Won
Stardust Awards	Film of The Year	Student of the Year	Nominated
Stardust Awards	Dream Director	Karan Johar	Won
Stardust Awards	Superstar of Tomorrow – Male	Sidharth Malhotra	Nominated
Stardust Awards	Superstar of Tomorrow – Male	Varun Dhawan	Nominated
Stardust Awards	Superstar of Tomorrow – Female	Alia Bhatt	Nominated
Stardust Awards	Best Male Debut	Sidharth Malhotra and Varun Dhawan	Won
Stardust Awards	New Musical Sensation Singer – Female	Neeti Mohan (for the song "Ishq Wala Love")	Nominated
Times of India Film Awards	Best Music Director	Vishal–Shekhar	Nominated
Times of India Film Awards	Best Debut Male	Sidharth Malhotra	Nominated
Times of India Film Awards	Best Debut Male	Varun Dhawan	Nominated
Times of India Film Awards	Best Debut Female	Alia Bhatt	Nominated
