= Jab Tak Hai Jaan =

2012 Indian film by Yash Chopra

- Theatrical release poster
- Directed by: Yash Chopra
- Written by: Aditya Chopra; Devika Bhagat
- Produced by: Aditya Chopra
- Starring: Shah Rukh Khan; Katrina Kaif; Anushka Sharma
- Cinematography: Anil Mehta
- Edited by: Namrata Rao
- Music by: A. R. Rahman
- Production company: Yash Raj Films
- Distributed by: Yash Raj Films
- Release date: 13 November 2012
- Running time: 176 minutes
- Country: India
- Language: Hindi
- Budget: ₹50 crore
- Box office: est. ₹235.66 crore

Jab Tak Hai Jaan (transl. As Long as I Live), abbreviated as JTHJ, is a 2012 Indian Hindi-language romantic drama film written by Aditya Chopra and directed by Yash Chopra. Produced by Yash Raj Films, the film stars Shah Rukh Khan, Katrina Kaif, and Anushka Sharma. The film follows Samar Anand, a bomb disposal expert for the Indian Army whose past as a struggling immigrant in London and romance with Meera Thappar are uncovered when his diary is found by Akira Rai, a Discovery Channel documentary filmmaker.

Jab Tak Hai Jaan marked Chopra's fourth film to feature Khan in the lead role, and the second collaboration between Khan and Sharma, following Rab Ne Bana Di Jodi (2008), which was the debut film of Sharma. The film also marked the first collaboration between Khan and Kaif. Chopra made his return to direction after Veer-Zaara (2004). It was also the posthumous film of Chopra, who died in October 2012, prior to the film's release.

Released during the six-day Diwali weekend beginning on 13 November 2012, Jab Tak Hai Jaan received positive reviews from critics who praised Chopra's direction and the performances of Khan, Kaif, Sharma, but criticised the predictable plot. The film earned ₹235.66 crore (US$25 million) worldwide and emerged as one of the year's top-earning films. It became the 3rd highest-grossing Bollywood film overseas at that time after 3 Idiots (2009) and My Name Is Khan (2010).

At the 58th Filmfare Awards, the film received 7 nominations, including Best Actor (Khan), and won 4 awards, including Best Supporting Actress (Sharma) and Best Lyricist (Gulzar for "Challa").

== Plot ==
Samar Anand, a major in the Indian Army, defuses bombs without fear or regard for his own safety. Akira Rai, a filmmaker for Discovery Channel, later dives into Pangong Lake in Ladakh and is rescued by him. Samar gives her his jacket and leaves before retrieving it. Akira finds his diary in the jacket pocket and begins reading it.

The diary recounts Samar's earlier years as a struggling immigrant in London, where he works as a street musician and takes on other menial jobs to support himself and his roommate, Zain. Samar is working part-time as a waiter when he meets Meera at the engagement party of her and her fiancé, Roger. Meera grew up without a mother in an affluent Punjabi Indian family; her mother left for another man when she was twelve. The dominant figure in her life is her father, for whom she works. Samar notices that Meera often prays whenever he sees her at church. Samar and Meera become friends, but Meera promises God that she will not fall in love with Samar and tells him about the vow. Meera asks Samar to help her speak and sing in Punjabi for her father’s retirement party, and in return, Samar asks her to help him improve his spoken English. As time passes, Samar and Meera begin to fall in love after a night of exuberant street dancing. To help her confront her past, Samar takes Meera to visit her estranged mother, and the two reconcile. A few days later, Meera decides to confess her relationship with Samar to her father and break off her engagement. Samar is then involved in a serious motorcycle accident. Meera makes another vow that, because she broke her previous promise, she will never see Samar again, and prays for his life to be spared. Samar recovers, and Meera admits her vow to him. Angered, he leaves both her and London. Samar challenges God to keep him alive while he risks his life every day, believing that his death is the only way to make Meera lose her faith in God. He returns to India and enlists in the army, becoming a bomb disposal expert.

When Akira finishes reading the diary, she obtains permission to make a documentary about a bomb disposal squad. She asks Samar for help with the film and becomes acquainted with him and his team. Akira develops feelings for Samar; however, he does not reciprocate them because of his unresolved love for Meera. Akira successfully completes the film and leaves for London. She wants Samar to visit the city to help publicise the film; after he reluctantly agrees to travel to London, he is struck by a van.

Samar is diagnosed with retrograde amnesia and remembers only the events before his first accident in London ten years earlier. Concerned, Akira tracks Meera down and persuades her to help with Samar's recovery. Meera agrees, pretending to be Samar's wife. In the meantime, Akira realises that Major Samar is only a fragment of the young Samar; he was once happy and sociable, but has become bitter and lonely. One day, Samar discovers a bomb planted in the London Underground and helps to defuse it. The incident jogs his memory, and he realises that Meera has been lying to him. Samar confronts Meera and gives her a choice: be with him or watch him continue risking his life until he dies. He then leaves for Jammu and Kashmir, where he continues defusing bombs. During a conversation with Akira, Meera reveals that she never married Roger and that she only helps his daughter with events as he is divorced from his wife, realising that her beliefs and prayers condemned Samar to a fate worse than death. She comes to believe that God only wants people to be happy and spread love, and would not take away their loved ones because of a broken promise or bargain. Meera bids farewell to Akira and travels to Kashmir to reunite with Samar. Samar defuses his final bomb and then proposes to her.

== Cast ==
- Shah Rukh Khan as Major Samar Anand, a bomb disposal expert for the Indian Army
- Katrina Kaif as Meera Thappar, a businesswoman who falls in love with Samar
- Anushka Sharma as Akira Rai, a documentary filmmaker for the Discovery Channel
- Sarika as Dr. Zoya Ali Khan, a neurologist and Samar's doctor
- Anupam Kher as Kamal Thappar, Meera's father (special appearance)
- Neetu Kapoor as Pooja Thappar Sharqazi, Meera's mother (special appearance)
- Rishi Kapoor as Imraan Sharqazi, Meera's step-father (special appearance)
- Sharib Hashmi as Zain Mirza, Samar's best friend
- Andrew Bicknell as Frank Zolawalle, Samar's boss
- Jasmine Jardot as Maria, Zain's wife
- Jay Conroy as Roger, Meera's fiancee
- Julia St John as Catherine
- Gireesh Sahdev as Captain Jagdeep Deewan
- Varun Thakur as Lieutenant Hari Krishnan
- Amarinder Sodhi as Captain Kamal Singh
- Manoj Bakshi as Mr. Kapoor

== Production ==
=== Development ===
In June 2011, Yash Raj Films released a statement announcing a new directorial venture by Yash Chopra coinciding with the 50th anniversary of his career. The producers also announced that the film would be released during the Diwali (Note: Diwali is a five-day Hindu festival which falls between mid-October and mid-November.) 2012 weekend. Chopra said the film was untitled at that time, similar to previous project Veer-Zaara (2004) (which was named on the day of its submission to the Central Board of Film Certification). The producers considered a number of titles but were not satisfied with any of them. In September 2012, it was announced that the title of the film was Jab Tak Hai Jaan. It was inspired by a similarly titled song from the 1975 film, Sholay.

Aditya Chopra wanted his father to make another film and approached him with the concept for Jab Tak Hai Jaan. Shah Rukh Khan was their first choice for the role of Samar Anand, due to his long-standing relationship with the production house and the Chopra family, thus making it Chopra's fourth consecutive movie to feature Khan as a lead. Khan, who was working on other projects at that time, was unavailable for the shooting schedule so it was changed. As in his previous productions, Yash wanted to introduce a fresh pairing in JTHJ and chose Katrina Kaif to star with Khan. Anushka Sharma was cast in a supporting role by YRF, with whom she had previously worked on Rab Ne Bana Di Jodi (2008), Badmaash Company, Band Baaja Baaraat (both 2010) and Ladies vs Ricky Bahl (2011). Though casting was quickly completed, shooting was delayed because the lead actors were busy with other projects.

Khan's role spans two ages: one (age 28) as a London-based street musician and the other (ten years later) as an introverted, composed and dutiful army officer in Jammu and Kashmir. In an interview, Khan revealed details about his character: "[Samar] is angry, unforgiving, with loads of emotional baggage. I play him sweet when he needs to be. Actually, he is a lot like I am. Samar is a combination of angst, tenderness, anger, and yeah, he's pretty unforgiving."

Kaif's role was described as "the archetypal Yash Chopra seductress, an unattainable beauty".

Sharma's character, Akira, was described as a "21-year-old who works for the Discovery Channel and makes documentaries. She is on a quest to discover the truth behind the story of The Man Who Cannot Die (Samar Anand) in the film. She is extremely ambitious and will do anything to make it big and realize her dreams."

=== Filming ===
The film's principal photography was expected to begin in November 2011, but was delayed because Khan wanted to take a break after his two previous films, Ra.One and Don 2 (both 2011). Principal photography began on 9 January 2012 at Yash Raj Studios in Mumbai, where a significant part of movie was shot.

After filming in India, the crew began a 35-day shooting schedule in London on 22 February 2012. It was shot under the working title Production 45. Khan arrived in London on 21 February 2012, and finished filming on 26 March 2012. During the filming, photos of the actors on-set were leaked on the Internet, triggering a camera ban by the producers and increased security. A number of locations throughout the city featured in JTHJ, including the Borough Market, Jubilee Walkway, the Great Conservatory, the Palace of Westminster, Westminster Bridge, Trafalgar Square, the Hungerford Bridge and Golden Jubilee Bridges, the O2 Arena, the Tower Bridge, and Canary Wharf. A dance sequence was filmed next to King's College London law school in Somerset House. A car-crash scene was filmed at Shepherd's Bush by closing four streets in the area. Filming was completed on 27 March 2012 at an indoor location in East London.

The romantic scenes were directed by Chopra's son, Aditya, to give them a more contemporary feel. The "Ishq Shava" dance scene was shot with the leading duo and freestyle dancers in an underground club and aboard a boat on the River Thames. The film's climax, initially planned by Chopra to be shot in the mountains of Jammu and Kashmir, was moved to Ladakh. This was reportedly suggested by Khan, whose Dil Se.. (1998) was shot in the area many years earlier. Portions of Jab Tak Hai Jaan were filmed in three Kashmiri cities: Srinagar, Pahalgam, and Gulmarg.

Yash wanted to add scenes from the Swiss Alps to the title song; however, the scheduled shoot was cancelled after his death. Aditya wanted to keep the film as it was because he felt that doing otherwise would "tamper" with his father's vision.

== Music ==
The music for the film was composed by A. R. Rahman, marking his first collaboration with Yash Chopra. He signed to compose the soundtrack in May 2011. The first song of the soundtrack was completed in December 2011. By February 2012, Rahman said in an interview with The Times of India that he had completed three songs for the film. He summarized the soundtrack album: "It's a combination. They wanted to do my kind of songs at the same time they wanted the old charm and soul of music that Indian audience would love and which I wanted to do for a long time." The soundtrack features nine songs, with eight lyrics by Gulzar and the title track written by Aditya. It was released by YRF Music on 10 October 2012. JTHJ's music proved to be popular with the songs "Ishq Shava", "Saans", "Heer" and "Jiya Re" becoming the most popular songs of the soundtrack.

== Release ==
=== Legal issues ===
Two weeks before Jab Tak Hai Jaan's release, Ajay Devgn FFilms sent a notice to the Competition Commission of India accusing Yash Raj Films of monopolistic business practices; the notice contended that they used "their dominant position in the Bollywood film market" to secure many desirable single-screen theatres for their release. Yash Raj Films responded by saying that they were "shocked" and questioned Devgn's "motives". The studio denied Devgn's claim that high-quality single-screens were unavailable, pointing out that they had only booked 1,500 single-screens for Jab Tak Hai Jaan out of the 10,500 available in India. After the rebuttal by Yash Raj Films, Devgn said he only managed to book 600 single-screens for Son of Sardaar (2012) and would take legal action if not allotted more. He accused Yash Raj Films of signing tie-in agreements for Ek Tha Tiger with exhibitors, requiring them to show Jab Tak Hai Jaan on Diwali and keep it in cinemas for at least two weeks thereafter.

A week before the release of Jab Tak Hai Jaan and Son of Sardaar, the commission dismissed Devgn's claim. In an interview a commission spokesperson said: "We considered the plea application. We have not found any merit in the case as there is no case of abuse of dominant position. There is no violation." After his notice was rejected, Devgn appealed the decision; the Appellate Tribunal refused Devgn's request to nullify agreements made with single-screen exhibitors for the release of Jab Tak Hai Jaan, but agreed to reexamine the case to determine if Yash Raj Films had engaged in monopolistic practices. Both films were released on 13 November 2012 in the number of single-screens originally contracted.

=== Theatrical release ===
Jab Tak Hai Jaan was released on 600 screens in overseas markets; the estimated number of release screens in India was about 2,500. Yash Raj Films distributed the film to 1,000 multiplexes and 1,500 single-screen cinemas. It was selected for the Doha Tribeca Film Festival and the Marrakech International Film Festival. It was chosen to "honour the legacy" of Yash Chopra, since it was his last project.

=== Home media ===
Yash Raj Films launched Jab Tak Hai Jaan in VCD, DVD and region-free high-definition Blu-ray Disc formats on 3 January 2013. The Blu-ray Disc edition featured Dolby TrueHD 96k upsampling, DTS-HD Master Audio 5.1, Dolby Surround 5.1 sound and two additional DVDs. Four hours of extra footage were included on the discs, including the making of the film and songs, an interview with Chopra and Khan, deleted scenes, videos of Khan learning to play the guitar and ride a bicycle, and a preview from the film's premiere held in a specially constructed vintage theatre at Yash Raj Studios. The film was made available on Amazon Prime Video.

== Reception ==
=== Critical response ===
==== India ====
Jab Tak Hai Jaan received positive reviews from critics. Taran Adarsh of Bollywood Hungama gave the film 4 (out of 5) stars, saying that it was "attention-grabbing from inception till conclusion. The drama only soars higher and the complex love story gets more and more gripping as the conflict between the characters come to the fore." Rachit Gupta of Filmfare gave it 4 (out of 5) stars: "At a gracious 3 hours runtime, JTHJ feels like an epic love story. And it is just that. JTHJ is the perfect adieu to a hallmark career. It is the best romantic film made in this generation." Saibal Chatterjee of NDTV gave it 3.5 (out of 5) stars: "Despite the lovey-dovey nothingness that drives the plot, Jab Tak Hai Jaan has more substance than most romantic films that come out of Bollywood." Meena Iyer of The Times of India rated it 3.5 (out of 5) stars, saying: "Every frame is picture-perfect, the emotions are well nuanced. But there is one inherent flaw – the story by Aditya Chopra is hackneyed." Subhash Jha (also from The Times of India) said, "Jab Tak Hai Jaan makes you fall in love with love all over again." Anupama Chopra of the Hindustan Times gave the film 3 (out of 5) stars: "Jab Tak Hai Jaan is too tangled to transport you. But I recommend that you see it. Because only Yash Chopra could make heartache so attractive and ennobling that his characters wear it like a badge of honor."

Rajeev Masand of CNN-IBN gave it 3 (out of 5) stars: "I'm going with three out of five for the late Yash Chopra's Jab Tak Hai Jaan. Despite its many script problems, it's a consistently watchable film that oozes with feeling and real emotion. A fitting swan song!" OPEN magazine gave the film 3 (out of 5) stars, praising Yash Chopra's direction. Ajit Duara called it "a deeply-felt cinematic perspective from 80 years of living." Raja Sen of Rediff.com gave it 3 (out of 5) stars, saying: "As a swan-song for the master director, Jab Tak Hai Jaan might only be a middling effort. But then, sometimes, all we need is a Khan-song." Shabana Ansari of Daily News and Analysis gave the film 3 (out of 5) stars: "If you must, watch Jab Tak Hai Jaan for Khan, who can still convey love and passion in a fleeting look or a dimpled smile; and for Yash Chopra who gave us some of the most enduring romances of all times."

Some reviews were more polarized. Shubhra Gupta of The Indian Express gave the film 2.5 (out of 5) stars, saying "watch this one for Khan, who can still do the dimpled boy wonder and the older, mature lover with a wry smile and wounded wink and sexy nudge." Sukanya Verma (also from Rediff.com) described it as an "elegant, harmless entertainer for [the] most part", praising the visuals, acting and music. She criticised the screenplay, contending that the film could have been "snappier", and gave it 2.5 (out of 5) stars. Piyasree Dasgupta of First Post wrote: "You have seen everything Jab Tak Hai Jaan has many times before, just in other films. And probably with far better music than A. R. Rahman threw into this one."

==== Overseas ====
Jab Tak Hai Jaan received mixed reviews from critics overseas. Priya Joshi of the website Digital Spy gave it 3 (out of 5) stars: "The film is invested with a healthy dose of Khan, the very heart and saans of Yash Chopra, and the message which he lived and breathed through his films: that love is eternal." Simon Foster of Australia's Special Broadcasting Service also gave it 3 (out of 5) stars, calling it "a grand cinematic work boasting all the pros and cons of the genre." He observed: "Yash Chopra fans will not hear complaints that the great producer-director had become mired in a rut, or that his films are rote melodramas reliant on boisterous music (here, a typically string-heavy work from the omnipresent A. R. Rahman) and over-active camerawork. One could argue that it's their very vivid cinematic nature that makes them particularly noteworthy, even when the dialogue (at times, awful) and plotting (rarely based in logical realism) can test one's patience." Mark Olsen of the Los Angeles Times wrote: "The film has a freshness that would never lead one to think it was directed by an 80-year-old while at the same time it has a sureness of tone, a certainty about itself even at its most audacious, that only comes from the hand of a seasoned master... Jab Tak Hai Jaan serves as a fitting tribute to the career of Yash Chopra."

Lisa Tsering of The Hollywood Reporter wrote: "Director-producer Yash Chopra's film, his final project before he died, delivers not only the romance and human touch, but also reflects a modern sensibility." Nicolas Rapold of The New York Times wrote, "Even though the film drags, the magic of Bollywood is that this story's muddle of twists only clarifies the urgency behind the undying desires of all concerned parties." Mazhar Farooqui of Dubai's the Gulf News wrote: "Despite its inherent flaws, JTHJ comes across as a beguiling romantic film that takes you on a roller coaster ride of high emotions set amidst picture postcard locales but more than anyone the movie belongs to Yash Chopra. In his swan song, the celebrated director once again proved why his legacy will be hard to match."

=== Box office ===
The film's color-coded distribution map.

Jab Tak Hai Jaan grossed ₹2.36 billion (US$25 million) worldwide.

==== Domestic ====
Jab Tak Hai Jaan had 95-100% occupancy at multiplexes and single screens across India on its opening day. It earned about ₹125.0 million (US$1.3 million) on its first day. Jab Tak Hai Jaan showed 50-percent growth and earned ₹195.4 million (US$2.1 million) on its second day, netting ₹448.4 million (US$4.8 million) during its first three days. The film earned ₹736.8 million (US$7.9 million) over its long six-day weekend.

Earnings dropped the following Monday to ₹48.1 million (US$510,000), bringing the total to ₹780 million (US$8.3 million) for its first week of release. The film continued to do well at the box office after its first week, netting ₹822.4 million (US$8.8 million) in ten days. It faltered during its second week (netting only ₹157.9 million (US$1.7 million)), and crossed the ₹1 billion (US$11 million) mark 20 days after release. After three weeks, Jab Tak Hai Jaan earned ₹1.02 billion (US$11 million). (Note: While Box Office India stated that the film netted about ₹1.02 billion (US$11 million), trade analysts Taran Adarsh and Komal Nahta claimed it reached an 8-percent higher figure (about ₹1.20 billion (US$13 million)) during the same period. Nevertheless, Box Office India's figures are used here.) The distributor share was ₹570 million (US$6.1 million), and Box Office India declared it a hit in India.

==== Overseas ====
Jab Tak Hai Jaan earned US$1.3 million on its first day and $3.50 million at the end of three days in overseas markets. After the first weekend, the film earned $7.58 million in six days. Jab Tak Hai Jaan grossed about $11 million overseas in thirteen days before the number of screens decreased. At the end of its theatrical run, it is estimated to have earned US$12.5 million.

==== Records ====
At the time of release, Jab Tak Hai Jaan set records for the highest opening-day earnings in Singapore and Pakistan by grossing $100,000. Jab Tak Hai Jaan became the highest-grossing Bollywood film in Bahrain and the Middle East, earning more than $4 million. It was the highest-grossing Bollywood film overseas for 2012, and the third-highest-grossing Bollywood film that year, after Ek Tha Tiger and Dabangg 2.

== Accolades ==
The film won four Filmfare Awards, five Zee Cine Awards and two Colors Screen Awards. Jab Tak Hai Jaan received several marketing and business awards for its overseas performance, promotions, distribution, and music. However, Kaif and Sharma were nominated for Golden Kela and Ghanta awards; some critics felt that their acting was less than stellar. Sharma and Shreya Ghoshal were the main award recipients.

List of accolades received by Jab Tak Hai Jaan
Distributor	Date announced	Category	Recipient	Result	Ref(s)
BIG Star Entertainment Awards	17 December 2012	Most Entertaining Actor – Male	Shah Rukh Khan	Won	
BIG Star Entertainment Awards	17 December 2012	Most Romantic Actor – Female	Katrina Kaif	Won	
BIG Star Entertainment Awards	17 December 2012	Most Entertaining Couple	Shah Rukh Khan and Katrina Kaif	Won	
BIG Star Entertainment Awards	17 December 2012	Most Entertaining Singer – Female	Shreya Ghoshal for "Saans"	Won	
BIG Star Entertainment Awards	17 December 2012	Most Romantic Film	Yash Chopra	Nominated	
BIG Star Entertainment Awards	17 December 2012	Most Entertaining Actor – Female	Anushka Sharma	Nominated	
BIG Star Entertainment Awards	17 December 2012	Most Romantic Actor – Male	Shah Rukh Khan	Nominated	
BIG Star Entertainment Awards	17 December 2012	Most Romantic Actor – Female	Anushka Sharma	Nominated	
Colors Screen Awards	12 January 2013	Best Popular Actor – Female	Katrina Kaif	Won	
Colors Screen Awards	12 January 2013	Lifetime Achievement Award	Yash Chopra for all his films	Won	
Colors Screen Awards	12 January 2013	Best Actor – Male	Shah Rukh Khan	Nominated	
Colors Screen Awards	12 January 2013	Best Supporting Actor – Female	Anushka Sharma	Nominated	
Colors Screen Awards	12 January 2013	Best Popular Actor – Male	Shah Rukh Khan	Nominated	
Colors Screen Awards	12 January 2013	Best Popular Actor – Female	Anushka Sharma	Nominated	
Colors Screen Awards	12 January 2013	Best Playback Singer – Female	Neeti Mohan for "Jiya Re"	Nominated	
Colors Screen Awards	12 January 2013	Best Lyrics	Gulzar for "Saans"	Nominated	
Colors Screen Awards	12 January 2013	Best Choreography	Vaibhavi Merchant for "Ishq Shava"	Nominated	
Colors Screen Awards	12 January 2013	Best Cinematography	Anil Mehta	Nominated	
ETC Bollywood Business Awards	4 January 2013	Most Profitable Actor – Overseas	Shah Rukh Khan	Won	
ETC Bollywood Business Awards	4 January 2013	Most Profitable Actor – Female	Katrina Kaif	Won	
ETC Bollywood Business Awards	4 January 2013	Most Successful Producer	Aditya Chopra	Won	
ETC Bollywood Business Awards	4 January 2013	Most Successful Banner	Yash Raj Films	Won	
ETC Bollywood Business Awards	4 January 2013	Most Popular Trailer	Jab Tak Hai Jaan	Won	
Filmfare Awards	20 January 2013	Best Supporting Actress	Anushka Sharma	Won	
Filmfare Awards	20 January 2013	Best Lyricist	Gulzar for "Challa"	Won	
Filmfare Awards	20 January 2013	Lifetime Achievement Award	Yash Chopra (for all his films)	Won	
Filmfare Awards	20 January 2013	R. D. Burman Award	Neeti Mohan for "Jiya Re"	Won	
Filmfare Awards	20 January 2013	Best Actor	Shah Rukh Khan	Nominated	
Filmfare Awards	20 January 2013	Best Lyricist	Gulzar for "Saans"	Nominated	
Filmfare Awards	20 January 2013	Best Male Playback Singer	Rabbi Shergill for "Challa"	Nominated	
Filmfare Awards	20 January 2013	Best Female Playback Singer	Neeti Mohan for "Jiya Re"	Nominated	
Filmfare Awards	20 January 2013	Best Female Playback Singer	Shreya Ghoshal for "Saans"	Nominated	
IIFA Awards	6 July 2013	Best Supporting Actor – Female	Anushka Sharma	Won	
IIFA Awards	6 July 2013	IIFA Forever Director	Yash Chopra	Won	
IIFA Awards	6 July 2013	Digital Star of the Year	Shah Rukh Khan	Won	
IIFA Awards	6 July 2013	Best Actor – Male	Shah Rukh Khan	Nominated	
IIFA Awards	6 July 2013	Best Music Director	A. R. Rahman	Nominated	
IIFA Awards	6 July 2013	Best Lyrics	Gulzar for "Saans"	Nominated	
Lions Gold Awards	18 January 2013	Favorite Actor	Shah Rukh Khan	Won	
Mirchi Music Awards	7 February 2013	Upcoming Female Vocalist of The Year	Neeti Mohan for "Jiya Re"	Won	
Mirchi Music Awards	7 February 2013	Male Vocalist of The Year	Rabbi Shergill for "Challa"	Nominated	
Mirchi Music Awards	7 February 2013	Female Vocalist of The Year	Shreya Ghoshal for "Saans"	Nominated	
Mirchi Music Awards	7 February 2013	Lyricist of The Year	Gulzar for "Saans"	Nominated	
Mirchi Music Awards	7 February 2013	Song representing Sufi tradition	"Challa"	Nominated	
Mirchi Music Awards	7 February 2013	Song Recording/Sound Engineering of the Year	R Nitish Kumar, Shantanu Hudlikar & TR Krishna Chetan for "Challa"	Nominated	
Mirchi Music Awards	7 February 2013	Background Score of the Year	A. R. Rahman	Nominated	
Stardust Awards	26 January 2013	Best Actor Editors' Choice – Male	Shah Rukh Khan	Won	
Stardust Awards	26 January 2013	Star of the Year – Male	Shah Rukh Khan	Won	
Stardust Awards	26 January 2013	Best Actress – Comedy/Romance	Anushka Sharma	Won	
Stardust Awards	26 January 2013	Star of the Year – Female	Katrina Kaif	Nominated	
Stardust Awards	26 January 2013	Best Actor – Comedy/Romance	Shah Rukh Khan	Nominated	
Stardust Awards	26 January 2013	Best Actress – Comedy/Romance	Katrina Kaif	Nominated	
Star Guild Awards	16 February 2013	Best Lyrics	Gulzar for "Saans"	Won	
Star Guild Awards	16 February 2013	Best Actor – Male	Shah Rukh Khan	Nominated	
Star Guild Awards	16 February 2013	Best Actress – Supporting Role	Anushka Sharma	Nominated	
Star Guild Awards	16 February 2013	Best Music	A. R. Rahman	Nominated	
Star Guild Awards	16 February 2013	Best Female Playback Singer	Shreya Ghoshal for "Saans"	Nominated	
Star Guild Awards	16 February 2013	Best Choreography	Vaibhavi Merchant for "Ishq Shava"	Nominated	
Times of India Film Awards	6 April 2013	Best Lyrics	Gulzar for "Saans"	Won	
Times of India Film Awards	6 April 2013	Best Actor – Male	Shah Rukh Khan	Nominated	
Times of India Film Awards	6 April 2013	Best Actress in a Supporting Role	Anushka Sharma	Nominated	
Zee Cine Awards	7 January 2013	International Film Icon – Male	Shah Rukh Khan	Won	
Zee Cine Awards	7 January 2013	International Film Icon – Female	Katrina Kaif	Won	
Zee Cine Awards	7 January 2013	Best Supporting Actor – Female	Anushka Sharma	Won	
Zee Cine Awards	7 January 2013	Best Playback Singer – Female	Shreya Ghoshal for "Saans"	Won	
Zee Cine Awards	7 January 2013	Power Club Box Office Award	Yash Chopra	Won	
Zee Cine Awards	7 January 2013	Best Actor – Male	Shah Rukh Khan	Nominated	
Zee Cine Awards	7 January 2013	Best Music	A. R. Rahman	Nominated	
Zee Cine Awards	7 January 2013	Best Playback Singer – Male	Rabbi Shergill for "Challa"	Nominated	
Zee Cine Awards	7 January 2013	Best Playback Singer – Female	Neeti Mohan for "Jiya Re"	Nominated	
Zee Cine Awards	7 January 2013	Best Lyrics	Gulzar for "Saans"	Nominated	
Zee Cine Awards	7 January 2013	Best Dialogues	Aditya Chopra	Nominated	

== See also ==
- Insurgency in Jammu and Kashmir, depicted in the film
