= 58th Filmfare Awards =

2013 awards for Hindi cinema

- Date: 20 January 2013
- Site: Yash Raj Studio, Mumbai
- Hosted by: Shahrukh Khan; Saif Ali Khan; Karan Johar
- Produced by: The Times Group
- Official website: www.filmfare.com

Highlights
- Best Film: Barfi!
- Critics Award for Best Film: Gangs of Wasseypur
- Most awards: Barfi! (7)
- Most nominations: Barfi! (12)

Television coverage
- Network: Sony Entertainment Television (India)

The 58th Filmfare Awards were held honoring the best films of 2012 from the Hindi-language film industry (commonly known as Bollywood). The nominations were announced on 13 January 2013. The ceremony was held on 20 January 2013 at Yash Raj Studio, Mumbai. The event was hosted by Shah Rukh Khan and Saif Ali Khan for the sixth time. All the Filmfare Black Lady statuettes had gold-plated bottoms to celebrate 100 years of Indian Cinema. The Lifetime Achievement Award was awarded posthumously to Yash Chopra (collected by his wife, Pamela Chopra).

Barfi! led the ceremony with 12 nominations, followed by Vicky Donor with 8 nominations and Jab Tak Hai Jaan with 7 nominations.

Barfi! won 7 awards, including Best Film, Best Actor (for Ranbir Kapoor), Best Female Debut (for Ileana D'Cruz) and Best Music Director (for Pritam), thus becoming the most-awarded film at the ceremony.

Cousins Parineeti Chopra and Priyanka Chopra were nominated for Best Actress for their performances in Ishaqzaade and Barfi! respectively, but both lost to Vidya Balan who won the award for Kahaani.

For a second consecutive year, both Ranbir Kapoor and Vidya Balan won Best Actor and Best Actress respectively, this time for their performances in Barfi! and Kahaani.

== Winners and nominees ==
The nominees for the 58th Filmfare Awards were announced on 13 January 2013.

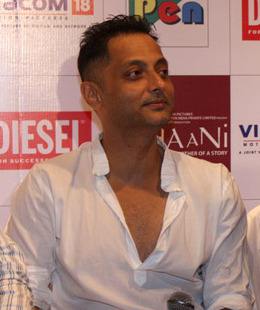
Sujoy Ghosh, Best Director

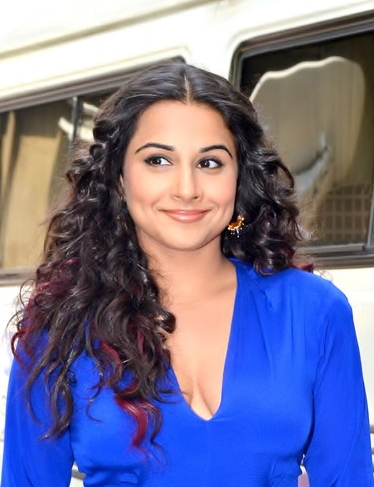
Vidya Balan, Best Actress

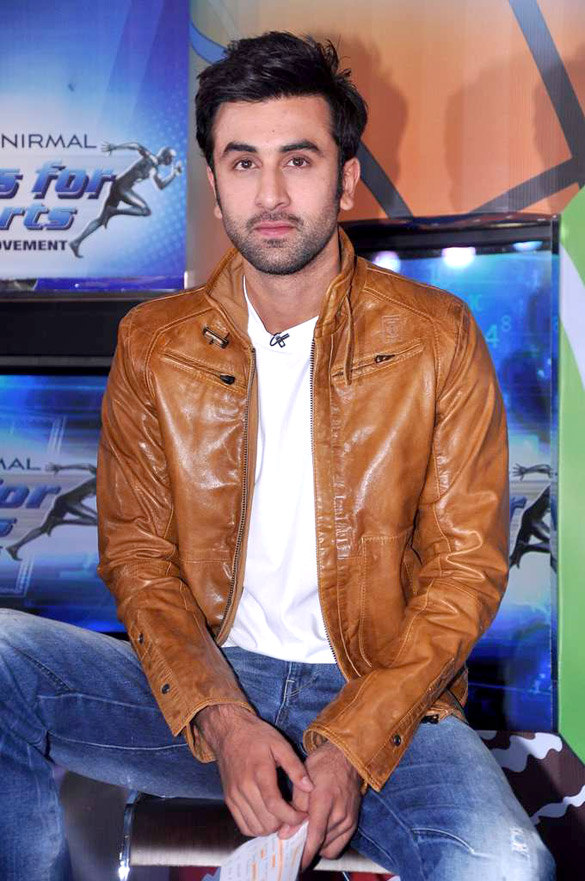
Ranbir Kapoor, Best Actor

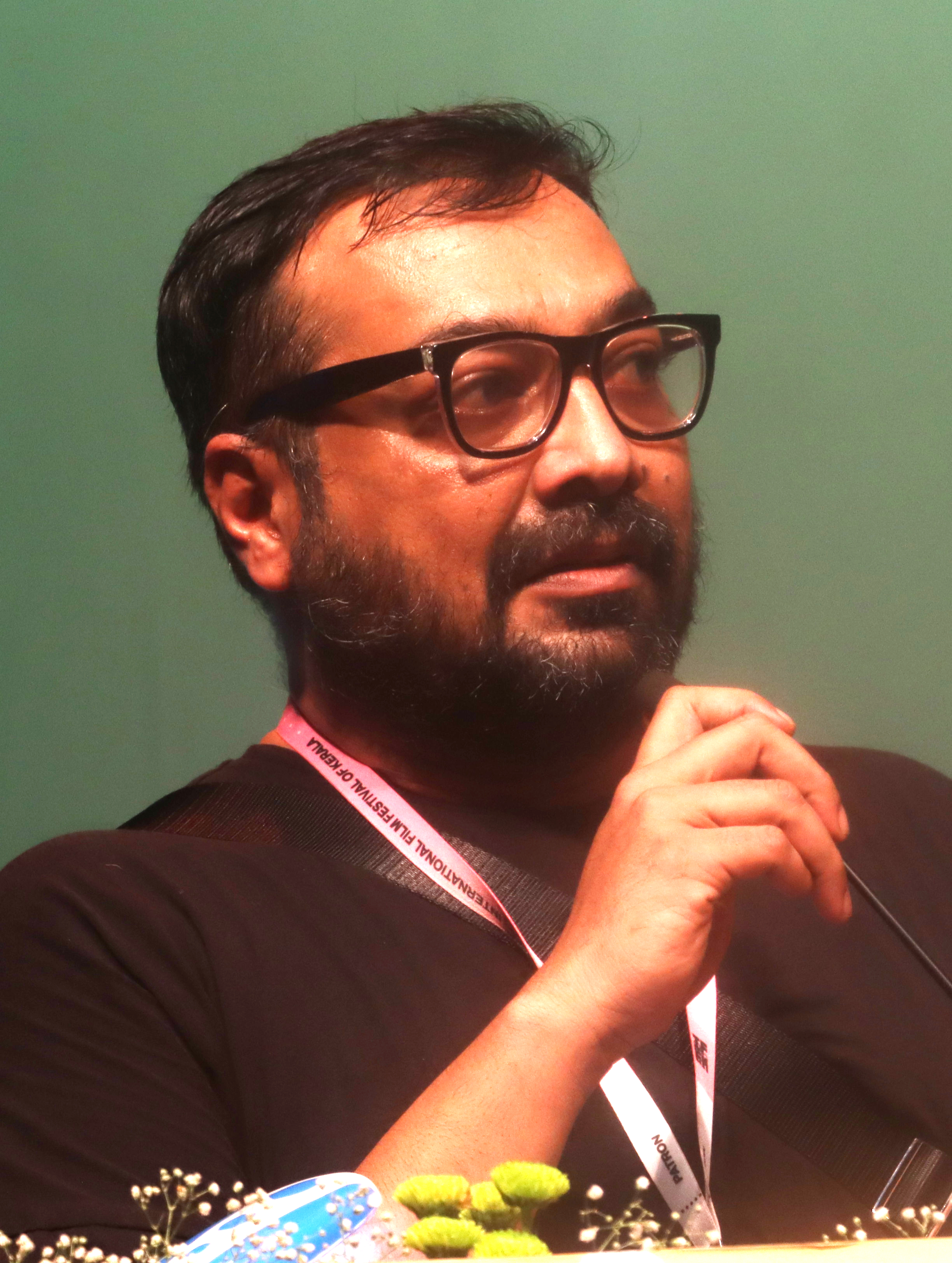
Anurag Kashyap, Best Director Critics

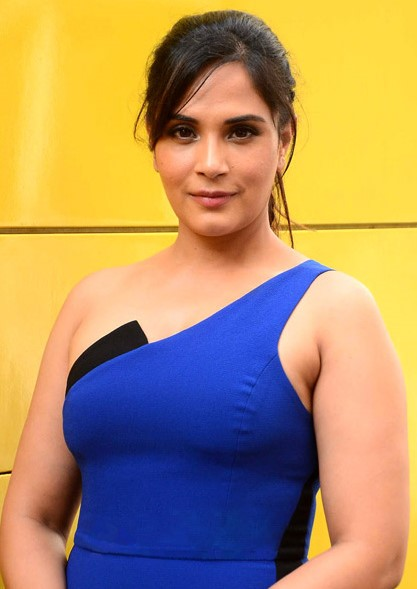
Richa Chadda, Best Actress Critics

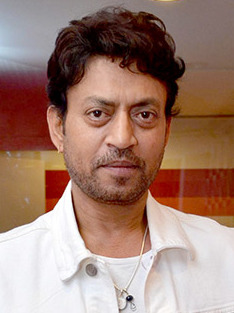
Irrfan Khan, Best Actor Critics

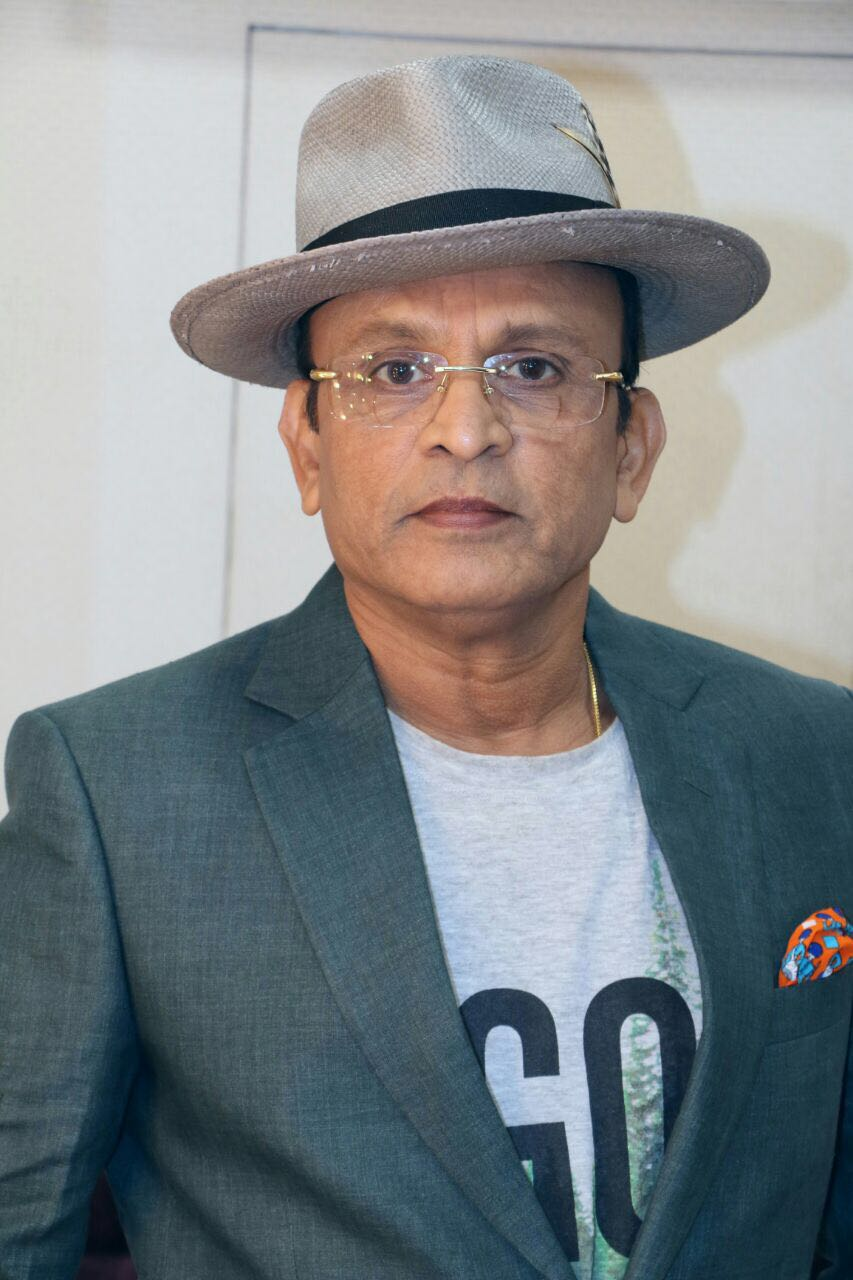
Annu Kapoor, Best Supporting Actor

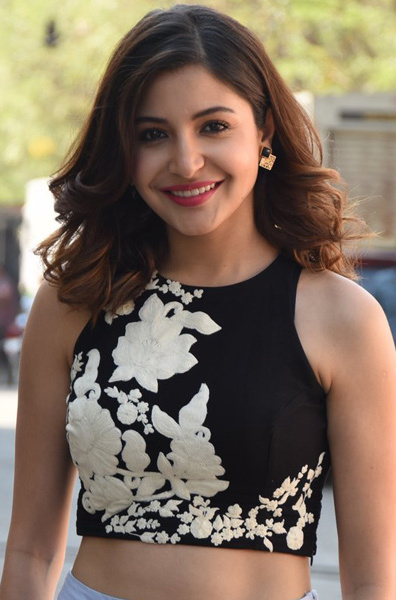
Anushka Sharma, Best Supporting Actress

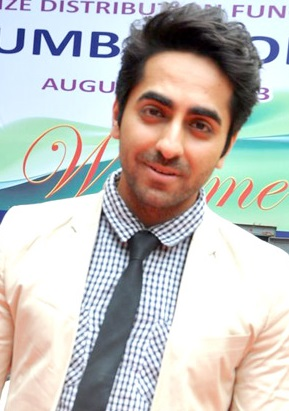
Ayushmann Khurrana, Best Male Playback Singer

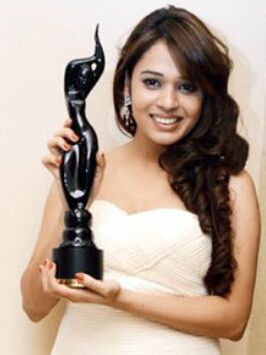
Shalmali Kholgade, Best Female Playback Singer

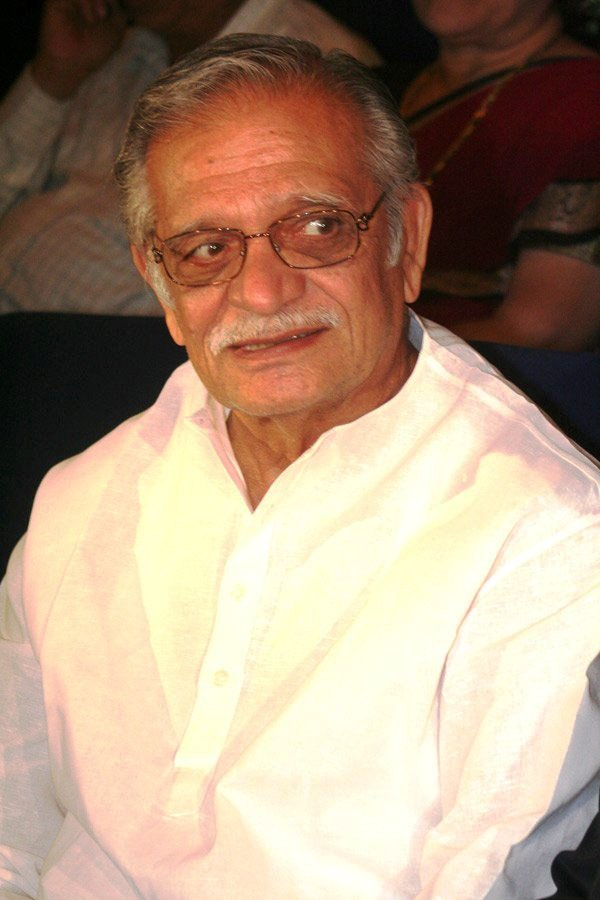
Gulzar, Best Lyricist

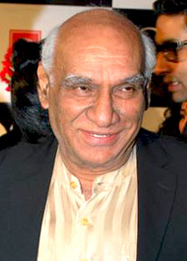
Yash Chopra, Lifetime Achievement Awardee

Best Film	Best Director
Barfi! – Ronnie Screwvala and Siddharth Roy Kapur; English Vinglish – Sunil Lulla, R. Balki, and Rakesh Jhunjhunwala; Gangs of Wasseypur – Anurag Kashyap and Sunil Bohra; Kahaani – Sujoy Ghosh and Kushal Kantilal Gada; Vicky Donor – Shoojit Sircar	Sujoy Ghosh – Kahaani; Anurag Basu – Barfi!; Anurag Kashyap – Gangs of Wasseypur; Gauri Shinde – English Vinglish; Shoojit Sircar – Vicky Donor
Best Actor	Best Actress
Ranbir Kapoor – Barfi! as Murphy "Barfi" Johnson; Hrithik Roshan – Agneepath as Vijay Deenanath Chauhan; Irrfan Khan – Paan Singh Tomar as Paan Singh Tomar; Manoj Bajpai – Gangs of Wasseypur as Sardar Khan; Salman Khan – Dabangg 2 as Chulbul Pandey; Shah Rukh Khan – Jab Tak Hai Jaan as Samar Anand	Vidya Balan – Kahaani as Vidya Bagchi; Deepika Padukone – Cocktail as Veronica Malaney; Kareena Kapoor – Heroine as Mahi Arora; Parineeti Chopra – Ishaqzaade as Zoya Qureshi; Priyanka Chopra – Barfi! as Jhilmil Chatterjee; Sridevi – English Vinglish as Shashi Godbole
Best Supporting Actor	Best Supporting Actress
Annu Kapoor – Vicky Donor as Dr. Chaddha; Akshay Kumar – OMG: Oh My God! as Krishna Vasudev Yadav / Lord Krishna; Emraan Hashmi – Shanghai as Joginder Parmar; Nawazuddin Siddiqui – Talaash: The Answer Lies Within as Taimoor; Rishi Kapoor – Agneepath as Rauf Lala	Anushka Sharma – Jab Tak Hai Jaan as Akira Rai; Dolly Ahluwalia – Vicky Donor as Dolly Arora; Huma Qureshi – Gangs Of Wasseypur as Mohsina; Ileana D'Cruz – Barfi! as Shruti Ghosh; Rani Mukerji – Talaash: The Answer Lies Within as Roshni; Richa Chadda – Gangs Of Wasseypur as Nagma Khatoon
Best Male Debut	Best Female Debut
Ayushmann Khurana – Vicky Donor as Vicky Arora; Arjun Kapoor – Ishaqzaade as Parma Chauhan; Sidharth Malhotra – Student Of The Year as Abhimanyu Singh; Varun Dhawan – Student Of The Year as Rohan Nanda	Ileana D'Cruz – Barfi! as Shruti Ghosh; Alia Bhatt – Student Of The Year as Shanaya Singhania; Diana Penty – Cocktail as Meera Sahni; Huma Qureshi – Gangs Of Wasseypur as Mohsina; Huma Qureshi – Luv Shuv Tey Chicken Khurana as Harman; Yami Gautam – Vicky Donor as Ashima Roy
Best Music Director	Best Lyricist
Pritam – Barfi!; Amit Trivedi – Ishaqzaade; Pritam – Cocktail; Sneha Khanwalkar – Gangs Of Wasseypur; Vishal–Shekhar – Student Of The Year	Gulzar – "Challa" – Jab Tak Hai Jaan; Amitabh Bhattacharya – "Abhi Mujh Mein Kahin" – Agneepath; Gulzar – "Saans" – Jab Tak Hai Jaan; Javed Akhtar – "Jee Le Zara" – Talaash: The Answer Lies Within; Swanand Kirkire – "Aashiyan" – Barfi!
Best Playback Singer – Male	Best Playback Singer – Female
Ayushmann Khurrana – "Pani Da Rang" – Vicky Donor; Mohit Chauhan – "Barfi!" – Barfi!; Nikhil Paul George – "Main Kya Karoon" – Barfi!; Rabbi Shergill – "Challa" – Jab Tak Hai Jaan; Sonu Nigam – "Abhi Mujh Mein Kahin" – Agneepath	Shalmali Kholgade – "Pareshaan" – Ishaqzaade; Kavita Seth – "Tumhi Ho Bandhu" – Cocktail; Neeti Mohan – "Jiya Re" – Jab Tak Hai Jaan; Shreya Ghoshal – "Chikni Chameli" – Agneepath; Shreya Ghoshal – "Saans" – Jab Tak Hai Jaan

=== Critics' awards ===
Best Film (Best Director)
Gangs of Wasseypur (Anurag Kashyap)
Best Actor	Best Actress
Irrfan Khan – Paan Singh Tomar	Richa Chadda – Gangs of Wasseypur

=== Technical awards ===
Best Story	Best Screenplay
Juhi Chaturvedi – Vicky Donor	Sanjay Chauhan and Tigmanshu Dhulia – Paan Singh Tomar
Best Dialogue	Best Editing
Anurag Kashyap, Zeishan Quadri, Akhilesh & Sachin Ladia – Gangs of Wasseypur	Namrata Rao – Kahaani
Best Choreography	Best Cinematography
Bosco-Caesar – "Aunty Ji" from Ek Main Aur Ekk Tu	Satyajit Pande (Setu) – Kahaani
Best Production Design	Best Sound Design
Rajat Podar – Barfi!	Sanjay Maurya and Allwin Rego – Kahaani
Best Costume Design	Best Background Score
Manoshi Nath and Rushi Sharma – Shanghai	Pritam – Barfi!
Best Special Effects	Best Action
Ek tha Tiger	Sham Kaushal – Gangs of Wasseypur

Special Award (for Mr. India & Nagina)
- Sridevi
Lifetime Achievement
- Yash Chopra
Sony Trendsetter of the Year
- Barfi!
RD Burman Award
- Neeti Mohan
Best Debut Director
- Gauri Shinde – English Vinglish

== Multiple nominations ==
The following films received multiple nominations.

- 12 nominations: Barfi!
- 8 nominations: Vicky Donor
- 7 nominations: Jab Tak Hai Jaan
- 6 nominations: Gangs of Wasseypur, Kahaani
- 5 nominations: Agneepath
- 4 nominations: Cocktail, Student Of The Year
- 3 nominations: English Vinglish, Ishaqzaade and Talaash: The Answer Lies Within
- 2 nominations: Paan Singh Tomar and Shanghai

The following films received multiple awards.

- 7 wins: Barfi!
- 5 wins: Kahaani
- 4 wins: Gangs of Wasseypur and Vicky Donor
- 2 wins: Jab Tak Hai Jaan and Paan Singh Tomar

== Achievements ==
- Sneha Khanwalkar became the second woman ever to be nominated for Best Music Director. Usha Khanna was the first woman to achieve this feat at the 31st Filmfare Awards in 1984.

== See also ==
- Filmfare Awards
