= 5th Mirchi Music Awards =

Indian film music awards in 2013

- Sponsored by: Royal Stag
- Date: February 7, 2013
- Country: India
- Presented by: Radio Mirchi
- Hosted by: Ayushmann Khurana and Meiyang Chang

Highlights
- Most awards: Agneepath (7)
- Most nominations: Agneepath (15)
- Song of the Year: "Abhi Mujh Mein Kahin" - Agneepath
- Album of the Year: Agneepath
- Website: Music Mirchi Awards 2012

Television/radio coverage
- Network: Colors

The 5th Mirchi Music Awards, presented by the Radio Mirchi, honoured the best of Hindi music from the year 2012. The ceremony was held on 7 February 2013 and was hosted by Ayushmann Khurana and Meiyang Chang. Agneepath won a leading seven awards including Album of the Year and Song of the Year for "Abhi Mujh Mein Kahin". The show was broadcast on 3 March 2013 on Colors.

== Winners and nominees ==
The nominations were decided on 15 January 2013. The winners were selected by the members of jury, chaired by Javed Akhtar. The following are the names of nominees and winners.

(Winners are listed first, highlighted in boldface.)

=== Film awards ===
Song of the Year	Album of the Year
**"Abhi Mujh Mein Kahin"** - **Agneepath**; "Tum Hi Ho Bandhu" - Cocktail; "Dagabaaz Re" - Dabangg 2; "Radha" - Student of the Year; "Pani Da Rang (Male)" - Vicky Donor	**"Agneepath"** - **Ajay–Atul, Amitabh Bhattacharya**; "Barfi!" - Pritam, Ashish Pandit, Sayeed Quadri, Swanand Kirkire, Neelesh Misra, Amitabh Bhattacharya; "Cocktail" - Pritam, Irshad Kamil, Amitabh Bhattacharya; "Ishaqzaade" - Amit Trivedi, Kausar Munir; "Student of the Year" - Vishal–Shekhar, Anvita Dutt Guptan
Male Vocalist of the Year	Female Vocalist of the Year
**Sonu Nigam - "Abhi Mujh Mein Kahin"** from **Agneepath**; Ayushmann Khurrana - "Pani Da Rang (Male)" from Vicky Donor; Rabbi Shergill - "Challa" from Jab Tak Hai Jaan; Roop Kumar Rathod - "O Saiyyan" from Agneepath; Vishal Dadlani - "Jee Le Zaara" from Talaash	**Shreya Ghoshal - "Chikni Chameli"** from **Agneepath**; Kavita Seth - "Tum Hi Ho Bandhu" from Cocktail; Shalmali Kholgade - "Pareshaan" from Ishaqzaade; Shreya Ghoshal - "Saans" from Jab Tak Hai Jaan; Sunidhi Chauhan - "Gun Gun Guna" from Agneepath
Music Composer of the Year	Lyricist of the Year
**Ajay–Atul - "Abhi Mujh Mein Kahin"** from **Agneepath**; Ajay–Atul - "Chikni Chameli" from Agneepath; Pritam - "Ala Barfi" from Barfi!; Pritam - "Phir Le Aya Dil" from Barfi!; Pritam - "Tum Hi Ho Bandhu" from Cocktail	**Javed Akhtar - "Jee Le Zara"** from **Talaash**; Amitabh Bhattacharya - "Abhi Mujh Mein Kahin from Agneepath; Gulzar - "Saans" from Jab Tak Hai Jaan; Neelesh Misra - "Kyon" from Barfi!; Sameer Anjaan - "Dagabaaz Re" from Dabangg 2
Upcoming Male Vocalist of the Year	Upcoming Female Vocalist of the Year
**Arijit Singh - "Duaa"** from **Shanghai**; Arijit Singh - "Phir Le Aya Dil (Reprise)" from Barfi!; Ayushmann Khurrana - "Pani Da Rang (Male)" from Vicky Donor; Javed Bashir - "Tera Naam Japdi Phiran (Version 2)" from Cocktail; Nikhil Paul George - "Aashiyan (Solo)" from Barfi!; Nikhil Paul George - "Main Kya Karoon" from Barfi!	**Neeti Mohan - "Jiya Re"** from **Jab Tak Hai Jaan**; Priya Panchal - "Piya O Re Piya (Sad)" from Tere Naal Love Ho Gaya; Shalmali Kholgade - "Aga Bai" from Aiyyaa; Shalmali Kholgade - "Pareshaan" from Ishaqzaade; Suman Sridhar - "Muskaanein Jhoothi Hai" from Talaash
Upcoming Music Composer of The Year	Upcoming Lyricist of The Year
**Rochak Kohli and Ayushmann Khurrana - "Pani Da Rang (Male)"** from **Vicky Donor**; Anupam Amod - "Tera Deedar Hua" from Jannat 2; Anupam Amod - "Tera Deedar Hua (From The Heart)" from Jannat 2; Arko Pravo Mukherjee - "Abhi Abhi" from Jism 2; Donn and Bann - "Mar Jayian (Romantic)" from Vicky Donor	**Rochak Kohli and Ayushmann Khurrana - "Pani Da Rang (Male)"** from **Vicky Donor**; Arko Pravo Mukherjee and Manish Makhija - "Abhi Abhi" from Jism 2; Habib Faisal - "Chokra Jawaan" from Ishaqzaade; Sanjay Masoomm - "Rab Ka Shukrana" from Jannat 2; Sanjay Masoomm - "Tera Deedar Hua (From The Heart)" from Jannat 2
Song representing Sufi tradition	Raag-Inspired Song of the Year
**"O Saiyyan"** - **Agneepath**; "Raabta" - Agent Vinod; "Shah Ka Rutba" - Agneepath; "Challa" - Jab Tak Hai Jaan; "Maula" - Jism 2	**"Bolo Na"** - **Chittagong**; "Aiyo Piyaji" - Chakravyuh; "Dagabaaz Re" - Dabangg 2; "Krishna Leaving Vrindavan (Suno Suno Saanwre Ki...)" - Krishna Aur Kans; "Jiya Laage Na" - Talaash

=== Technical awards ===
Programmer & Arranger of the Year	Song Recording/Sound Engineering of the Year
**DJ Phukan and Hyacinth Dsouza - "Dil Mera Muft Ka"** from **Agent Vinod**; Ajay–Atul - "O Saiyyan" from Agneepath; Jim Satya and DJ Phukan - "Ala Barfi" from Barfi!; Ram Sampath and Vrashal Chavan - "Jiya Laage Na" from Talaash; Abhijit Nalani - "Mar Jayian (Romantic)" from Vicky Donor	**Vijay Dayal - "Deva Shree Ganesha"** from **Agneepath**; Vijay Dayal - "Abhi Mujh Mein Kahin" from Agneepath; Dipesh Sharma, Vijay Dayal, Karan Kulkarni and Alok Punjani - "Pareshaan" from Ishaqzaade; R Nitish Kumar, Shantanu Hudlikar and TR Krishna Chetan - "Challa" from Jab Tak Hai Jaan; Anish Gohil and Biswadeep Chatterjee - "Pani Da Rang (Male)" from Vicky Donor
Background Score of the Year
**Clinton Cerejo - Kahaani**; A. R. Rahman - Jab Tak Hai Jaan; Ajay–Atul - Agneepath; Pritam - Barfi!; Raju Singh - Raaz 3

=== Non-film awards ===
Indie Pop Song of the Year
- **"Brown Rang"** sung by **Yo Yo Honey Singh**
  - "Jin Ke Dum Se" sung by Rashid Ali
  - "Saahil Hai Kinara" sung by Rashid Ali
  - "In My City" sung by Priyanka Chopra and Will.i.am
  - "Chiraiyya" sung by Swanand Kirkire

=== Special awards ===
Lifetime Achievement Award	Asha Bhosle
Royal Stag Make It Large Award	Vishal Bhardwaj
Living Legend With Golden Voice	Amitabh Bachchan

=== Listeners' Choice awards ===
Listeners' Choice Song of the Year	"Radha" - Student of the Year
Listeners' Choice Album of the Year	Student of the Year

=== Jury awards ===
Outstanding Contribution to Hindi Film Music	Bablu Chakraborty
Best Album of Golden Era (1952)	Baiju Bawra

=== Films with multiple wins and nominations ===
Films that received multiple nominations
Nominations	Film
15	Agneepath
9	Barfi!
8	Vicky Donor
7	Jab Tak Hai Jaan
5	Cocktail
5	Ishaqzaade
5	Talaash
4	Jannat 2
3	Dabangg 2
3	Jism 2
2	Agent Vinod
2	Student of the Year

Films that received multiple awards
Wins	Film
7	Agneepath
2	Student of the Year‡
2	Vicky Donor

‡ Won two Listeners' Choice awards

== Jury ==
The jury was chaired by Javed Akhtar. Other members were:

- Aadesh Shrivastava - music composer and singer
- Alka Yagnik - playback singer
- Anu Malik - music director
- Ashutosh Gowariker - director, writer and producer
- Ila Arun - actress and folk singer
- Lalit Pandit - composer
- Kailash Kher - singer
- Kavita Krishnamurthy - playback singer
- Louis Banks - composer, record producer and singer
- Prasoon Joshi - lyricist and screenwriter
- Rakeysh Omprakash Mehra - filmmaker and screenwriter
- Ramesh Sippy - director and producer
- Sadhana Sargam - playback singer
- Sameer - lyricist
- Shankar Mahadevan - composer and playback singer
- Sooraj Barjatya - director, producer and screenwriter
- Suresh Wadkar - playback singer
- Talat Aziz - singer

== See also ==
- Mirchi Music Awards
