= Producers Guild Film Award for Best Male Debut =

Film and television award

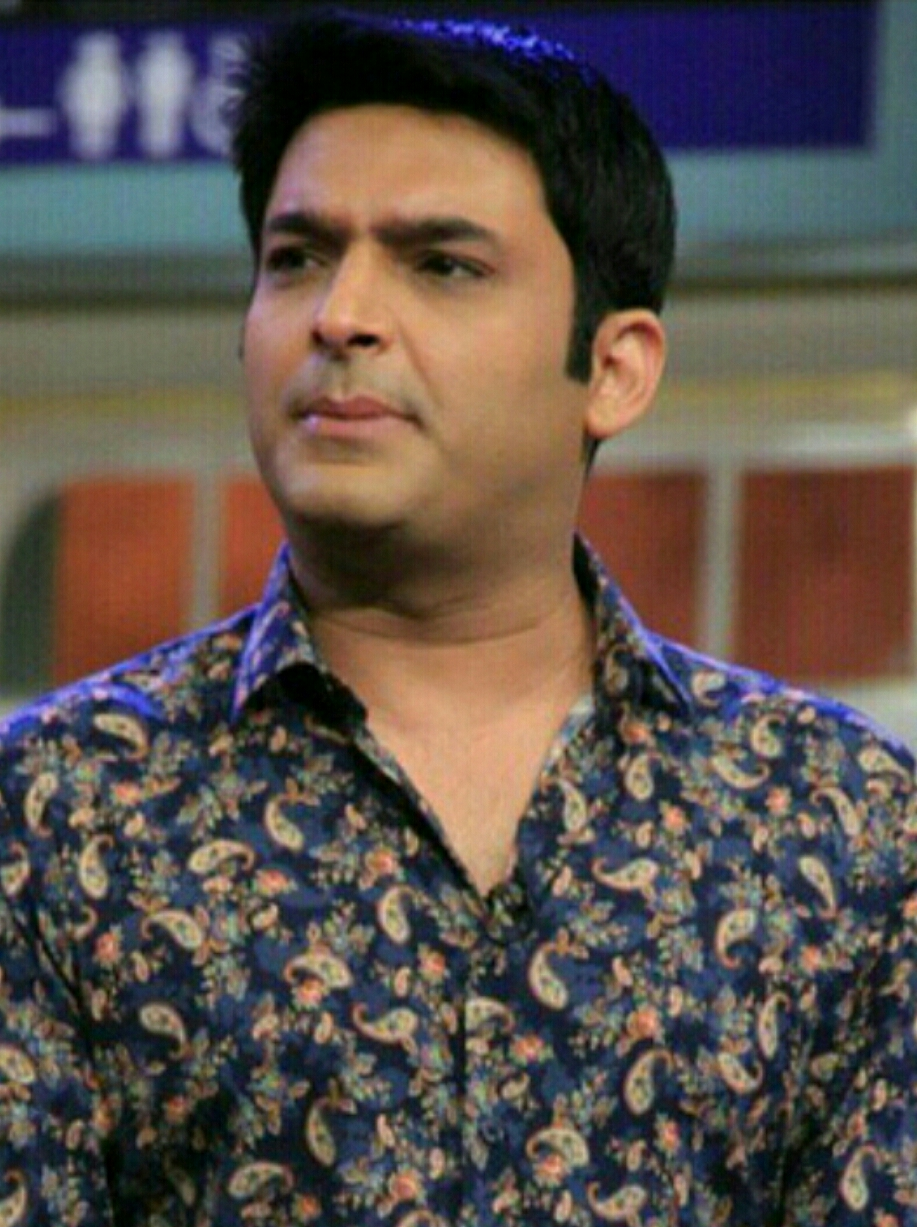
- 2016 Recipient Kapil Sharma
- Awarded for: Best Debut Performance by an Actor
- Country: India
- Presented by: Film & Television Producers Guild
- First award: 2008 (for performances in films released around 2007)
- Currently held by: Kapil Sharma, Kis Kisko Pyaar Karoon (2015)
- Website: Producers Guild Film Awards

The Producers Guild Film Award for Best Male Debut (previously known as the Apsara Award for Best Male Debut) is given by the producers of the film and television guild as part of its annual award ceremony for Hindi films, to recognise a male actor who has delivered an outstanding performance in his debut film. While the official awards ceremony started in 2004, awards for the best male debut commenced four years later.

== Winners ==
=== 2000s ===
- 2008
  Ranbir Kapoor – Saawariya as Ranbir Raj
- 2009
  Imran Khan – Jaane Tu... Ya Jaane Na as Jai Singh Rathore

=== 2010s ===
- 2010
  Jackky Bhagnani – Kal Kissne Dekha as Nihaal Singh
- 2011
  Ranveer Singh – Band Baaja Baaraat as Bittoo Sharma
- 2012
  Rana Daggubati – Dum Maaro Dum as DJ Joki Fernandes
- 2013
  Ayushmann Khurrana – Vicky Donor as Vicky Arora
- 2014
  Sushant Singh Rajput – Kai Po Che! as Ishaan Bhatt
- 2015
  Tiger Shroff – Heropanti as Bablu
- 2016
  Kapil Sharma – Kis Kisko Pyaar Karoon as Kumar Shiv Ram Krishna

== See also ==
- Producers Guild Film Awards
- Producers Guild Film Award for Best Female Debut
