= Rochak Kohli =

Indian music director

- Born: Chandigarh, India
- Education: Panjab University
- Occupations: Music director; Creative head of BigFM 92.7
- Years active: 2002–2007 (theatre & music); 2005–2013 (radio); 2012 – present (Music composer & Singer)
- Known for: Vicky Donor, Sonu Ke Titu Ki Sweety, Good Newwz
- Spouse: Sukriti Vadhera (m. 2009)

Rochak Kohli is an Indian music director for Bollywood films. He wrote the song 'Karan's Saddle Point'. He made his music debut in Shoojit Sircar's romantic comedy Vicky Donor with "Pani Da Rang". He is known for songs like "Paaniyon Sa" from Satyameva Jayate, "Tera Yaar Hoon Main" from Sonu Ke Titu Ki Sweety, "Lae Dooba" from Aiyaary.

Kohli is former national creative head of the radio station BIG FM 92.7.

== Early and personal life ==
Kohli was born into a Punjabi family in Chandigarh, Punjab. He is a qualified lawyer and completed his LLB (Bachelor of Law) from Panjab University. He married his longtime girlfriend Sukriti Vadhera in November 2009. They have a son together and his name is Eklavya.

== Discography ==
†	Denotes films that have not yet been released

Year	Song	Film title	Singer(s)	Lyrics(s)	Notes
2012	"Pani da Rang"	Vicky Donor	Ayushmann Khurrana	Ayushmann Khurrana, Rochak Kohli	co-composer and co-lyricist with Ayushmann Khurrana
2012	"Pani Da Rang (Female)"	Vicky Donor	Sukanya Purkayastha	Ayushmann Khurrana, Rochak Kohli	co-composer and co-lyricist with Ayushmann Khurrana
2012	"Kho Jaane De"	Vicky Donor	Clinton Cerejo, Aditi Singh Sharma	Juhi Chaturvedi	
2012	"Chaddha"	Vicky Donor	Rahul Sharma	Vijay Maurya	
2013	"Sadi Gal Aaja"	Nautanki Saala	Ayushmann Khurrana, Neeti Mohan	Ayushmann Khurrana, Rochak Kohli, Gurpreet Saini	Co-composed with Ayushmann Khurrana
2013	"Sadi Gali Aaja (Unplugged)"	Nautanki Saala	Ayushmann Khurrana	Ayushmann Khurrana, Rochak Kohli, Gurpreet Saini	Co-composed with Ayushmann Khurrana
2015	"Hawaizaada Dil"	Hawaizaada	Rochak Kholi	Vibhu Puri	Debut as a singer
2015	"Turram Khan"	Hawaizaada	Papon, Ayushmann Khurrana	Vibhu Puri	
2015	"Daak Ticket"	Hawaizaada	Mohit Chauhan, Javed Bashir	Vibhu Puri	
2015	"Lalla Lalla Lori"	Welcome 2 Karachi	Vishal Dadlani, Shivangi R. Kashyap	Rochak Kohli	
2015	Boat Ma Kukdookoo	Welcome 2 Karachi	Mika Singh, Rochak Kohli, Deane Sequeira, Shivangi R. Kashyap	Rochak Kohli	
2015	"Mera Yaar Funtastic"	Welcome 2 Karachi	Alamgir Khan	Sameer Anjaan	
2016	"Atrangi Yaari"	Wazir	Amitabh Bachchan, Farhan Akhtar	Gurpreet Saini, Deepak Ramola	
2016	"Har Gully Mein Dhoni Hai"	M.S. Dhoni: The Untold Story	Rochak Kohli	Manoj Muntashir	
2016	"Ulagam Engum Dhoni Ye"	M.S. Dhoni: The Untold Story	S. P. B. Charan	Pa. Vijay	Tamil Dub
2016	"Hey Fugay"	Fugay	Siddharth Mahadevan, Avdhoot Gupte	Mandar Cholkar	
2017	"Miliyo Re"	Monsoon Shootout	Rochak Kohli, Monali Thakur	Deepak Ramola	
2017	"Pal"	Monsoon Shootout	Arijit Singh	Sumant Vadhera	
2017	"Tu Chale Toh"	Qarib Qarib Single	Papon	Hussain Haidry	
2017	"Tanha Begum"	Qarib Qarib Single	Antara Mitra, Neeti Mohan, Rochak Kohli	Hussain Haidry	
2017	"Meer-E-Karwaan"	Lucknow Central	Amit Mishra, Neeti Mohan	Adeesh Verma	
2017	"Rozana"	Naam Shabana	Shreya Ghoshal	Manoj Muntashir	
2017	"Zinda"	Naam Shabana	Sunidhi Chauhan	Manoj Muntashir	
2017	"Zubi Zubi"	Naam Shabana	Sukriti Kakkar, Rochak Kohli	Manoj Muntashir	
2017	"Naalumaney"	Naam Shabana	Chinmayi Sripadaa	Rajesh Malarvannan	Tamil Dub
2017	Yeadho Konjamey"	Naam Shabana	Janani Madan	Rajesh Malarvannan	Tamil Dub
2017	"Zubi Zubi - Tamil"	Naam Shabana	Rita, Rochak Kohli	Rajesh Malarvannan	Tamil Dub
2017	"Tashreef"	Bank Chor	Rochak Kohli	Adheesh Verma	
2017	"Tashreef (Unplugged)"	Bank Chor	Rochak Kohli	Adheesh Verma	
2017	"Jai Baba Bank Chor"	Bank Chor	Nakash Aziz	Gautam Govind Sharma	
2018	"Nain Na Jodeen"	Badhaai Ho	Ayushmann Khurrana, Neha Kakkar	Kumaar	
2018	"Nain Na Jodeen (2nd version)"	Badhaai Ho	Akhil Sachdeva	Kumaar	used as single picturised on singer Akhil Sachdeva and model Ruhi Singh
2018	"Dekhte Dekhte"	Batti Gul Meter Chalu	Atif Aslam	Manoj Muntashir	Remake
2018	"Dekhte Dekhte (Film Version)"	Batti Gul Meter Chalu	Rahat Fateh Ali Khan	Manoj Muntashir	Remake
2018	"Paaniyon Sa"	Satyameva Jayate	Atif Aslam, Tulsi Kumar	Kumaar	
2018	"Lakk Mera Hit"	Sonu Ke Titu Ki Sweety	Sukriti Kakkar, Mannat Noor, Rochak Kohli	Kumaar	
2018	"Tera Yaar Hoon Main"	Sonu Ke Titu Ki Sweety	Arijit Singh	Kumaar	
2018	"Lae Dooba"	Aiyaary	Sunidhi Chauhan	Manoj Muntashir	
2018	"Lae Dooba (2nd Version)"	Aiyaary	Asees Kaur	Manoj Muntashir	
2018	"Shuru Kar"	Aiyaary	Amit Mishra, Neha Bhasin, Rochak Kohli	Manoj Muntashir	
2019	Dil Na Jaaneya	Good Newwz	Rochak Kohli, Lauv, Akasa Singh	Gurpreet Saini, Ari Leff, Michael Pollock	Along with Lauv
2019	Dil Na Jaaneya (Unplugged)	Good Newwz	Arijit Singh	Gurpreet Saini	
2019	Tu Hi Yaar Mera	Pati Patni Aur Woh	Arijit Singh, Neha Kakkar	Kumaar	
2019	Tu Hi Yaar Mera (Film Version)	Pati Patni Aur Woh	Armaan Malik	Kumaar	Not released
2019	Udd Gaye	Pati Patni Aur Woh	Armaan Malik	Kumaar	Used in the film Not released
2019	Pyaar Ka Satellite	Satellite Shankar	Rochak Kohli, Amit Gupta	Kumaar	
2019	Jako Raake Saiyaan	Batla House	Navraj Hans, Rochak Kohli	Gurpreet Saini, Gautam G Sharma	Remake
2019	TBA	Batla House	Armaan Malik	Gurpreet Saini, Gautam G Sharma	Not released
2019	Bheege Mann	Khandaani Shafakhana	Altamash Faridi	Gurpreet Saini, Gautam G Sharma	
2019	Udd Ja	Khandaani Shafakhana	Tochi Raina	Kumaar	
2019	Dil Royi Jaaye	De De Pyaar De	Arijit Singh	Kumaar	
2019	Yaaram	Yaaram	Yasser Desai, Chitralekha Sen	Kumaar	
2019	Rhimjhim Gire Sawan	Music Teacher	Shreya Ghoshal, Papon	Yogesh	Solo Composer; Netflix film
2019	Phir Wahi Raat	Music Teacher	Papon	Gulzar	Solo Composer; Netflix film
2019	Ik Mod (Male)	Music Teacher	Papon	Adheesh Verma	Solo Composer; Netflix film
2019	Ik Mod (Female)	Music Teacher	Neeti Mohan	Adheesh Verma	Solo Composer; Netflix film
2019	Sambhaal Rakhiyan (Female)	Music Teacher	Neeti Mohan	Gurpreet Saini	Solo Composer; Netflix film
2019	Sambhaal Rakhiyan (Male)	Music Teacher	Jubin Nautiyal	Gurpreet Saini	Solo Composer; Netflix film
2019	Ek Ladki Ko Dekha Toh Aisa Laga (Remake)	Ek Ladki Ko Dekha Toh Aisa Laga	Darshan Raval	Gurpreet Saini	Solo Composer
2019	Gud Naal Ishq Mitha (Remake)	Ek Ladki Ko Dekha Toh Aisa Laga	Harshdeep Kaur, Navraj Hans	Gurpreet Saini	Solo Composer
2019	Good Morning	Ek Ladki Ko Dekha Toh Aisa Laga	Vishal Dadlani, Shannon Donald	Gurpreet Saini	Solo Composer
2019	Chitthiye	Ek Ladki Ko Dekha Toh Aisa Laga	Kanwar Grewal	Gurpreet Saini	Solo Composer
2019	House Party Song	Ek Ladki Ko Dekha Toh Aisa Laga	Sukhwinder Singh, Arjun Kanungo, Parry G	Gurpreet Saini	Solo Composer
2019	"Dil Mein Ho Tum"	Why Cheat India	Armaan Malik	Manoj Muntashir	Remake
2019	"Dil Mein Ho Tum (Female)"	Why Cheat India	Tulsi Kumar	Manoj Muntashir	Remake
2020	Dil Tera	Indoo Ki Jawani	Benny Dayal, Neeti Mohan	Gurpreet Saini, Gautam G Sharma	
2020	Single Ladies	Indoo Ki Jawani	Sukhe, Jonita Gandhi	Gurpreet Saini, Gautam G Sharma	
2020	Tujhe Rab Mana	Baaghi 3	Shaan	Gurpreet Saini, Gautam G Sharma	
2021	Raja Boy	Velle	Mika Singh, Vayu	Vayu	
2021	Yaaron Ka Bulava	Velle	Armaan Malik, Asees Kaur	Vayu	
2021	Meri Zindagi Hai Tu	Satyameva Jayate 2	Jubin Nautiyal, Neeti Mohan	Manoj Muntashir	Remake
2021	Meri Zindagi Hai Tu - Female	Satyameva Jayate 2	Neeti Mohan	Manoj Muntashir	Remake
2021	Jaane De	Koi Jaane Na	B Praak	Manoj Muntashir	
2021	Zindagi Ki Yehi Reet Hai	Koi Jaane Na	Soumitra Dev Burman	Manoj Muntashir	
2021	Rabb Manneya	Koi Jaane Na	Lakhwinder Wadali, Neeti Mohan	Manoj Muntashir, Sham Deewana	
2021	Rabb Manneya (2nd Version)	Koi Jaane Na	Atif Aslam	Manoj Muntashir, Sham Deewana	Not released
2021	Thok De Killi	Time to Dance	Navraj Hans	Kumaar	
2022	Chup Ke Chup Ke	Mister Mummy	Armaan Malik, Shilpa Rao, Rochak Kohli	Kumaar	Remake
2022	Chup Ke Chup Ke (Film Version)	Mister Mummy	Armaan Malik, Shilpa Rao, Rochak Kohli	Kumaar	Remake
2022	Jaau Jaan Se	Phone Bhoot	Rochak Kohli, Lisa Mishra	Kumaar	
2022	Jaau Jaan Se (Chill Mix)	Phone Bhoot	Rochak Kohli, Lisa Mishra	Kumaar	
2022	Hello	Govinda Naam Mera	Rochak Kohli	Gurpreet Saini	Disney Plus Hotstar film
2022	Dil De Diya	Thank God	Anand Raj Anand	Rashmi Virag	Remake
2022	Thank God - Title Track	Thank God	Arijit Singh	Manoj Muntashir	
2022	TBA	Dhokha: Round D Corner		Gurpreet Saini	Dropped from the album
2023	Pasoori Nu	Satyaprem Ki Katha	Arijit Singh, Tulsi Kumar	Gurpreet Saini, Ali Sethi	Remake of "Pasoori" by Ali Sethi
2023	Maati Ko Maa Kehte Hain	Mission Majnu	Sonu Nigam	Manoj Muntashir	Netflix film
2023	Maati Ko Maa Kehte Hain - Extended Version	Mission Majnu	Sonu Nigam	Manoj Muntashir	Netflix film
2024	Zid Na Kaaro	Dedh Bigha Zameen	Stebin Ben	Manoj Muntashir	JioCinema film Remake
2024	Jaavi Na	Ishq Vishk Rebound	Darshan Raval, Jasleen Royal	Kumaar	
2024	Ishq Vishk Pyaar Vyaar	Ishq Vishk Rebound	Sonu Nigam, Nikhita Gandhi, MellowD	Gurpreet Saini	Remade from the prequel
2024	Chot Dil Pe Lagi	Ishq Vishk Rebound	Asees Kaur, Varun Jain	Gurpreet Saini	Remade from the prequel
2024	Soni Soni	Ishq Vishk Rebound	Darshan Raval, Jonita Gandhi	Gurpreet Saini	
2024	Rehmat (Rebound)	Ishq Vishk Rebound	Rekha Bhardwaj, Rochak Kohli	Gurpreet Saini	
2024	Rehmat	Ishq Vishk Rebound	Jubin Nautiyal	Gurpreet Saini, Gautam G Sharma	
2024	Rehmat (ALT)	Ishq Vishk Rebound	Rochak Kohli	Gurpreet Saini, Gautam G Sharma	
2024	Haule Haule	Bad Newz	Jubin Nautiyal	Gurpreet Saini, Gautam G Sharma	
2024	Haule Sajna	Bad Newz	Ammy Virk	Gurpreet Saini, Gautam G Sharma	
2024	Chal Ve Dilla	Khel Khel Mein	Vishal Mishra	Kumaar	
2024	Khwaish Poori	Call Me Bae	Jubin Nautiyal, Rochak Kohli	Gurpreet Saini	Amazon Prime Video series
2024	Khwaish Adhoori	Call Me Bae	Akanksha Sethi	Gurpreet Saini	Amazon Prime Video series
2025	"Tumhe Dillagi"	Raid 2	Jubin Nautiyal	Manoj Muntashir, Purnam Allahabadi, Nusrat Fateh Ali Khan	Remake
2025	"Jab Tu Sajan"	Aap Jaisa Koi	Mohit Chauhan	Gurpreet Saini	Netflix film
2025	"Dhuan Dhuan"	Aap Jaisa Koi	Sanjith Hegde	Gurpreet Saini	Netflix film
2025	"Preet Re"	Dhadak 2	Darshan Raval, Jonita Gandhi	Gurpreet Saini	
2025	"Yeh Kaisa Ishq"	Dhadak 2	Rochak Kohli	Gurpreet Saini	Also as a playback singer
2026	"Muskura Do"	Drishyam: The Conclusion	Lucky Ali	Manoj Muntashir	
2026	"Pyaar Manga Hai Tumhi Se"	Pehla Pyaar Doosri Baar	Jubin Nautiyal	Raj Shekhar	
2026	"Purane Din"	Pehla Pyaar Doosri Baar	Arijit Singh	Kumaar	
2026	"Jaane Kis Mod Pe"	Pehla Pyaar Doosri Baar	Darshan Raval, Shreya Jain	Gurpreet Saini	
2026	"Chaand"	Pehla Pyaar Doosri Baar	Faheem Abdullah	Gurpreet Saini	
2026	"Saale Dil"	Pehla Pyaar Doosri Baar	Aditya Rikhari	Gurpreet Saini	
2026	"Kamaal"	Pehla Pyaar Doosri Baar	Rochak Kohli	Kumaar	Also as a playback singer
2026	"Chaand (Unplugged)"	Pehla Pyaar Doosri Baar	Aditya Rikhari	Gurpreet Saini	

== Non-film songs ==
Year	Song	Singer(s)	Lyrics	Cast	Language	Note(s)
2024	Jiya Laage Na	Mohit Chauhan, Shilpa Rao		Isha Malviya, Parth Samthaan	Hindi	
2022	Mast Nazron Se	Jubin Nautiyal	Manoj Muntashir	Jubin Nautiyal, Nikita Dutta	Hindi	Released on T-Series YouTube Channel
2021	Barsaat Ki Dhun	Jubin Nautiyal	Rashmi Virag	Gurmeet Choudhary, Karishma Sharma	Hindi	Released on T-Series YouTube Channel
2021	Tujhe Bhoolna Toh Chaha	Jubin Nautiyal	Manoj Muntashir	Jubin Nautiyal, Abhishek Singh, Sameera Khan	Hindi	
2021	Main Jis Din Bhulaa Du	Jubin Nautiyal, Tulsi Kumar	Manoj Muntashir	Jubin Nautiyal, Himansh Kohli, Sneha	Hindi	
2020	Meri Aashiqui	Jubin Nautiyal	Rashmi Virag	Jubin Nautiyal, Ihana Dhillion	Hindi	Released on T-Series YouTube Channel
2020	Bewafai	Sachet Tandon	Manoj Muntashir	Faisu, Musskan Sethi & Aadil Khan	Hindi	Released on T-Series YouTube Channel
2020	Mausama	Gurpreet Saini, Gautam G Sharma	Rochak Kohli	Wamiqa Gabbi, Priyanshu Painyuli	Hindi	Released on Rochak Kohli YouTube Channel
2020	Yeh Saari Baat	Srishti Ganguli Rindani & Ritvik Sahore	Rochak Kohli	Anubhav Bhadauria, Gurpreet Saini, Gautam G Sharma	Hindi	Released on Rochak Kohli YouTube Channel
2018	Chan Kitthan	Ayushmann Khurrana		Ayushmann Khurrana, Pranitha Subhash	Hindi	
2018	Jaane Yeh Kyun Kiya				Hindi	
2017	Man Marziyan				Hindi	T-Series
2015	Maa	Mika Singh		Mika Singh	Hindi	
2015	Yahin Hoon Main	Ayushmann Khurrana		Ayushmann Khurrana, Yami Gautam	Hindi	
2014	Mitti Di Khushboo	Ayushmann Khurrana		Ayushmann Khurrana, Huma Qureshi	Hindi	
2014	Music Dil Mein				Hindi	Promotional song for World music day on 9XM
2013	O Heeriye	Ayushmann Khurrana		Ayushmann Khurrana, Rhea Chakraborty	Hindi	
2013	Living with KKR			Shah Rukh Khan	Hindi	
2012	Suno Sunao	Rochak Kohli		Radio Song	Hindi	Radio FM

== Background score ==
- Welcome 2 Karachi (2015)

== Awards and nominations ==
Year	Category	Song and Film	Result	Ref.
IIFA Awards 2019
2019	Best Music Direction	Sonu Ke Titu Ki Sweety	Winner	
Mirchi Music Awards
2012	Upcoming Music Composer of The Year	"Pani Da Rang (Male)" - Vicky Donor	Nominated	
2012	Upcoming Lyricist of The Year	"Pani Da Rang (Male)" - Vicky Donor	Nominated	
