= Pani Da Rang =

Single by Ayushman Khurrana

- Still from the music video of "Pani Da Rang"

Song by Ayushman Khurrana

from the album Vicky Donor
- Released: 1 February 2012
- Genre: Filmi, Acoustic pop
- Length: 4:00 (male version); 4:47 (female version)
- Label: Eros Music
- Songwriters: Ayushmann Khurrana; Rochak Kohli

Audio sample
- "Pani Da Rang" (Male Version): file; help

"Pani Da Rang" (transl. The Colour of Water) is a song from the 2012 Hindi film Vicky Donor, written and composed by Ayushmann Khurrana and Rochak Kohli. The song was performed in the film by Khurrana in his role as the titular Vicky. A longer version of the song was composed with female vocals performed by Sukanya Purkayastha which was also played in the film.

== Composition ==
Khurrana wrote "Pani Da Rang" in 2003 in collaboration with Kohli during their time at DAV College. The song is written almost entirely in Punjabi.

== Use in Vicky Donor ==
"Pani Da Rang" is performed by Khurrana's character Vicky Arora for Ashima Roy, played by Yami Gautam, after they decide to get married; it continues to play in the background as the characters share romantic and intimate moments together.

The slower, female version of the song plays in background during scenes following Vicky and Ashima's separation.

== Awards ==
Year	Award	Category	Recipient(s) and nominee(s)	Result	Ref(s)
2012	Global Indian Music Academy Awards	Hottest Song of the Year	Ayushmann Khurrana and Rochak Kohli	Won	
2012	BIG Star Entertainment Awards	Most Entertaining Song	Ayushmann Khurrana and Rochak Kohli	Won	
2013	5th Mirchi Music Awards	Upcoming Music Composer of The Year	Ayushmann Khurrana and Rochak Kohli	Won	
2013	5th Mirchi Music Awards	Upcoming Lyricist of The Year	Ayushmann Khurrana and Rochak Kohli	Won	
2013	5th Mirchi Music Awards	Song of The Year	Ayushmann Khurrana and Rochak Kohli	Nominated	
2013	5th Mirchi Music Awards	Male Vocalist of The Year	Ayushmann Khurrana	Nominated	
2013	5th Mirchi Music Awards	Upcoming Male Vocalist of The Year	Ayushmann Khurrana	Nominated	
2013	5th Mirchi Music Awards	Song Recording/Sound Engineering of the Year	Anish Gohil and Biswadeep Chatterjee	Nominated	
2013	58th Filmfare Awards	Best Playback Singer (Male)	Ayushmann Khurrana	Won	
