= Vicky Donor =

2012 Indian film by Shoojit Sircar

- Theatrical release poster
- Directed by: Shoojit Sircar
- Written by: Juhi Chaturvedi
- Produced by: John Abraham; Sunil Lulla; Ronnie Lahiri
- Starring: Ayushmann Khurrana; Yami Gautam; Annu Kapoor; Dolly Ahluwalia
- Cinematography: Kamaljeet Negi
- Edited by: Chandrashekhar Prajapati
- Music by: Songs & Score: Abhishek-Akshay; Additional Songs: Bann Chakraborty; Rochak Kohli; Ayushmann Khurrana
- Production companies: Eros International; Rising Sun Films; J.A. Entertainment
- Distributed by: Eros Entertainment
- Release date: 20 April 2012
- Running time: 125 minutes
- Country: India
- Language: Hindi
- Budget: ₹4 crore
- Box office: est. ₹68.32 crore

Vicky Donor is a 2012 Indian Hindi-language romantic comedy film directed by Shoojit Sircar and produced by actor John Abraham in his maiden production venture with Sunil Lulla under Eros International and Ronnie Lahiri under Rising Sun Films. The film stars Ayushmann Khurrana and Yami Gautam, with Annu Kapoor and Dolly Ahluwalia in pivotal roles. The concept is set against the background of sperm donation and infertility within a Bengali-Punjabi household. Both Ayushmann and Yami made their film debut through this film.

Vicky Donor was released on 20 April 2012 at around 750 screens in India. The film opened to universal critical acclaim and performed strongly at the box office. It became a commercial success grossing ₹66.32 crore worldwide, against a budget of ₹10 crore.

At the 60th National Film Awards, Vicky Donor won the National Film Award for Best Popular Film Providing Wholesome Entertainment. At the 58th Filmfare Awards, it received 8 nominations, including Best Film, Best Director (Sircar), Best Supporting Actress (Ahluwalia) and Best Female Debut (Gautam), and won 4 awards, including Best Supporting Actor (Kapoor) and Best Male Debut (Khurrana).

The film was remade in Telugu as Naruda Donoruda (2016) and in Tamil as Dharala Prabhu (2020).

== Plot ==
Dr. Baldev Chaddha is a fertility expert who runs a clinic and a sperm bank in Daryaganj, Delhi, that guarantees high-quality sperm for couples. He has more failed cases than successes. He is on the lookout for a healthy and high-performing donor.

Vikram "Vicky" Arora hails from an Arora Punjabi family and is the only son of his widowed mother Dolly, who runs a small beauty parlour in Lajpat Nagar. They live with Vicky's grandmother. Vicky is a vagabond who provides no financial support to the household and starts searching for a job that will provide them with a better lifestyle.

Chaddha meets Vicky and likes his happy-go-lucky nature. He believes Vicky is the donor he has been looking for. He stalks him and eventually painstakingly convinces him to become a sperm donor. Though Vicky is hesitant at first, he accepts after being offered a high salary. Chaddha gets Vicky's semen sample tested from a lab and is delighted to hear that it was a sample with a very high sperm count. Chaddha decides to use it for his patients and starts getting high success rates. Vicky hides his career after facing ridicule from his friends but starts spending wildly renovating his house and the parlour. Chaddha too earns handsomely in this business.

Vicky meets an ambitious accountant, Ashima Roy, at the bank, and they fall in love after going out a number of times. They soon wish to get married, but as a divorced Bengali bank employee wanting to marry a carefree man from a loud Punjabi family, both face backlash from their families. However, they eventually manage to get everyone's approval. Vicky continues to hide his occupation and stops donating sperm after getting married, ignoring Chaddha, who continues to chase Vicky as he is his most successful donor.

In an ironic turn of events, the couple discovers that Ashima is infertile. Both of them get tested, but Vicky does not take the fertility test and is forced to admit to being a sperm donor. Taken aback by her husband's strange career, Ashima leaves for her paternal home. Vicky is heartbroken and cuts all ties with Chaddha.

The parlour is soon raided by income tax officers due to their frivolous renovations. Vicky is arrested on suspicion of handling black money but is bailed out by Dr. Chaddha, who reveals his occupation to his family members. Vicky's mother is disgusted and also apologises to Ashima. Vicky's grandmother and Ashima's father make them understand how Vicky's deed has helped many families bear children and ask them to have a progressive take on this.

Chaddha's assistant finds out the list of couples to whom Vicky has donated his sperm. Chaddha calls Vicky and Ashima to an event he has hosted where all families that Vicky helped bear children are present and helps Ashima see how his step helped them find happiness. He then tells them that one child is absent. This little girl has lost her parents in an accident. Her grandparents failed to contact Chaddha's clinic and had to send her to an orphanage. Dr. Chaddha suggests the couple adopt a little girl, Diya. Ashima begins to see reason and understands. The couple reunites, adopts the little girl, and Vicky continues to occasionally donate sperm for Chaddha's clinic.

== Cast ==
- Ayushmann Khurrana as Vikram "Vicky" Arora a.k.a. Vicky Donor
- Yami Gautam as Ashima "Tuna" Roy, Vicky's wife
- Annu Kapoor as Dr. Baldev Chaddha
- Dolly Ahluwalia as Mrs. Dolly Arora, Vicky's mother
- Kamlesh Gill as Biji, Vicky's grandmother
- Puja Gupta as Shweta (Vicky's Neighbour)
- Jayant Das as Mr. Roy (Ashima's Father)
- Swaroopa Ghosh as Pishi (Ashima's Aunt)
- Inderpal Singh as Tayaji
- Bupesh Pandya as Chaman (Dr. Chadhha's Assistant)
- K.V Rajni as nurse Lata.
- Paramjyot Singh as Vicky's Mama Ji
- John Abraham as himself in the song "Rum Whisky"
- Vijay Meenu as Parent in Chaddha's hospital

== Themes and development ==
Vicky Donor deals with sperm donation and infertility. When questioned about the risky subject matter, Abraham responded, "Basically, Vicky Donor is a romantic comedy. But the concept is set against the background of sperm donation." Abraham hoped that the film could shed light on a serious issue still considered "taboo" in Indian society.

Sircar said, "I want to take a light-hearted look at the taboo attached to infertility and artificial insemination." Before filming began, Sircar researched the plot themes for three years. Juhi Chaturvedi, creative director at advertising agency Bates, who wrote the screenplay based on her own idea, had stayed in Lajpat Nagar as a student at College of Arts, Delhi. As the script went through several drafts, she met a couple who run a noted fertility clinic in Mumbai.

== Production ==
Despite the usual trend, Abraham did not take up the leading role in the film: "It was a conscious decision to not act in my first production because I believe producing a film is about creating quality content that I believe in." Director Sircar suggested Khurrana, a video jockey and television host, for the role of Vicky; he was considered because he was popular among the youth. He "can read and write Punjabi too." Khurrana turned down three film projects to play the lead in Vicky Donor. To prepare for the role, he met medical experts and donors to understand sperm donation; a major medical consultant specializing in the field was later inducted as a medical adviser for the film. Additionally, Khurrana studied acting and attended workshops with N.K. Sharma in Delhi. It was later reported that Abraham would perform an "item number." Commenting on his performance, Abraham said "I am glad I cast Ayushmann in the lead. He's a complete natural, has all the trappings of a fine actor and has delivered a super performance. It doesn't seem like Vicky Donor is his first film." It was reported that the production crew would feature "the best technicians from Los Angeles" and acclaimed action choreographer J J Perry. Incidentally, Ayushmann who plays the lead role, successfully performed a task on the second season of the reality show MTV Roadies, which was sperm donation.

== Soundtrack ==
The soundtrack album features eight tracks which were composed by Abhishek-Akshay, Bann, Rochak Kohli and Ayushmann Khurrana. All of them contributed two tracks each. Actor Khurrana also composed and sung the track "Pani Da Rang" which was released as a single on 1 February 2012. The song was well received by music listeners. The song has a female version composed by Khurrana, and it was sung by Sukanya Purkayastha. The strings were later re-recorded by Aditya Kumar for the online version. The entire album released by Eros Music on 29 February 2012.

The soundtrack album received positive reviews from critics. IBNlive.in says "Vicky Donor album tracks are worth listening and contain rawness." Ayushmann Khurrana won the Filmfare Award for Best Male Playback Singer at 58th Filmfare Awards for "Pani Da Rang."

== Reception ==
=== Critical reception ===
Vicky Donor received critical acclaim upon release. Blessy Chettiar of DNA India rated the film with 4/5 and said, "Run to the nearest theatre and surrender yourself to charm of Vicky and his team. This "Aryaputra" provides only good quality entertainment." Madhureeta Mukherjee of The Times of India gave Vicky Donor 3.5 out of 5 and said, "It takes a man to make a film like this, literally. Kudos to John Abraham for his brave maiden production. Thankfully, this sperm hits bullseye." Mathures Paul of The Statesman gave the film 3.5/5 and wrote, "Vicky Donor is an admirable movie that is at once simple, emotional, daring and in your face."

=== Box office ===
==== India ====
The film had an opening at the box office worldwide and collected ₹18.8 million (US$200,000) on its first day in India. Vicky Donor showed good growth on Saturday as all India collections jumped around 35%–40%; it collected around ₹26.0 million (US$270,000) nett taking its two-day business to ₹45.0 million (US$470,000) nett. The film got tough competition from Housefull 2 in its first week of theatrical run in India. Vicky Donor is the 3rd small-budget film of 2012 after Paan Singh Tomar and Kahaani to receive such an acceptance by critics, multiplex goers and urban audience. It grossed ₹32.5 million (US$340,000) nett on Sunday. Vicky Donor had a decent three-day weekend as it grossed around ₹77.5 million (US$800,000) nett over its first weekend.

It had a good first week of around ₹135.0 million (US$1.4 million) nett. Vicky Donor had an excellent second week collecting around ₹112.5 million (US$1.2 million) nett taking its two-week total to around ₹255.0 million (US$2.6 million) nett. Vicky Donor continued its strong run into the third week and totally grossed ₹405.0 million (US$4.2 million).

==== Overseas ====
The film had a wide release with close to 125 prints and grossed a decent $350,000 overseas in four days. It has done well in North America and decently in other markets.

Grosses are as follow:

- UK: £90,329 ($140,600)
- USA: $466,467
- UAE: $286,000
- Australia: $88,682

Total: $1.2 million (65 million)

== Accolades ==
Date of ceremony	Award	Category	Recipient(s) and nominee(s)	Result	Ref.
3 May 2013	National Film Awards	Best Popular Film Providing Wholesome Entertainment	Producer: Sunil Lulla, John Abraham, Ronnie Lahiri and Ram Mirchandani Director: Shoojit Sircar	Won	
3 May 2013	National Film Awards	Best Supporting Actor	Annu Kapoor	Won	
3 May 2013	National Film Awards	Best Supporting Actress	Dolly Ahluwalia	Won	
20 January 2013	Filmfare Awards	Best Film	John Abraham, Shoojit Sircar, Sunil Lulla	Nominated	
20 January 2013	Filmfare Awards	Best Director	Shoojit Sircar	Nominated	
20 January 2013	Filmfare Awards	Best Supporting Actor	Annu Kapoor	Won	
20 January 2013	Filmfare Awards	Best Supporting Actress	Dolly Ahluwalia	Nominated	
20 January 2013	Filmfare Awards	Best Male Debut	Ayushmann Khurana	Won	
20 January 2013	Filmfare Awards	Best Female Debut	Yami Gautam	Nominated	
20 January 2013	Filmfare Awards	Best Male Playback Singer	Ayushmann Khurrana (for the song "Pani Da Rang")	Won	
20 January 2013	Filmfare Awards	Best Story	Juhi Chaturvedi	Won	
12 January 2013	Star Screen Awards	Best Supporting Actress	Dolly Ahluwalia	Won	
12 January 2013	Star Screen Awards	Best Male Debut	Ayushmann Khurrana	Won	
12 January 2013	Star Screen Awards	Best Comedian	Annu Kapoor	Won	
12 January 2013	Star Screen Awards	Best Comedian	Kamlesh Gill	Nominated	
12 January 2013	Star Screen Awards	Best Film	John Abraham, Shoojit Sircar, Sunil Lulla	Nominated	
12 January 2013	Star Screen Awards	Best Director	Shoojit Sircar	Nominated	
12 January 2013	Star Screen Awards	Best Female Debut	Yami Gautam	Nominated	
12 January 2013	Star Screen Awards	Best Lyrics	Ayushmann Khurrana, Rochak Kohli (for the song "Pani Da Rang")	Nominated	
12 January 2013	Star Screen Awards	Best Male Playback Singer	Ayushmann Khurrana (for the song "Pani Da Rang")	Nominated	
12 January 2013	Star Screen Awards	Best Story	Juhi Chaturvedi	Nominated	
12 January 2013	Star Screen Awards	Best Production Design	Mansi Dhruv Mehta, Vinod	Nominated	
12 January 2013	Star Screen Awards	Best Editing	Shekhar Prajapati	Nominated	
16 February 2013	Producers Guild Film Awards	Best Film	John Abraham, Shoojit Sircar, Sunil Lulla	Nominated	
16 February 2013	Producers Guild Film Awards	Best Director	Shoojit Sircar	Nominated	
16 February 2013	Producers Guild Film Awards	Best Actor	Ayushmann Khurrana	Nominated	
16 February 2013	Producers Guild Film Awards	Best Male Debut	Ayushmann Khurrana	Won	
16 February 2013	Producers Guild Film Awards	Best Female Debut	Yami Gautam	Nominated	
16 February 2013	Producers Guild Film Awards	Best Supporting Actor	Annu Kapoor	Won	
16 February 2013	Producers Guild Film Awards	Best Comedian	Annu Kapoor	Won	
16 February 2013	Producers Guild Film Awards	Best Supporting Actress	Dolly Ahluwalia	Won	
16 February 2013	Producers Guild Film Awards	Best Screenplay	Juhi Chaturvedi	Nominated	
16 February 2013	Producers Guild Film Awards	Best Story	Juhi Chaturvedi	Won	
16 February 2013	Producers Guild Film Awards	Best Dialogue	Juhi Chaturvedi	Won	
16 February 2013	Producers Guild Film Awards	Best Lyricist	Ayushmann Khurrana, Rochak Kohli (for the song "Pani Da Rang")	Nominated	
16 February 2013	Producers Guild Film Awards	Best Male Playback Singer	Ayushmann Khurrana (for the song "Pani Da Rang")	Won	
6 April 2013	Times of India Film Awards	Best Film	Shoojit Sircar	Nominated	
6 April 2013	Times of India Film Awards	Best Director	Shoojit Sircar	Nominated	
6 April 2013	Times of India Film Awards	Best Supporting Actor	Annu Kapoor	Won	
6 April 2013	Times of India Film Awards	Best Comic Actor	Annu Kapoor	Nominated	
6 April 2013	Times of India Film Awards	Best Supporting Actress	Dolly Ahluwalia	Won	
6 April 2013	Times of India Film Awards	Best Male Debut	Ayushmann Khurrana	Won	
6 April 2013	Times of India Film Awards	Best Female Debut	Yami Gautam	Nominated	
6 April 2013	Times of India Film Awards	Best Male Playback Singer	Ayushmann Khurrana (for the song "Pani Da Rang")	Nominated	
7 January 2013	Zee Cine Awards	Best Male Debut	Ayushmann Khurrana	Won	
7 January 2013	Zee Cine Awards	Best Female Debut	Yami Gautam	Won	
6 July 2013	International Indian Film Academy Awards	Best Film	John Abraham, Shoojit Sircar, Sunil Lulla	Nominated	
6 July 2013	International Indian Film Academy Awards	Best Director	Shoojit Sircar	Nominated	
6 July 2013	International Indian Film Academy Awards	Best Actor	Ayushmann Khurrana	Nominated	
6 July 2013	International Indian Film Academy Awards	Best Male Debut	Ayushmann Khurrana	Won	
6 July 2013	International Indian Film Academy Awards	Best Female Debut	Yami Gautam	Won	
6 July 2013	International Indian Film Academy Awards	Best Performance in a Comic Role	Annu Kapoor	Nominated	
6 July 2013	International Indian Film Academy Awards	Best Supporting Actor	Annu Kapoor	Won	
6 July 2013	International Indian Film Academy Awards	Best Supporting Actress	Dolly Ahluwalia	Nominated	
6 July 2013	International Indian Film Academy Awards	Best Dialogue	Juhi Chaturvedi	Won	
6 July 2013	International Indian Film Academy Awards	Best Story	Juhi Chaturvedi	Nominated	
6 July 2013	International Indian Film Academy Awards	Best Lyricist	Ayushmann Khurrana, Rochak Kohli (for the song "Pani Da Rang")	Nominated	
6 July 2013	International Indian Film Academy Awards	Best Male Playback Singer	Ayushmann Khurrana (for the song "Pani Da Rang")	Nominated	
31 December 2012	Big Star Entertainment Awards	Most Entertaining Film of the Year	John Abraham, Shoojit Sircar, Sunil Lulla	Nominated	
31 December 2012	Big Star Entertainment Awards	Most Entertaining Film (Comedy)	John Abraham, Shoojit Sircar, Sunil Lulla	Nominated	
31 December 2012	Big Star Entertainment Awards	Most Entertainment Debut - Male	Ayushmann Khurrana	Won	
31 December 2012	Big Star Entertainment Awards	Most Entertaining Debut - Female	Yami Gautam	Nominated	
31 December 2012	Big Star Entertainment Awards	Most Entertaining Song	Ayushmann Khurrana, Rochak Kohli (for the song "Pani Da Rang")	Won	
7 February 2013	Mirchi Music Awards	Song of the Year	Ayushmann Khurrana (for the song "Pani Da Rang")	Nominated	
7 February 2013	Mirchi Music Awards	Upcoming Male Vocalist of the Year	Ayushmann Khurrana (for the song "Pani Da Rang")	Nominated	
7 February 2013	Mirchi Music Awards	Upcoming Music Composer of the Year	Donn & Bann (for the song "Marr Jayian")	Nominated	
7 February 2013	Mirchi Music Awards	Upcoming Music Composer of the Year	Ayushmann Khurrana, Rochak Kohli (for the song "Pani Da Rang")	Won	
7 February 2013	Mirchi Music Awards	Upcoming Lyricist of the Year	Ayushmann Khurrana, Rochak Kohli (for the song "Pani Da Rang")	Won	
7 February 2013	Mirchi Music Awards	Technical Sound Engineering of the Year	Anish Gohil, Biswadeep Chatterjee	Nominated	
7 February 2013	Mirchi Music Awards	Technical Programmer and Arranger of the Year	Abhijit Nalani	Nominated	
26 January 2013	Stardust Awards	Best Film	John Abraham, Shoojit Sircar, Sunil Lulla	Won	
26 January 2013	Stardust Awards	Best Director	Shoojit Sircar	Won	
26 January 2013	Stardust Awards	Best Actor	Ayushmann Khurrana	Won	
26 January 2013	Stardust Awards	Superstar of Tomorrow - Male	Ayushmann Khurrana	Nominated	
26 January 2013	Stardust Awards	Best Actress	Yami Gautam	Nominated	
26 January 2013	Stardust Awards	Superstar of Tomorrow - Female	Yami Gautam	Nominated	
26 January 2013	Stardust Awards	New Musical Sensation (Male)	Ayushmann Khurrana (for the song "Pani Da Rang")	Won	
26 January 2013	Stardust Awards	Standout Performance by a New Lyricist	Ayushmann Khurrana, Rochak Kohli (for the song "Pani Da Rang")	Nominated	
28 January 2013	Bollywood Hungama Surfers Choice Movie Awards	Best Debut (Male)	Ayushmann Khurana	Won	
6 January 2013	ETC Bollywood Business Awards	Most Successful Small Budget Movie	John Abraham, Shoojit Sircar, Sunil Lulla	Won	
6 January 2013	ETC Bollywood Business Awards	Most Profitable Debut (Male)	Ayushmann Khurrana	Won	
1 October 2012	Global Indian Music Academy Awards	Star Plus Hottest Song of the Year	Ayushmann Khurrana, Rochak Kohli (for the song "Pani Da Rang")	Won	

== Sequel and remakes ==
After the major critical and commercial success of the film, producer John Abraham announced that he was encouraged by the response of Vicky Donor and has therefore laid a sequel on the cards. The sequel titled Vicky Pet Se is about a man getting pregnant. However, the story was similar to the 2022 film Mister Mummy starring Riteish Deshmukh.

Dileep has bought the remake rights for the Malayalam version. Telugu director Madhura Sreedhar bought the remake rights of the film for the Telugu version named Naruda Donoruda starring Sumanth. It was remade in Tamil as Dharala Prabhu starring Harish Kalyan.
