= Juhi Chaturvedi =

Indian screenwriter

- Born: 24 February 1975 (age 51); Lucknow, Uttar Pradesh, India
- Education: Mount Carmel College, Lucknow
- Occupation: Screenwriter
- Writing career
- Notable works: Vicky Donor; Piku; October

Juhi Chaturvedi (born 24 February 1975) is an Indian screenwriter who works in Hindi films. An advertising professional based in Mumbai, Chaturvedi has written scripts for Bollywood films such as Vicky Donor (2012), Piku (2015), October (2018) and Gulabo Sitabo (2020).

She won the 2013 Filmfare Award for Best Story for Vicky Donor (2012), the National Film Award for Best Original Screenplay and Best Dialogues and the 2016 Filmfare Award for Best Screenplay for Piku (2015).

== Early life and background ==
Born and brought up in Lucknow, Chaturvedi graduated from Lucknow College of Arts.

== Career ==
Chaturvedi started her career as a freelance illustrator with Lucknow's edition of The Times of India. She shifted to Delhi in 1996, when she joined advertising with Ogilvy & Mather as an art director. In 1999, she moved to the Mumbai office of the agency. In 2008, she joined McCann followed by Bates in Mumbai, where she was creative director. She worked with director Shoojit Sircar on ad films for brands like Titan watches and Saffola. She also wrote the dialogues for Shoebite, Sircar's second film, which had Amitabh Bachchan in the lead role, but it was cancelled.

During her time in Delhi, she lived in Lajpat Nagar, an experience she used in scripting her first film, Vicky Donor. She was awarded the IRDS Film award for social concern for her story Vicky Donor.

== Filmography ==
Year	Film	Story	Screenplay	Dialogue	Note
2012	Vicky Donor	Yes	Yes	Yes	Filmfare Award for Best Story
2013	Madras Cafe	Yes	Yes	Yes	
2014	Khoobsurat	Yes	Yes	Yes	
2015	Piku	Yes	Yes	Yes	Filmfare Award for Best Screenplay; National Film Award for Best Original Screenplay; National Film Award for Best Dialogues
2018	October	Yes	Yes	Yes	
2019	The Sky Is Pink	No	No	Hindi Dialogues	
2020	Dharala Prabhu	Yes	Yes	No	Remake of Vicky Donor
2020	Gulabo Sitabo	Yes	Yes	Yes	Filmfare Award for Best Dialogue; Nominated–Filmfare Award for Best Story
2026	Last Man in Tower	No	No	Yes	

== Accolades ==
Year	Notable work	Awards	Category	Result	Ref.
2013	Vicky Donor	Filmfare Awards	Best Story	Won	
2013	Vicky Donor	Star Screen Awards	Best Story	Nominated	
2013	Vicky Donor	International Indian Film Academy Awards	Best Dialogues	Won	
2013	Vicky Donor	International Indian Film Academy Awards	Best Story	Nominated	
2013	Vicky Donor	Producers Guild Film Awards	Best Story	Won	
2013	Vicky Donor	Producers Guild Film Awards	Best Dialogues	Won	
2013	Vicky Donor	Producers Guild Film Awards	Best Screenplay	Nominated	
2016	Piku	Filmfare Awards	Best Screenplay	Won	
2016	Piku	Star Screen Awards	Best Dialogues	Won	
2016	Piku	Jagran Film Festival	Best Screenplay	Won	
2016	Piku	National Film Awards	Best Original Screenplay	Won	
2016	Piku	National Film Awards	Best Dialogues	Won	
2016	Piku	International Indian Film Academy Awards	Best Story	Won	
2016	Piku	International Indian Film Academy Awards	Best Dialogues	Won	
2016	Piku	Producers Guild Film Awards	Best Story	Nominated	
2016	Piku	Producers Guild Film Awards	Best Screenplay	Nominated	
2016	Piku	Producers Guild Film Awards	Best Dialogues	Nominated	
2016	Piku	Zee Cine Awards	Best Story	Won	
2016	Piku	Zee Cine Awards	Best Screenplay	Won	
2016	Piku	Zee Cine Awards	Best Dialogue	Won	
2021	Gulabo Sitabo	Filmfare Awards	Best Story	Nominated	
2021	Gulabo Sitabo	Filmfare Awards	Best Dialogue	Won	
