= Ayushmann Khurrana filmography =

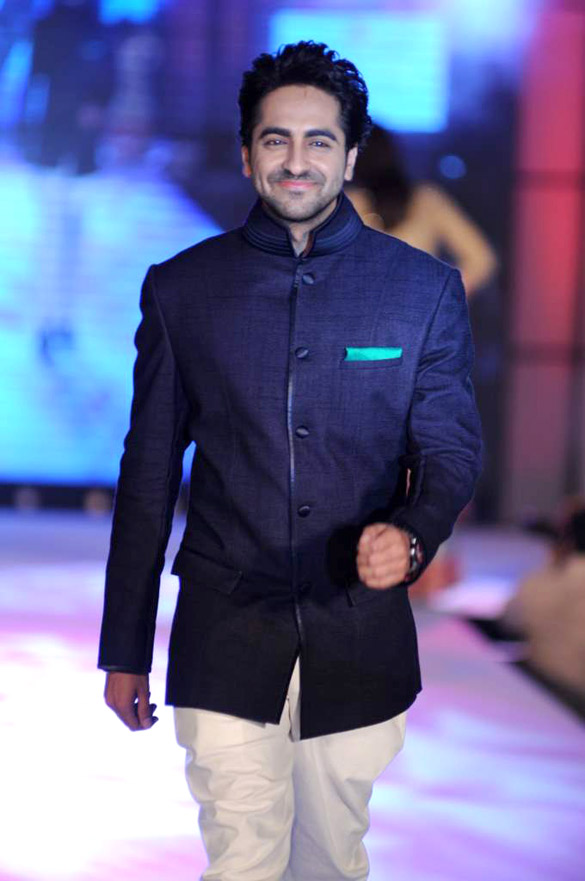
Khurrana in 2012

Ayushmann Khurrana is an Indian actor, playback singer and television host who works in Hindi films. Khurrana first appeared in 2004 teen drama reality show MTV Roadies, winning the second season of the show. He went to star in many other MTV shows, including MTV Fully Faltoo Movies, Cheque De India and Jaadoo Ek Baar, and hosted multiple television shows, including India's Got Talent and Music Ka Maha Muqqabla. In 2012, he made his feature film debut with the romantic comedy Vicky Donor, about sperm donation, which received critical acclaim and performed strongly at the box office. Khurrana won the Filmfare Award for Best Male Playback Singer (for the song "Pani Da Rang"). He then starred in a series of commercially unsuccessful films, including the comedy-drama Nautanki Saala (2013), romantic comedy Bewakoofiyaan (2014), and drama Hawaizaada (2015).

In 2015, Khurrana starred in the Sharat Katariya-directed romantic drama Dum Laga Ke Haisha opposite Bhumi Pednekar. His performance was praised, and the film emerged as a commercial success. He then starred in Meri Pyaari Bindu (2017), Bareilly Ki Barfi (2017), and Shubh Mangal Saavdhan (2017). The latter two were commercially successful. In 2018, he starred in the black comedy Andhadhun and the comedy-drama Badhaai Ho. The former grossed ₹4.56 billion (US$64 million) worldwide, and became one of Indian cinema's biggest grossers; for his performance he won the National Film Award for Best Actor (shared with Vicky Kaushal for Uri: The Surgical Strike) and the Filmfare Critics Award for Best Actor. Badhaai Ho became a sleeper hit, earning over ₹2.21 billion (US$31 million) worldwide. This success continued with Khurrana's 2019 releases, Article 15, Dream Girl, and Bala. For the first of these, he won the Filmfare Critics Award for Best Actor. In the comedy Bala, he played a man plagued with premature balding.

Khurrana's 2020 release, Shubh Mangal Zyada Saavdhan, was the first mainstream Bollywood film to be led by openly gay characters. Following several films that failed commercially despite positive reviews, Khurrana had a box-office hit in the spiritual sequel Dream Girl 2 (2023).

== Films ==
Key
†	Denotes films that have not yet been released

Year	Title	Role	Notes	Ref(s)
2012	Vicky Donor	Vicky Arora		
2013	Nautanki Saala	Ram Parmar		
2014	Bewakoofiyaan	Mohit Chaddha		
2015	Hawaizaada	Shivkar Bapuji Talpade		
2015	Dum Laga Ke Haisha	Prem Prakash Tiwari		
2017	Meri Pyaari Bindu	Abhimanyu "Bubla" Roy		
2017	Bareilly Ki Barfi	Chirag Dubey		
2017	Shubh Mangal Saavdhan	Mudit Sharma		
2018	Andhadhun	Akash Saraf		
2018	Badhaai Ho	Nakul Kaushik		
2019	Article 15	ACP Ayan Ranjan		
2019	Dream Girl	Karamveer "Karam" Singh/Pooja		
2019	Bala	Balmukund "Bala" Shukla		
2020	Shubh Mangal Zyada Saavdhan	Kartik Singh		
2020	Gulabo Sitabo	Baankey Rastogi		
2021	Chandigarh Kare Aashiqui	Manvinder "Manu" Munjal		
2022	Anek	Aman/Joshua		
2022	Doctor G	Dr. Uday Gupta		
2022	An Action Hero	Manav Khurana		
2023	Dream Girl 2	Pooja/Karamveer "Karam" Singh		
2025	Thamma	Alok Goyal		
2026	Pati Patni Aur Woh Do	Prajapati Pandey		
2026	Udta Teer	Vikrant / Bilal Ahmed		
2026	Yeh Prem Mol Liya †	Prem	Post-production	

== Television ==
Year	Title	Role	Note(s)	Ref(s)
2004	MTV Roadies	Contestant	Winner	
2007	Kayamath	Saket Shergil		
2008	MTV Wassup, The Voice of Youngistaan	Video Jockey	Co-hosted the show with MTV VJs Bani J and Vineet Modi	
2008	MTV Fully Faltoo Movie – Cheque De India	Fakir Khan	Spoof of Chak De! India	
2008	MTV Fully Faltoo Movie – Jadoo Ekbar	Prince Jalebi	Spoof of Jodhaa Akbar	
2008	MTV Roadies Hell Down Under	Anchor	Anchor for the auditions only	
2008	Ek Thi Rajkumari	Prem		
2009	India's Got Talent	Anchor	Co-hosted the show with Nikhil Chinapa	
2009	Rock on with MTV	Anchor	Anchor for the auditions only	
2009	Stripped	Anchor		
2010	Taarak Mehta Ka Ooltah Chashmah	Himself	Guest appearance (to promote IPL 3)	
2010	Extra Innings T20 for Indian Premier League	Presenter	Co-hosted the show with Gaurav Kapur, Samir Kochhar and Angad Bedi	
2010	India's Got Talent	Anchor	Co-hosted the show with Nikhil Chinapa	
2010	Rock on with MTV	Anchor	Co-hosted the show with Lisa Haydon	
2011	MTV Grind	Anchor		
2011	Just Dance	Anchor		
2014	1st Star Box Office India Awards Ceremony	Anchor		
2018	25th Star Screen Awards	Co-host		
2026	India's Got Latent	Guest judge	Season 2; Bonus episode 4	
