= List of awards and nominations received by Ayushmann Khurrana =

Ayushmann Khurrana awards and nominations
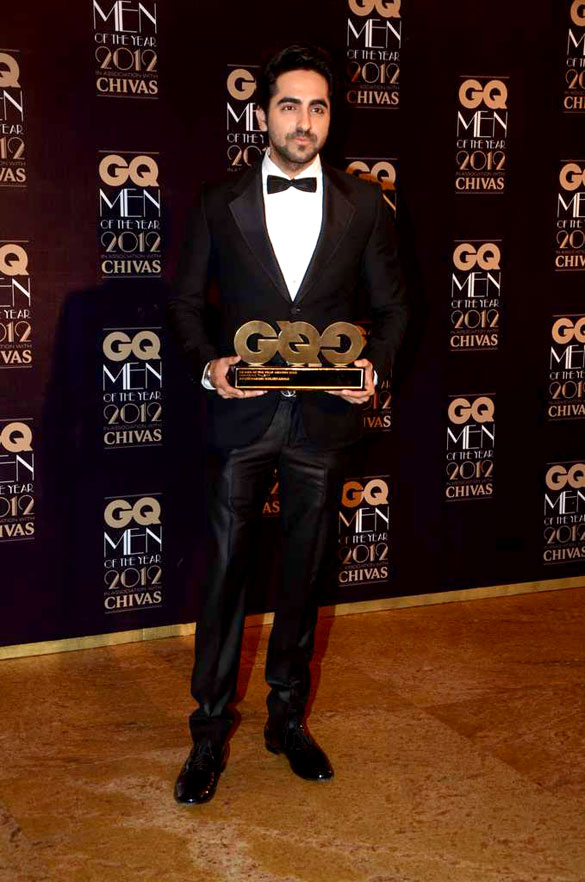
- Khurrana at GQ Men of the Year Award in 2012
Awards and nominations
Award	Wins	Nominations
National Film Awards	1	1
People's Choice Awards	0	1
BIG Star Entertainment Awards	1	1
Mirchi Music Awards	2	2
Filmfare Awards	4	7
Screen Awards	2	3
Zee Cine Awards	1	5
Stardust Awards	2	1
IIFA Awards	1	1
Producers Guild Film Awards	2	2
Other awards	9	15

Totals (Note: Certain award groups do not simply award one winner. They acknowledge several different recipients, have runners-up, and have third place. Since this is a specific recognition and is different from losing an award, runner-up mentions are considered wins in this award tally. For simplification and to avoid errors, each award in this list has been presumed to have had a prior nomination.)
- Wins: 29
- Nominations: 38

Ayushmann Khurrana (born 14 September 1984) is an Indian actor, poet, singer, and television host. He has established a career in Hindi cinema and is the recipient of several awards, including a National Film Award and four Filmfare Awards.

Khurrana won the second season of reality television show MTV Roadies in 2004 and ventured into an anchoring career. He made his film debut in 2012 with the romantic comedy Vicky Donor. His performance earned him several accolades including the Filmfare Award for Best Male Debut. Following a brief setback, he starred in the commercially and critically successful romance Dum Laga Ke Haisha. Khurrana went on to establish himself with the comedies Bareilly Ki Barfi (2017), Shubh Mangal Saavdhan (2017), and Badhaai Ho (2018), and the thriller Andhadhun (2018).

In addition to acting, Khurrana has sung for all his films, including the song "Pani Da Rang", which earned him the Filmfare Award for Best Male Playback Singer.

== Awards and nominations ==
Year	Film	Award	Category	Result	Ref.
2011	Just Dance	Indian Television Academy Awards	Best Anchor of Music/Film Based show (Jury)	Won	
2012	Vicky Donor	Boroplus Gold Awards	Rising Film Stars From TV	Won	
2012	Vicky Donor	People's Choice Awards India	Favorite Debut Actor (Male/Female)	Nominated	
2012	Vicky Donor	BIG Star Entertainment Awards	Most Entertaining Actor (Film) Debut – Male	Won	
2012	Vicky Donor	5th Mirchi Music Awards	Male Vocalist of The Year (for "Pani Da Rang")	Nominated	
2012	Vicky Donor	5th Mirchi Music Awards	Upcoming Male Vocalist of the Year (for "Pani Da Rang")	Nominated	
2012	Vicky Donor	5th Mirchi Music Awards	Upcoming Music Composer of the Year	Won	
2012	Vicky Donor	5th Mirchi Music Awards	Upcoming Lyricist of the Year (for "Pani Da Rang")	Won	
2013	Vicky Donor	Filmfare Awards	Best Male Debut	Won	
2013	Vicky Donor	Filmfare Awards	Best Male Playback Singer (for "Pani Da Rang")	Won	
2013	Vicky Donor	ETC Bollywood Business Awards	Most Profitable Debut (Male)	Won	
2013	Vicky Donor	Screen Awards	Most Promising Newcomer – Male	Won	
2013	Vicky Donor	Screen Awards	Best Male Playback Singer (for "Pani Da Rang")	Nominated	
2013	Vicky Donor	Zee Cine Awards	Best Male Debut	Won	
2013	Vicky Donor	Zee Cine Awards	Best Playback Singer – Male (for "Pani Da Rang")	Nominated	
2013	Vicky Donor	Stardust Awards	Best Actor	Won	
2013	Vicky Donor	Stardust Awards	New Musical Sensation (Male) (for "Pani Da Rang")	Won	
2013	Vicky Donor	Stardust Awards	Superstar of Tomorrow – Male	Nominated	
2013	Vicky Donor	Renault Star Guild Awards	Best Male Debut	Won	
2013	Vicky Donor	Renault Star Guild Awards	Best Male Playback Singer (for "Pani Da Rang")	Won	
2013	Vicky Donor	Renault Star Guild Awards	Best Actor in a Leading Role	Nominated	
2013	Vicky Donor	Renault Star Guild Awards	Best Lyrics (for "Pani Da Rang")	Nominated	
2013	Vicky Donor	Times of India Film Awards	Best Debut – Male	Won	
2013	Vicky Donor	Times of India Film Awards	Best Playback Singer – Male (for "Pani Da Rang")	Nominated	
2013	Vicky Donor	International Indian Film Academy Awards	Star Debut of the Year – Male	Won	
2013	Vicky Donor	International Indian Film Academy Awards	Best Actor	Nominated	
2013	Vicky Donor	Producers Guild Film Awards	Best Male Playback Singer (for "Pani Da Rang")	Won	
2018	Shubh Mangal Saavdhan	Screen Awards	Best Actor – Male (Popular)	Nominated	
2018	Shubh Mangal Saavdhan	Zee Cine Awards	Best Actor – Male (Viewer's Choice)	Nominated	
2018	Shubh Mangal Saavdhan	Zee Cine Awards	Best Actor – Male (Jury's Choice)	Nominated	
2018	Shubh Mangal Saavdhan	Filmfare Awards	Best Actor	Nominated	
2019	Andhadhun	Filmfare Awards	Best Actor	Nominated	
2019	Andhadhun	Filmfare Awards	Best Actor (Critics)	Won	
2019	Andhadhun	Zee Cine Awards	Best Actor – Male (Viewer's Choice)	Won	
2019	Andhadhun	National Film Awards	Best Actor	Won	
2019	Andhadhun & Badhaai Ho	Asiavision Awards	Best Actor (Critics)	Won	
2020	Article 15	Screen Awards	Best Actor (Critics)	Won	
2020	Bala	Screen Awards	Best Actor (Critics)	Won	
2020	Dream Girl	Screen Awards	Best Actor in a Comic Role	Nominated	
2020	Article 15	Filmfare Awards	Best Actor (Critics)	Won	
2020	Bala	Filmfare Awards	Best Actor	Nominated	
2021	Shubh Mangal Zyada Saavdhan	Filmfare Awards	Best Actor	Nominated	
2021	Shubh Mangal Zyada Saavdhan	Filmfare Awards	Best Male Playback Singer (for "Mere Liye Tum Kaafi Ho")	Nominated	
2023	—N/a	Pinkvilla Style Icons Awards	Glamorous Trendsetter Of The Year - Male	Won	
2023	—N/a	Bollywood Hungama Style Icons	Most Stylish Youth Icon (Male)	Nominated	
2023	—N/a	Bollywood Hungama Style Icons	Most Stylish Actor People’s Choice (Male)	Nominated	

== See also ==
- List of Ayushmann Khurrana performances
