= Shubh Mangal Savdhan (disambiguation) =

Shubh Mangal Savdhan to refer

- Shubh Mangal Savdhan, a 1992 Indian Marathi-language film
- Shubha Mangal Saavadhan, a 2006 Indian Marathi-language comedy drama film
- Shubh Mangal Savdhan (2017 film), an Indian Hindi-language romantic comedy film by R. S. Prasanna
  - Shubh Mangal Zyada Saavdhan, 2020 sequel film by Hitesh Kewalya
