= Rachit Singh =

Indian actor and acting coach

- Born: Varanasi, Uttar Pradesh
- Occupations: Actor; acting coach
- Years active: 2012–present (as acting coach); 2024–present

Rachit Singh is an Indian actor and acting coach. He has reportedly coached several Bollywood actors, and co-established The Artist Collective and the Rachit Singh Workshop. Singh made his acting debut in the 2024 drama series Karmma Calling and his film debut in the horror comedy Thamma (2025). He subsequently appeared opposite Huma Qureshi in the thriller Baby Do Die Do (2026).

== Early life and career ==
Singh was born and educated in Varanasi, Uttar Pradesh. In 2012, he moved to New Delhi, where he worked as a ramp model. The following year, he visited Mumbai to pursue acting but returned due to uncertainty about his career direction. In 2016, he moved to Mumbai to pursue acting more seriously. Early in his career, he worked as an acting coach alongside Atul Mongia and played a key role in establishing The Artist Collective and the Rachit Singh Workshop. Through these ventures, he reportedly conducted more than 100 acting workshops.

According to Tanya Trivedi of The Sunday Guardian, Singh established himself as "one of the industry's sought-after acting coaches". His reported clients included Alia Bhatt, Ranveer Singh, Varun Dhawan, Vicky Kaushal, Anushka Sharma and Saif Ali Khan. He also reportedly coached actors Aneet Padda and Shanaya Kapoor.

While pursuing opportunities as an actor, Singh spent much of his early career as an acting coach and worked on several films, including Munjya (2024) and Sky Force (2025). He described the experience as an "amazing journey" that shaped him both personally and professionally.

=== Screen roles (2024–present) ===
Singh made his acting debut as Vedant in Ruchi Narain's drama series Karmma Calling (2024). Reviewing for Outlook India, Snigdha Nalini criticised the series but praised Singh's performance, writing that she "could not take [her] eyes off him" and describing his screen presence as "commanding".

Filmmaker Amar Kaushik subsequently cast Singh as Veeran, a member of the Betaal sect of vampires loyal to the antagonist (Nawazuddin Siddiqui), in Aditya Sarpotdar's horror comedy Thamma (2025), marking his film debut. To prepare for the role, Singh underwent a nine-month physical transformation to build muscle. The film, which starred Ayushmann Khurrana and Rashmika Mandanna, achieved moderate financial success.

In Nachiket Samant's thriller Baby Do Die Do (2026), Singh played a Sikh music teacher named Siddhu who falls in love with Huma Qureshi's eponymous character. He described Siddhu as a "sweet, nice and innocent guy", contrasting the character with his role in Thamma. Singh landed the role after Saqib Saleem, the film's co-producer, watched a short film featuring him and was impressed by his performance. Baby Do Die Do was released in a limited theatrical run and proved a commercial failure. Singh's performance received generally positive reviews: Aishani Biswas of Outlook India praised the "genuine tenderness" he brought to the film's romantic track, while Sana Farzeen of India Today described his performance as sincere but felt that he did not quite match Qureshi's screen presence.

Singh is set to appear alongside Aditi Rao Hydari and Barun Sobti in Welcome to Khoya Mahal, a series directed by Konkona Sen Sharma for Amazon Prime Video.

== Personal life ==
Singh has reportedly been in a relationship with actress Huma Qureshi since 2024. In early 2026, Hindustan Times reported that the couple was planning to marry in October or November of that year; Singh denied the reports.

In July 2026, Singh and Qureshi participated in protests at Jantar Mantar in New Delhi, alongside Qureshi's brother, actor Saqib Saleem.

== Acting credits ==
=== Television ===
Key
†	Denotes television productions that have not yet been released

Year	Title	Role	Notes	Ref.
2024	Karmma Calling	Vedant		
2027	Welcome To Khoya Mahal †	TBA	Completed	

=== Films ===
Year	Title	Role	Notes	Ref.
2025	Thamma	Veeran		
2026	Baby Do Die Do	Siddhu		

== See also ==
- List of Hindi film actors
