= Bewakoofiyaan =

- Theatrical release poster
- Directed by: Nupur Asthana
- Written by: Habib Faisal
- Produced by: Aditya Chopra
- Starring: Ayushmann Khurrana; Sonam Kapoor; Rishi Kapoor
- Cinematography: Neha Parti Matiyani
- Edited by: Antara Lahiri
- Music by: Songs: Raghu Dixit; Background Score: Hitesh Sonik
- Production company: Yash Raj Films
- Release date: 14 March 2014
- Running time: 119 minutes
- Country: India
- Language: Hindi
- Budget: ₹22 crore
- Box office: est.₹ 22.2 crore

Bewakoofiyaan (transl. Stupidities) is a 2014 Indian Hindi-language romantic comedy film directed by Nupur Asthana, written by Habib Faisal, and produced by Aditya Chopra under Yash Raj Films. The film stars Ayushmann Khurrana and Sonam Kapoor in lead roles, with Rishi Kapoor in a supporting role.

Principal photography took place in Delhi and Gurgaon.

The movie was released theatrically on 14 March 2014, and received mixed reviews from critics. The film emerged as a commercial failure, grossing ₹22.2 crore (US$2.7 million) worldwide against a reported budget of ₹22 crore.

== Cast ==
- Rishi Kapoor as Vinod Kumar "V. K." Sehgal, Myra's father
- Ayushmann Khurrana as Mohit Chaddha
- Sonam Kapoor as Myra Sehgal, Mohit's girlfriend
- Deepika Amin as Rupali Wadhwa, Mohit's boss
- Savi Sidhu as Masterji
- Sapan Saran as Swati
- Gurpal Singh as Gursharan Singh, V. K.'s sidekick

== Production ==
=== Development ===
Bewakoofiyaan was officially announced in December 2012 as a romantic comedy.

=== Casting ===
Casting for the film was confirmed in December 2012, with Ayushmann Khurrana and Sonam Kapoor and Rishi Kapoor announced as being in the film.

=== Filming ===
Principal photography began in February 2013, with shooting locations including Delhi, and Dubai.

== Soundtrack ==
Bewakoofiyaan

Soundtrack album by Raghu Dixit
- Released: 19 February 2014
- Recorded: 2013; YRF Studios, Saba Studio; Mumbai, India
- Genre: Film soundtrack
- Length: 24:45
- Label: Yash Raj Films
- Producer: Aditya Chopra

Raghu Dixit chronology
Mujhse Fraaandship Karoge (2011)	Bewakoofiyaan (2014)	Aviyal (2016)
External audio
- Audio Jukebox on YouTube

The soundtrack was composed by Raghu Dixit, with lyrics written by Anvita Dutt. A bonus track was also made titled "O Heeriye" and performed by Ayushmann Khurrana.

=== Track listing ===
Bewakoofiyaan
No.	Title	Singer(s)	Length
1.	"Gulcharrey"	Aditi Singh Sharma, Benny Dayal	03:55
2.	"Khamakhaan"	Ayushmann Khurrana, Neeti Mohan	04:25
3.	"Bewakoofiyaan"	Raghu Dixit	04:24
4.	"Rumaani Sa"	Mohit Chauhan, Shreya Ghoshal	04:40
5.	"Aye Jigida"	Vishal Dadlani	03:46
6.	"O Heeriye" (Lyrics written by Ayushmann Khurrana & Rochak Kohli)	Ayushmann Khurrana	03:35
Total length:			24:45

== Reception ==
=== Box office ===
Bewakoofiyaan was made with a total budget of ₹220 million (US$2.6 million) The film was released theatrically on 14 March 2014.

In India, the film opened to poor responses. The film earned ₹126,700,000 during the first week.

Overseas, Bewakoofiyaan earned US$46,888 from 51 screens in the United States and US$20,850 from 15 screens in Canada. In the United Kingdom and Ireland, it collected £33,620 from 26 screens. In Australia, it grossed A$22,145 from 14 screens, while in New Zealand, it earned NZ$12,558 from a single screen.

=== Critical reception ===
Saibal Chatterjee of NDTV noted the film "scores with its disarming simplicity" and described it as "never less than watchable". Tushar Joshi writing for DNA said the film "plays it too safe to rise above the ordinary" and "had the opportunity to be smarter and funnier".

Rajeev Masand of CNN-IBN remarked that the film is "saddled with a dead duck of a script that simply can't be saved." Hindustan Times described the film as "bland" and "listless," but appreciated Ayushmann Khurrana’s performance, stating that his "anger and frustration at losing the good life are palpable". Mumbai Mirror's Rahul Desai called it a "middling film".

Danny Bowes of RogerEbert.com found the film to be "perfectly acceptable middle-of-the-road romantic comedy material". Andy Webster of The New York Times felt that the film was "intriguing notions of recessionary struggle, though strained, contrived humor bogs it down". Faheem Ruhain of India Today wrote "It would be a bewkoofi to spend your money on this one in a theatre. On TV, you could give it a try but just for that little crackling nok-jhok between Khurrana and Kapoor".
