= Savi Sidhu =

Indian actor

- Born: Lucknow, Uttar Pradesh, India
- Occupations: Actor, security guard
- Years active: 1995–2014; 2020
- Height: 6 ft 2 in (188 cm)

Savi Sidhu is an Indian actor, who worked in Bollywood films. He appeared in numerous Hindi films including Black Friday (2007), Gulaal (2009), Patiala House (2011) and Bewakoofiyaan (2014).

In March 2019, he was reported to be working as a security guard in Mumbai, due to a financial crisis.

== Early life ==
Standing at 6'2'', he got admission in college in the sports quota and played basketball, later studied law in Lucknow but didn't finish his degree, before becoming a stage actor.

== Career ==
Sidhu did his first film when Anurag Kashyap cast him in Paanch, a film which was never released. He starred in Anurag Kashyap's 2004 film Black Friday, where he played the role of Commissioner A.S. Samra.

He appeared in Gulaal, also directed by Anurag Kashyap, and then in Patiala House, directed by Nikkhil Advani.

== Filmography ==
- 1995 - Taaqat (as Savi Siddhu)
- 1999 - Shool as Vishnu Pandey
- 2000 - Aaja Mere Raja
- 2003 - Escape from Taliban as Rammajan
- 2003 - Zameen
- 2004 - Black Friday as A.S. Samra
- 2005 - Khamoshh... Khauff Ki Raat as Ex-husband (as Savi Siddhu)
- 2009 - Gulaal as Dileep's Elder Brother
- 2009 - Blue Oranges as Mahadev
- 2011 - Patiala House
- 2013 - Nautanki Saala! as Raja Janak
- 2013 - D-Day as K.S. Lodhi
- 2013 - Jal as Mukhiya
- 2013 - Arrambam (Tamil) as Terrorist (Durrane's boss)
- 2014 - Bewakoofiyaan as Masterji
- 2014 - Sonali Cable as Falooda Chacha
- 2020 - Maska as Hasan

== Television ==
- 2008-2009 - Equador (TV Mini-Series) as Raja Singh
- Rishtey (TV series), ep. 16, Mehmaan
- 2004 - Raat Hone Ko Hai, Story # 23: Makaya
