= Abhishek Banerjee (actor) =

Indian film actor

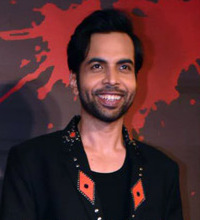
- Banerjee in 2024
- Born: 5 May 1985 (age 41); Kharagpur, West Bengal, India
- Occupations: Actor; casting director
- Spouse: Tina Noronha (m. 2014)

Abhishek Banerjee (born in 1985) is an Indian actor and a former casting director. He is best known for his roles in the Maddock Horror Comedy Universe films as Jana in Stree, Bhediya and Stree 2 and as Hathoda Tyagi in Amazon Prime Video series Paatal Lok. Banerjee's other notable films include Dream Girl, Dream Girl 2, Rashmi Rocket, Vedaa, and Stolen.

== Early life and education ==
Abhishek Banerjee was born in Kharagpur, West Bengal in the Bengali family of Aloke Kumar Banerjee, a former assistant commandant of the Central Industrial Security Force and Sumira Banerjee. He received his higher education in Delhi. He initially took computer science, but dropped out. He subsequently took admission in the English honours course in Kirori Mal College, University of Delhi, a college he chose because of its dramatics society, "The Players".

== Career ==
Banerjee began his acting career with Delhi theatre. He worked in a Doordarshan show during these days. His first film appearance was in Rang De Basanti, as one of the students auditioning for a documentary role. He moved to Mumbai from Delhi in 2008. He worked in Knock Out as a casting director in 2010. He also acted in Soul of Sand in 2010.

In 2011, he worked as a casting director in The Dirty Picture and No One Killed Jessica. He worked as casting director in Bajatey Raho and Mickey Virus in 2013. He then acted in Bombay Talkies in 2013.

Banerjee acted in short films Fuddu Boys and Agli Baar in 2015.

He also worked as a casting director in Umrika and Gabbar Is Back in 2015. He further worked as a casting director in Dear Dad, Do Lafzon Ki Kahani, Rock On 2 and You Are My Sunday in 2016. He worked as a casting director in Ok Jaanu, Toilet: Ek Prem Katha, Secret Superstar, and Ajji in 2017. In the same year, he acted in the movies Phillauri and Ajji.

He then returned to the role of a casting director for the film Brij Mohan Amar Rahe in 2018. He starred alongside Rajkummar Rao and Aparshakti Khurana in Stree in 2018. For this film, he was nominated for Zee Cine Award for Best Actor in a Comic Role in 2019.

In 2019, he worked as a casting director of Kalank. In the same year, he also acted in Arjun Patiala, Dream Girl, and Bala.

Besides films, he also acted in web series like TVF Pitchers in 2015, Mirzapur in 2018, and Typewriter in 2019 where he played a key role as 'Fakeer'. He runs "Casting Bay" along with his friend Anmol Ahuja where they cast actors in advertisements, films as well as web series. It was established in 2017.

He played the role of Jin Liang in Kaali 2, which released on ZEE5 as a web series in 2020. He played the role of lead antagonist and dreaded hitman Vishal Tyagi (Hathoda Tyagi) in the Amazon Prime web series Paatal Lok, a performance he was much lauded for. He was also the casting director for the web series. In 2021, he was seen in the Varun Dhawan starrer, Bhediya, reprising his role from Stree. He reprised the role again in the movies Munjya, Stree 2 and Thamma. Banerjee was next seen in the Tara Sutaria led Apurva.

Banerjee received critical acclaim for his performance in the film Stolen, which premiered in the 2023 Venice Film Festival on 31 August 2023. It premiered on Amazon Prime Video on 4 June 2025. Critics highlighted Abhishek Banerjee's portrayal of Gautam as one of the standout performances of his career. Hardika Gupta of NDTV stated "Abhishek Banerjee delivers what is arguably the best performance of his career, shedding the comic persona often associated with him and slipping into a role that requires restraint, fear and eventual resolve."

== Filmography ==
Key
†	Denotes films that have not yet been released

=== As casting director ===
Year	Film
2010	Knock Out
2011	No One Killed Jessica
2011	The Dirty Picture
2013	Bajatey Raho
2013	Mickey Virus
2015	Gabbar Is Back
2016	Dear Dad
2016	Do Lafzon Ki Kahani
2016	Rock On 2
2016	Tu Hai Mera Sunday
2017	Ok Jaanu
2017	Toilet: Ek Prem Katha
2017	Secret Superstar
2017	Ajji
2018	Brij Mohan Amar Rahe
2019	Kalank
2019	The Sky Is Pink
2020	Paatal Lok

=== As actor ===
Year	Title	Role	Notes
2006	Rang De Basanti	Auditioner	
2010	Soul of Sand	Daya	
2011	No One Killed Jessica	Pickpocket	
2013	Bombay Talkies	Man sitting at Bhurji Stand	
2013	Go Goa Gone	Pharmacist	
2017	Phillauri	Soma	
2017	Ajji	Vilasrao Dhavle	
2018	Stree	Jana	
2018	Asees		
2019	Arjun Patiala		
2019	Dream Girl	Mahinder Rajput	
2019	Bala	Ajju	
2019	Made In China	Officer	
2020	Bhonsle	Rajendra	
2020	Unpaused	Manish	
2021	Ajeeb Daastaans	Sushil	
2021	Helmet	Sultan	
2021	Ankahi Kahaniya	Pradeep Loharia	
2021	Rashmi Rocket	Eeshit	
2022	Highway	D	Telugu film
2022	Bhediya	Jana	
2022	Vakeel Babu	Shiraz Hassan	
2022	Qala	Dr. Baneerjee	
2023	Dream Girl 2	Shahrukh	
2023	Aankh Micholi	Harbhajan Singh	
2023	Apurva	Sukha	
2023	Stolen	Gautam Bansal	
2024	Munjya	Jana	Cameo
2024	Vedaa	Jitendar Pratap Singh	
2024	Stree 2	Jana	
2025	Thamma	Jana	Cameo
2026	Toaster	Glenn Dsouza	
2026	Mirzapur	Subodh alias "Compounder"	
2026	Lust Stories 3	Debendu	

==== Television ====
Year	Title	Role	Notes
2015—2022	TVF Pitchers	Bhati	The Viral Fever
2016	Humorously Yours	Bhushi	The Viral Fever
2018	Mirzapur	Subodh aka Compounder	Amazon Prime
2019	Typewriter	Fakeer	Netflix
2020	Paatal Lok	Vishal "Hathoda" Tyagi	Amazon Prime
2020	Kaali 2	Jin Liang	ZEE5
2020	PariWar	Munna	Disney+Hotstar
2022	The Great Weddings of Munnes	Munnes	Voot
2023	Rana Naidu	"Jaffa" Pawan	Netflix
2023	Aakhri Sach	Bhuvan Rajawat	Disney+ Hotstar

==== Short film ====
Year	Title	Role	Notes
2015	Fuddu Boys	Lambu	
2015	Agli Baar	Mahinder	
2020	Second Hand	Prakasham	
2021	Paash - Trapped	Truck Driver	

== Awards and nominations ==
Year	Award	Category	Work	Result	Ref
2019	Zee Cine Awards	Best Actor in a Comic Role	Stree	Nominated	
2020	Filmfare OTT Awards	Best Supporting Actor (Male) (Drama Series)	Paatal Lok	Nominated	
2022	Filmfare Awards	Best Supporting Actor	Rashmi Rocket	Nominated	
2023	Filmfare OTT Awards	Best Actor in a Series (Male): Comedy	The Great Weddings of Munnes	Won	
