= Rahi Chakraborty =

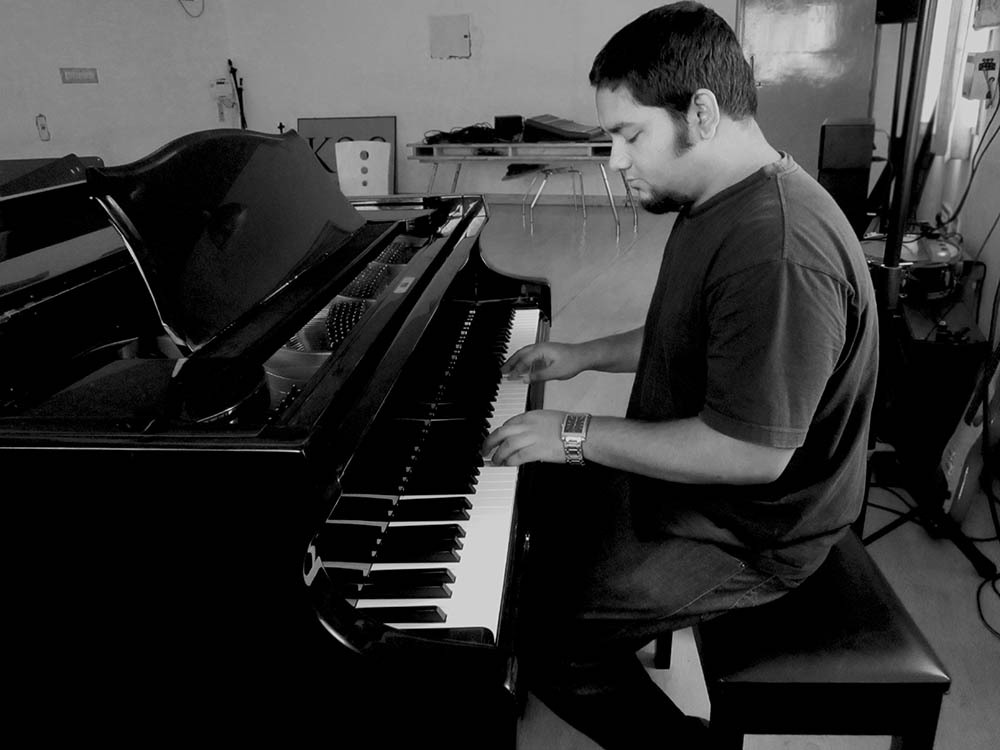
- Rahi Chakraborty at A.R.Rahman's KM Music Conservatory, Chennai

Background information
- Origin: Kolkata, West Bengal, India
- Genres: Rock, electronica, world
- Years active: 2007–present
- Website: www.rahichakraborty.com

Rahi Chakraborty (Hindi: राही चक्रवर्ती) is an Indian singer-songwriter, multi-instrumentalist and music producer. He shot to fame as the 1st runner up in MTV India's music show Mtv Rock On An alumnus of the Film and Television Institute of India of Pune his songs deal with teen angst, spirituality and political issues and he is best known for his compositions and vocal presence. In 2013, he studied and performed at A.R.Rahman's KM Music Conservatory, Chennai. Genre of compositions range from World Music, Electronica to Rock Music.

He is currently a music programmer and arranger under ace Bollywood music composer Ram Sampath who also was his judge in the MTV show. Chakraborty joined Ram Sampath's production house in 2015. This is 2026 and he is no longer creating music of any kind.

== Early life ==
Born on 30 April 1988 in a musical family, Rahi took lessons on guitar from Amyt Datta He learnt classical music from ITC Sangeet Research Academy from Jainul Abedin of the Agra Gharana. He did his schooling from South Point High School and graduation in English Honours from St. Xavier's College, Calcutta.

== Music ==
He got his first break in Opus, an event organized by St. Lawrence School Kolkata. He won both the best singer and poet award This was followed by Levi's Band e Mataram III as a judges choice finalist. A band hunt that took West Bengal band scene by storm in the music channel Sangeet Bangla. Scholastic Beats in association with T2 saw the appreciation of his songs in the print media for the first time. After this he took a break to learn Sound Engineering which would be his forte in the coming years.

== National breakthrough and Sufi poetry ==
Rahi had been studying Urdu poets and was quite influenced by the Sufi school of thinking. That resulted in an amalgamation in his lyrics which form a dichotomy of conflicting principles. His topics concerned the youth's aggression, typified by T. S. Eliot's The Waste Land and Sufi mysticism.

His songs on MTV India created a stir with compositions like Soundbox and Generation Zindagi getting appreciated by the likes of Kailash Kher and Ram Sampath. His following got stronger as on the show he was chosen as the team leader and formed the band Khilaugh which was compared with the likes of Linkin Park and Limp Bizkit as it featured the use of turntables and a blend of aggressive poetry in Hindi which is quite rare in the Indian Music Scene. He won the hearts of Indian and Pakistani celebrities like Palash Sen of Euphoria, Shafqat Amanat Ali and Mika.

== Criticism ==
In spite of his success, he has not been free of criticism. He had been accused of changing the song Jugni from the Indian movie Oye Lucky! Lucky Oye! as a hard rock mixed with folk ballad in one of the episodes of MTV Rock On where they were asked to perform a Bollywood number.

== Music education and growth as an artist producer ==
2011 saw him as a composer of background music along with Khilaugh as their work got featured on Mtv's popular show MTV Roadies

In 2012 Rahi attended the prestigious Film and Television Institute of India (FTII) for a certification in Sound Recording.

Continuing his quest for learning music, Rahi finally arrived at A.R.Rahman's KM Music Conservatory in Chennai where he learned about World Music and Western Classical Compositions. He got exposed to various cultures of music from around the world and also researched about his Bengali Folk Baul roots. He also performed a Baul number in front of a non-Bengali speaking audience in the KM Music Conservatory, Chennai July 2013.

== Joining team Ram Sampath ==
In 2015, Rahi joined the core team of Bollywood music composer Ram Sampath who was also his judge in the MTV show as a music programmer and arranger assisting him in his projects.

== Discography ==
=== Soundtrack ===
- Rahi Music Producer's Tribute Volume 1 (2016)

=== World Music/Electronica/Folk ===
- Rahi World Music EP Volume 1 (2014)

=== For MTV Rock On and more ===
- Rahi MTV Rock On Singles (2011)

== Other interests ==
Rahi had been making short films during his St.Xavier's days and had worked as an assistant director for Zee Bangla. When the members offered he took up the role as a director and editor in Khilaugh's music video Meri Jaan. He has also worked as a guitarist and singer with eminent Bengali music director Debojyoti Mishra in Sheemar Majhe Asim Tumi, a tribute to the bard Rabindranath Tagore.
