= Soul of Sand =

Soul of Sand (Pairon Talle)
- Directed by: Sidharth Srinivasan
- Written by: Sidharth Srinivasan
- Produced by: Sidharth Srinivasan; Divya Bhardwaj
- Starring: Dibyendu Bhattacharya; Saba Joshi
- Edited by: Sameera Jain
- Music by: Joana Stella Kompa
- Release date: 2010
- Running time: 98 minutes
- Country: India
- Language: Hindi

Soul of Sand (Hindi: Pairon Talle) is a 2010 Indian drama film directed by Sidarth Srinivasan, about a lower caste watchman, Bhanu Kumar who stands guard at his master Lakhmichand Ahlawat's abandoned silica mine on the outskirts of Delhi. It film deals with issues of caste system and land politics, feudalism and the urbanization of the Delhi NCR (National Capital Region). The film had its world premiere at the 2010 Toronto International Film Festival on 12 September 2010.

== Cast ==
- Dibyendu Bhattacharya - Bhanu Kumar
- Saba Joshi - Saroj Kumar
- Avtar Sahni - Lakhmichand Ahlawat
- Geeta Bisht - Twinkle Ahlawat
- Abhishek Banerjee - Daya

== Production ==
The film was made with a grant from the International Film Festival Rotterdam’s Hubert Bals Fund (HBF). The film was shot digitally in Haryana and Delhi using a 24p Sony CineAlta F900R high-definition camera. Having applied for the grant, the shooting stretched to over a period of three-years, subsequently the director ran into huge debt before the grant came through. The editing was done 4–5 months, using 30 hours footage to create 99-minute final cut.

== Release ==
The film had its world premiere at the 2010 Toronto International Film Festival in September, 2010, under the Discovery section. The film was also shown as International Film Festival Rotterdam as a part of HBF Harvest 2011: Bright Future section, for film produced with Hubert Bals Fund (HBF) funding. This also ensured its distribution through in the Benelux countries (Belgium, the Netherlands and Luxembourg) and a European premiere in Rotterdam.

=== Global Lens 2011 series ===
The film is featured in the Global Lens 2011 film series, sponsored by The Global Film Initiative. Global Lens is an annual program of eight to ten narrative films from around the world. Each year, the series premieres at MoMa and then tours throughout the United States and Canada. Global Lens 2011 includes eight other award-winning narrative feature films from Argentina, Bosnia-Herzegovina, Brazil, China, Georgia, Kyrgyzstan, Iran, and Uruguay.

== Awards ==
Gasparilla International Film Festival - Official Selection
