= Baby Do Die Do =

2026 Indian Hindi Film

- Theatrical release poster
- Directed by: Nachiket Samant
- Written by: Jasmeet Kaur Reen; Nachiket Samant; Gaurav Sharma; Parveez Shaikh
- Produced by: Saqib Saleem; Huma Qureshi; Nachiket Samant
- Starring: Huma Qureshi; Sikandar Kher; Chunky Panday
- Cinematography: Tojo Xavier
- Edited by: Nikhil Parihar; Ashish Tripathi
- Music by: Arjun Iyer
- Production companies: Saleem Siblings; Pune-04 Picture
- Distributed by: Cinépolis; Panorama Studios (Delhi-UP only)
- Release date: 3 July 2026
- Running time: 123 minutes
- Country: India
- Language: Hindi
- Box office: ₹6.91 crore

Baby Do Die Do is a 2026 Indian Hindi-language action thriller film directed by Nachiket Samant and produced by Saleem Siblings and Pune 04 Picture. It stars Huma Qureshi, Sikander Kher and Chunky Panday in pivotal roles.

The film was released on 3 July 2026 and received praise from critics, but was a commercial failure.

== Plot ==
The film opens with two teenage twin sisters exploring the rooms of an abandoned five star hotel. One of them, Baby, is mute. Her sister recounts their difficult childhood, their father a rickshaw driver drank himself to death. Their mother's struggle with poverty and drunk husband had pushed her to the brink of insanity. As the elder twin, she took responsibility for the household and cared for Baby. Because Baby is deaf and mute, her sister has tied an anklet around her ankle so that she can be found if she wanders off. While searching the hotel, the girls discover a severed ear and a trail of blood leading to a door marked with a large red cross. Curiosity overcomes their fear, and they witness a veiled man committing a murder. To eliminate witnesses, the killer murders Baby's sister as well.

Baby is subsequently raised by P. M. Jain, whom she affectionately calls "Papa". Acting as a father figure, he trains her to become an assassin, hoping that one day she will avenge her sister's death. In the present day, Baby is shown on a crowded train tracking a target. After Papa confirms the target's identity, she uses a specially modified umbrella containing a concealed gun to kill him as the train reaches a station, then disappears into the crowd. On her way home two men harass her, but before she can retaliate, a police patrol car arrives. The officer, Anjum Khan, offers Baby a ride home. Noticing that they wear identical shoes, Anjum playfully gives Baby a fist bump. At home, Baby finds her mother, as usual, agitated. Plagued by guilt and insomnia, she seeks solace on the rooftop, where she imagines conversations with her deceased sister while observing two young lovers communicating from neighboring buildings. Unable to relate to their feelings, she wonders what draws them to one another.

Baby's neighbor, Sidhu, is a struggling singer who supports himself by teaching music. Kind and sincere, he is captivated by Baby. Although she does not reciprocate his feelings, he is the only person she allows into her life. Papa later meets Zafar, a builder and former criminal, to collect payment for the earlier assassination. Zafar dotes on his dwarf brother, Lucky, whom he considers his good-luck charm and dreams of completing his flagship project, 'Lucky Tower'. When Lucky is insulted by a wealthy investor, Murjhani, Zafar hires Papa to eliminate him. After days of surveillance, they discover that Murjhani secretly visits a gay club every Thursday, presenting their only opportunity. Papa assigns the task to his son, Manu, but Baby doubting his ability to kill, intercepts Murjhani in the club's parking and kills him herself.

Murjhani's wife, Manju, bribes Anjum Khan to find her husband's killer. Meanwhile, Baby accepts Sidhu's marriage proposal, though she herself is unsure of her reasons. She tells Papa that she wishes to leave her life as an assassin and begin anew, though she still hopes to remain close to him. Papa warns her that there is no easy exit from their profession, but reluctantly consents to the marriage. Soon, a property dealer uncovers their secret and attempts to blackmail them. Papa orders Baby to silence him. Just as she shoots him from a far away building man, Baby realizes that he had been meeting Sidhu to help the couple find a home. Sidhu arrives just in time to witness the dying property dealer and returns home deeply shaken. Seeing his distress, Baby is overwhelmed with emotions and kisses him. This is the first time she expresses her affection for him.

The next day, Sidhu accidentally kills a dove with Baby's umbrella and is horrified by the revelation of her true profession. Meanwhile, Anjum reviews CCTV footage from Murjhani's murder and identifies Baby by her distinctive shoes from the incident when she had dropped her home. When she visits Baby's home, she finds only Sidhu, who insists on seeing a warrant. Later, Manu informs Baby that Papa has disappeared, likely abducted by Zafar. Sensing danger, Baby orders everyone to relocate. Lucky lures Baby to a construction site intending to kill her, but loses his nerve, allowing her to kill him instead. Realizing that Zafar is now coming after her, Baby contacts Anjum through Sidhu. Baby reveals the truth to Sidhu: on that fateful night, it was the real Baby who died. Before the murder, her sister had removed Baby's anklet so that it would not attract the killer's attention. When their mother later saw the anklet in her surviving daughter's hand, she assumed that the surviving twin was Baby. Out of guilt and fear, the survivor accepted the mistaken identity and lived on as Baby and tells him that she is neither deaf nor mute.

She meets Anjum and confesses to the double murders of Murjhani and Lucky. She also offers to kill Zafar in exchange for immunity. The final confrontation takes place in the same abandoned hotel where her sister was murdered. After a fierce battle with Zafar's men, Baby faces Zafar himself and notices that one of his ears is missing. She realizes that he is the man who killed her sister years ago. After killing him, she finds a message on his phone from Papa asking Zafar whether Baby has been eliminated. It becomes clear that Papa had ultimately ordered her death because he could not bear to lose her. In the end, she confronts Papa and confirms if he knew all along that Zafar had killed Baby. He agrees and Baby swiftly kills him.

In the final scene, Baby sees Siddhu at a railway station, and communicate non verbally that it's over. However, she receives a photo of Induja (cameo by Sonakshi Sinha) with a location pin and a video message from Anjum, hinting at the fact that she's not off the hook yet.

== Cast ==
- Huma Qureshi as Baby KarMarKar
- Sikandar Kher as Zafar Katkar
- Chunky Pandey as P. M. Jain alias "Papa"
- Rachit Singh as Siddhu
- Seema Pahwa as Inspector Anjum Khan
- Marudhar Shekhawat as Manu Jain
- Vidya Malvade as Manju Murjhani
- Himanshu Malik as Mukesh Murjhani
- Arun Kushwah as Lucky
- Karan Dave as Goli
- Pradeep Kabra as Maruti
- Govind Tripathi as Laundry boy
- Sanjay Vichare
- Yogesh Tanpure as Lawyer Thombre
- Dheeraj Sharma
- Zubair Shaikh
- Ganesh Kudale
- Parag Kilche
- Dipak Kabra
- Rupesh Bane as Faizu
- Saqib Saleem as Alpha Q (special appearance in the song "Alpha Q")
- Mangal Kenkre as Baby's mom

== Production ==
The film is produced by Saleem Siblings and Pune 04 Picture.

== Music ==
Baby Do Die Do

Soundtrack album by Arjun Iyer
- Released: 2 July 2026
- Recorded: 2025–2026
- Genre: Feature film soundtrack
- Length: 45:32
- Language: Hindi
- Label: Tips Music
- Producer: Arjun Iyer

Arjun Iyer chronology
Heer Sara (2026)	Baby Do Die Do (2026)	TBA (TBA)
External audio
- Baby Do Die Do - Full Album on YouTube

The film's soundtrack is composed by Arjun Iyer with one song Ishq Kameena 2.0 is composed by Lijo George and the lyrics written by Arjun Iyer, WB Sam, Niket Pandey, Kartik Chaudhary, Traditional (Baba Bulleh Shah), Mohain Shaikh, Dee MC.The song Ishq Kameena 2.0 is remake of Ishq Kameena from Shakti film which was composed by Anu Malik with lyrics written by Sameer Anjaan.

Track listing
No.	Title	Lyrics	Singer(s)	Length
1.	"Ishq Kameena 2.0 (Composed by Lijo George)"	Sameer Anjaan, Mohsin Shaikh, Dee MC	Sonu Nigam, Alka Yagnik, Akasa, Dee MC	3:08
2.	"Kitni Gardi Hai"	WB Sam	Arjun Iyer, Christina Andrew	2:13
3.	"Kaun Hai Woh"	Arjun Iyer, WB Sam	Mohit Chauhan, Arjun Iyer, Christina Andrew	4:01
4.	"Baby Do Die Do - Title Track"	Arjun Iyer	Arjun Iyer, Akasa	2:46
5.	"Myuchal Fund"	WB Sam	Nakash Aziz, Arjun Iyer	3:41
6.	"Jhootha Jogan"	Arjun Iyer, Niket Pandey	Suvarna Tiwari, Sushmita Bala, Madhumita Bala, Meera Venkat	3:31
7.	"Murjha Gaya"	Arjun Iyer		3:03
8.	"Alpha Q"	WB Sam		4:24
9.	"Siddhi"	Karthik Chaudhry	Shahid Mallya	1:13
10.	"Uth Gaye Gawando Yaar"	Traditional, Baba Bulleh Shah		4:54
11.	"Bambai Bambai Bambai"	Arjun Iyer		1:40
12.	"No More - Instrumental"	–	–	2:21
13.	"Uth Gaye Gawando Yaar - Reprise"	Traditional, Baba Bulleh Shah		2:21
14.	"It's Personal- Instrumental"	–	–	1:46
15.	"Badla"	Arjun Iyer		4:30
Total length:				45:32

== Release ==
The film was released on 3 July 2026.

== Reception ==
On the review aggregator website Rotten Tomatoes, 71% of 14 critics' reviews are positive, with an average rating of 5.9/10.

Rahul Desai of The Hollywood Reporter India writes in his review that "The reason Baby Do Die Do works is because it expands the personality of an assassin thriller. The style is not a front for the substance. Baby might be the medium, but it's the city of Mumbai that becomes the protagonist of the film." Aishani Biswas of Outlook rates the film 3.5 out of 5. She said, "Baby Do Die Do is not flawless, but it is refreshingly different. Director Nachiket Samant builds a crime thriller that is less interested in following convention than in creating its own rhythm". She also credited Qureshi for "elevating a thriller that eventually runs out of surprises".

Shubhra Gupta of The Indian Express rated the film 3.5 out of 5. According to her review, the film fully commits to this Sion-via-Seoul aesthetic as no punches are pulled, and the pace rarely flags. She also says "there are a couple of confused, contrived patches, and the big reveals towards the end aren't really as well hidden as the film thinks they are. But those aren't deal breakers". Sana Farzeen of India Today rates the film 3 out of 5. She described the film as "loud, pulpy, unapologetically filmy and one that proudly embraces every bit of its madness. The story itself is familiar, but the screenplay keeps things moving at a brisk pace. At just over two hours, the film never loses your attention". Bollywood Hungama gave 3 stars out of 5 and said that "Baby Do Die Do works due to its stylish execution, quirky characters, unexpected twists and a terrific performance by Huma Qureshi."
