= Seema Pahwa =

Indian actress (born 1962)

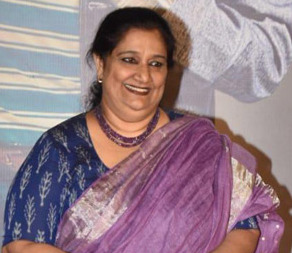
- Pahwa in 2020
- Born: Seema Bhargava; 10 February 1962 (age 64); Delhi, India
- Occupations: Actress; Film director
- Years active: 1984–present
- Spouse: Manoj Pahwa (m. 1988)
- Children: 2
- Relatives: Pahwa family

Seema Pahwa (née Bhargava; born 10 February 1962) is an Indian actress and director known for her varied characters in films and television. She is the recipient of several awards including a Filmfare Award and a Filmfare OTT Award.

She rose to prominence for her role of Badki in the popular Doordarshan soap opera Hum Log (1984–1985). As a theatre actress, she worked with Delhi-based theatre group Sambhav, before moving to Mumbai in 1994 to work in films and continue her work in television and theatre. She directed Ramprasad Ki Tehrvi (2021), her debut as a director, and won the Filmfare Award for Best Debut Director.

== Career ==
Pahwa rose to prominence for her role of Badki in the popular Doordarshan soap opera Hum Log (1984–1985). As a theatre actor she worked with Delhi-based theatre group Sambhav, before moving to Mumbai in 1994 to work in films and continue her work in television and theatre.

Subsequently, she played Maasi, or Aunt on Kasamh Se (2006–2009), a popular Zee TV soap opera by Ekta Kapoor. The character is very kind and loving towards her nephew and his wife Bani Walia, the protagonist. She won the Screen Award for Best Supporting Actress at the 2015 Screen Awards for the film Ankhon Dekhi (2013).

In 2014, she received acclaim for experiential theatre performance of Bhisham Sahni's satire on the middle-class, Saag Meat, where she cooked during the performance, and the food was served to the audience. She was also very popularly loved for her role in the series Hip Hip Hurray, where she played the role of a single mother of Mazhar.

At the 63rd Filmfare Awards, she was nominated twice for the Filmfare Award for Best Supporting Actress for the films Bareilly Ki Barfi and Shubh Mangal Saavdhan (both 2017). She received her third nomination for the Filmfare Award for Best Supporting Actress at the 65th Filmfare Awards for her role in Bala (2019).

In 2020, she starred as Nani in Chintu Ka Birthday (2019), which won her the Filmfare OTT Award for Best Supporting Actress (Web Original.)

She made her directorial debut with the film Ramprasad Ki Tehrvi which premiered at Mumbai Film Festival in 2019 followed by a theatrical release in 2021. The film earned her the Filmfare Award for Best Debut Director at the 67th Filmfare Awards.

== Personal life ==
She was born Seema Bhargava. She is married to actor Manoj Pahwa, a co-actor in Hum Log, and lives in Versova, Mumbai along with their daughter Manukriti and son Mayank. On 2 March 2022, her son Mayank Pahwa married Sanah Kapur, whereas in September 2023, her daughter Manukriti Pahwa married Ruhaan Kapur, both siblings being children of actors Pankaj Kapur and Supriya Pathak Kapur. Sanah and Ruhaan are grandchildren of veteran character artist Dina Pathak and half-siblings of actor Shahid Kapoor.

== Filmography ==
=== Films ===
Key
†	Denotes films that have not yet been released

Year	Film	Role	Notes
1989	Adhuri Zindagi		TV movie co-starring Shah Rukh Khan
1996	Sardari Begum	Kulsum's Mother	
1997	...Jayate	Nurse Linda	TV movie
1999	Godmother	Shanti (Veeram's sister-in-law)	
2000	Hari-Bhari	Rampyari	
2001	Zubeidaa	Zainab Bi	
2008	Roorkee By-Pass	Maasi	Short film
2010	Tere Bin Laden	Shabbo	
2012	Ferrari Ki Sawaari	Baboo Didi	
2014	Ankhon Dekhi	Amma	Won—Screen Award for Best Supporting Actress
2014	Khoobsurat	Shalini Shah	
2015	Dum Laga Ke Haisha	Subhadra Rani	Released internationally as My Big Fat Bride
2015	All Is Well	Mamiji	
2015	Hasmukh Saab Ki Wasihat	Mrs. Sonal Mehta	
2016	Wazir	Pammi	
2016	BHK Bhalla at Halla.Kom	Neelam Khanna	
2017	Bareilly Ki Barfi	Susheela Mishra	Nominated—Filmfare Award for Best Supporting Actress
2017	Shubh Mangal Saavdhan	Sugandha's Mother	Nominated—Filmfare Award for Best Supporting Actress
2018	Khajoor Pe Atke	Sushila	
2018	Everything is Fine	Asha	Short film
2018	Bhaiyya Morey	Old woman	Short film
2019	Ek Ladki Ko Dekha Toh Aisa Laga	Billauri	
2019	Arjun Patiala	MLA Prapti Makkad	
2019	Bala	Mausi	Nominated—Filmfare Award for Best Supporting Actress
2019	Shame	Laundry lady	Short film
2020	Chintu Ka Birthday	Nani	Won—Filmfare OTT Award for Best Supporting Actress (Web Original)
2020	Suraj Pe Mangal Bhari	Yeshodha Dhillon	
2020	Das Capital: Gulamon Ki Rajdhani	Rashida	Streaming on Cinemapreneur
2021	Ramprasad Ki Tehrvi	Director	Debut as a director Won—Filmfare Award for Best Debut Director
2021	Ye Mard Bechara	Shanti Devi	
2022	Badhaai Do	Mrs Singh	
2022	Gangubai Kathiawadi	Sheela	
2022	Raksha Bandhan	Shanoo Sharma	
2022	Thank God	Mrs. Kapoor, Ayaan's mother	
2023	Dream Girl 2	Jumani	
2023	Yaatris	Saroj	
2025	Bhool Chuk Maaf	Ramwati	
2026	Toaster	Dsouza Aunty	
2026	Baby Do Die Do	Anjum Khan	
2026	Yeh Prem Mol Liya		

=== Television ===
Year	Film	Role	Notes
1984–85	Hum Log	Badki	
1995–96	Khushi (Season 1)		
1995	Sidhhi	Sneha Aditya Diwan	
1997	Pehla Pyar	Nirmala Mathur	
1998–01	Hip Hip Hurray	Mrs. Merchant	
1999	Rishtey	Leelavati	Episode 70: Naya Vivah
2000–01	Khushi (Season 2)		
2005	Astitva...Ek Prem Kahani	Archana's mother	
2002	Sanjivani-A Medical Boon		
2002	Des Mein Niklla Hoga Chand		
2003	Aandhi	Bua Ji	
2006–07	Kulvaddhu	Padma Chauhan	
2006–09	Kasamh Se	Billo Masi	
2008	Hum Ladkiyan	Dadiji	
2012	Lakhon Mein Ek	Teejan Bai/Hema Dhawan	
2017	The Kapil Sharma Show	Herself	Episode 128: Promotion of Bareilly Ki Barfi
2020	The Kapil Sharma Show	Herself	Episode 274: Celebrating Hum Log
2021	The Kapil Sharma Show	Herself	Episode 171: Promotion of Ramprasad Ki Tehrvi

=== Web series ===
Year	Film	Role	Notes
2019	Aafat	Rita Mohanty	Web series on MX Player
2022	Mai: A Mother's Rage	Kalpana	Netflix
2022	Jamtara: Sabka Number Aayega S2	Ganga Devi	Netflix
2025	Perfect Family	Kamla Kakaria	YouTube

== Awards and nominations ==
Year	Category	Work	Result
Filmfare Awards
2018	Best Supporting Actress	Bareilly Ki Barfi	Nominated
2018	Best Supporting Actress	Shubh Mangal Saavdhan	Nominated
2020	Best Supporting Actress	Bala	Nominated
2022	Best Film (Critics)	Ramprasad Ki Tehrvi	Nominated
2022	Best Director	Ramprasad Ki Tehrvi	Nominated
2022	Best Story	Ramprasad Ki Tehrvi	Nominated
2022	Best Debut Director	Ramprasad Ki Tehrvi	Won
Filmfare OTT Awards
2020	Best Supporting Actress in a Web Original Film	Chintu Ka Birthday	Won
FOI Online Awards
2018	Best Supporting Actress	Bareilly Ki Barfi	Won
2022	Best Director	Ramprasad Ki Tehrvi	Nominated
IIFA Awards
2018	Best Supporting Actress	Bareilly Ki Barfi	Nominated
2018	Best Supporting Actress	Shubh Mangal Saavdhan	Nominated
Jagran Film Festival
2017	Best Supporting Actress	Bareilly Ki Barfi	Won
Screen Awards
2015	Best Supporting Actress	Ankhon Dekhi (tied with Tabu for Haider)	Won
2018	Best Supporting Actress	Shubh Mangal Saavdhan	Nominated
2020	Best Supporting Actress	Bala	Nominated
Zee Cine Awards
2018	Best Actor in a Supporting Role – Female	Bareilly Ki Barfi	Nominated
