= Vakeel Babu =

Hindi short film from 2022

Vakeel Babu is a 2022 legal drama short film made in Hindi language. The film features a very distinct treatment of legal space in India. The film was directed by Sumit Purohit and starred actors Abhishek Banerjee, Loveleen Mishra, Hetal Gada and Bhamini Oza in prominent roles. It was produced by Civic Studios, a Mumbai-based production house focussed on creating social change through the medium of entertainment. In the case of Vakeel Babu, it highlights the issues of gender based violence and need for gender sensitivity among legal practitioners.

== Plot ==
A young lawyer, distracted with chasing success through his digital video channel, is approached online by an anonymous female victim with a powerful abuser. Will he do justice to the challenge? The film traces the journey of Shiraz Hassan as he rediscovers his purpose in the justice system.

== Cast ==
Abhishek Banerjee as Shiraz Hasan Loveleen Mishra as Rabiya Hasan Bhamini Oza as Malti Mitra Gadhvi Hetal Gada Pallavi Jadhav Solanki Sharma Vinod Surya

== Reception ==
Vakeel Babu was widely appreciated by prominent film critics for its treatment of sensitive issues and for its distinct treatment of how legal system works. Times of India called it an engaging social commentary. Film Companion, leading digital Magazine on Indian films, remarked "Vakeel Babu practices more than it preaches" The leaflet, a reputed legal publication, called it a timely lesson in Public morality It went on to be officially nominated at several Indian and international film festivals like Chicago South Asian Film Festival '22, IFFSA Toronto '22, and New York Indian Film Festival '22.
