= Thamma =

2025 Indian film by Aditya Sarpotdar

- Theatrical release poster
- Directed by: Aditya Sarpotdar
- Written by: Niren Bhatt; Suresh Mathew; Arun Fulara
- Produced by: Dinesh Vijan; Amar Kaushik
- Starring: Ayushmann Khurrana; Rashmika Mandanna; Nawazuddin Siddiqui; Paresh Rawal
- Cinematography: Saurabh Goswami
- Edited by: Hemanti Sarkar
- Music by: Sachin–Jigar
- Production company: Maddock Films
- Distributed by: PVR Inox Pictures (India); Yash Raj Films (International)
- Release date: 21 October 2025
- Running time: 149 minutes
- Country: India
- Language: Hindi
- Budget: ₹145 crore
- Box office: est. ₹169.75 crore

Thamma (pronounced [tʰaːmaː]) (Note: The Hindi text थामा, if correctly transliterated in English, would be Thama or Thaama. However, the film's official English title Thamma is a sensational spelling, done for numerological reasons. The title itself is a pseudoword with no meaning in Hindi, but the filmmakers have attributed its translation to "leader" for the purpose of film promotion.) is a 2025 Indian Hindi-language romantic comedy horror film directed by Aditya Sarpotdar. It is written by Niren Bhatt, Suresh Mathew and Arun Falara and produced by Dinesh Vijan and Amar Kaushik. It is the fifth instalment in the Maddock Horror Comedy Universe. It stars Ayushmann Khurrana, Rashmika Mandanna, Nawazuddin Siddiqui and Paresh Rawal. The film follows a journalist who, after encountering a mysterious woman, turns into a vampiric creature called Betal and must save humanity from the bloodlust of an ancient sect.

Principal photography began in December 2024, primarily taking place in Delhi, Mumbai and Ooty and concluded by mid-2025. The soundtrack album was composed by Sachin–Jigar.

Thamma was theatrically released on 21 October 2025, coinciding with Diwali, in standard, IMAX, 4DX and D-Box formats. The film received mixed reviews from critics, becoming the tenth highest grossing Hindi film of 2025.

== Plot ==
Alok Goyal is a struggling journalist. He attempts to fake a demon sighting in a graveyard but it backfires and he ends up getting mocked as an internet meme. Undeterred, he attempts to prove his courage during a camping trip with his friends by hiking into an unmarked trail and as a result, walks right into a bear which scares his friends away and begins to chase him.

Just as the bear corners Alok, a woman named Tadaka rescues him. Alok faints from exhaustion and when he finally comes to inside an abandoned wrecked plane that serves as Tadaka's home, he instantly gets smitten by her, who tells him he still hasn't fully recovered, promising to drop him off personally when he has and to not go deep into the jungle again, especially at night, without her. Over the next few days, Alok notices that Tadaka doesn't act very normal as her physical prowess is beyond anything he's seen, she gives him whole raw animals whenever he's hungry and when she does find something edible, she refuses to eat it herself. However, he brushes it off.

One night, Tadaka quietly vanishes and Alok sets off into the jungle again, ignoring her previous warnings and ends up getting knocked out by a group of men with whom he sees Tadaka arguing with. He's then dragged to a village, which is Tadaka's true home and inhabited by betaals. Tadaka pleads to let Alok go, swearing he knows nothing about them or her true identity and she hasn't told him anything either. She nearly convinces them but Alok, who's gone partially and temporarily deaf due to being knocked out so hard, gets confused and accidentally ends up insulting the betaals, not realising they're not human, and is thrown into a cave in which a betaal named Yakshashan is chained in. Yakshashan nearly tricks Alok so he may bite him but he's saved at the last second by Tadaka. Furious, Yakshashan orders the same betaals who knocked Alok out to chase after them but they manage to evade them. Alok asks Tadaka to come with him and while she refuses at first, Alok reminds her that she promised to drop him off personally and that he won't let her get punished just to free him.

Alok and Tadaka find a way to get back to Alok's parents's home in Delhi. There is a mysterious enigma around Tadaka which leaves Alok's father suspicious. Tadaka renames herself as Tarika to convince Alok's parents, and she struggles to find sufficient food. Alok decides to take her out for dinner, where she can enjoy non-vegetarian food. At the party, she gets drunk and dances with unknown men. On their way home, the same group of men chase Alok and Tadaka, intent on assaulting her. Alok gets out of the car and attempts to solve the matter peacefully by talking. When he is unable to do so, Tadaka loses and unleashes upon them as a betaal. While she leaves them alive, they are then killed by Yakshasan's followers. Days later, a senior police officer who also happens to be a betaal visits Alok's residence and thinks Tadaka has killed the men, and that she has to leave for Alok's safety.

Alok chases her bus and when he is about to reunite with Tadaka, the car flips over and kills him. She saves his life by biting him, turning him into a betaal. Yakshasan senses the transformation and rejoices as he will soon be freed from the cave now that Tadaka has violated the rule that forbade betaals from turning humans, and the betaal criminal would take his place in captivity as punishment. Alok learns to control his new powers and navigate his new life as a betaal with Tadaka's help.

Alok's father notices his vampire-like teeth. When the truth is revealed to him, he refuses to accept it and takes his son to the exorcist Prabhakar, who tells him Alok's condition cannot be reversed. Janardhan "Jana" is also with Prabhakar, seeking help for his werewolf cousin Bhaskar, who was severely injured during the fight with Sarkata, a headless monster. (Note: As depicted in Stree 2.) Prabhakar says Bhaskar can be cured with the blood of a betaal. Bhaskar finds Alok and fights him, achieving a hybrid form with just one drop of Alok's blood. Tadaka comes to his rescue just in time. They then seek protection from Yadav, who takes them to the local betaal bar. It turns out to be a trap: they drug Alok then confront Tadaka for her violation and order her to leave town.

Tadaka surrenders to the sect and is put in captivity for breaking the sect's rule about drinking human blood. Alok finds his way to the land of the betaals where he and Yakshasan engage in a severe battle. Alok is beaten down and just as Yakshasan kills him, a miracle from their goddess brings him back to life. Alok gains the beating heart of the sect's deity, defeats Yakshasan with his new powers and becomes the new leader.

Yakshasan is put back in the cave but Sarkata appears to free him. Alok, Tadaka and other heads of the sect gear up to hunt Yakshasan. Alok is informed that he would need extra powers to fight him and only the blood of a werewolf can do make him more powerful. Bhaskar, in his new werewolf form, heads towards the betaal sect's temple.

== Cast ==
- Ayushmann Khurrana as Alok Goyal
- Rashmika Mandanna as Taraka / Tarika
- Nawazuddin Siddiqui as Yakshasan
- Paresh Rawal as Ram Bajaj Goyal
- Geeta Agarwal Sharma as Sudha Goyal
- Faisal Malik as Inspector P. K. Yadav
- Rachit Singh as Veeran
- Alexx O'Nell as Alexander / Sikander
- Ankit Mohan as Jimmy
- Vinod Suryavanshi as Ambhu
- Hritika Kanwar as Tanya
- Deepak Kalra as Joy
- Raj Premi as Raktaksh
- Shailesh Korde as Elder Betaal 1
- Krishna Kant Rai as Elder Betaal 2
- Janardhan Kadam as the man at graveyard
- Hashim Haider as News Reporter
- Deepak Daryani as Doctor

Cameo appearances

- Nora Fatehi as an unknown Betaal, and as the dancer from Stree film, referred to as "Chanderi Girl" in the credits and "Chanderi Ki Rani" in the film (also in the song "Dilbar Ki Aankhon Ka")
- Malaika Arora (in the song "Poison Baby")
- Amar Kaushik (in the song "Poison Baby")
- Sathyaraj as Elvis Karim Prabhakar
- Abhishek Banerjee as Janardhan "Jana"
- Varun Dhawan as Bhaskar / Bhediya
- Sunil Kumar as Sarkata

== Production ==
=== Development ===
In July 2022, Dinesh Vijan's next production venture was reported, which would have Ayushmann Khurrana and Samantha Ruth Prabhu, titled Vampires of Vijay Nagar, and was supposed to commence filming late in the year. However it was delayed as the makers considered the recently announced Stree 2 as their top priority. Later in April 2023, it was confirmed that filming will start at the end of the same year. In June 2023, Maddock announced 15 more films with VOV—Vampires of Vijay Nagar as one of them with the scope of expanding their horror-comedy universe, also developing a series of cinematic adaptations of the Arabian Nights.

The film was then launched a year later in June 2024, with Khurrana and Rashmika Mandanna as the lead roles. The film was also teased in the post-credit scene of Stree 2 (2024). On the occasion of Diwali 2024, the announcement teaser of the film was released, revealing the title as Thama. Later, in September 2025, the title was renamed as Thamma, in accordance with numerology. Director Aditya Sarpotdar confirmed in an interview with Zoom that the film is not a horror-comedy like earlier instalments of the Maddock Horror-Comedy Universe but rather a romantic comedy infused with supernatural and mythical elements rather than just rooted in folklore.

=== Casting ===
Ayushmann Khurrana and Rashmika Mandanna were announced as the lead in June 2024. Nawazuddin Siddiqui joined the cast as the main antagonist in October 2024. Paresh Rawal also joined the cast for a supporting role in the same month. Malaika Arora and Nora Fatehi will make special appearances in the songs while Varun Dhawan made a cameo appearance in the film, reprising his role from Bhediya (2022). Samantha Ruth Prabhu was originally cast as the lead actress but opted out due to being diagnosed with Myositis, even returning her signing pay.

=== Filming ===
Principal photography commenced in December 2024 in Chitra Studios, Mumbai. However, the shooting was delayed after Mandanna injured her leg. Later, filming resumed in March 2025 at Film City, Mumbai where sets that look like houses, streets and graveyards of Delhi were erected. In April 2025, filming moved to the forests of Ooty, Nilgiri hills and Dodabetta. Various portions of Siddiqui's character origin as how he became the vampire were also shot in Ooty. Khurrana, Mandanna and Siddiqui wrapped up their portions by May 2025. The special songs featuring Arora and Fatehi were filmed in July 2025. In the same month, Dhawan shot his cameo in six days.

== Music ==
Thamma

Soundtrack album by Sachin–Jigar
- Released: 13 October 2025
- Recorded: 2024–2025
- Genre: Feature film soundtrack
- Length: 13:04
- Language: Hindi
- Labels: Universal Music India; T-Series

Sachin–Jigar chronology
Param Sundari (2025)	Thamma (2025)	Chand Mera Dil (2026)

The film's music was composed by Sachin–Jigar, with lyrics written by Amitabh Bhattacharya,

The first single "Tum Mere Na Huye" was released on 29 September 2025. The second single "Dilbar Ki Aankhon Ka" released on 7 October 2025. The third single "Rahein Na Rahein Hum" released on 10 October 2025. The fourth single "Poison Baby" released on 13 October 2025.

Track listing
No.	Title	Singer(s)	Length
1.	"Tum Mere Na Huye"	Madhubanti Bagchi, Sachin–Jigar, Rana Mazumder, Sumonto Mukherjee, Divya Kumar	3:15
2.	"Dilbar Ki Aankhon Ka"	Rashmeet Kaur, Jigar Saraiya, Abhishek Singh, Amrit Sharma	2:49
3.	"Rahein Na Rahein Hum"	Soumyadeep Sarkar, Sachin–Jigar	4:00
4.	"Poison Baby"	Jasmine Sandlas, Sachin-Jigar, Divya Kumar, Sumonto Mukherjee, Abhishek Singh, Noor Parmar, Hitesh Purani	3:00
Total length:			13:04

== Marketing ==
The film's first look posters were released on 18 August 2025. The film's teaser titled World Of Thamma was released on 19 August 2025. The film's trailer was launched at an event at Bandra Fort, Mumbai on 26 September 2025. It received criticism from viewers for its humour being derivative and repetitive, but Dhawan's cameo received praise.

== Release ==
=== Theatrical ===
The film was released worldwide on 21 October 2025, coinciding with Diwali, in standard, IMAX, 4DX and D-Box formats.

=== Home media ===
The film began streaming on Amazon Prime Video from 16 December 2025.

=== Distribution ===
The film was distributed by PVR Inox Pictures in India and Yash Raj Films internationally.

== Reception ==
=== Box office ===
The film was released on 21 October 2025.

It grossed ₹147.81 crore domestically and ₹21.94 crore overseas for a worldwide gross of ₹169.75 crore.

=== Critical reception ===
Thamma received mixed reviews from critics who criticised its humour, script, Climax and lack of horror as compared to previous one but praised for its music and visuals. On the review aggregator website Rotten Tomatoes, 36% of 11 critics' reviews are positive, with an average rating of 5.3/10.

A critic for Bollywood Hungama rated the film 4 stars out of 5 and wrote "On the whole, THAMMA is a well-packaged entertainer that reinforces why the Maddock Horror Comedy Universe continues to be a franchise worth tracking. At the box office, the winning combination of its genre appeal, brand value, and the extended Diwali weekend is bound to translate into strong collections." Rishabh Suri of Hindustan Times rated the film 3.5 stars out of 5 and wrote "Overall, Thamma feels less like another franchise instalment and more like the moment the MHCU truly finds its rhythm. It blends humour, and heart with surprising confidence, leaving you curious about what’s next...and for once, that curiosity feels well-earned." Dhaval Roy of The Times of India rated the film 3.5 stars out of 5 and wrote "Thamma ends on a thrilling note, teasing the next chapter of the horror-comedy universe. With its engaging humour, strong performances, slick visuals, and inventive VFX, it's a thoroughly entertaining watch-and one that keeps the Stree universe alive and kicking."

Titas Chowdhury of News18 rated the film 3 stars out of 5 and wrote "Thamma was capable of so much more. This is the first time that a mainstream Hindi film is exploring the myths surrounding vampires. Yes, there’s masala, loads of it. But MHCU’s earlier films had raised our expectations so high that by the end of Thamma, you’ll be left feeling high and dry. There was ample room for experimentation and there was so much potential to push boundaries and dare more. But ultimately, the storytelling remains curiously restrained and gets reduced to just another horror-comedy with tropes that arrive on cue." Vinamra Mathur of Firstpost rated the film 2.5 stars out of 5 and wrote "Thamma has sweep, ambition, and imagination but it’s also overlong and repetitive. The vampire jokes stop being comical after a point. There’s an ill-timed kiss too. Another flimsy moment (this time not in good ways) that shows a Herculean Ayushmann Khurrana brings back memories of a man-mountain Hrithik Roshan from the climax of Aap Mujhe Achche Lagne Lage." Tanmayi Savadi of Times Now rated the film 2.5 stars out of 5 and wrote "Rashmika Mandanna gets the meatiest role in the entire horror comedy universe. She has a prominent role and personality to enact. Ayushmann Khurrana is endearing and hilarious. Nawazuddin Siddiqui walks the thin line between cringe and funny; inclined more towards the latter."

Saibal Chatterjee of NDTV rated the film 2.5 stars out of 5 and wrote "Nawazuddin Siddiqui brings an exceptional level of flash and flair to bear upon the titular role. It is a brilliantly modulated performance even when it appears to border on the excessive. That, to a certain extent, is true of the film as a whole. It teeters on the edge at times but never topples over." Vineeta Kumar of India Today rated the film 2 stars out of 5 and wrote "Thamma' is an ambitious but hollow addition to the Maddock horror comedy universe. There's blood, there's chaos, there's even a universe connection, but very little soul. These fangs don't dig deep, and yet, the mess is all over the floor." Rahul Desai of The Hollywood Reporter wrote "The world-building of Thamma feels a little like excited writers' room ideas that don’t go beyond a draft. Given the unfamiliarity of this genre on Hindi shores, the scope is endless. But the focus is more on creativity than subtext; any political nods feel like watered-down draught beer in a Mumbai dive bar. The interplay between actual history and the film’s fictions is not explored enough."
