= O Heeriye =

Single by Ayushmann Khurrana
- Released: 13 September 2013 (Music video); 14 September 2013 (Digital Download)
- Recorded: 2013
- Genre: Soft rock
- Length: 3:35 (Single); 2:57 (Music Video)
- Label: YRF Music
- Songwriters: Ayushmann Khurrana; Rochak Kohli
- Producer: Ayushmann Khurrana

Ayushmann Khurrana singles chronology
"'Saddi Gali'" (2013)	"O Heeriye" (2013)

Music video
- "O Heeriye" on YouTube

"O Heeriye" (English: Oh, sweetheart) is a song by Indian actor and singer Ayushmann Khurrana which he also produced. This is his first non-film single after the immensely popular single "Pani Da Rang" from the 2012 film Vicky Donor and Saddi Galli, Tu Hi Tu from Nautanki Saala! respectively. The song was co-written by Ayushmann Khurrana with his longtime friend and collaborator Rochak Kohli, and this collaboration goes back to their college days. The song is sung in Punjabi.

== Release and marketing ==
"Love can be messy, always. If you are in a steady relationship, there is no fun without being messy and that's part of life, it's all fun."

— Ayushmann Khurrana commenting on the nature of the song

"This song is very special. 'Paani da rang' and 'Saddi gali,' there was a lot of catharsis behind those songs and lot of heartbreaks. This one (O heeriye) is a very happy and romantic song."

— Ayushmann Khurrana talking on the setting of the song and how its different from his previous singles

The song was launched on 14 September 2013 by YRF Music so as to coincide with Ayushmann Khurrana's birthday and termed it as return present from the Vicky Donor actor to his fans.

=== Collaboration with Xolo ===
"Ayushmann's journey as an artiste and performer resonates with our brand vision of continuously exploring the next level of technology. Ayushmann himself is a savvy tech user and is extremely demanding of his devices. Today, we aim to bring newer, more inspiring technology experiences to a wider audience – we are confident our association with Ayushmann will establish a strong connect with our customers."

— Sunil Raina, Head of Xolo, speaking on Ayushmann Khurrana as the brand ambassador of the company.

XOLO, an indigenous mobile manufacturing company which specialises in android phone who recently signed up Ayushmann Khurrana as the company's brand ambassador have also collaborated for the track and a screen showing Xolo powers the next level of Ayushmann, O Heeriye appears at the beginning and ending of the music video. Furthermore, Ayushmann Khurrana is seen using Xolo products in the music video.

== Music video ==
The music video for the track was directed by Ashima Chibber, who earlier directed the 2013 film, Mere Dad Ki Maruti while it was filmed by cinematographer, Adil Afsar and edited by Rizwan Maple.

The music begins at a point with a scene which gives out a sense of confusion in a man's love life, with chairs falling down, a book with one of its torn page thrown in along with an unidentified girl (portrayed by Rhea Chakraborty) exiting a house through a gate. Later after a few hours a disillusioned Ayushmann Khurrana is shown sitting on a chair scribbling on his tablet with a stylus, singing the song as he pens some words. As he writes down disappointedly he reminisces about the happier times with his partner and scenes of them hugging are shown. Further they are shown to enjoy each other's company while listening to music and other activities. Thereafter other scenes are also shown which consolidates the fact that they had a happy relationship which forms the core theme for the rest of the music video. It concludes with a roll-over text saying: "However messy it is ... always be in love ;)", referring to the final scene where the couple leave the house after messing it up.

== Track listing ==
- Digital Download
1. "O Heeriye" – 3:35
