= Ayushmann Khurrana =

Indian actor and singer (born 1984)

- Born: Nishant Khurrana; 14 September 1984 (age 42); Chandigarh, India
- Education: DAV College; Panjab University
- Occupations: Actor; singer
- Years active: 2004–present
- Works: Full list
- Spouse: Tahira Kashyap (m. 2008)
- Children: 2
- Relatives: Aparshakti Khurana (brother)
- Awards: Full list

Ayushmann Khurrana (born Nishant Khurrana; 14 September 1984) is an Indian actor and singer who works in Hindi films. Known for his portrayals of ordinary men often battling social norms, he is the recipient of several awards, including a National Film Award and four Filmfare Awards. He has appeared in Forbes India's Celebrity 100 list of 2013 and 2019, and Time named him one of the 100 most influential people in the world in 2020.

He won the second season of the reality television show MTV Roadies in 2004 and ventured into an anchoring career. In the 2007, he acted in Star Plus series Kayamath as Saket Shergill, Neev's brother. He made his film debut with the romantic comedy Vicky Donor (2012), where his role as a sperm donor earned him the Filmfare Award for Best Male Debut. After a brief setback, he starred in the commercially and critically successful Dum Laga Ke Haisha (2015). Khurrana established himself with the financially successful comedies Bareilly Ki Barfi (2017), Shubh Mangal Saavdhan (2017), Badhaai Ho (2018), Dream Girl (2019), Bala (2019) and Shubh Mangal Zyada Saavdhan (2020). His performances as a blind pianist in the thriller Andhadhun (2018) and an honest cop in the crime drama Article 15 (2019) won him two consecutive Filmfare Critics Award for Best Actor, along with the National Film Award for Best Actor for the former. Following several commercial failures, he starred in the romantic comedy Dream Girl 2 (2023) and the horror comedy Thamma (2025).

In addition to his acting roles, Ayushmann has also lent his voice to the soundtracks of several of his films like "Pani Da Rang", which he sang and co-composed, and earned him the Filmfare Award for Best Male Playback Singer. Since February 2023, he has been a national UNICEF Goodwill Ambassador for India.

== Early life and education ==
Khurrana was born as Nishant Khurrana into a Punjabi Khatri family, on 14 September 1984 in Chandigarh to Poonam and P. Khurrana. His parents changed his name to Ayushmann when he was 3 years old. He has a younger brother, actor Aparshakti Khurana.

His father, P. Khurrana, an astrologer and an author on the subject of astrology, died in 2023 whereas his mother Poonam is a housewife of half-Burmese descent, and has M.A. degree in Hindi.

He was a part of Guru Nanak Khalsa College. He studied at St. John's High School, Chandigarh and DAV College, Chandigarh. He majored in English literature and has a master's degree in Mass Communication from the School of Communication Studies, Panjab University. He did theatre for five years.

During his college days he performed in several plays in Gaiety Theatre, Shimla. He was the founding member of DAV College's "Aaghaaz" and "Manchtantra", which are active theatre groups in Chandigarh. Passionate about theatre, he conceived and acted in numerous street plays, earning recognition at prestigious college festivals such as Mood Indigo (IIT Bombay) and Oasis (BITS Pilani). He won a Best Actor award for playing Ashwatthama in Dharamvir Bharati's Andha Yug.

While Khurrana remains busy with his work in Mumbai, his family still stays in Chandigarh. His brother Aparshakti Khurana was a radio jockey at Radio Mirchi 98.3 FM in Delhi and made his acting debut in the 2016 Aamir Khan-starrer film Dangal. The ambience of literature at home influenced Khurrana as well and he took up writing as a hobby. He also maintains a blog where he writes in Hindi and it has been received very well by his admirers.

== Career ==
=== 2004–2011: Television shows and early career ===
After completing his graduation and post-graduation in journalism, his first job was as a radio personality at BIG FM, Delhi. He participated in the second season of the Indian reality TV series MTV Roadies and won. He hosted the show Big Chai – Maan Na Maan, Main Tera Ayushmann and also won the Young Achievers Award in 2007 for it. He was the youngest recipient of the Bharat Nirman Award in New Delhi.

He also worked in many other MTV shows such as MTV Fully Faltoo Movies, Cheque De India and Jaadoo Ek Baar. He then turned television host with a multiple-talent-based reality show India's Got Talent on Colors TV, which he co-anchored with Nikhil Chinapa, and Stripped, which gave latest updates on the Indian TV industry with a comic tinge, again on MTV. At the end of the year, he was also the anchor of the singing reality show Music Ka Maha Muqqabla on STAR Plus.

Apart from hosting the second season of MTV Rock On and India's Got Talent on Colors, he was also a part of the anchoring team of Extra Innings T20 for Indian Premier League Season 3 on SET Max with Gaurav Kapur, Samir Kochhar, and Angad Bedi, following which he took up the offer of anchoring the dance-based reality show Just Dance on STAR Plus.

=== 2012–2015: Film debut and career struggles ===
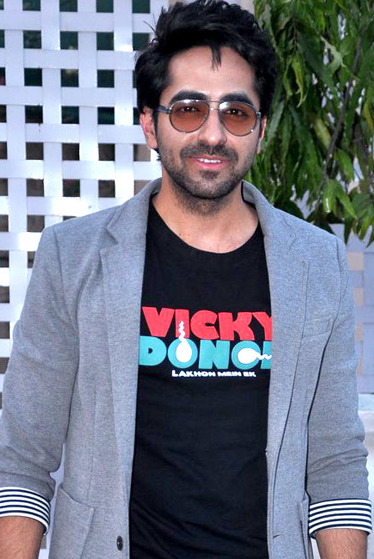
Khurrana at an event for Vicky Donor (2012), his film debut

Khurrana made his acting debut in 2012 with Shoojit Sircar's romantic comedy Vicky Donor, co-starring Annu Kapoor and debutante Yami Gautam. Marking the production debut of actor John Abraham, who cameoed in a promotional song, it starred Khurrana in the titular role of a sperm donor. In preparation, he attended acting workshops and interacted with medical professionals. For the film's soundtrack, he sang "Pani Da Rang", which he had written and composed with Rochak Kohli back in 2003. Praising the film's ensemble cast, Sukanya Verma of Rediff.com wrote that Khurrana's "candid disposition and roguish face ensures his street smart drollery works like a breeze". With worldwide earnings of over ₹610 million (US$6.5 million) against a budget of ₹100 million (US$1.1 million), Vicky Donor emerged as a commercial success. At the Filmfare Awards ceremony, Khurrana was awarded trophies for Best Male Debut and Best Male Playback Singer.

In 2013, Khurrana appeared in Forbes India's Celebrity 100 list, ranking 70th with an estimated annual income of ₹25.8 million (US$280,000). He then collaborated with Kunaal Roy Kapur in Rohan Sippy's Nautanki Saala! (2013), a comedy based on the French film Après Vous (2005). Anupama Chopra found Khurrana to be "earnest" in it but felt that his comedic work was overshadowed by that of Roy Kapur. He also recorded two songs for the film's soundtrack. A year later, Khurrana teamed with Yash Raj Films, as part of a three-film deal, in the romantic comedy Bewakoofiyaan (2014), co-starring Sonam Kapoor and Rishi Kapoor, about a young man who has trouble convincing his girlfriend's father to approve of their marriage. Writing for The New York Times, Andy Webster disliked the film's "strained, contrived humor" but commended Khurrana for "holding his own opposite [Rishi] Kapoor". Both Nautanki Saala and Bewakoofiyaan were commercially unsuccessful, as was his next release, Hawaizaada (2015). In it, he played the scientist Shivkar Bapuji Talpade, for which he lost weight and learnt to speak Marathi. In the same year, Khurrana collaborated with his wife, Tahira Kashyap, to write his autobiography Cracking the Code: My Journey to Bollywood.

Khurrana's career prospects improved when he starred opposite newcomer Bhumi Pednekar in Sharat Katariya's romance Dum Laga Ke Haisha (2015). It tells the story of an underachieving man who is married against his will to an overweight woman, and marked his first film where he did not sing any of the songs. Anuj Kumar of The Hindu praised him for effectively capturing his character's "diction and body language". Despite minimal promotions, the film emerged as a commercial success, grossing over ₹410 million (US$4.4 million) worldwide against its ₹140 million (US$1.5 million) budget.

=== 2017–2020: Established actor ===
After no releases in 2016, he starred in the poorly received Meri Pyaari Bindu opposite Parineeti Chopra, Khurrana's career progressed with his two other films releases of 2017, the romantic-comedy dramas Bareilly Ki Barfi and Shubh Mangal Saavdhan, both of which were commercially successful. Adapted from Nicolas Barreau's French novel The Ingredients of Love, the former starred him alongside Rajkummar Rao and Kriti Sanon as a writer who gets involved in a love triangle with a tomboyish girl and a timid salesman. Saibal Chatterjee of NDTV wrote that Khurrana does a "convincing job of mutating from a brooding jilted lover to a crooked manipulator who puts his own interests above everyone else's". In the latter, he starred opposite Pednekar as a newly engaged man suffering from erectile dysfunction. A remake of the Tamil film Kalyana Samayal Saadham (2013), the film, Khurrana hoped, had a humorous take on mental and sexual problems faced by men which would bring wider attention to the topic. Rajeev Masand took note of how well the film handled sexuality without being crude and commended him for "investing the fellow with genuine likeability and an understated charm". Khurrana received a nomination for the Filmfare Award for Best Actor for the latter film.

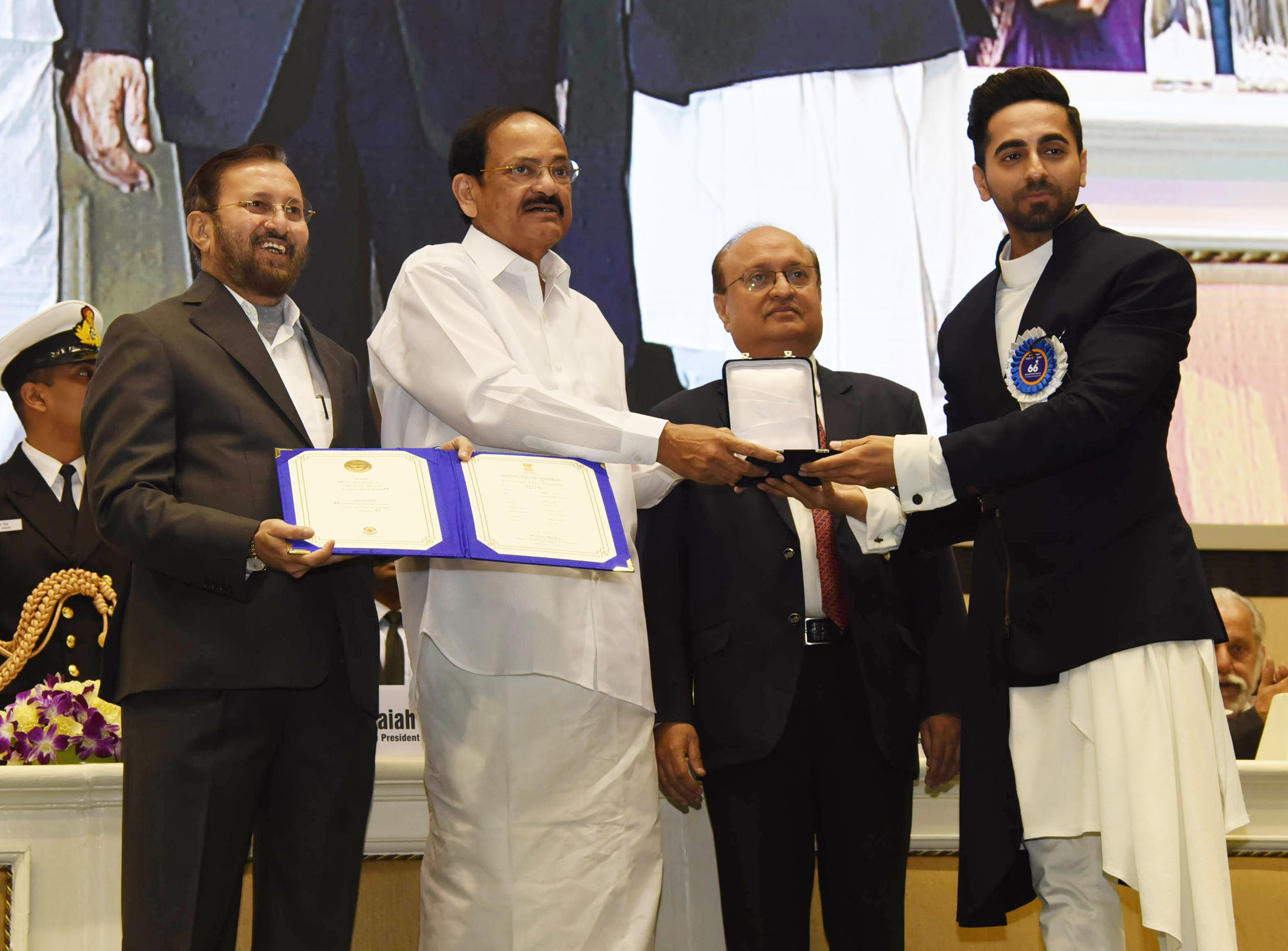
Khurrana accepting the 2019 National Film Award for Best Actor for his performance in Andhadhun

2018 featured Khurrana in two of the highest-grossing Hindi films of the year, both of which won National Film Awards. His first role was in Sriram Raghavan's Andhadhun, a thriller co-starring Tabu and Radhika Apte, in which he played a blind pianist who unwillingly becomes embroiled in a murder. He lobbied for the part after hearing about it from casting director Mukesh Chhabra, and in preparation, learnt how to play the piano and interacted with blind piano players. Udita Jhunjhunwala of Mint praised Khurrana for giving a "taut performance that balances vulnerability with craftiness" and Ankur Pathak of HuffPost found his to be "a layered, no-holds-barred performance worth applauding". Andhadhun earned ₹4.56 billion (US$49 million) worldwide, a majority of which came from the Chinese box office, to become Khurrana's highest-grossing release and one of Indian cinema's biggest grossers. He next starred in Badhaai Ho, a comedy from director Amit Ravindernath Sharma about a young man whose middle-aged mother gets pregnant. Anna M. M. Vetticad of Firstpost considered his performance to be "completely convincing" and commended him for choosing "to work in small films where the star is the story". A surprise blockbuster, it earned over ₹2.21 billion (US$24 million) worldwide. For Andhadhun, Khurrana won the National Film Award for Best Actor and Filmfare Critics Award for Best Actor.

The series of huge successful and blockbuster films continued with Khurrana's 2019 releases: Article 15, Dream Girl, and Bala. The first was a crime thriller directed by Anubhav Sinha in which he played a righteous police officer solving a rape case. Highlighting caste discrimination in India, the film was inspired by multiple events including the 2014 Badaun gang rape allegations and the 2016 Una flogging incident. It was his first dark and intense character in his film career. Writing for The Guardian, Wendy Ide commended him for "combin[ing] soulful Bollywood heartthrob charisma with an arrestingly intense performance." Dream Girl starred him as a cross-gender actor who speaks in a female voice while working at a call centre which unwittingly attracts male attention. Nandini Ramnath of Scroll.in considered his "manic energy and believable Everyman persona" to be the film's highlight. The lattermost was a satire on societal standards of beauty from director Amar Kaushik, in which he played a young man who faces societal pressure due to premature balding. He found it physically challenging to play the part due to the heavy layers of prosthetics used on his head. It marked his second film where he did not sing any of the songs. Rajeev Masand opined that Khurrana "cuts a sympathetic figure as another not-instantly-likeable loser" and added that he had "cornered the market when it comes to playing flawed, insecure men with confidence issues". He won another Filmfare Critics Award for Best Actor for Article 15 and received a Best Actor nomination at the ceremony for Bala. That year, he reappeared on Forbes India's Celebrity 100 list, ranking 37th with an estimated annual income of ₹305 million (US$3.3 million).

For his next project, Khurrana actively looked for another mainstream film that would portray sexuality in a humorous manner. He found it in Shubh Mangal Zyada Saavdhan (2020), in which he played a gay man who has trouble convincing his partner's family of their relationship. It was the first mainstream Bollywood film to be led by openly gay characters. Shubhra Gupta of The Indian Express credited Khurrana for "allowing the film to be so much about" his lesser known co-star Jitendra Kumar. The film performed moderately well at the box-office, despite being impacted by the shutdown of cinemas due to the COVID-19 pandemic in India. He was next seen in the comedy-drama Gulabo Sitabo, directed by Sircar and co-starring Amitabh Bachchan. Due to the pandemic, the film premiered directly on Amazon Prime Video. Pallabi Dey Puryakastha of The Times of India noted that Khurrana's "body language tellingly portrays sadness and bitterness borne out of poverty".

=== 2021–present: Setback and resurgence ===
In 2021, Khurrana played a bodybuilder who falls in love with a trans woman in Abhishek Kapoor's romantic comedy Chandigarh Kare Aashiqui. He then reunited with Sinha for the Northeast India-based Anek (2022). Khurrana next headlined Anubhuti Kashyap's medical drama, Doctor G (2022), with Rakul Preet Singh and Shefali Shah, and starred in Aanand L. Rai's production, An Action Hero, directed by Anirudh Iyer. Despite positive reviews, none of these films performed well at the box office.

Khurrana next starred in Dream Girl 2, a spiritual sequel to his 2019 film Dream Girl, which released in 2023. It marked a commercial resurgence for the actor, emerging as his biggest box-office hit since Bala in 2019. His only release of the year 2025 was the Maddock Horror Comedy Universe's romantic horror film Thamma, which proved to be a moderate critical and commercial success. In 2026, he starred alongside Sara Ali Khan, Wamiqa Gabbi and Rakul Preet Singh in Pati Patni Aur Woh Do, which released to mixed reviews. Khurana next played a Pakistani spy undercover in India, who looses his memory and consider himself as an Indian in the spy comedy film, Udta Teer opposite Sara Ali Khan.

== Personal life ==
Khurrana married his childhood friend, filmmaker and journalism teacher, Tahira Kashyap, in 2008. They have a son and daughter together.

Kashyap was diagnosed with breast cancer in 2018, and following medical treatment, was declared cancer free in 2020. Khurrana credits her belief in Nichiren Buddhism for helping her get through the tough time.

== Discography ==
Year	Song	Album	Composer	Note(s)	Ref(s)
2012	"Pani Da Rang"	Vicky Donor	Himself, Rochak Kohli		
2012	"Pani Da Rang (Female)"	Vicky Donor	Himself, Rochak Kohli	Sung by Sukanya Purkayastha	
2013	"Saddi Gali"	Nautanki Saala!	Himself, Rochak Kohli	Duet with Neeti Mohan	
2013	"Saddi Gali (Unplugged)"	Nautanki Saala!	Himself, Rochak Kohli	Duet with Neeti Mohan	
2013	"Tu Hi Tu"	Nautanki Saala!	Mikey McCleary		
2013	"O Heeriye"	Single	Rochak Kohli	Music video features Rhea Chakraborty	
2014	"Khaamakhaan"	Bewakoofiyaan	Raghu Dixit	Duet with Neeti Mohan	
2014	"Mitti Di Khushboo"	Single	Rochak Kohli	Music video features Huma Qureshi	
2015	"Dil-E-Naadan"	Hawaizaada	Himself	Rendition of Mirza Ghalib's version	
2015	"Dil-E-Naadan (Reprise)" (Along with Shweta Subram)	Hawaizaada	Himself	Rendition of Mirza Ghalib's version	
2015	"Turram Khan"	Hawaizaada	Rochak Kohli	With Papon and Monali Thakur	
2015	"Moh Moh Ke Dhage (Reprise)"	Dum Laga Ke Haisha	Anu Malik		
2015	"Yahin Hoon Main"	Single	Rochak Kohli	Music video features Yami Gautam	
2016	"Ik Vaari"	Single	Aparshakti Khurana	Music video features Aisha Sharma	
2017	"Haareya (Rock version)"	Meri Pyaari Bindu	Sachin–Jigar		
2017	"Orrey Mon"	Single	Upal Sengupta	Music video features Ritabhari Chakraborty	
2017	"Nazm Nazm"	Bareilly Ki Barfi	Arko		
2017	"Kanha (Unplugged)"	Shubh Mangal Savdhan	Tanishk-Vayu		
2018	"Bachpan"	Toffee	Abhinav Bhansal		
2018	"Aap Se Milkar (Reprise)"	Andhadhun	Amit Trivedi		
2018	"Naina Da Kya Kasoor"	Andhadhun	Amit Trivedi		
2018	"Chan Kitthan"	Single	Rochak Kohli	Music video features Pranitha Subhash	
2018	"Nain Na Jodeen"	Badhaai Ho	Rochak Kohli		
2019	"Intezaar (Reprise)"	Article 15	Anurag Saikia		
2019	"Ik Mulakat (Reprise)"	Dream Girl	Meet Bros		
2019	"Ab Teri Baari (with Naezy)"	Single	Clinton Cerejo		
2020	"Mere Liye Tum Kaafi Ho"	Shubh Mangal Zyada Saavdhan	Tanishk-Vayu		
2020	"Arrey Pyaar Kar Le"	Shubh Mangal Zyada Saavdhan	Tanishk Bagchi		
2021	"Kinni Soni He"	Feels Like Ishq	Sameer Kaushal		
2021	"Maafi"	Chandigarh Kare Aashiqui	Sachin-Jigar		
2022	"O Sweetie Sweetie"	Doctor G	Amit Trivedi	Lyrics by Raj Shekhar	
2023	"Rataan Kaaliyan"	Single	Rochak Kohli		
2024	"Akh Da Taara"	Single	Gourov Dasgupta		
2024	"Reh Ja"	Single	Himself		
2024	"Jachdi"	Single	Goldboy		
2025	"The Heartbreak Chhora"	The Heartbreak Chhora (EP)	Gourov Dasgupta		
2025	"Ho Gaya Pyar Re"	The Heartbreak Chhora (EP)	Gourov Dasgupta		
2025	"Drive to Murthal"	The Heartbreak Chhora (EP)	Gourov Dasgupta		

== Bibliography ==
- Khurrana, Ayushmann; Kashyap, Tahira (2015). Cracking the Code: My Journey in Bollywood. Rupa & Co. ISBN 9788129135681.
