= Dream Girl 2 =

2023 Indian film by Raaj Shaandilyaa

- Theatrical release poster
- Directed by: Raaj Shaandilyaa
- Written by: Raaj Shaandilyaa; Naresh Kathooria
- Produced by: Ekta Kapoor; Shobha Kapoor
- Starring: Ayushman Khurana; Ananya Panday; Paresh Rawal; Annu Kapoor; Vijay Raaz
- Cinematography: C. K. Muraleedharan; Jitan Harmeet Singh
- Edited by: Hemal Kothari
- Music by: Songs: Meet Bros; Tanishk Bagchi; Arko Pravo Mukherjee; Background Score: Hitesh Sonik
- Production company: Balaji Motion Pictures
- Distributed by: Pen Marudhar Entertainment
- Release date: 25 August 2023
- Running time: 134 minutes
- Country: India
- Language: Hindi
- Budget: ₹35 crore
- Box office: ₹140.56 crore

Dream Girl 2 is a 2023 Indian Hindi-language comedy-drama film directed by Raaj Shaandilyaa and produced by Ekta Kapoor and Shobha Kapoor under Balaji Motion Pictures. A spiritual sequel to the 2019 film Dream Girl, the film stars Ayushmann Khurrana, alongside an ensemble supporting cast, including Ananya Panday, Paresh Rawal, Annu Kapoor, Rajpal Yadav, Vijay Raaz, Asrani, Abhishek Banerjee, Manjot Singh and Seema Pahwa. The film is about a man who cross-dresses and disguises as a woman, leading to chaos and confusion.

Principal photography began in August 2022 and ended in March 2023. It was released theatrically on 25 August 2023. The film received mixed reviews from critics. It was a commercial success, grossing ₹140 crore worldwide, emerging as the eleventh-highest grossing Hindi film of 2023.

== Plot ==
Karamveer "Karam" Singh is a young middle-class man living in Mathura and works as a Jagarata performer. He has a special talent for perfectly impersonating a female voice. His father, Jagjit Singh, is in huge debt after borrowing multiple loans and is unable to repay them. He is in a relationship with Pari Srivastava, a lawyer from a wealthy family. Pari's father, Jaipal Srivastava, says that he will have Pari marry Karam only if he is able to land a high-paying job and buy a house of his own within six months. In order to earn quick money, Karam disguises himself as a woman going by the alias "Pooja" and becomes a dancer at a bar owned by Sona Bhai. Pari remains unaware of this.

Karam's best friend, Smiley Singh Dhillon is in love with Sakina, the daughter of the hostile Abu Saleem. Abu says that he will have Sakina marry only after his son Shah Rukh Saleem is married. Shah Rukh has been in depression ever since he had a breakup with his lover six months ago. Abu says that he will give a reward of Rs. 10 lakhs to the person who manages to get Shah Rukh out of depression. Smiley requests Karam to pose as "Pooja" and pretend to be a psychiatrist for treating Shah Rukh.

Karam, as "Pooja," manages to cheer Shah Rukh up. Abu is overjoyed and says that he wants "Pooja" to be Shah Rukh's bride and Yusuf Ali Salim Khan, Shah Rukh's wheelchair user grandfather, says that he will pay "Pooja" Rs. 50 lakhs for her marriage to Shah Rukh. Karam, seeing the opportunity to receive the money, decides to proceed with the wedding and abscond later. On the first night after the wedding, Yusuf sees "Pooja" urinating like a man and dies of shock.

Abu says that as per their family tradition, when someone from the family dies, no family member can marry for the next six months, meaning Smiley cannot marry Sakina. Moreover, before dying, Yusuf had written a message on the wall which read - "Daughter-in-law boy". Everyone assumes that he wanted "Pooja" to give birth to a baby boy as a last wish, putting the pressure on "Pooja" to get pregnant, which would practically be impossible.

As "Pooja" cannot go to the bar to dance regularly anymore, Sona Bhai keeps calling her and asking her to come back to work. He also says that he wants to marry her, so that after his divorce, his children do not feel the absence of a mother. Abu's adopted son, Shaukya, is also attracted to "Pooja" and keeps flirting with her and trying to impress her. Meanwhile, Abu misunderstands that Karam is actually "Pooja"'s brother. Abu's sister Jumani who has been married thrice and is actually the wife of Sona Bhai and planning to get divorced is attracted to Karam and comes to Jagjit to propose her marriage to Karam. Jagjit, who is attracted to her, misunderstands that she is talking about her marriage with him. He later realises the truth when he goes on to exchange engagement rings with Jumani, and she clears his confusion.

One night, while trying to get intimate in the bedroom with Shah Rukh, "Pooja"'s wig comes off, revealing Karam's facade. Shah Rukh is shocked and reveals that he is actually gay and Abu forcefully had him break up with his boyfriend so that he can marry a girl instead. Shah Rukh keeps Karam's facade a secret from his family. Sometime later, Jumani asks Karam out on a date and proposes to him with a rose. Pari, who happens to be there coincidentally, misunderstands that Karam is cheating on her with Jumani and breaks up with him. Meanwhile, Sakina gets pregnant, throws her pregnancy positive test down from the balcony which is seen by the whole family, and everyone assumes that Pooja and Shahrukh are going to have a child.

As "Pooja" cannot get pregnant, Abu takes her to Baby Baba, a spiritual guru who can miraculously get women to become pregnant. He asks "Pooja" and Shah Rukh to take a dip in the holy Yamuna river. While doing so, "Pooja" escapes, making everyone believe that she has died by drowning, and a memorial service is held for her.

Karam learns that Pari will marry another man and rushes to the wedding ceremony. He performs a dance as "Pooja", making Pari realise the truth. Karam talks about all the hardships he faced because of his love for Pari and his desire to marry her. Everyone else also arrives there, and all the confusion is cleared. Karam confronts Jaipal about his classist mentality, and he realises his mistake. In the end, Karam and Pari get married in a grand ceremony.

== Cast ==
- Ayushmann Khurrana as Pooja Shahrukh Saleem, Shahrukh's wife / Karamveer "Karam" Singh, Jagjit's son
- Ananya Panday as Adv. Pari Srivastava, Karam's love interest
- Paresh Rawal as Mohammed Abu Saleem, Shah Rukh's father
- Abhishek Banerjee as Mohammed Shahrukh Saleem, Abu's son and Pooja's Husband
- Annu Kapoor as Jagjit Singh, Karam's father
- Vijay Raaz as Saajan Tiwari alias Sona Bhai
- Rajpal Yadav as Mohammed Shoukiya, Abu's step-son
- Asrani as Yusuf Ali Salim Khan, Abu's father
- Manoj Joshi as Jaipal Srivastava, Pari's father
- Seema Pahwa as Jumani Saleem Tiwari, Abu's sister, Sajan's Wife
- Manjot Singh as Smiley Singh Dhillon
- Sudesh Lehri as Baby Baba
- Anusha Mishra as Sakina Saleem
- Aakarsh Dutt Chaturvedi as Naveen Srivastav Paris's Brother
- Ranjan Raj as Tiger Pandey
- Dolly Singh as Tiger Pandey's sister
- Ritu Singh as Tiger Pandey's mother
- Raj Sharma as Kukki Dhillon
- Rajat Poddar as Doctor
- Javed Haider as Inspector Gopal Das
- Raj Qushal as Ali
- Raj Bhansali as Quli
- Sapna Sand as Principal

== Music ==
Dream Girl 2

Soundtrack album by Meet Bros, Tanishk Bagchi, Arko
- Released: 25 August 2023
- Recorded: 2022
- Genre: Feature film soundtrack
- Length: 19:25
- Language: Hindi
- Label: Zee Music Company

Official audio
- Dream Girl 2 - Full Album on YouTube

The music of the film is composed by Meet Bros, Tanishk Bagchi, and Arko while the background score is composed by Hitesh Sonik. The first single titled "Dil Ka Telephone 2.0" was released on 10 August 2023. The second single titled "Naach" was released on 16 August 2023. The third single titled "Jamnapaar" was released on 21 August 2023.

Track listing
No.	Title	Lyrics	Music	Singer(s)	Length
1.	"Dil Ka Telephone 2.0"	Kumaar	Meet Bros	Meet Bros, Jonita Gandhi, Jubin Nautiyal	5:09
2.	"Naach"	Shaan Yadav	Tanishk Bagchi	Nakash Aziz	2:54
3.	"Jamnapaar"	Kumaar, Jonita Gandhi	Meet Bros	Meet Bros, Neha Kakkar, Maanuni Desai, Samaaira Chandhoke	3:35
4.	"Mai Marjawangi"	Rashmi Virag	Meet Bros	Meet Bros, Sunidhi Chauhan, Danish Sabri	4:28
5.	"Piya"	Arko	Arko	Jubin Nautiyal	3:19
Total length:					19:25

== Release ==
In September 2022, it was announced that the film was scheduled to release in theatres on 29 June 2023, which was later preponed by a week to 23 June 2023. Later the release date was changed to 7 July 2023. On 24 April 2023, the film got a new release date which is 25 August 2023.

=== Home media ===
The film premiered on Netflix on 20 October 2023.

== Reception ==
=== Critical response ===
On the review aggregator website Rotten Tomatoes, 8% of 13 critics' reviews are positive, with an average rating of 4.7/10. The film received mixed reviews from audiences.

Taran Adarsh of Bollywood Hungama awarded the film 3.5/5 stars and wrote "Dream Girl 2 works due to the plot, extremely funny scenes, commercial treatment, and performances."

Dhaval Roy of The Times of India gave the film 2.5 out of 5 stars.

=== Box office ===
As of 5 October 2023, the film had grossed ₹124.88 crore (US$13 million) in India, with a further ₹15.68 crore (US$1.6 million) in overseas, for a worldwide total of ₹140.56 crore (US$15 million).
