= MTV Rock On =

Show Logo

MTV Rock On, or Rock On with MTV, is a television show on MTV India. The show is a platform for musicians in India.

== Hosts ==
The first season was hosted by VJ's Ayushmann and Anusha Dandekar, and the second season by Lisa Haydon and VJ Ayushmann.

== Judges ==
The judges were singer and composer Kailash Kher, Ram Sampath and VJ Nikhil in season 1. Bollywood music director Pritam and Indian Ocean bassist Rahul Ram were the judges of season 2.

== Results ==
Season 1:

- Winners: Saadhak led by Nirdosh Sobti
- Runners Up: Khilaugh led by Rahi Chakraborty

Season 2:

- Winners: Divine Connection
- Runners Up: Kaivalyaa

== Format ==
Season one auditioned individual musicians but the second season saw more band auditions.
