= Dream Girl (2019 film) =

2019 Indian film by Raaj Shaandilyaa

- Theatrical release poster
- Directed by: Raaj Shaandilyaa
- Written by: Nirmaan D Singh; Raaj Shaandilyaa
- Screenplay by: Nirmaan D Singh
- Produced by: Ekta Kapoor; Shobha Kapoor
- Starring: Ayushmann Khurrana Nushrratt Bharuccha
- Cinematography: Aseem Mishra
- Music by: Songs: Meet Bros; Background Score: Abhishek Arora
- Production companies: Balaji Motion Pictures; ALT Entertainment
- Distributed by: Pen Marudhar Entertainment
- Release date: 13 September 2019
- Running time: 132 minutes
- Country: India
- Language: Hindi
- Budget: ₹28 crore
- Box office: est. ₹200.8 crore

Dream Girl is a 2019 Indian Hindi-language comedy-drama film directed by Raaj Shaandilyaa in his directorial debut and produced by Ekta Kapoor. It stars Ayushmann Khurrana as a cross-gender actor whose female voice impersonation begets attention from others, talking about depression and loneliness.

Released on 13 September 2019, Dream Girl was a major critical and commercial success, entering the 100 Crore Club in India. It grossed ₹148 crore net in India and over ₹200 crore (US$21 million) worldwide, becoming one of the highest-grossing Hindi films of 2019 and Khurrana's highest-grossing film in India. A spiritual sequel titled Dream Girl 2 was released in 2023.

== Plot ==
Karam is a young stage actor renowned for his ability to imitate female voices and play female characters. To support his father Jagjit financially, Karam uses his female voice to land a job under Mauji alias "W-ji" at a "friendship" call centre where female operators entertain clients. Karam dons the persona of “Pooja” and garners admiration from many clients including an adolescent Toto, P. C. Rajpal, and misandrist Roma, while keeping his job a secret from everyone except his best friend Smiley.

At this juncture, Karam falls in love with Mahi and gets engaged to her, but does not yet reveal his job to her. However, Jagjit and Mahi's brother Mahinder also become Karam's clients and fall for his Pooja persona, much to his chagrin. Unwilling to deceive his loved ones, Karam tries to distance himself from his clients, but Wji threatens to reveal Karam's secret if he does not continue working. To complicate matters further, Toto, Rajpal, Mahinder, and Jagjit propose marriage to Pooja while Roma insists on meeting in person.

As Karam tries to dissuade his admirers, a series of confrontations with them leads Mahi to suspect him of cheating. Karam finally confesses to Mahi that he did his job out of financial need, and Mahi sympathizes with him. When Mahi and Karam confront Wji for his blackmail, the latter retaliates by attempting to frame Karam for Pooja's apparent murder. This plan fails when Karam reveals the truth behind Pooja to everyone, after which Rajpal arrests Wji for his deception.

== Cast ==
- Ayushmann Khurrana as Karamveer "Karam" Singh / Pooja
- Annu Kapoor as Jagjit Singh, Karam's father
- Manjot Singh as Smiley Singh Dhillon, Karam's best friend
- Nushrratt Bharuccha as Mahi Rajput, Karam's girlfriend-turned fiancé
- Abhishek Banerjee as Mahinder Rajput, Mahi's brother
- Neela Mulherkar as Dadi, Mahi's grandmother
- Rajesh Sharma as Mauji a.k.a. "W-ji", Karam's boss
- Vijay Raaz as P. C. Rajpal Kirar
- Neha Saraf as Chandrakanta Kirar, Rajpal's wife
- Raj Bhansali as Chintu "Toto" Gujjar, an adolescent who disrespects his parents
- Nidhi Bisht as Roma Gupta, a journalist who despises men due to her failed relationships
- Vedika Bhandari as Pooja, Wji's employee whose identity Karam adopts
- Riteish Deshmukh in song "Dhagala Lagali" (special appearance)

== Production ==
In November 2018, Ayushman Khurrana announced Dream Girl to be written and directed by Raaj Shaandilyaa and produced by Ekta Kapoor, Shobha Kapoor and Aashish Singh. Nushrratt Bharuccha was cast opposite him. The lead character will have three accents in the film. Ahmed Khan is choreographing the dances with Khurrana in sari.

Principal photography began in December 2018. Bharucha completed her part of filming in January 2019 in Mumbai.

== Release ==
The film was released theatrically on 13 September 2019. ZEE5 acquired digital rights and launched it online on 21 November 2019.

== Reception ==
=== Critical response ===
Dream Girl received mixed response from critics, who criticised the "empty" and "jumbled-up" writing as well as the "tasteless" and "stale" humour, but praised the performances of the supporting cast. The film holds an approval rating of 50% based on 12 reviews on the review aggregator website Rotten Tomatoes, with an average rating of 5.6/10.

Charu Thakur of India Today gave the film three stars out of five, noted that Dream Girl was an out-and-out comedy with witty one-liners and jokes, which made it a long comic skit sans a storyline. She concurred with Taran in praising performance of Khurrana and Kapoor. Criticising director for losing subject of the film she concluded, "However, his [Shaandilyaa's] hesitation to delve deeper into the subject makes it score less on the report card. If you are looking for a light-hearted comedy this weekend, [this film] should definitely be on your list."

Shubhra Gupta of The Indian Express gave two stars out of five and felt the film had many good ideas but those were not executed, stating, ".... these ideas remain half-baked, being mouthed strictly as meaningless dialogue for either laughs or claps". Praising Khurana for his performance, she concluded, "You stay watching Dream Girl for Khurrana. He plays Karam/Pooja with grace and conviction, and makes this thing sing." Priyanka Sinha Jha of News18, praising Khurrana and ensemble of Manjot Singh, Vijay Raaz, Annu Kapoor, Abhishek Banerjee, Nushrat Bharucha, Rajesh Sharma, Nidhi Bisht and Raj Bhansali for their performances, rates the film with three and half stars out of five. Agreeing with Gupta, she noted that the second half did suffer from lack of ingenuity. Praising writer-director Raaj Shaandilyaa for 'keeping the screenplay pithy, the dialogues glib and story on the tracks, she opined, "Dream Girl will surely entertain the film going audiences while sparking off an important conversation on gender constructs in Indian cinema." Writing for Film Companion, Baradwaj Rangan said "These are one-joke characters, and this is a one-joke movie. Very quickly, a sense of staleness sets in."

=== Box office ===
Dream Girl has the opening day collection of ₹10.05 crore, and second day collection of ₹16.42 crore, whereas the third day collection was ₹18.10 crore, taking its total opening weekend collection to ₹44.57 crore in India. On the fourth day the film crossed ₹50 crore and became Khurrana's fastest film to cross ₹50 crore until his next release, Bala. The film has become the eleventh highest-grossing Bollywood film of 2019.

As of 24 October 2019, with a gross of ₹169.36 crore in India and ₹31.44 crore overseas, the film has grossed ₹200.80 crore worldwide.

== Soundtrack ==
Dream Girl

Soundtrack album by Meet Bros
- Released: 6 September 2019
- Recorded: 2019
- Studio: Meet Bros Recording Studio
- Genre: Feature film soundtrack
- Length: 27:32
- Language: Hindi
- Label: Zee Music Company
External audio
- Audio Jukebox on YouTube

The music of the film is composed by Meet Bros while lyrics are by Kumaar and Shabbir Ahmed. The remix version of Dada Kondke's "Dhagala Lagali Kala" was removed due to a copyright issue. All soundtracks listed below have their lyrics credited solely to Kumaar unless noted otherwise:

Track listing
No.	Title	Singer(s)	Length
1.	"Radhe Radhe"	Amit Gupta	3:30
2.	"Dil Ka Telephone"	Nakash Aziz, Jonita Gandhi	3:29
3.	"Dhagala Lagali"	Jyotica Tangri, Mika Singh	3:06
4.	"Ik Mulaqaat" (Lyrics by Shabbir Ahmed)	Altamash Faridi, Palak Muchhal	4:07
5.	"Gat Gat"	Jass Zaildar, Khushboo Grewal	3:40
6.	"Radhe Radhe" (Remix)	Amit Gupta, DJ Harshit Shah	2:45
7.	"Dil Ka Telephone" (Remix)	Nakash Aziz, Jonita Gandhi	3:16
8.	"Ik Mulaqaat" (Unplugged)	Ayushmann Khurrana	3:33
Total length:			27:32
