= Just Dance (Indian TV series) =

- Genre: Reality, Dance
- Created by: Anil Jha
- Directed by: Ashim Sen
- Creative director: Tania Bath
- Presented by: Ayushmann Khurrana
- Judges: Hrithik Roshan; Farah Khan; Vaibhavi Merchant
- Country of origin: India
- Original language: Hindi
- No. of seasons: 1
- No. of episodes: 30

Production
- Production location: Mumbai
- Cinematography: attish dada
- Camera setup: Multi-camera
- Running time: Approx. 52 minutes
- Production company: SOL Productions

Original release
- Network: StarPlus
- Release: 18 June – 1 October 2011

Just Dance is an Indian television dance reality series on Star Plus. The series is judged by Bollywood film actor Hrithik Roshan along with choreographer Vaibhavi Merchant and film director Farah Khan. Hrithik Roshan rehearsed for 5 hours a day for 5 days to shoot for the promotional video of the series, which is choreographed by shows judge, Vaibhavi Merchant. It premiered on 18 June 2011 at 9 PM in India and aired every Saturday and Sunday until 1 October 2011.

== Judges ==
- Hrithik Roshan
- Farah Khan
- Vaibhavi Merchant

== Host ==
- Ayushmann Khurrana

== Contestants ==
The 52 dancers were selected from India and outside of India. They were invited to Mumbai for further competition to select the top 12 dancers for the show. The top 12 contestants were decided for the show but due to some reasons, 13 dancers were selected.

=== Top Dancers ===
- Ankan Sen from Kolkata Winner
- Surjeet Bansal from Delhi 1st Runner-up
- Karan Khanna from Mumbai - 2nd Runner-up
- Rajit Dev from Mumbai - [eliminated]
- Soumita Roy from Kolkata - [eliminated]
- Abhash Mukherjee from Ranchi - [eliminated]
- Swarali Karulkar from Mumbai - [eliminated]
- Meher Malik from Delhi - [eliminated]
- Kruti Shah from Marlboro, New Jersey - [eliminated]
- Karan Pangali from London - [eliminated]
- Irfan Shaikh from Baroda - [eliminated]
- Hitesh Patil from Mumbai - [eliminated]
- Preeti Chafale from Nagpur - [eliminated]

On the day of every elimination Hrithik Roshan gave a check of three Lakh rupees to the eliminated contestant from his personal account (without contribution of TV channel).

=== Winner ===
The Season 1 of the competition was won by Ankan Sen from Kolkata, while Surjeet Bansal from Delhi won the second spot. Ankan Sen was awarded with Rs 1 million and a Maruti Suzuki Swift car. Hrithik personally rewarded Surjeet with 1 million rupees and he also received a Maruti Suzuki Swift car. Both of them got a contract with Star Plus. Karan got a trophy and a Rs 300,000 check from Hrithik.

== Production ==
The show was produced by Sol Production. Maruti Suzuki India Ltd and Cadbury India Ltd were the main sponsors of the show. Around 150 people including cast and crew are working on production team. Actor Hrithik Roshan will make his television debut from Just Dance, produced at nearly Rs. 40 million per episode. Hrithik Roshan has been paid 17.5 million INR per episode which makes him the highest paid Bollywood actor in television entertainment. In terms of scale, this could be among the costliest television productions in the Hindi entertainment genre.

== Format ==
Produced by SOL Productions, the show had 30 episodes. It was start with auditions, and then proceeded through eliminations, as the participants vied to be the apple of Hrithik's eye. Contestants were called through registration process to participate in the audition. In London, the first stage auditions were judged by Samir Bhamra, the best dancers were chosen by Vaibhavi Merchant and Farah Khan and given JDS certificate. Selected contestants waited for the HR Bracelet which allowed them to perform before Hrithik Roshan in Mumbai.

== Reception ==
The show got the highest opening (a cumulative TRP of 4.7) for a reality show for 2011. Hrithik Roshan was voted as the best TV host by a poll conducted by Ormax Media. Besides the show won the award for best reality show at the Indian Television Academy. Ayushmann Khurrana also won award as the best host. As per TAM data, the grand finale held on 1 October 2011 was watched by an unprecedented 97 million viewers in the country. It featured some of Bollywood's well-known actors like Shahrukh Khan, Priyanka Chopra, Sonakshi Sinha and Deepika Padukone.
