= Shubh Mangal Zyada Saavdhan =

2020 Indian film by Hitesh Kewalya

- Theatrical release poster
- Directed by: Hitesh Kewalya
- Written by: Hitesh Kewalya
- Produced by: Aanand L. Rai; Bhushan Kumar; Himanshu Sharma; Krishan Kumar
- Starring: Ayushmann Khurrana; Jitendra Kumar
- Cinematography: Chirantan Das
- Edited by: Ninad Khanolkar
- Music by: Songs: Tanishk Bagchi; Vayu Shrivastav; Tony Kakkar; Score: Karan Kulkarni
- Production companies: T-Series; Colour Yellow Productions
- Distributed by: AA Films
- Release date: 21 February 2020
- Running time: 117 minutes
- Country: India
- Language: Hindi
- Budget: ₹30 crore
- Box office: ₹87 crore

Shubh Mangal Zyada Saavdhan (transl. Be extra careful of marriage) is a 2020 Hindi-language romantic comedy film written and directed by Hitesh Kewalya. It is a spiritual successor to Shubh Mangal Saavdhan (2017). The film stars Ayushmann Khurrana and Jitendra Kumar, with Gajraj Rao, Neena Gupta, Pankhuri Awasthy, Maanvi Gagroo and Manu Rishi in supporting roles. The film tells the story of a gay man and his partner, who have trouble convincing the former's parents of their relationship.

Shubh Mangal Zyada Saavdhan was released worldwide on 21 February 2020, and became a commercial success. At the 66th Filmfare Awards, it received nominations for Best Actor (Khurrana), Best Supporting Actor (Rao), and Best Supporting Actress (Gagroo and Gupta).

== Plot ==
Aman Tripathi is an advertiser from an orthodox middle-class family in Allahabad. His family consists of his mother Sunaina, a housewife, father Shankar, a conservative agricultural scientist who recently created a new variety of black cauliflowers; aunt, uncle and cousins. Aman lives with his boyfriend, Kartik Singh, in Delhi. One day, Sunaina asks him to attend her niece Goggle's wedding. Sunaina and Shankar intend to have Aman marry a family friend's daughter, Kusum Nigam, and are planning on having Aman meet Kusum at Goggle's wedding. Aman and Kartik board the train "Vivah Express", on which Aman's family is already present. On the train, Aman and Kartik share a kiss, and are caught by Shankar. Kartik suggests that Aman should come out to his father while Shankar asks Aman to stay away from Kartik.

At Goggle's wedding, Shankar tries to keep Kartik and Aman away from each other but fails. Kartik and Aman share a kiss publicly, leaving everyone shocked. Shankar and Sunaina confront Aman, who in turn confronts them but they remain unaccepting of his sexuality. Meanwhile, Ashok refuses to marry Goggle due to Aman's sexuality. Kartik is whisked away by Chaman (Aman's paternal uncle) to the railway station to make him leave while Shankar blackmails Aman into agreeing to marry Kusum. Goggle runs away to the railway station and attempts suicide there, but Kartik stops her. Kartik convinces Goggle that marriage is not the most important thing in the world, and that she has a family who supports her. Goggle, in turn, convinces Kartik to win back Aman and reveals that she knew since childhood that Aman was gay.

While returning to Allahabad, Kusum tells Aman that she is already in love with another man called Rakesh. She proposes that they will marry per their family's wishes, but continue to live with their respective lovers in Delhi. Shankar and Sunaina decide to rechristen Aman in order to cleanse him of his "sins". Returning to Allahabad, the family is in the middle of rechristening when Goggle and Kartik appear at their home. Shankar beats Kartik up with a stick, rendering him unconscious. Goggle at the same time fights with her parents and protests that she does not want to marry. Finally, Aman agrees to marry Kusum in order to save Kartik. The family starts the wedding preparations. Kartik tries to convince Aman to not marry Kusum, but Aman is unable to fight against his family.

On the day of the wedding, Shankar and Sunaina learn that the Supreme court is going to deliver its judgment on the decriminalization of homosexuality the next day. They fight over their past lovers and realize that they have been living with each other half-heartedly. They feel that they do not want the same for their son, but decide to proceed with the wedding anyway, thinking that everything will be fine after the wedding. Kartik opens up one of Shankar's black cauliflowers and shows him that it is full of worms. He personifies the cauliflower as Shankar and the worms as his nature. Meanwhile, Kusum steals all of Sunaina's jewelry and runs away, leaving behind a letter in Aman's room. Kartik reads the letter and disguises as the 'bride'. Goggle finds this out and decides to help Aman and Kartik.

During the ceremony, Shankar suspects something is wrong, and inadvertently chases the "bride", when Kartik suddenly reveals himself to everyone's surprise. Goggle then hands over Kusum's note to Sunaina, shocking everyone. Aman confesses his love for Kartik in front of his family, and says that he knew his family were never going to understand him. He asks Shankar if their father-son relationship will change in any way just because he loves Kartik. He tells Sunaina that she had lost her son long before she lost her jewellery. At that moment, the police arrive to arrest Aman and Kartik, they caught Kusum trying to board a bus with the stolen jewellery, who in turn revealed to the police that Aman and Kartik are gay. Chaman steps up and gives a powerful statement supporting Aman and Kartik to the police, it also makes Shankar and Sunaina start reconsidering their beliefs. However the police refuse to leave that night as they are duty-bound to follow the law. Kusum returns the jewellery to Sunaina, who realizes that her son's happiness is more important and gives all of the jewellery to Kusum. Goggle's parents realize that marriage is not the most important thing in the world and give her their approval to stay single if she wants to. Shankar opens up more of his black cauliflowers and realizes that all of them are full of worms, which in turn makes him realize that his beliefs need to change.

The next day, the Supreme Court in its landmark judgement, decriminalizes homosexuality. Aman and Kartik reconcile with the family, and decide to leave for Delhi. Shankar burns all of his black cauliflowers and drops Aman and Kartik at the railway station and tells them that even if he may not understand their love, he does not want Aman to stop living his life to its fullest. The final scene shows that Aman and Kartik will run until they can live their life happily.

== Cast ==
- Ayushmann Khurrana as Kartik Singh
- Jitendra Kumar as Aman Tripathi
- Gajraj Rao as Shankar Tripathi, Aman's father
- Neena Gupta as Sunaina Tripathi, Aman's mother
- Manu Rishi as Chaman Tripathi, Aman's uncle and Goggle's father
- Sunita Rajwar as Champa Tripathi, Aman's aunt and Goggle's mother
- Maanvi Gagroo as Rajni "Goggle" Tripathi, Aman's cousin
- Pankhuri Awasthy as Kusum Nigam, Aman's former fiancée
- Neeraj Singh as Keshav Tripathi, Aman's cousin
- Bhumi Pednekar as Devika Bhatt, Kartik and Aman's friend in Delhi
- Haardik Gabbi as Pintu
- Mahesh Seth as Suryakant Bhatt, Devika's father
- Brij Kumar Pandey as Pandit
- Ajit Singh Palawat as Police Officer
- Bappi Lahiri in a special appearance in the song Arey Pyaar Kar Le as himself

== Release ==
The film was released on 21 February 2020. After Indian theatres shut down mid-March due to COVID-19, the film released on Amazon Prime Video.

== Soundtrack ==
Shubh Mangal Zyada Saavdhan

Soundtrack album by Tanishk Bagchi, Vayu and Tony Kakkar
- Released: 21 February 2020
- Genre: Feature film soundtrack
- Length: 19:34
- Language: Hindi
- Label: T-Series
External audio
- Official Audio Jukebox on YouTube

The film's songs are composed and written by Tanishk Bagchi, Vayu and Tony Kakkar.

The song "Gabru" was originally composed by Yo Yo Honey Singh. The song was released in 2011 in the album International Villager. The song is sung by Romy & music was recreated by Tanishk Bagchi.

The song "Arey Pyaar Kar Le" is a remix of the song "Yaar Bina Chain Kahan Re" from the 1985 film Saaheb, was originally composed by Bappi Lahiri, lyrics by Anjaan and sung by Bappi Lahiri and S. Janaki then was recreated by Tanishk Bagchi.

The song "Kya Karte Thay Sajna" was originally sung by Anuradha Paudwal and Udit Narayan, composed by Anand–Milind and written by Majrooh Sultanpuri from the made-for-television film Lal Dupatta Malmal Ka. It is recreated by Tanishk Bagchi, voiced by Zara Khan and written by Vayu.

Track listing
No.	Title	Lyrics	Music	Singer(s)	Length
1.	"Gabru"	Vayu, Yo Yo Honey Singh	Tanishk Bagchi	Romy, J Star; Rap: Yo Yo Honey Singh	2:45
2.	"Mere Liye Tum Kaafi Ho"	Vayu	Tanishk Bagchi, Vayu	Ayushmann Khurrana	2:12
3.	"Arey Pyaar Kar Le"	Vayu	Tanishk Bagchi	Bappi Lahiri, Ayushmann Khurrana; Rap: Ikka	2:44
4.	"Ooh La La"	Tony Kakkar	Tanishk Bagchi, Tony Kakkar	Sonu Kakkar, Neha Kakkar, Tony Kakkar	3:19
5.	"Aisi Taisi"	Vayu	Tanishk Bagchi, Vayu	Mika Singh	2:42
6.	"Raakh"	Vayu	Tanishk Bagchi, Vayu	Arijit Singh	3:04
7.	"Kya Karte Thay"	Vayu	Tanishk Bagchi	Zara Khan	2:48
Total length:					19:34

== Box office ==
Shubh Mangal Zyada Savdhaan earned ₹95.5 million net at the domestic box office on its opening day. On the second day, the film collected ₹110.8 million. On the third day, the film collected ₹120.3 million taking total opening weekend collection to ₹326.6 million.

As of 20 March 2020, with a gross of ₹72.36 crore in India and ₹14.03 crore overseas, the film has a worldwide gross collection of ₹870 million.

== Reception ==
The film holds an approval rating of 94% based on 16 reviews on the review aggregator website Rotten Tomatoes, with an average rating of 7.2/10.

Pallabi Dey Purkayastha of The Times of India praised the cast, writing that "if Ayushmann highjacks the film with his infectious energy, a mellow Jitendra balances it out with his poker-faced humour and the relatability factor that he maintains throughout the film" and "it is noteworthy as to how well the supporting cast renders its complete (and able) support to the lead pair," while critiquing that "since the film is primarily invested in the small-town drama pertaining to the taboo around same-sex relationships, the writer-director fails to tap on the elements exclusive to small cities like Allahabad" and that "while the first half is engaging, the second half loses its sheen pretty early on and could have been trimmed down by a good 20 minutes."

Anupama Chopra of Film Companion noted that, "Shubh Mangal Zyada Saavdhan wants to be both – an impassioned defense of same-sex love as well as a family entertainer. But the writing can't seamlessly blend the disparate elements."

Saibal Chatterjee of NDTV proclaimed that "The comic flights of fancy do not always take off in the right direction or land smoothly, but with the actors going all out to make the film work, some parts of Shubh Mangal Zyada Saavdhan are genuinely funny and quirky. The film may be erratic in parts, but its entertainment quotient is delightfully high for a film tackling a clash between conservatism and freedom, between tradition and modernity."

Monika Rawal Kukreja of Hindustan Times commented that "Shubh Mangal Zyada Saavdhan is an important film that talks about an important subject conveyed in the simplest manner without sounding preachy at any given point. It touches your heart, makes you laugh and stays with you for a long time."

Devesh Sharma of Filmfare gave the film a rating of 4/5 and urged the audience to "Watch the film for its hilarious comedy, slick all around performances and ultimately for its powerful message of love and acceptance."

== Accolades ==
Award (Note: Awards, festivals and organizations are in alphabetical order.)	Date of ceremony (Note: Date is linked to the article about the awards held that year, wherever possible.)	Category	Recipient(s)	Result	Ref.
AACTA Awards	30 November 2020	Best Asian Film	Hitesh Kewalya, Aanand L. Rai, Bhushan Kumar, Himanshu Sharma	Nominated	
Filmfare Awards	27 March 2021	Best Actor	Ayushmann Khurrana	Nominated	
Filmfare Awards	27 March 2021	Best Supporting Actor	Gajraj Rao	Nominated	
Filmfare Awards	27 March 2021	Best Supporting Actress	Maanvi Gagroo	Nominated	
Filmfare Awards	27 March 2021	Best Supporting Actress	Neena Gupta	Nominated	
Filmfare Awards	27 March 2021	Best Lyricist	Vayu Shrivastav – ("Mere Liye Tum Kaafi Ho")	Nominated	
Filmfare Awards	27 March 2021	Best Male Playback Singer	Ayushmann Khurrana – ("Mere Liye Tum Kaafi Ho")	Nominated	
