= Shubh Mangal Saavdhan =

2017 Indian film by R. S. Prasanna

- Theatrical release poster
- Directed by: R. S. Prasanna
- Screenplay by: Hitesh Kewalya
- Story by: R. S. Prasanna
- Based on: Kalyana Samayal Saadham by R.S. Prasanna
- Produced by: Krishika Lulla; Aanand L. Rai
- Starring: Ayushmann Khurrana; Bhumi Pednekar
- Cinematography: Anuj Rakesh Dhawan
- Edited by: Ninad Khanolkar
- Music by: Songs: Tanishk–Vayu; Background Score: Rachita Arora
- Production companies: Colour Yellow Productions; Eros International
- Distributed by: Eros International
- Release date: 1 September 2017
- Running time: 119 minutes
- Country: India
- Language: Hindi
- Budget: ₹25 crore
- Box office: ₹64.54 crore

Shubh Mangal Saavdhan (transl. Let the Marriage be fruitful) is a 2017 Indian Hindi-language romantic comedy film directed by R. S. Prasanna, written by Hitesh Kewalya, and produced by Krishika Lulla and Aanand L. Rai. Starring Ayushmann Khurrana and Bhumi Pednekar, it is a remake of Prasanna's own Tamil film Kalyana Samayal Saadham (2013). Released on 1 September 2017, the film revolves around Mudit Sharma, who is about to get married, on how he deals with his erectile dysfunction (Note: Referred to euphemistically in the film itself through myriad of metaphors and as "performance anxiety", which is factually a distinct condition than erectile dysfunction in general.) with his fiancé and family.

At the 63rd Filmfare Awards, Shubh Mangal Saavdhan received 5 nominations, including Best Actor (Khurrana), Best Actress (Pednekar) and Best Supporting Actress (Pahwa).

A spiritual successor titled Shubh Mangal Zyada Saavdhan, also starring Khurrana in the lead and Pednekar in a cameo appearance, was released on 21 February 2020; based on an original story and script, written once again by Kewalya, it marked his directorial debut.

== Plot ==
The story is about Mudit Sharma, a Delhi boy with a marketing job, and Sugandha Joshi, a Gurgaon girl whom Mudit falls in love with. Shy by nature, Mudit tries all possible ways to talk to Sugandha but fails. Finally, he decides to send her an online marriage proposal. When the two finally meet, they feel the sparks and decide to take it to the next level. Sugandha takes her time deciding whether to accept the proposal and later calls it her first major decision for her own life. A formal marriage proposal is exchanged between their families.

When Sugandha's parents are out of town, Mudit and Sugandha try getting intimate and when they finally reach the bed, a visibly uncomfortable Mudit declares that he needs to use the washroom. But when he returns, he gets dressed and makes for the main door. When a concerned Sugandha asks him about this sudden change of plans, he simply hints at his problem with the help of a biscuit and tea, getting Sugandha to realize that he is facing a bout of erectile dysfunction (the condition is referred to only euphemistically in the film itself with metaphors like this one, and as misleading euphemism "performance anxiety", an overlapping but generally distinct condition, by a vet character).

Mudit and Sugandha try different ways to solve the problem but fail, and when Mudit comes face to face with the reality of his impending marriage, he decides to cancel it. They argue. Now deeply in love, Sugandha refuses to cancel the wedding and says she will expect him and his baaraat (wedding procession) at the venue.

Eventually, accompanied by a posse of assorted relatives, Mudit leaves for Haridwar where the marriage is scheduled to take place. During the journey, Mudit constantly receives calls from someone stating that he is a well-wisher and knows about his problem. When he reaches Haridwar and the calls continue, Sugandha takes the call and showers abuses on the unknown person before suddenly realizing that the well-wisher is none other than Sugandha's father.

Mudit's future father-in-law takes him to consult with a veterinarian who suggests that the cause is stress. A day prior to the wedding, Sugandha and Mudit try getting intimate one more time, egged on by relatives from both sides of the family. When they exit the room sometime later, they find every family member waiting expectantly about Mudit having done 'it'. Mudit says that he managed to perform but Sugandha disagrees. The families are now deeply worried.

As the hour of the wedding approaches and troubles and disagreements pile on, Mudit stands up for Sugandha and their relationship against family/societal expectations. He even risks his life to stand up for the love of his life, Sugandha. He rejects toxic masculinity and they together define their marriage as a team of equal players. The wedding takes place.

In the closing narration, Sugandha says that nothing happened (i.e. Mudit still presumably had erectile dysfunction) on the first night or their honeymoon and then, they simply got busy with their lives. And one fine day, it simply happened, even as the whole family was busy in a pooja (prayer ceremony).

== Cast ==
- Ayushmann Khurrana as Mudit Sharma, Sugandha's husband
- Bhumi Pednekar as Sugandha Sharma (née Joshi), Mudit's wife
- Brijendra Kala as Sugandha's uncle
- Sanjay Singh as Ajit
- Neeraj Sood as Sugandha's father
- Seema Bhargava as Vimla, Sugandha's mother
- Chittaranjan Tripathy as Mudit's father
- Supriya Shukla as Mudit's mother
- Anmol Bajaj as Anu
- Rahul Chauhan as Mudit's uncle Gabloo Chacha
- Shubhankarfft Tripathi
- Anshul Chauhan as Ginni
- Gopal Datt as veterinary doctor
- Gulzar Dastur as Store Clerk
- Jimmy Sheirgill as himself in a guest appearance
- Ayush Sehgal as kite flying youngster

== Production ==
The idea for the making of a Hindi remake of Kalyana Samayal Saadham (2013) was in talks since 2014 and was originally supposed to be produced by the same team of the original film. Aanand L. Rai was one of the invitees to the Mumbai screening of the film, but the Hindi remake did not enter production due to Rai and Prasanna working on different films at the time. Imran Khan and Shruti Haasan were approached but not signed. The film was extensively shot in Delhi, Rishikesh and Haridwar. Anshul Chauhan was hired to play Bhumi Pednekar's best friend in the film.

== Soundtrack ==
Shubh Mangal Saavdhan

Soundtrack album by Tanishk Bagchi and Vayu
- Released: 25 August 2017
- Recorded: 2017
- Genre: Feature film Soundtrack
- Length: 12:39
- Language: Hindi
- Labels: Eros Music; Divo

Tanishk Bagchi and Vayu chronology
Bareilly Ki Barfi (2017)	Shubh Mangal Saavdhan (2017)	Munna Michael (2017)
External audio
- Audio Jukebox on YouTube

The music of the film is composed by Tanishk Bagchi and Vayu, who also wrote the lyrics for the songs. The first track of the film "Rocket Saiyyan" sung by Ritu Pathak, Brijesh Shandilya and Bagchi was released on 7 August 2017. The second song "Laddoo" sung by Mika Singh and it was released on 21 August 2017. The soundtrack consists of five songs and was released on 25 August 2017.

All songs were written and composed by Tanishk–Vayu.

Track listing
No.	Title	Singer(s)	Length
1.	"Rocket Saiyyan"	Ritu Pathak, Brijesh Shandilya, Tanishk Bagchi	2:42
2.	"Laddoo"	Mika Singh	3:38
3.	"Kankad"	Raja Hasan, Shashaa Tirupati, Rajnigandha Shekhawat, Arman Hasan	3:16
4.	"Kanha" (Female)	Shashaa Tirupati	3:03
5.	"Kanha" (Male)	Ayushmann Khurrana	3:03
Total length:			15:42

== Reception ==
=== Critical response ===
Rajeev Masand of News18 praised the performances of the leading pair, Ayushmann Khurana & Bhumi Pednekar, and concluded his review by saying that, "Shubh Mangal Saavdhan rises above its minor problems to deliver plenty laughs. It's one of the year's most enjoyable films" and gave the film. Neil Soans of The Times of India gave the film praising the performances of the actors and the humor of the film but found the climax of the movie to be a letdown. Ananya Bhattacharya of India Today praised the movie saying, "This is easily one of the best films that Bollywood has given us in 2017. Shubh Mangal Saavdhan does not fall flat. It flies" and gave the film. Sweta Kaushal of Hindustan Times gave the film a saying that, "Prasanna presents Shubh Mangal Saavdhan in a rather flat manner and refuses to give space to characters other than the hero and heroine, leaving behind one mess of what could have been a fun-filled entertainer." Shubhra Gupta of The Indian Express gave the film saying that, "overall this comedy of middle-class-Dilli-manners-and-mores suffers from a sit-com flatness, and a sagging climax."

== Awards and nominations ==
Date of ceremony	Award	Category	Recipient(s) and nominee(s)	Result	Ref.
2 December 2017	Screen Awards	Best Playback Singer – Female	Shashaa Tirupati (for the song "Kanha")	Won	
2 December 2017	Screen Awards	Best Film	Shubh Mangal Saavdhan	Nominated	
2 December 2017	Screen Awards	Best Actor – Male (Popular)	Ayushmann Khurrana	Nominated	
2 December 2017	Screen Awards	Best Actor – Female (Popular)	Bhumi Pednekar	Nominated	
2 December 2017	Screen Awards	Best Actor in a Supporting Role – Female	Seema Bhargava Pahwa	Nominated	
30 December 2017	Zee Cine Awards	Best Actor – Male (Viewer's Choice)	Ayushmann Khurrana	Nominated	
30 December 2017	Zee Cine Awards	Best Actor – Male (Jury's Choice)	Ayushmann Khurrana	Nominated	
30 December 2017	Zee Cine Awards	Best Debutant Director	R. S. Prasanna	Nominated	
30 December 2017	Zee Cine Awards	Best Playback Singer – Female	Shashaa Tirupati (for the song "Kanha")	Nominated	
30 December 2017	Zee Cine Awards	Best Writing	Hitesh Kewalya	Nominated	
20 January 2018	Filmfare Awards	Best Actor	Ayushmann Khurrana	Nominated	
20 January 2018	Filmfare Awards	Best Actress	Bhumi Pednekar	Nominated	
20 January 2018	Filmfare Awards	Best Supporting Actress	Seema Bhargava Pahwa	Nominated	
20 January 2018	Filmfare Awards	Best Playback Singer – Female	Shashaa Tirupati (for the song "Kanha")	Nominated	
20 January 2018	Filmfare Awards	Best Dialogue	Hitesh Kewalya	Won	
28 January 2018	Mirchi Music Awards	Upcoming Male Vocalist of The Year	Master Armaan Hasan (for the song "Kankad")	Nominated	
28 January 2018	Mirchi Music Awards	Upcoming Female Vocalist of The Year	Rajnigandha Shekhawat (for the song "Kankad")	Nominated	
20 March 2018	News18 Reel Movie Awards	Best Film	Shubh Mangal Saavdhan	Nominated	
20 March 2018	News18 Reel Movie Awards	Best Actor	Ayushmann Khurrana	Nominated	
20 March 2018	News18 Reel Movie Awards	Best Actress	Bhumi Pednekar	Nominated	
20 March 2018	News18 Reel Movie Awards	Best Supporting Actress	Seema Bhargava Pahwa	Nominated	
20 March 2018	News18 Reel Movie Awards	Best Director	R. S. Prasanna	Nominated	
22 June 2018	International Indian Film Academy Awards	Best Dialogue	Hitesh Kewalya	Won	
22 June 2018	International Indian Film Academy Awards	Best Actress	Bhumi Pednekar	Nominated	
22 June 2018	International Indian Film Academy Awards	Best Supporting Actress	Seema Bhargava Pahwa	Nominated	

== Sequel ==
Following the commercial success of the film, a spiritual successor titled Shubh Mangal Zyada Saavdhan was announced which is based on homosexuality. Ayushmann Khurrana, the lead actor plays a gay man in the film. A teaser was released on 9 May 2019 giving the theme of the film. The film was initially slated to release on 13 March 2020, but the release was pushed up to 21 February 2020.
