= List of accolades received by Kahaani =

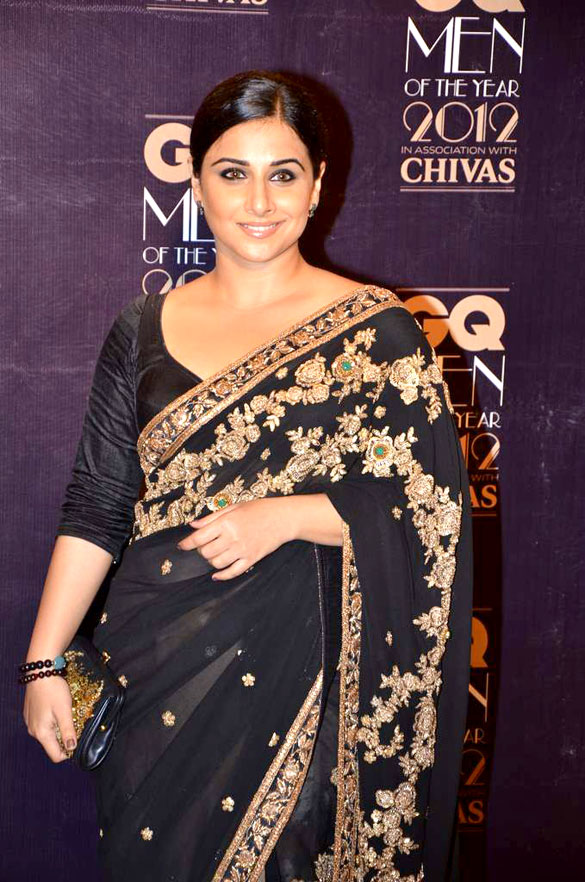
Vidya Balan's performance in Kahaani garnered her several awards and nominations

Kahaani (transl. Story) is a 2012 Indian mystery thriller film directed and co-produced by Sujoy Ghosh. The film stars Vidya Balan as the protagonist, and features Parambrata Chatterjee, Nawazuddin Siddiqui, and Saswata Chatterjee in supporting roles. The film was edited by Namrata Rao, with the cinematography provided by Setu. Set in the city of Kolkata during the festivities of Durga Puja, Kahaani follows the life of a pregnant woman, Vidya Bagchi (Vidya Balan), in search of her husband, a man whose existence is denied by the people she encounters.

Made on a budget of ₹80 million (US$830,000), Kahaani was released on 9 March 2012 and grossed over ₹1.04 billion (US$11 million) worldwide after a 50-day theatrical run. The film garnered awards and nominations in several categories, with particular praise for its direction and the performance of the lead actress. As of 2014, the film has won 28 awards.

At the 58th Filmfare Awards ceremony, Kahaani won five awards, including Best Director for Ghosh and Best Actress for Vidya; the film was also nominated for Best Film. It was nominated in thirteen categories at the Screen Awards ceremony, including Best Film, with Vidya winning for Best Actress. At the 14th ceremony of the Zee Cine Awards, the film won awards in five categories, including Best Film – Critics and Best Actress – Critics. At the 8th Star Guild Awards, Kahaani won four awards, including Best Director and Best Actress, from eight nominations. In the 14th iteration of the International Indian Film Academy Awards, the film garnered five nominations, going on to win Best Actress and Best Editing for Rao. The film won three honours—Best Screenplay (Original) for Ghosh, Best Editing, and a Special Jury prize for Siddiqui—at the 60th ceremony of India's National Film Awards.

== Accolades ==
Award	Date of ceremony (Note: Each date is linked to the article about the awards held that year, wherever possible.)	Category	Recipients	Result	Ref
Asia-Pacific Film Festival	15 December 2012	Best Actress	Vidya Balan	Nominated	
BIG Star Entertainment Awards	31 December 2012	Most Entertaining Film of the Year	Kahaani	Nominated	
BIG Star Entertainment Awards	31 December 2012	Most Entertaining Thriller Film	Kahaani	Won	
BIG Star Entertainment Awards	31 December 2012	Most Entertaining Actor – Female	Vidya Balan	Nominated	
BIG Star Entertainment Awards	31 December 2012	Most Entertaining Actor in a Thriller Film – Female	Vidya Balan	Nominated	
BIG Star Entertainment Awards	31 December 2012	Most Entertaining Director	Sujoy Ghosh	Nominated	
Filmfare Awards	20 January 2013	Best Film	Kahaani	Nominated	
Filmfare Awards	20 January 2013	Best Director	Sujoy Ghosh	Won	
Filmfare Awards	20 January 2013	Best Actress	Vidya Balan	Won	
Filmfare Awards	20 January 2013	Best Sound Design	Sanjay Maurya, Allwyn Rego	Won	
Filmfare Awards	20 January 2013	Best Editing	Namrata Rao	Won	
Filmfare Awards	20 January 2013	Best Cinematography	Setu	Won	
International Indian Film Academy Awards	6 July 2013	Best Film	Kahaani	Nominated	
International Indian Film Academy Awards	6 July 2013	Best Director	Sujoy Ghosh	Nominated	
International Indian Film Academy Awards	6 July 2013	Best Actress	Vidya Balan	Won	
International Indian Film Academy Awards	6 July 2013	Best Performance in a Negative Role	Saswata Chatterjee	Nominated	
International Indian Film Academy Awards	6 July 2013	Best Editing	Namrata Rao	Won	
Lions Gold Awards	18 January 2013	Favorite Actress – Critics	Vidya Balan	Won	
Mirchi Music Awards	7 February 2013	Background Score of the Year	Clinton Cerejo	Won	
National Film Awards	3 May 2013	Best Screenplay (Original)	Sujoy Ghosh	Won	
National Film Awards	3 May 2013	Best Editing	Namrata Rao	Won	
National Film Awards	3 May 2013	Special Jury Award (Note: Also won for his performances in Gangs of Wasseypur – Part 1 and Part 2, Dekh Indian Circus, and Talaash: The Answer Lies Within.)	Nawazuddin Siddiqui	Won	
People's Choice Awards India	27 October 2012	Favourite Movie	Kahaani	Nominated	
People's Choice Awards India	27 October 2012	Favourite Movie Actress	Vidya Balan	Nominated	
Screen Awards	12 January 2013	Best Film	Kahaani	Nominated	
Screen Awards	12 January 2013	Best Director	Sujoy Ghosh	Nominated	
Screen Awards	12 January 2013	Best Actress	Vidya Balan	Won	
Screen Awards	12 January 2013	Best Actress – Popular Choice	Vidya Balan	Nominated	
Screen Awards	12 January 2013	Best Supporting Actor	Parambrata Chatterjee	Nominated	
Screen Awards	12 January 2013	Best Male Debut	Parambrata Chatterjee	Nominated	
Screen Awards	12 January 2013	Best Ensemble Cast	Kahaani	Nominated	
Screen Awards	12 January 2013	Best Story	Sujoy Ghosh, Advaita Kala	Won	
Screen Awards	12 January 2013	Best Editing	Namrata Rao	Won	
Screen Awards	12 January 2013	Best Cinematography	Setu	Nominated	
Screen Awards	12 January 2013	Best Sound Design	Sanjay Maurya, Allwyn Rego	Won	
Screen Awards	12 January 2013	Best Production Design	Subrata Barik, Kaushik Das	Won	
Screen Awards	12 January 2013	Best Background Score	Clinton Cerejo	Nominated	
Star Guild Awards (Note: Also known as Apsara Film & Television Producers Guild Awards.)	16 February 2013	Best Film	Kahaani	Nominated	
Star Guild Awards	16 February 2013	Best Director (Note: Tied with Anurag Basu for Barfi!.)	Sujoy Ghosh	Won	
Star Guild Awards	16 February 2013	Best Actress	Vidya Balan	Won	
Star Guild Awards	16 February 2013	Best Supporting Actor	Nawazuddin Siddiqui	Nominated	
Star Guild Awards	16 February 2013	Best Performance in a Negative Role	Saswata Chatterjee	Nominated	
Star Guild Awards	16 February 2013	Best Male Debut	Parambrata Chatterjee	Nominated	
Star Guild Awards	16 February 2013	Best Male Playback Singer	Amitabh Bachchan for "Ekla Cholo Re"	Nominated	
Star Guild Awards	16 February 2013	Best Story	Sujoy Ghosh, Advaita Kala	Nominated	
Star Guild Awards	16 February 2013	Best Screenplay	Sujoy Ghosh	Won	
Star Guild Awards	16 February 2013	Best Dialogue	Ritesh Shah	Nominated	
Star Guild Awards	16 February 2013	Best Sound Design (Note: Tied with Pritam Das and Sanjay Chaturvedi for Shanghai.)	Sanjay Maurya, Allwin Rego	Won	
Stardust Awards	26 January 2013	Dream Director	Sujoy Ghosh	Nominated	
Stardust Awards	26 January 2013	Hottest Film Producer of the Year	Kushal Kantilal Gada, Sujoy Ghosh	Won	
Stardust Awards	26 January 2013	Star of the Year – Female	Vidya Balan	Nominated	
Stardust Awards	26 January 2013	Best Actress in a Thriller or Action	Vidya Balan	Won	
Stardust Awards	26 January 2013	Breakthrough Performance – Male	Parambrata Chatterjee	Nominated	
Stardust Awards	26 January 2013	Breakthrough Performance – Male	Saswata Chatterjee	Nominated	
Stardust Awards	26 January 2013	Breakthrough Performance – Male	Nawazuddin Siddiqui (Note: Also nominated for his performances in Gangs of Wasseypur – Part 2 and Talaash: The Answer Lies Within.)	Nominated	
Zee Cine Awards	7 January 2013	Best Film	Kahaani	Nominated	
Zee Cine Awards	7 January 2013	Best Director	Sujoy Ghosh	Nominated	
Zee Cine Awards	7 January 2013	Best Actress	Vidya Balan	Nominated	
Zee Cine Awards	7 January 2013	Best Film – Critics	Kahaani	Won	
Zee Cine Awards	7 January 2013	Best Director – Critics	Sujoy Ghosh	Won	
Zee Cine Awards	7 January 2013	Best Actress – Critics	Vidya Balan	Won	
Zee Cine Awards	7 January 2013	Best Performance in a Negative Role	Saswata Chatterjee	Nominated	
Zee Cine Awards	7 January 2013	Best Supporting Actor	Parambrata Chatterjee	Nominated	
Zee Cine Awards	7 January 2013	Best Male Debut	Parambrata Chatterjee	Nominated	
Zee Cine Awards	7 January 2013	Best Story	Sujoy Ghosh, Advaita Kala	Won	
Zee Cine Awards	7 January 2013	Best Editing	Namrata Rao	Won	

== See also ==
- List of Bollywood films of 2012
