= Vishal–Shekhar discography =

Music duo discography

Vishal–Shekhar are an Indian music composer duo consisting of Vishal Dadlani and Shekhar Ravjiani. The duo is best known for their works in Hindi films.

== 1990s ==
Year	Film	Notes
1999	Pyaar Mein Kabhi Kabhi	

== 2000s ==
Year	Film	Notes
2000	Champion	
2001	Bollywood Calling	
2001	Mujhe Kucch Kehna Hai	One song
2001	Rehnaa Hai Terre Dil Mein	One song
2002	Kaante	One Song
2002	Vadh	
2003	Supari	
2003	Jhankaar Beats	Filmfare RD Burman Award for New Music Talent
2003	Waisa Bhi Hota Hai Part II	
2004	Krishna Cottage	
2004	Plan	
2004	Love in Nepal	
2004	Musafir	Recreated by Tanishk Bagchi as O Saki Saki for the film Batla House
2004	Shaadi Ka Laddoo	
2004	Popcorn Khao! Mast Ho Jao	
2004	Rudraksh	
2004	Shaadi Ka Laddoo	
2004	Shukriya: Till Death Do Us Apart	
2004	Stop!	
2004	Kitni Mast Hai Zindagi	TV series
2005	Bluffmaster	
2005	Shabd	
2005	Karam	
2005	Dus	*Title Track is recreated as "Dus Bahane 2.0" for the film Baaghi 3 composed by themselves *Deedar De was recreated for the film Chhalaang. However it was not composed by them though they were given credits for the song *Nominated - Filmfare Award for Best Music Director
2005	Salaam Namaste	
2005	Home Delivery: Aapko... Ghar Tak	
2005	Ek Ajnabee	4 songs
2006	Zinda	
2006	Taxi No. 9211	
2006	Tathastu	
2006	Golmal	
2006	Left Right Left	TV series
2006	I See You	
2007	Honeymoon Travels Pvt. Ltd.	
2007	Ta Ra Rum Pum	
2007	Cash	
2007	Om Shanti Om	*Dhoom Tana was composed by Pyarelal; *Nominated - Filmfare Award for Best Music Director
2008	Tashan	
2008	Chintakayala Ravi	Telugu film
2008	Bhoothnath	
2008	De Taali	
2008	Bachna Ae Haseeno	The Title Track was remade by the duo which was originally composed by R. D. Burman
2008	Dostana	Nominated - Filmfare Award for Best Music Director
2009	Aladin	

== 2010s ==
Year	Film	Notes
2010	Anjaana Anjaani	Nominated - Filmfare Award for Best Music Director
2010	Break Ke Baad	
2010	I Hate Luv Storys	Nominated - Filmfare Award for Best Music Director
2010	Tees Maar Khan	
2011	Navya..Naye Dhadkan Naye Sawaal	TV series
2011	Bbuddah... Hoga Terra Baap	
2011	Rascals	
2011	Ra.One	*Dubbed in Telugu and Tamil; *Nominated - Filmfare Award for Best Music Director
2011	The Dirty Picture	
2012	Kahaani	
2012	Arjun: The Warrior Prince	Animated film
2012	Shanghai	
2012	Student of the Year	Nominated- Filmfare Award for Best Music Director
2013	Balak-Palak	
2013	Gippi	
2013	Chennai Express	*Nominated - Filmfare Award for Best Music Director; *Lungi Dance was used as a promotional song sung and composed by Yo Yo Honey Singh
2013	Gori Tere Pyaar Mein	
2014	Hasee Toh Phasee	
2014	Happy New Year	
2014	Bang Bang!	
2016	Fan	The song Jabra Fan was released in multiple languages
2016	Sultan	Nominated - Filmfare Award for Best Music Director
2016	Akira	
2016	Banjo	
2016	Befikre	
2017	Tiger Zinda Hai	* The song Zinda Hai was composed by Julius Packium * Nominated - Filmfare Award for Best Music Director
2018	Naa Peru Surya	Telugu film
2019	Student of the Year 2	
2019	Bharat	*Zinda was composed by Ali Abbas Zafar along with Julius Packiam; *Chasni (Atif Aslam version) was dropped from the album *Nominated - Filmfare Award for Best Music Director
2019	War	

== 2020s ==
Year	Film	Notes
2020	Baaghi 3	Recreation of the song Dus Bahane from the film "Dus" by themselves as their first own recreation
2020	Khaali Peeli	The song Duniya Sharma Jayegi was previously titled Beyonce Sharma Jayegi
2020	Chhalaang	Recreation of the song Deedar De from the film "Dus". However the recreation is not composed by them though they were given credits for the song.
2021	Chehre	2 songs
2021	Bob Biswas	1 song
2022	Jayeshbhai Jordaar	Theme song composed by Sanchit Balhara and Ankit Balhara
2022	Vikram Vedha	2 songs
2023	Pathaan	Theme song composed by Sanchit Balhara and Ankit Balhara
2024	Fighter	Theme song composed by Sanchit Balhara and Ankit Balhara
2025	Tu Meri Main Tera Main Tera Tu Meri	Full album
