= 2013 Zee Cine Awards =

The Zee Cine Awards 2013; one of the most coveted awards in Bollywood, were made in January 2013.

It was held in Mumbai, India after 10 years (2003)

== Sponsors ==
2012 – Pan Bahar Zee Cine Awards

== Awards ==
The winners are listed below.

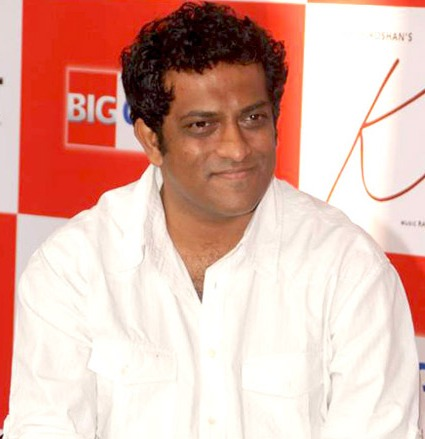
Best Director, winner

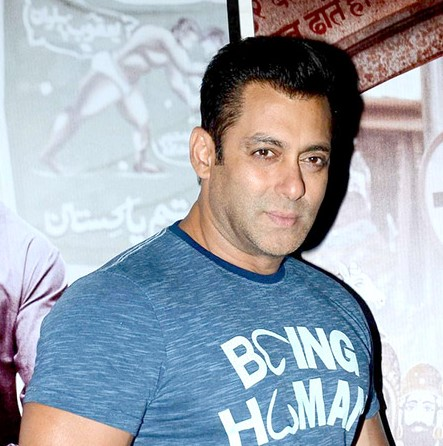
Viewers' Best Actor, winner

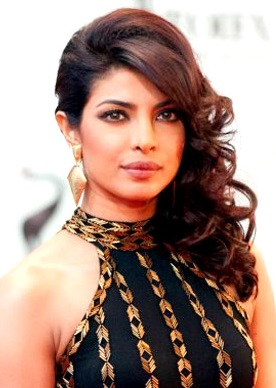
Viewers' choice for Best Actress, winner

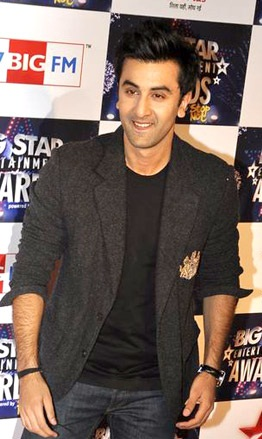
Best Actor - Critics, winner

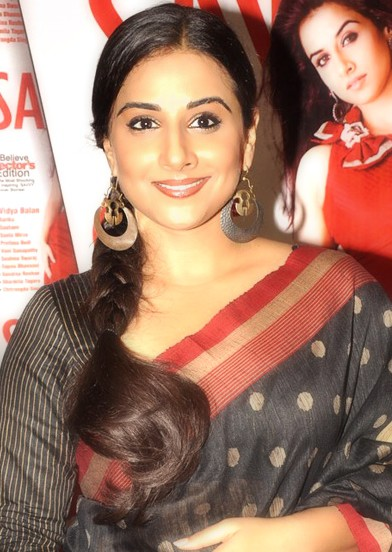
Best Actress - Critics, winner

=== Viewer's choice ===
Year	Winner	Film
Best Film	UTV Motion Pictures	Barfi!
Best Director	Anurag Basu	Barfi!
Best Actor	Salman Khan	Dabangg 2
Best Actress	Priyanka Chopra	Barfi
Best Track of the Year	"Radha"	Student of the Year

=== Jury's choice ===
Year	Winner	Film
Best Film (Critics)	Sujoy Ghosh	Kahaani
Best Director (Critics)	Sujoy Ghosh	Kahaani
Best Actor (Critics)	Ranbir Kapoor	Barfi!
Best Actress (Critics)	Vidya Balan	Kahaani
Best Supporting Actor	Nawazuddin Siddiqui	Talaash
Best Supporting Actress	Anushka Sharma	Jab Tak Hai Jaan
Best Villain	Rishi Kapoor	Agneepath
Best Comedian	Abhishek Bachchan	Bol Bachchan
Most Promising Director	Gauri Shinde	English Vinglish
Best Male Debut	Arjun Kapoor; Ayushmann Khurana	Ishaqzaade; Vicky Donor
Best Female Debut	Ileana D'Cruz; Yami Gautam	Barfi! Vicky Donor
Best Male Playback Singer	Sonu Nigam	Abhi Mujhme Kahin - Agneepath
Best Female Playback Singer	Shreya Ghoshal	Saans - Jab Tak Hai Jaan
Best Music Director	Pritam Chakraborty	Cocktail
Best Lyricist	Kausar Munir	Pareshaan - Ishaqzaade
Lifetime Achievement		Contribution to Hindi Cinema

=== Technical awards ===
Category	Winner	Work
Best Background Music	Ajay–Atul	Agneepath
Best Dialogue	Tigmanshu Dhulia & Sanjay Chauhan	Paan Singh Tomar
Best Story	Sujoy Ghosh & Advaita Kala	Kahaani
Best Screenplay	Anurag Basu	Barfi!
Best Cinematography	Ravi Varman	Barfi!
Best Editing	Namrata Rao	Kahaani
Best Choreography	Ganesh Acharya for "Chikni Chameli"	Agneepath

=== Other awards ===
Category	Winner	Work
International Icon Male	Shah Rukh Khan	Jab Tak Hai Jaan	International Icon Female	Katrina Kaif	Jab Tak Hai Jaan	Zee Cine Award for Best Use of Social Media	Salman Khan	Ek Tha Tiger and Dabangg 2
The Power Club Box Office (100 crore club award)	Yash Chopra, Kabir Khan, Arbaaz Khan, Prabhu Deva, Karan Malhotra, Anurag Basu, Ashwni Dhir, Rohit Shetty and Sajid Khan	Jab Tak Hai Jaan, Ek Tha Tiger, Dabangg 2, Rowdy Rathore, Agneepath, Barfi, Son of Sardar, Bol Bachchan and Housefull 2

== See also ==
- Zee Cine Awards
- Bollywood
- Cinema of India
