= Ishqiya =

2010 Indian film by Abhishek Chaubey

- Theatrical release poster
- Directed by: Abhishek Chaubey
- Written by: Screenplay: Vishal Bhardwaj; Sabrina Dhawan; Abhishek Chaubey; Gulzar; Dialogues: Vishal Bhardwaj
- Story by: Gulzar
- Produced by: Raman Maroo; Vishal Bhardwaj
- Starring: Vidya Balan; Naseeruddin Shah; Arshad Warsi
- Cinematography: Mohana Krishna
- Edited by: Namrata Rao
- Music by: Songs: Vishal Bhardwaj; Background Score: Hitesh Sonik
- Production companies: Vishal Bhardwaj Pictures; Shemaroo Entertainment
- Distributed by: BSK Network and Entertainment
- Release date: 29 January 2010
- Running time: 115 minutes
- Country: India
- Language: Hindi
- Budget: ₹19 crore
- Box office: ₹31.81 crore

Ishqiya (transl. Passionate) is a 2010 Indian Hindi-language slapstick dark-humor film directed by debutante Abhishek Chaubey and produced by Raman Maroo and Vishal Bhardwaj. The film stars Vidya Balan, Naseeruddin Shah, Arshad Warsi. The film was released on 29 January 2010.

The film opened to positive critical reception and performed moderately well at the box office. It was selected for screening at the 34th Cairo International Film Festival. A sequel Dedh Ishqiya was released in January 2014 with the same cast and crew, sans Vidya Balan, who was substituted by Madhuri Dixit and Huma Qureshi.

== Plot ==
Ishqiya starts with Krishna Verma trying to convince her husband, Vidyadhar Verma, a local gang-lord, that he should surrender. He agrees but is soon killed in a gas explosion. Two criminals, Iftikhar aka Khalujan and Razzak Hussain aka Babban, botch a job and escape from their boss, Mushtaq, who intends to bury them alive. They travel to Gorakhpur in Uttar Pradesh to seek refuge in Vidhyadhar Verma's house.

However, they meet his widow, Krishna, who provides them shelter and attempts to seduce them to achieve her secret goal. She proposes kidnapping Kamalkant Kakkar, aka KK, a small businessman. The duo reluctantly agrees, as they want to escape Mushtaq. Meanwhile, Khalujan and Babban realize they are falling for Krishna but do not confess their feelings to each other. Babban eventually seduces Krishna, and they have sex. Khalujan decides to confess his feelings to Krishna, but is shocked to see Krishna and Babban dancing together after their encounter. Khalujan is angry but keeps quiet. However, when the kidnapping plan goes awry, Khalujan and Babban begin to fight.

Meanwhile, Krishna tortures KK and asks him where her husband is hiding, revealing that Verma might be alive. KK finally calls Verma. Babban and Khalujan realise that Krishna was just using them. They confront her, whereupon she reveals that KK and Verma were partners in the illegal business and that Verma is still alive. The duo reaches KK's factory and is shocked to find Verma. Verma's goons blindfold the duo and take them to a deserted spot. When they take off their blindfolds, Babban sees Nandu (Alok Kumar), a boy he had previously met, pointing a gun at them. Nandu leaves them alive and explains the whole story. He says that Verma had no plans to leave his criminal life, so he faked his death in front of the world, to get two benefits: getting rid of his wife by killing her in an explosion and faking his death so he could start a new life with a new identity since the police were after him. Khalujan and Babban race back to Krishna's house, where they have left her tied to a chair.

Meanwhile, Krishna succeeds in opening the tube of the gas cylinder, causing a leak. Verma confronts her, and she tries to kill them by igniting a lighter. Verma assaults Krishna while the duo arrives. Soon, the police arrive at the scene, too. Verma's goons are killed in a shootout, while Verma is killed in a gas explosion. The duo saves Krishna, and soon the trio is seen walking away from the burning house.

Unknown to them, Mushtaq is pointing a gun at them. Suddenly, Mushtaq's wife calls. The trio is still seen through the gun hole of Mushtaq, making their fate unclear, although it can be assumed that Mushtaq left them alive.

== Cast ==
- Vidya Balan as Krishna Verma
- Naseeruddin Shah as Khalujan/Khalu/Iftikhar Hussain
- Arshad Warsi as Razzak Hussain aka Babban
- Salman Shahid as Mushtaq Bhai
- Adil Hussain as Vidyadhar Verma/Shyam Prasad Kulshreshtha
- Rajesh Sharma as Kamalkant Kakkar 'KK'
- Anupama Kumar as Manju Kakkar (in photograph)
- Gauri Malla as Mamta
- Alok Aarav as Nandu
- Anisa Bano as Tai

== Production ==
Initially Pankaj Tripathi was supposed to play the role of Khalujan which later went to Naseeruddin Shah. Preity Zinta and Irrfan Khan were approached to play Krishna Verma and Babban. Zinta liked the script, yet she walked out of the project as she believed that casting Irrfan Khan would demean the commercial value of the film. Lara Dutta and Vidya Balan were then approached to play the role. Balan gave her nod and she was finalised.

Khan, on the other hand felt that the script was not in favour of the role he was offered and he also walked out of the project. Arshad Warsi was then finalised to portray Babban.

== Soundtrack ==
The soundtrack of the film was composed by Vishal Bhardwaj and the lyrics are penned by Gulzar. The music was released on 1 January 2010. The reception to the music has been positive, with "Dil To Bachcha Hai" and "Ibn-E-Batuta" being instant chartbusters. The track "Badi Dheere Jali", based on an Indian classical raaga "Lalit" and the ghazal "Ab Mujhe Koi" are sung by Rekha Bhardwaj.

== Reception ==
=== Critical reception ===
Anupama Chopra of NDTV wrote, "Ishqiya would have faltered if the performances had not matched the writing but all three leads are absolutely terrific," while giving the movie 3.5 stars out of 5. Rajeev Masand of CNN-IBN while giving it 3.5 on a 5-star rating, called it, "a delicious little film that teeters dangerously between saucy comedy and suspenseful noir....the film sparkles for its inspired writing and uncompromised direction." Pratim D. Gupta of The Telegraph called Ishqiya "a rollercoaster rustic ride through ishq aaj kal" and praised director Abhishek Chaubey calling his "one of the most assured debuts in recent Hindi cinema." Noyon Jyoti Parasara of AOL gave 4 out of 5 stars and said, "Ishqiya could have been an average film had it not been for the screenplay." The Indiatimes review also gave 3.5 stars out of 5. Taran Adarsh of Bollywood Hungama while giving the film 4 on a 5 star rating scale, said "You can't help but fall in ishq with Ishqiya. Tired of sherbat? Try this spicy jaljeera for a change!"

== Accolades ==
Award	Date of ceremony (Note: Date is linked to the article about the awards held that year, wherever possible.)	Category	Recipient(s)	Result	Ref.
BIG Star Entertainment Awards	21 December 2010	Most Entertaining Film Actor – Female	Vidya Balan	Won	
BIG Star Entertainment Awards	21 December 2010	Most Entertaining Music	Vishal Bhardwaj	Nominated	
BIG Star Entertainment Awards	21 December 2010	Most Entertaining Singer – Male	Rahat Fateh Ali Khan ("Dil Toh Bachcha Hai Ji")	Nominated	
FICCI Frames Excellence Honours	23–25 March 2011	Best Actress	Vidya Balan	Won	
Filmfare Awards	29 January 2011	Best Actress	Vidya Balan	Nominated	
Filmfare Awards	29 January 2011	Critics Award for Best Actress	Vidya Balan	Won	
Filmfare Awards	29 January 2011	Best Supporting Actor	Arshad Warsi	Nominated	
Filmfare Awards	29 January 2011	Best Music Director	Vishal Bhardwaj	Nominated	
Filmfare Awards	29 January 2011	Best Lyricist	Gulzar ("Dil Toh Bachcha Hai Ji")	Won	
Filmfare Awards	29 January 2011	Best Male Playback Singer	Rahat Fateh Ali Khan ("Dil Toh Bachcha Hai Ji")	Won	
International Indian Film Academy Awards	23–25 June 2011	Best Story	Abhishek Chaubey	Nominated	
International Indian Film Academy Awards	23–25 June 2011	Best Screenplay	Abhishek Chaubey; Sabrina Dhawan; Vishal Bhardwaj	Nominated	
International Indian Film Academy Awards	23–25 June 2011	Best Dialogue	Vishal Bhardwaj	Won	
International Indian Film Academy Awards	23–25 June 2011	Best Actress	Vidya Balan	Nominated	
International Indian Film Academy Awards	23–25 June 2011	Best Supporting Actor	Arshad Warsi	Nominated	
International Indian Film Academy Awards	23–25 June 2011	Best Music Director	Vishal Bhardwaj	Nominated	
International Indian Film Academy Awards	23–25 June 2011	Best Lyricist	Gulzar ("Dil Toh Bachcha Hai Ji")	Nominated	
International Indian Film Academy Awards	23–25 June 2011	Best Male Playback Singer	Rahat Fateh Ali Khan ("Dil Toh Bachcha Hai Ji")	Nominated	
International Indian Film Academy Awards	23–25 June 2011	Best Female Playback Singer	Rekha Bhardwaj ("Ab Mujhey Koi")	Nominated	
Mirchi Music Awards	27 January 2011	Album of The Year	Vishal Bhardwaj; Gulzar	Nominated	
Mirchi Music Awards	27 January 2011	Music Composer of The Year	Vishal Bhardwaj ("Dil Toh Bachcha Hai Ji")	Nominated	
Mirchi Music Awards	27 January 2011	Lyricist of The Year	Gulzar ("Dil Toh Bachcha Hai Ji")	Won	
Mirchi Music Awards	27 January 2011	Raag-Inspired Song of the Year	"Badi Dheere Jali"	Nominated	
Mirchi Music Awards	27 January 2011	Best Programmer & Arranger of the Year	Hitesh Sonik and Clinton Cerejo ("Dil To Bachcha Hai")	Nominated	
Mirchi Music Awards	27 January 2011	Best Song Recording	Salman Khan Afridi and Farhad K Dadyburjor ("Dil To Bachcha Hai")	Won	
National Film Awards	9 September 2011	Best Music Direction	Vishal Bhardwaj	Won	
National Film Awards	9 September 2011	Best Female Playback Singer	Rekha Bhardwaj ("Badi Dheere Jali")	Won	
National Film Awards	9 September 2011	Best Audiography (Location Sound Recordist)	Kaamod Kharade	Won	
National Film Awards	9 September 2011	Best Audiography (Re-recordist of the Final Mixed Track)	Debajit Changmai	Won	
Producers Guild Film Awards	11 January 2011	Best Film	Raman Maroo and Vishal Bhardwaj	Nominated	
Producers Guild Film Awards	11 January 2011	Best Story	Abhishek Chaubey	Nominated	
Producers Guild Film Awards	11 January 2011	Best Screenplay	Abhishek Chaubey; Sabrina Dhawan; Vishal Bhardwaj	Nominated	
Producers Guild Film Awards	11 January 2011	Best Actress in a Leading Role	Vidya Balan	Won	
Producers Guild Film Awards	11 January 2011	Best Actor in a Supporting Role	Naseeruddin Shah	Nominated	
Producers Guild Film Awards	11 January 2011	Best Music Director	Vishal Bhardwaj	Nominated	
Producers Guild Film Awards	11 January 2011	Best Lyricist	Gulzar ("Dil Toh Bachcha Hai Ji")	Won	
Producers Guild Film Awards	11 January 2011	Best Male Playback Singer	Rahat Fateh Ali Khan ("Dil Toh Bachcha Hai Ji")	Nominated	
Screen Awards	6 January 2011	Most Promising Debut Director	Abhishek Chaubey	Nominated	
Screen Awards	6 January 2011	Best Actor	Naseeruddin Shah	Nominated	
Screen Awards	6 January 2011	Best Actress	Vidya Balan	Won	
Screen Awards	6 January 2011	Best Supporting Actor	Arshad Warsi	Won	
Screen Awards	6 January 2011	Best Music Director	Vishal Bhardwaj	Nominated	
Screen Awards	6 January 2011	Best Background Music	Vishal Bhardwaj	Nominated	
Screen Awards	6 January 2011	Best Lyricist	Gulzar ("Dil Toh Bachcha Hai Ji")	Won	
Screen Awards	6 January 2011	Best Lyricist	Gulzar ("Ibn-e-batuta")	Nominated	
Screen Awards	6 January 2011	Best Male Playback Singer	Rahat Fateh Ali Khan ("Dil Toh Bachcha Hai Ji")	Won	
Screen Awards	6 January 2011	Best Female Playback	Rekha Bhardwaj ("Ab Mujhe Koi" and "Badi Dheere Jali")	Nominated	
Screen Awards	6 January 2011	Best Editing	Namrata Rao	Nominated	
Screen Awards	6 January 2011	Best Sound Design	Shajith Koyeri	Nominated	
Stardust Awards	6 February 2011	Hottest New Director	Abhishek Chaubey	Nominated	
Stardust Awards	6 February 2011	Best Director – Thriller or Action	Abhishek Chaubey	Nominated	
Stardust Awards	6 February 2011	Best Film – Thriller or Action	Ishqiya	Nominated	
Stardust Awards	6 February 2011	Best Actor in a Thriller or Action	Naseeruddin Shah	Nominated	
Stardust Awards	6 February 2011	Best Actor in a Thriller or Action	Arshad Warsi	Nominated	
Stardust Awards	6 February 2011	Best Actress in a Thriller or Action	Vidya Balan	Won	
Stardust Awards	6 February 2011	Star of the Year – Female	Vidya Balan	Nominated	
Zee Cine Awards	14 January 2011	Most Promising Debut Director	Abhishek Chaubey	Nominated	
Zee Cine Awards	14 January 2011	Best Actor – Female	Vidya Balan	Won	
Zee Cine Awards	14 January 2011	Critics Award for Best Actor – Female	Vidya Balan	Won	
Zee Cine Awards	14 January 2011	Best Actor in a Supporting Role – Male	Naseeruddin Shah	Nominated	
Zee Cine Awards	14 January 2011	Best Lyricist	Gulzaar ("Dil To Bachcha Hai Ji")	Won	
Zee Cine Awards	14 January 2011	Best Track of the Year	"Dil To Bachcha Hai Ji"	Nominated	

== Sequel ==
At a private party, the producers of Ishqiya, Shemaroo and Vishal Bhardwaj, announced the sequel, Dedh Ishqiya, with the same cast and crew. In April 2012, Madhuri Dixit signed on for the sequel of Ishqiya, her first film after moving back to the country in November 2011 to play a grey character called Shahi Begum. The two male leads Naseeruddin Shah and Arshad Warsi were retained from the original. The role of supporting actress first was offered to Asin Thottumkal but, she refused to work in a supporting role in Dedh Ishqiya and in one interview she said that she thought that her role is not very attractive so, she left the project. Kangana Ranaut then signed Dedh Ishqiya and said she was going to start shooting soon. But in December 2012 she opted out due to date issues. Huma Qureshi replaced Kangna Ranaut. Arshad Warsi stated that he was paired with Huma and Madhuri was paired opposite Naseeruddin Shah.

The shooting was initially scheduled to start in September and was shifted to November, but it was postponed even further. The shooting of Dedh Ishqiya began on 27 February 2013. The Mahmudabad palace near Barabanki was spruced up for the shoot. Madhuri Dixit performed mujra to a song titled Apne Karar Mein. Pandit Birju Maharaj choreographed the dance sequence for Madhuri Dixit for the film. First look of the film was released on 25 October 2013, trailer got released on 8 November, and the film has released worldwide on 10 January 2014, with 1200 screens in India.

== See also ==
- List of Hindi films of 2010
