= Stardust Award for Best Director – Thriller or Action =

Film award in India

The Stardust Award for Best Director – Thriller/Action is a category at the Stardust Awards, an annual event recognizing achievements in Hindi-language films in India, first held in 2003. Organized by Stardust magazine, the award recognizes direction in the thriller and action genres. Winners are selected by the magazine's readers.

== Winners ==
Year	Director	Film	Actor	Actress	Ref.
2011	Abhinav Kashyap	Dabangg	Salman Khan	Sonakshi Sinha	
2013	Prabhu Deva	Rowdy Rathore	Akshay Kumar	Sonakshi Sinha	
2013	Ashish R Mohan	Khiladi 786	Akshay Kumar	Asin	
2013	Sujoy Ghosh	Kahaani	Nawazuddin Siddiqui	Vidya Balan	
2014	Farah Khan	Happy New Year	Shah Rukh Khan	Deepika Padukone	
2018	Milan Luthria	Baadshaho	Ajay Devgn	Ileana D'Cruz	

== See also ==
- Bollywood
- Cinema of India
