= Kahaani 2: Durga Rani Singh =

2016 Indian film by Sujoy Ghosh

- Theatrical release poster
- Directed by: Sujoy Ghosh
- Written by: Sujoy Ghosh; Ritesh Shah (dialogues)
- Screenplay by: Sujoy Ghosh
- Story by: Sujoy Ghosh; Suresh Nair
- Produced by: Sujoy Ghosh; Kushal Gada
- Starring: Vidya Balan; Arjun Rampal
- Cinematography: Tapan Tushar Basu
- Edited by: Namrata Rao
- Music by: Clinton Cerejo
- Production companies: Boundscript Motion Pictures; Pen Studios
- Distributed by: Pen Studios (India); Eros International (some overseas territories)
- Release date: 2 December 2016
- Running time: 128 minutes
- Country: India
- Language: Hindi
- Budget: ₹170 million
- Box office: est. ₹547 million

Kahaani 2: Durga Rani Singh, or simply Kahaani 2 (transl. 'Story 2'), is a 2016 Indian Hindi-language thriller film directed by Sujoy Ghosh, A spiritual sequel to the 2012 film Kahaani, the film features Vidya Balan and Arjun Rampal in lead roles, and Jugal Hansraj and Kharaj Mukherjee and Tunisha Sharma in supporting roles.

Principal photography took place from March 2016 to May 2016. The film was released on 2 December 2016. It was declared tax-free in Uttar Pradesh on 15 December 2016. At the 62nd Filmfare Awards, Balan received a Best Actress nomination for her performance.

== Plot ==
Vidya Sinha (Vidya Balan) is a middle-class working mother who lives in Chandannagar, West Bengal with her teenage daughter Minnie (Tunisha Sharma), who is paralyzed from the waist down and uses a wheelchair. Minnie is a happy child and Vidya dotes on her, working hard to save money so that she can take Minnie to the United States in the hope that the girl will walk again.

One evening, Vidya returns home to find her daughter is missing. She receives a call from an unknown man asking her to come to an address, or else Minnie will die. When Vidya crosses the road, a taxi knocks her down, sending her into a coma. The taxi driver takes her to a nursing home run by Dr. Maity (Pradip Mukherjee). Police Sub-Inspector Inderjeet Singh (Arjun Rampal) is put on Vidya's case. He visits Vidya's home and finds her diary, which he takes as evidence. Inderjeet's senior, Pranab Halder (Kharaj Mukherjee), informs him that a woman named Durga Rani Singh is wanted for a kidnapping and murder case.

As Inderjeet reads Vidya's diary, her past is revealed: She worked as a clerk in a school in Kalimpong as Durga Rani Singh, where she is friendly with Arun (Tota Roy Chowdhury), who has feelings for her. At school, Durga noticed that a student named Minnie Dewan (Naisha Khanna) was always punished for sleeping during classes. After repeated attempts at befriending the reclusive Minnie fail, Durga decides to visit the girl’s wealthy grandmother (Amba Sanyal), pretending to be offering Minnie extra tuition. Durga's worst fears come true when Minnie confides that her uncle Mohit Dewan (Jugal Hansraj) was sexually abusing her. Durga, also a survivor of child sex abuse, informs Minnie's grandmother but the woman admonishes her. Durga then tries to file a case with the police but an investigation by a police officer (Koushik Sen) finds Mohit innocent and he doesn't believe Durga. Minnie jumps off her house's terrace in desperation and becomes paralyzed from the waist down. A corrupt police officer (Gargi Bharadwaj), taking the side of Minnie's grandmother, threatens Durga not to pursue the matter. Durga decides to save Minnie from her family and has a fight with her grandmother, who is killed accidentally. Durga flees with Minnie, settling in Chandan Nagar with a new name, Vidya Sinha. Years later, Mohit hunts them down and kidnaps Minnie with the help of the policewoman.

In the present, the policewoman comes to the nursing home and threatens Vidya to pay ransom to save Minnie. Terrified, Vidya escapes from the hospital after recovering from her coma and returns home in search of the address that the kidnapper asked her to come to. She is caught by Halder and Inderjeet at her home but escapes after shooting Inderjeet in the arm. Vidya then arrives in Kolkata, where she goes to the docks as ordered by Mohit and offers to pay the ransom to the policewoman. Mohit shoots the policewoman when she takes interest in the ransom money and then tries to strangle Vidya as revenge, but is shot dead by Minnie, who picked up his fallen revolver. Vidya then calls Inderjeet to seek his help, but Haldar and other police officers ask Inderjeet to call her to a place where they can arrest her. Inderjeet asks Vidya to come to his paternal house, where they are surrounded by the police force. Halder tries to arrest Vidya, but she shoots him in the leg and later sets the house on fire.

It is revealed that Durga was married to Inderjeet at a very young age, but they separated later. After recovering from her coma, Durga asked Inderjeet for his help to save Minnie and they planned her escape. In the present, Inderjeet helps Durga escape to Kolkata in the police Ambassador's car by smuggling her in the trunk, and he helps her escape from the burning house. Inderjeet also arranged passports for Durga and her adopted daughter under their new identities.

In the end, Durga (who is believed to be dead by the police) is traveling to New York City for Minnie's operation. Inderjeet is seen happily driving with his family.

== Cast ==
- Vidya Balan as Vidya Sinha / Durga Rani Singh
- Arjun Rampal as Sub-inspector Inderjeet Singh also Durga's ex husband
- Tunisha Sharma as Minnie Dewan/Minnie Sinha
- Naisha Khanna as Young Minnie Dewan
- Jugal Hansraj as Mohit Dewan, Minnie's uncle
- Amba Sanyal as Mrs. Dewan (Mohit's mother)
- Manini Chadha as Rashmi Singh (Inderjeet Second Wife)
- Kharaj Mukherjee as Inspector Pranab Halder
- Tota Roy Chowdhury as Arun, Durga's friend
- Koushik Sen as the policeman at Kalimpong
- Pradip Chakrabarty as Benu Kaka, Vidya's neighbour
- Nitya Ganguli as Constable Ram Singh
- Pradip Mukherjee as Doctor Maity
- Ardhendu Banerjee as Doctor Sen
- Biswajit Chakraborty as Police Officer, Lalbazar
- Gargi Bharadwaj as the kidnapper assassin / police-woman
- Soma Adhikari as Minnie's nurse
- Haridas Chatterjee as mad beggar

== Production ==
In March 2012, Ghosh announced that he intended to develop Kahaani into a series. He was inspired by Satyajit Ray's Feluda detective series and wanted to continue the stories of Vidya Bagchi on similar lines, with Vidya Balan reprising the role. The shooting of Kahaani 2 was scheduled to begin in 2013, but in July 2013 problems arose between Sujoy Ghosh and other co-producers. In February 2014, Vidya announced that the film was not happening due to these arguments, but two years later, Ghosh confirmed that the film was in pre-production with Vidya set to reprise her role. The film, titled Kahaani 2, began filming in March 2016 with Arjun Rampal and Vidya in lead roles.

In October 2016, upon its teaser release, the film was renamed as Kahaani 2: Durga Rani Singh. Initially, Durga Rani Singh was intended to be a standalone film with actor Aishwarya Rai Bachchan, but, as the story is too similar to Kahaani franchise, makers has included the project as a sequel to Kahaani.

It was later revealed by Balan and Ghosh that, this film is not a sequel to Kahaani released in 2012, but a next installment of the Kahaani franchise.

The assistant film maker Shuvro Sagar Chakraborty from Bangladesh has worked as an assistant script writer of this Movie. In his personal life he is a school teacher in Dhaka, Narayonganj.

== Reception ==
=== Critical reception ===
Hindustan Times gave the film 4 stars out of five. The Times of India gave the film 3 and half stars out of five. India Today gave the film 2 and half stars out of five. The Indian Express gave the film 2 stars out of five. Firstpost gave the film 2 stars out of five.

=== Box office ===
On its first day, the film collected ₹42.5 million (US$440,000) from India, and, in its opening weekend, it grossed ₹169.7 million (US$1.8 million).

=== Award and nominations ===
Year	Award	Category	Recipient(s)	Result	Ref.
2017	Filmfare Awards	Best Actress	Vidya Balan	Nominated	
2017	Filmfare Awards	Best Costume Design	Darshan Jalan	Nominated	
2017	Zee Cine Awards	Best Actress (Critics)	Vidya Balan	Nominated	

== Soundtrack ==
Kahaani 2: Durga Rani Singh

Soundtrack album by Clinton Cerejo
- Released: 2016
- Genre: Feature film soundtrack
- Label: Saregama

The music was composed by Clinton Cerejo.

All lyrics are written by Amitabh Bhattacharya except for "Anandoloke" song, which is a Rabindra Sangeet.

Kahaani 2
No.	Title	Singer(s)	Length
1.	"Mehram"	Arijit Singh	4:41
2.	"Lamhon Ke Rasgulle"	Sunidhi Chauhan, Bianca Gomes	3:21
3.	"Anandoloke"	Clinton Cerejo	3:05
4.	"Aaur Main Khush Hoon"	Ash King	3:49

== Third film ==
The producers have confirmed plans to release a third film in the Kahaani franchise.
