= Times of India Film Awards =

Film award

- Awarded for: Excellence in cinematic achievements
- Country: India
- Presented by: The Times of India
- First award: 6 April 2013
- Website: timesofindia.indiatimes.com/toifa

Television/radio coverage
- Network: Sony Entertainment Television (India) (2013-present)

The Times of India Film Awards (also known as TOIFA Awards) are presented by The Times of India to honour both the artistic and technical excellence of professionals in the Hindi language film industry of India. The awards were first introduced in 2013. The second edition of the award was held at Dubai on 18 March 2016.

== Editions ==
Ceremony	Date	City	Host(s)
1st TOIFA	6 April 2013	Vancouver, British Columbia, Canada	Ranbir Kapoor and Anushka Sharma
2nd TOIFA	19 September 2015	San Diego, United States	Salman Khan and Jacqueline Fernandez
3rd TOIFA	18 March 2016	Dubai, United Arab Emirates	Riteish Deshmukh and Parineeti Chopra

== Acting awards ==
=== Best Film ===
Year	Film	Producer
2013	Barfi!	Ronnie Screwvala; Siddharth Roy Kapoor
2021	Gully Boy

=== Best Actor Male ===
Year	Name	Film
2013	"Ranbir Kapoor"	Barfi!
2021	"Salman Khan"	Dabangg 3

=== Best Actor Female ===
Year	Name	Film
2013	"Priyanka Chopra"	Barfi!
2021	"Bhumi Pednekar"	Pati Patni Aur Woh

=== Best Director ===
Year	Name	Film
2013	"Anurag Basu"	Barfi!
2021	"Aditya Dhar"	Super 30

=== Best Supporting Actor Male ===
Year	Name	Film
2013	"Annu Kapoor"	Vicky Donor
2021	"Ayushmann Khurrana"	Bala

=== Best Supporting Actor Female ===
Year	Name	Film
2013	"Dolly Ahluwalia"	Vicky Donor
2021	"Kriti Sanon"	Housefull 4

=== Best Actor In A Comic Role ===
Year	Name	Film
2013	"Abhishek Bachchan"	Bol Bachchan
2021	"Kartik Aaryan"	Luka Chuppi

=== Best Actor In A Negative Role ===
Year	Name	Film
2013	"Rishi Kapoor"	Agneepath
2021	"Salman Khan"	Bharat

=== Best Debut Male ===
Year	Name	Film
2013	"Ayushmann Khurrana"	Vicky Donor
2021	"Siddhant Chaturvedi"	Gully Boy

=== Best Debut Female ===
Year	Name	Film
2013	"Ileana D'Cruz"	Barfi!
2021	"Ananya Pandey"	Student Of The Year 2

== Music awards ==
=== Best Album ===
Year	Name	Composer
2013	"Agneepath"	Ajay–Atul
2021	"Chhalaang"	Yo Yo Honey Singh, Guru Randhawa, Tanishk-Vayu

=== Song of The Year ===
Year	Song	Film	Composer
2013	"Abhi Mujh Mein Kahin"	Agneepath	Ajay–Atul
2021	"Teri Bhabhi"	Coolie No.1	Varun Dhawan

=== Best Playback Singer Male ===
Year	Name	Song	Film
2013	"Sonu Nigam"	"Abhi Mujh Mein Kahin"	Agneepath
2021	"Bappi Lahiri"	"Sab Kushal Mangal"	Sab Kushal Mangal

=== Best Playback Singer Female ===
Year	Name	Song	Film
2013	Shalmali Kholgade	"Pareshaan"	Ishaqzaade
2016	Shreya Ghoshal	"Mohe Rang Do Laal"	Bajirao Mastani

=== Best Lyricist ===
Year	Name	Song	Film
2013	"Gulzar"	"Saans"	Jab Tak Hai Jaan
2021	"Varun Dhawan"	Coolie No.1

=== Composer of The Year ===
Year	Name	Film
2013	"Ajay–Atul"	Agneepath
2021	"Ranveer Singh"	83

== Critics' awards ==
=== Best Film ===
Year	Film	Director
2013	"Gangs of Wasseypur"	Anurag Kashyap
2021	"Tanhaji: The Unsuring Warrior"	Om Raut

=== Best Actor Male ===
Year	Name	Film
2013	"Irrfan Khan"	Paan Singh Tomar
2021	"Amitabh Bachchan" and "Ayushmann Khurrana	Gulabo Sitabo

=== Best Actor Female ===
Year	Name	Film
2013	"Deepika Padukone"	Cocktail
2021	"Parineeti Chopra"	Sandeep Aur Pinky Faraar

=== Best Debut Director ===
Year	Name	Film
2013	"Gauri Shinde"	English Vinglish
2021	"Ramesh Sippy"	Shimla Mirchi

== Technical awards ==
=== Best Editing ===
Year	Name	Film
2013	"Namrata Rao"	Kahaani
2016	"A. Sreekar Prasad"	Talvar

=== Best Cinematography ===
Year	Name	Film
2013	"Ravi Varman"	Barfi!
2016	"Sudeep Chatterjee"	Bajirao Mastani

=== Best Choreography ===
Year	Name	Film
2013	"Ganesh Acharya"	Agneepath
2016	"Remo D'Souza"	ABCD 2

=== Best Background Score ===
Year	Name	Film
2013	"Pritam"	Barfi!

=== Best Special Effects ===
Year	Name	Film
2013	"Kvsanjit", "Rajiv Ghosh"	Raaz 3

=== Best Costume Design ===
Year	Name	Film
2013	"Aki Narula", "Shafalina"	Barfi!
2016	"Anju Modi", "Maxima Basu"	Bajirao Mastani

=== Best Art Direction ===
Year	Name	Film
2013	"Rajat Podar"	Barfi!
2016	"Sujeet Sawant", "Sriram Iyengar", "Saloni Dhatrak"

=== Best Action ===
Year	Name	Film
2013	"Conrad Palmisano", "Markos"	Ek Tha Tiger

=== Best Sound Recording ===
Year	Name	Film
2013	"Anita Khushwaha"	Talaash

=== Best Story ===
Year	Name	Film
2013	"Advaita Kala", "Sujoy Ghosh"	Kahaani
2016	"V. Vijayendra Prasad"	Bajrangi Bhaijaan

=== Best Screenplay ===
Year	Name	Film
2013	"Sujoy Ghosh"	Kahaani
2016	"Juhi Chaturvedi"	Piku

=== Best Dialogue ===
Year	Name	Film
2013	"Anurag Kashyap", "Akhilesh Jaiswal", "Zeishan Quadri", "Sachin Ladia"	Gangs of Wasseypur I
2016	"Himanshu Sharma"	Tanu Weds Manu Returns

== See also ==
- Bollywood
- Cinema of India
