= Advaita Kala =

Indian author, screenwriter, and columnist

- Born: Advaita Kala
- Occupations: Author, screenwriter

YouTube information
- Channel: Advaita Kala
- Subscribers: 58.7 thousand
- Views: 11.8 million
- Last updated: 13 October 2025

Advaita Kala is an Indian author, screenwriter, and columnist. She has written screenplays for films such as the romantic drama Anjaana Anjaani (2010) and the thriller Kahaani (2012). Apart from writing for films, Kala has also written two novels: Almost Single (2007) and Almost There! (2013).

== Biography ==
Kala's father is a former bureaucrat who retired as a secretary for the Government of India. Kala spent her childhood living in central Delhi. She attended Welham Girls' School.

She wrote her first novel Almost Single from the idea that germinated as a result of some of the experiences that surrounded her. Kala said: "The rapid way in which the concepts of love and courtship are evolving and continue to do so. Also the fact that the ‘hunt’ was not necessarily the fiefdom of the male of the species." Almost Single was a runaway bestseller and called "Bridget Jones in a saree" by the UK's The Independent. She quit the job of a hotel executive to write her next novel Almost There!, which was a sequel to her previous novel.

Director Siddharth Anand had approached Kala to develop the story of two suicidal strangers who fall in love into a feature-length script. Although a bit hesitant initially as she had not written a screenplay before, she accepted the offer. Intrigued by the premise of the story, Kala started sketching the characters over the next few days and began writing the script, which she found was different from writing novels. Anand helped her in understanding the process of writing screenplays and co-wrote with her. Kala wrote the first draft, approaching it like writing a book, and sent it as chapters to Anand, saying: "Writing a screenplay can also be a lonely process like writing a novel, but along the way when others get involved, it becomes a fun collaborative effort." The film, starring Priyanka Chopra and Ranbir Kapoor, proved to be a commercial success.

Sujoy Ghosh approached Kala with the idea for Kahaani, starring Vidya Balan. Kala took inspiration from her experience in Kolkata, where she had moved in 1999, akin to the protagonist in the film. She reported that despite facing a language barrier and the chaos and poverty of the metropolis, she was charmed by the warmth of the people, which was reflected in the film. Kala started writing in 2009 and finished the 185-page script by February 2010. Her research included reading the books Open Secrets: India's Intelligence Unveiled by Maloy Krishna Dhar and India's External Intelligence: Secrets of Research and Analysis Wing (RAW) by V. K. Singh. Made on a budget of ₹80 million (US$830,000), Kahaani grossed over ₹1.04 billion (US$11 million) worldwide after a 50-day theatrical run. The film proved to be a critical success as well and garnered several awards and nominations. Kala won the Screen Award for Best Story, Star Guilds Award for Best Story and Zee Cine Award for Best Story along with Ghosh.

Apart from writing for films and novels, Kala has also written the television serial Airplane which aired on Star Plus. She writes a regular hospitality column for the Financial Express called Epicuriosity and has regular columns in the Financial Chronicle and on Yahoo as well as in Dainik Jagran. She also writes a regular column for the Dhaka Tribune.

== Philanthropy ==
During the COVID-19 pandemic in India, Kala ran a community kitchen, called Janta Rasoi, in Gurugram since the Janta Curfew was announced, to feed the poor in the city who have been the most affected by the lockdown.

== Filmography ==
=== As screenwriter ===
Year	Title
2010	Anjaana Anjaani
2012	Kahaani

== Bibliography ==
- Almost Single (2007), HarperCollins India, ISBN 8172236557
- Almost There! (2013), HarperCollins India, ISBN 9351361500
