= Bob Biswas =

2021 Indian film by Diya Annapurna Ghosh

- Official release poster
- Directed by: Diya Annapurna Ghosh
- Written by: Sujoy Ghosh
- Dialogue by: Raj Vasant
- Produced by: Gauri Khan; Sujoy Ghosh; Gaurav Verma
- Starring: Abhishek Bachchan; Chitrangada Singh; Paran Banerjee
- Cinematography: Gairik Sarkar
- Edited by: Yasha Ramchandani
- Music by: Songs: Vishal–Shekhar; Anupam Roy; Clinton Cerejo; Bianca Gomes; Background Score: Clinton Cerejo
- Production companies: Red Chillies Entertainment; Boundscript
- Distributed by: ZEE5
- Release date: 3 December 2021
- Running time: 131 minutes
- Country: India
- Language: Hindi

Bob Biswas is a 2021 Indian Hindi-language action thriller film directed by debutante Diya Annapurna Ghosh. A spin-off to the 2012 thriller Kahaani, it stars Abhishek Bachchan as the titular character (played by Saswata Chatterjee in the original). The film premiered on ZEE5 on 3 December 2021 and received mixed reviews from the critics.

== Plot ==
After being hit by a vehicle while being chased during the events of Kahaani, Bob Biswas has woken up from a coma after eight years and does not remember anything even his wife Mary Biswas and children Mini Biswas & Benny Biswas. Two officers from Kolkata Police, Jishu Narang and Kharaj Sahu are keeping an eye on Bob Biswas because unknown to Bob and his family, Bob is actually an assassin.

After recruiting Bob to be an exclusive assassin to work for them, they give Bob a flip phone on which photos of Bob's targets will be shared. Meanwhile, Mini is addicted to a drug called Blue that is distributed by Bubai Da and his boss Ustaad. After Jishu Narang and Kharaj Sahu send Bob's first target photo, Bob visits a homoeopathy pharmacist Kali Da and receives a pistol disguised as Nux Vomica. Bob then kills his first target Bubai and two of his men. He then leaves for home and meets Mini on his way, who bought Blue from Bubai, a fact unknown to Bob. Bob's second target is Ustaad's investor Rahul who is an undercover police officer investigating Ustaad's illegal activities. Police officer Indira Verma starts investigating the murders of Bubai and Rahul.

After inquiring about Bob, Indira suspects the former and starts keeping an eye on him. On other hand, Ustaad has his henchman Dhonu investigate the murders. Dhonu is close to the Biswas family and is on friendly terms with Bob who visits his noodle stand frequently. While visiting Mary's first husband and Mini's father David's grave, Bob remembers that he has hidden a diary containing names of targets killed, who gave the target and money transactions. With that diary, he finds an unknown key. Bob's third target is Indira's boss but Bob does not kill her after meeting Indira who tells Bob that her boss is instrumental in fighting the drug mafia. Jishu Narang and Kharaj Sahu pay a visit to Bob and enquires as to why he did not kill his third target, to that Bob tells he will not continue on the path and if they force him, he will go to Indira Verma with the diary. Jishu Narang and Kharaj Sahu go to Boss who is a deputy of Indira's boss. Bob visits Kali Da to return Nux Vormica and enquire about the key to this Kali then takes Bob to the trunk room deeper inside his shop and points out Bob his trunk. Inside Bob finds a carrier bag full of cash and becomes happy that now Bob and his family can leave happily in Kalimpong.

Bob pays his dues to Kali Da and returns home. It is revealed that Boss, Jishu and Kharaj are associated with Ustaad. Boss provides Ustaad with a polaroid picture of Bob who has been killing associates of Ustaad. Ustaad contracts Dhonu to kill Bob but Dhonu immediately rejects and is instantly killed by one of the Ustaad's henchmen. Two of Ustaad's henchmen visit Bob in his home at night and torture him, breaking his right hand and killing Mary and Benny in the fighting process. Bob manages to kill both men. Bob is then arrested by Indira but is released as ordered by Indira's boss. Bob visits Jishu and Kharaj and kills Kharaj when enquiring about Ustaad. Jishu takes Bob to Ustaad where Bob kills several of Ustaad's henchmen. Ustaad also known as Doctor Uncle then presents Mini who is now addicted to Blue. Ustaad tells her to kill Bob in exchange for a stash of Blue so she can pass in exams and become a doctor. In the process, Ustaad agrees to have ordered the murder of Mary and Benny and after a struggling fight Bob finally kills Ustaad. Six months later, Bob and Mini visit Mary & Benny's graves and do not talk much as Mini is still angry and unforgiving towards Bob for what happened. After Mini leaves, Bob receives a photo of his new target on his phone, which he happily accepts.

== Cast ==
- Abhishek Bachchan as Bob Biswas
- Chitrangada Singh as Mary Biswas
- Samara Tijori as Mini Biswas, Bob's Daughter
- Ronit Arora as Benny Biswas, Bob's Son
- Purab Kohli as Bubai (special appearance)
- Kaushik Chakraborty as Ustaad, boss of Bubai
- Paran Bandopadhyay as Kali Krishna Paul aka Kali Da
- Barun Chanda as Priest
- Bhanu Uday as Jishu Narang
- Amar Upadhyay as Souvik Das
- Kanchan Mullick as Singing Neighbour
- Ditipriya Roy as Tina, Mini's friend
- Pabitra Rabha as Dhonu
- Rajatabha Dutta as boss of Kharaj and Jishu
- Tina Desai as Indira Verma
- Karanuday Jenjani as David
- Vishwanath Chatterjee as Kharaj Sahu
- Kunal Verma as Rahul
- Piyush Lalwani as Ishaan
- Sharad Joshi as Shontu
- Yusuf Hussain as Dr. Mehta

Additionally, Vidya Balan appears as Vidya Bagchi from Kahaani in a photographic cameo.

== Production ==
The official announcement for Bob Biswas was made by Red Chillies Entertainment on 25 November 2019, with Abhishek Bachchan playing Biswas and the film serving as spin-off to the 2012 thriller Kahaani. It is produced by Gauri Khan and Gaurav Verma via Shah Rukh Khan's Red Chillies Entertainment alongside Sujoy Ghosh's Bound Script Production, and directed by debutante Diya Annapurna Ghosh. In January 2020, the makers cast Chitrangada Singh as the lead actress. The film went on floors on 24 January 2020. The first schedule wrapped on 18 February 2020 The film was wrapped up on 10 December 2020.

== Soundtrack ==
Bob Biswas

Soundtrack album by Vishal–Shekhar, Anupam Roy, Clinton Cerejo and Bianca Gomes
- Released: 1 December 2021
- Recorded: 2021
- Genre: Feature film soundtrack
- Length: 11:39
- Language: Hindi
- Label: Zee Music Company

Official audio
- Bob Biswas - Full Album on YouTube

The film's music was composed by Vishal–Shekhar, Anupam Roy, Clinton Cerejo and Bianca Gomes while lyrics written by Vishal Dadlani and Siddhant Kaushal.

Track listing
No.	Title	Lyrics	Music	Singer(s)	Length
1.	"Tu Toh Gaya Re"	Vishal Dadlani	Vishal–Shekhar	Bianca Gomes	2:28
2.	"Mujhe Mujhse Kaun Bachayega"	Siddhant Kaushal	Anupam Roy	KK	3:14
3.	"Jaanoon Na"	Siddhant Kaushal	Clinton Cerejo, Bianca Gomes	Bianca Gomes	2:54
4.	"Teeja"	Siddhant Kaushal	Clinton Cerejo, Bianca Gomes	Yash Kapoor	3:03
Total length:					11:39

== Reception ==
The film received mixed reviews from the critics. Hiren Kotwani of The Times Of India gave the film a rating of 3.5/5 and wrote "Even though there are a couple of loopholes and Bob Biswas is not as brilliant as Kahaani, it's nonetheless an interesting thriller you must watch". Aman Wadhwa of DNA India rated the film 3.5/5 and wrote "'Bob Biswas' rides on Abhishek Bachchan's captivating performance and must be seen for its gripping plot, effective direction, and original story". Suparna Sharma of Deccan Chronicle gave the film 3/5 and wrote "I wasn't expecting to like Bob Biswas the film. In fact, I was all ready to dislike Abhishek Bachchan for playing a character that, in all fairness, belonged to a Bengali actor". Taran Adarsh of Bollywood Hungama rated the film 3/5 and wrote "BOB BISWAS boasts is an interesting thriller with a fine script, impeccable direction, and good performances". Devesh Sharma of Filmfare rated the film 3/5 and wrote "It's a layered portrayal by Abhishek and can be counted as one of his best performances so far".

Saibal Chatterjee of NDTV rated the film 2.5/5 and wrote "The protagonist has no remembrance of things past. The audience does have memories of the crackling Kahaani. Comparisons are inevitable. The expectations remain largely unfulfilled". Shubhra Gupta of The Indian Express gave the film 2.5/5 and wrote "Every time Abhishek Bachchan gets a killing flare in his eyes, he makes us look. But parts of the plot are predictable and flat". Anuj Kumar of The Hindu wrote "Despite his earnestness to play a challenging part, two hours is a short time to accept Abhishek Bachchan as Bob Biswas and erase Saswata Chatterjee from memory in this spin-off of ‘Kahaani’.

== Accolades ==
Year	Award	Category	Nominee(s)	Result	Ref.
67th Filmfare Awards	30 August 2022	Best Actor Critics'	Abhishek Bachchan	Nominated	
67th Filmfare Awards	30 August 2022	Best Supporting Actor	Paran Bandopadhyay	Nominated	
67th Filmfare Awards	30 August 2022	Best Background Score	Clinton Cerejo, Bianca Gomes and Shor Police	Nominated	
