= Zee Cine Critics Award for Best Film =

Annual film award in India

- Awarded for: Best Film
- Country: India
- Presented by: Zee Entertainment Enterprises
- First award: Iqbal (2006)
- Currently held by: Saiyaara (film) (2026)

The Zee Cine Award Best Film is chosen by the Jury. The winners are announced in March.

== Multiple wins ==
Wins	Recipient
2	Karan Johar

== Winners ==
Year	Film	Producer
2006	Iqbal	Subhash Ghai
2008	Gandhi, My Father	Anil Kapoor
2011	Udaan	Anurag Kashyap
2012	The Dirty Picture	Ekta Kapoor
2013	Kahaani	Sujoy Ghosh
2014	Bhaag Milkha Bhaag	Rakeysh Omprakash Mehra
2015	Kick	Sajid Nadiadwala
2016	Bajirao Mastani	Sanjay Leela Bhansali
2017	Pink	Shoojit Sircar
2018	Golmaal Again	Rohit Shetty
2019	Raazi	Karan Johar
2023	Brahmāstra	Karan Johar
2024	Jawan	Gauri Khan
2026	Saiyaara (film)	
