= Stardust Award for Best Actress in a Thriller or Action =

Film award in India

The Stardust Best Thriller/Action Actress is chosen by the readers of the annual Stardust (magazine). The award honours a Bollywood actor that has made an impact with their acting in that certain film.

Here is a list of the award winners and the films for which they won.

Year	Winner	Film
2011	Vidya Balan	Ishqiya
2012	Bipasha Basu	Dum Maaro Dum
2013	Vidya Balan	Kahaani
2014	no award	no award
2015	Rani Mukerji	Mardaani

== See also ==
- Stardust Awards
- Bollywood
- Cinema of India
