= Namrata Rao =

Indian film editor

- Born: 17 June 1981 (age 44); Kochi, Kerala, India
- Occupation: Film editor
- Years active: 2008–present

Namrata Rao (born 17 June 1981) is an Indian film editor in Hindi cinema. As an editor, she has worked on films such as Oye Lucky! Lucky Oye! (2008), Ishqiya (2010), Band Baaja Baaraat (2010), Ladies vs Ricky Bahl (2011) and Kahaani (2012). In 2011, she received the Filmfare Award for Best Editing for Love Sex Aur Dhokha (2010), and the National Film Award for Best Editing and Filmfare Award for Best Editing for Kahaani (2012). She also directed the 2024 documentary, Angry Young Men.

== Early life and education ==
Namrata Rao was born to a Konkani family in Kochi, Kerala, India but grew up in Delhi. She obtained a bachelor's degree in IT, then studied at the Satyajit Ray Film and Television Institute where she completed a three-year course in film editing.

== Filmography ==
Director

- Angry Young Men (2024) - Documentary

Editor

- Oye Lucky! Lucky Oye! (2008)
- Ishqiya (2010)
- Love Sex Aur Dhokha (2010)
- Band Baaja Baaraat (2010)
- With Love, Delhi! (2011)
- Ladies vs Ricky Bahl (2011)
- Kahaani (2012)
- Life Ki Toh Lag Gayi (2012)
- Shanghai (2012)
- Jab Tak Hai Jaan (2012)
- 2 States (2014)
- Titli (2014)
- Katiyabaaz (2014) - Documentary
- Detective Byomkesh Bakshy! (2015)
- Fan (2016)
- Kahaani 2: Durga Rani Singh (2016)
- Befikre (2016)
- Anukul (2017)
- Lust Stories (2018) - Anthology film
- Made in Heaven (2019) - Television series
- Ghost Stories (2020) - Web series
- Mismatched (2020) - Television series
- House of Secrets: The Burari Deaths (2021) - Documentary series
- Jayeshbhai Jordaar (2022)
- Mrs. Chatterjee vs Norway (2023)

== Awards ==
Winner:

Year	Award	Category	Film
2012	National Film Awards	Best Editing	Kahaani
2011	Filmfare Awards	Best Editing	Love Sex aur Dhokha
2013	Filmfare Awards	Best Editing	Kahaani
2011	IIFA Awards	Best Editing	Band Baaja Baaraat
2013	IIFA Awards	Best Editing	Kahaani
2011	Colors Screen Awards	Best Editing	Band Baaja Baaraat
2013	Colors Screen Awards	Best Editing	Kahaani
2013	Zee Cine Awards	Best Editing	Kahaani
2013	Times of India Film Awards	Best Editing	Kahaani
