= Anjaana Anjaani =

2010 Indian film by Siddharth Anand

- Theatrical release poster
- Directed by: Siddharth Anand
- Screenplay by: Siddharth Anand; Advaita Kala
- Dialogues by: Siddharth Anand
- Story by: Mamta Anand
- Produced by: Sajid Nadiadwala
- Starring: Ranbir Kapoor; Priyanka Chopra
- Cinematography: Ravi K. Chandran
- Edited by: Rameshwar S. Bhagat
- Music by: Songs: Vishal–Shekhar; Score: Salim–Sulaiman
- Production company: Nadiadwala Grandson Entertainment
- Distributed by: Eros International
- Release date: 1 October 2010
- Running time: 147 minutes
- Country: India
- Language: Hindi
- Budget: ₹38 crore
- Box office: ₹69.85 crore

Anjaana Anjaani (transl. "Strangers") is a 2010 Indian Hindi-language romantic comedy-drama film written directed by Siddharth Anand and produced by Sajid Nadiadwala under the banner Nadiadwala Grandson Entertainment. The film stars Ranbir Kapoor and Priyanka Chopra as two suicidal strangers who meet and make a pact to commit suicide in 20 days on New Year's Eve. In the interim, the couple fulfils their personal wishes and eventually falls in love. The soundtrack of the film, composed by Vishal–Shekhar and lyrics by various artists including the duo themselves, received widespread critical acclaim and was a major commercial success. The film was promoted with the tag-line "All The Greatest Love Stories Are Between Strangers."

Wanting to make an unusual romance film, Anand struggled with several ideas to the initial effect of disappointment until his wife, Mamta, proposed an idea based on a scene which encouraged him to work on the idea with a different approach. Anand approached novelist Advaita Kala who developed the story into a feature-length script, and later co-wrote the screenplay with him. Principal photography, handled by Ravi K. Chandran, was conducted entirely in New York City, Las Vegas and San Francisco, with Rameshwar S. Bhagat serving as editor.

Made on a production and marketing budget of ₹38 crore, Anjaana Anjaani was released on 1 October 2010 and grossed over ₹69.8 crore at the box office, thus emerging as a commercial success. The film received mixed-to-positive reviews from critics, with praise for its novel concept, music, cinematography, humor, costumes and the leads' performances, but criticism for its screenplay and pacing. At the 56th Filmfare Awards, it received a nomination for Best Music Director for Vishal-Shekhar.

== Plot ==
Akash lives in New York City; he has bankrupted his company and is in need of $12 million for paying the shareholders, but is unable to obtain a loan due to a stock market crash. He decides to jump off the George Washington Bridge. He meets Kiara, from San Francisco, who is also suicidal after catching her fiancé Kunal cheating on her. Akash and Kiara attempt to kill themselves, but are prevented from doing so by the Coast Guard. Still suicidal, Akash deliberately allows himself to be hit by a car, and Kiara falls on the bridge and breaks her neck. They survive their suicide attempts, and end up in hospital together. When they are discharged, Kiara takes Akash to her apartment because his house has been seized by the bank.

The pair try to kill themselves five times, failing each time. Eventually, they make a pact to end their lives on 31 December 2009. With 20 days left before their deadline, they decide to fulfill their unrealised wishes and begin a journey together. Kiara helps Akash find a date and shares with him how Kunal cheated on her. The next day, Akash cleans Kiara's messy apartment. Though he cannot swim, Akash is forced to fulfil Kiara's wish to swim in the cold Atlantic Ocean. However, at sea Kiara falls overboard and Akash rescues her. Their yacht drifts away, stranding them. As the two slowly succumb to hypothermia, Kiara continues telling her story to Akash. They are rescued again by the Coast Guard who intervened on the bridge.

After returning to land, Kiara's depression continues. She attempts to kill herself by drinking bleach and is rushed to hospital. After she is discharged, Akash realises his love for her, and tries everything to make her happy. The two venture to Las Vegas, as Akash has never gone on a holiday, and they end up in bed together. Kiara tells Akash that she still loves Kunal. Akash insists that she move back in with her parents and give Kunal a second chance. He moves in with his friend and colleague Deven, and plans to return to India on the night of 31 December to start afresh.

Akash attends the bank settlement and reconciles with several friends with whom he had fallen out, including his best friend Gaurav, as well as with his estranged father. Meanwhile, Kiara cannot stop thinking about Akash, and on the 31st she realises that she has fallen for him. Kunal discovers this and drops Kiara off at the airport. She reaches the bridge, but finds herself alone, believing she will never see Akash again. Just then he arrives. The pair go out to sea to die. Akash throws a beer bottle with a note in it, which Kiara gets and reads before he proposes to her. Surprised, she accepts, and the couple share a kiss while the Coast Guard rescues them. As the credits roll, Akash and Kiara are shown 2 years later, married with their 2 year old son.

== Cast ==
The cast is listed below:

- Ranbir Kapoor as Akash Khanna
- Priyanka Chopra as Kiara Kapoor
- Zayed Khan as Kunal Nanda
- Vishal Malhotra as Gaurav Bahl, Akash’s friend
- Joy Sengupta as Deven
- Pooja Kumar as Peshto
- Tanvi Azmi as the Doctor
- Kumar Pallana as the Coast Guard
- Nakul Kamte as Kiara's dad
- Sucheta Khanna as Sapna, Deven's wife
- Edward Sonnenblick as Emmanuel

== Production ==
=== Development ===
After having directed three back-to-back romantic comedies, namely Salaam Namaste (2005), Ta Ra Rum Pum (2007) and Bachna Ae Haseeno (2008) (also starring Ranbir Kapoor in the lead), Siddharth Anand wanted his next film to be a romantic comedy-drama, yet different from the usual films which were being made at the time. Anand felt he had run out of plot ideas, believing he was writing just "another story". His wife Mamta then came up with the core narrative concept about "two suicidal strangers meeting and falling in love", on the basis of the 2008 Bengali film Mon Mane Na. Anand revealed that this changed his viewpoint, saying: "It was a scene that got me completely excited and we started writing immediately. It is a scene that dictates the story."

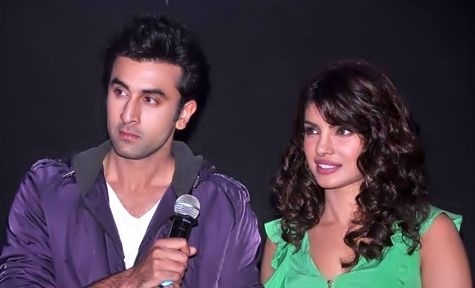
Ranbir Kapoor and Priyanka Chopra were in talks to star together in another film by Siddharth Anand and Sajid Nadiadwala, which did not happen.

Anand then approached novelist Advaita Kala to develop the story into a feature-length script. Although a bit hesitant, she accepted the offer. Intrigued by the premise of the story, Kala started sketching the characters over the next few days, and began writing the script, which she found very different from writing novels. Anand helped her understand the process of writing screenplays and co-wrote with her. Kala wrote the first draft, approaching it like writing a book, and sent it as chapters to Anand, saying: "Writing a screenplay can also be a lonely process like writing a novel, but along the way when others get involved, it becomes a fun, collaborative effort."

In an interview with the Deccan Herald, Anand talked about how the American sitcom Friends influenced the film's two characters revealing he wanted viewers to respond to the titular characters in a similar way. He said: "I remember when I watched Friends I wanted to meet and know every character. That's how I want audiences to feel about Kiara and Akash." He also wanted the two to resonate with the audience the way the characters in Dilwale Dulhania Le Jayenge (1995) did. In another interview discussing the film, Anand revealed that he wanted to make it different from his earlier films, aiming for it to be a "subdued romance", which is not sexy. He said: "Everyone is going to be covered up in scarves and mufflers and trench coats and boots. This is a rare instance that you’ll see Indian actors dressed full up without skin show."(sic) In September 2009, it was announced that Sajid Nadiadwala would produce the film as he was highly impressed by the script.

Priyanka Chopra and Ranbir Kapoor were the original choices for the film and their casting was confirmed by Anand in August 2009. After Chopra had starred earlier in Nadiadwala's Mujhse Shaadi Karogi (2004), both had wanted to work together again, but nothing had materialized. Much later, Nadiadwala reached out to her to discuss a film he was developing with Anand and Kapoor. Chopra met Anand to discuss the script, but the project did not work out. Later when Nadiadwala approached her again with the script of Anjaana Anjaani, Chopra accepted the role. Manish Malhotra designed Chopra's clothes, while Mamta Anand designed Kapoor's. Salim-Sulaiman composed the background score, while Rameshwar S. Bhagat edited the film.

=== Filming ===
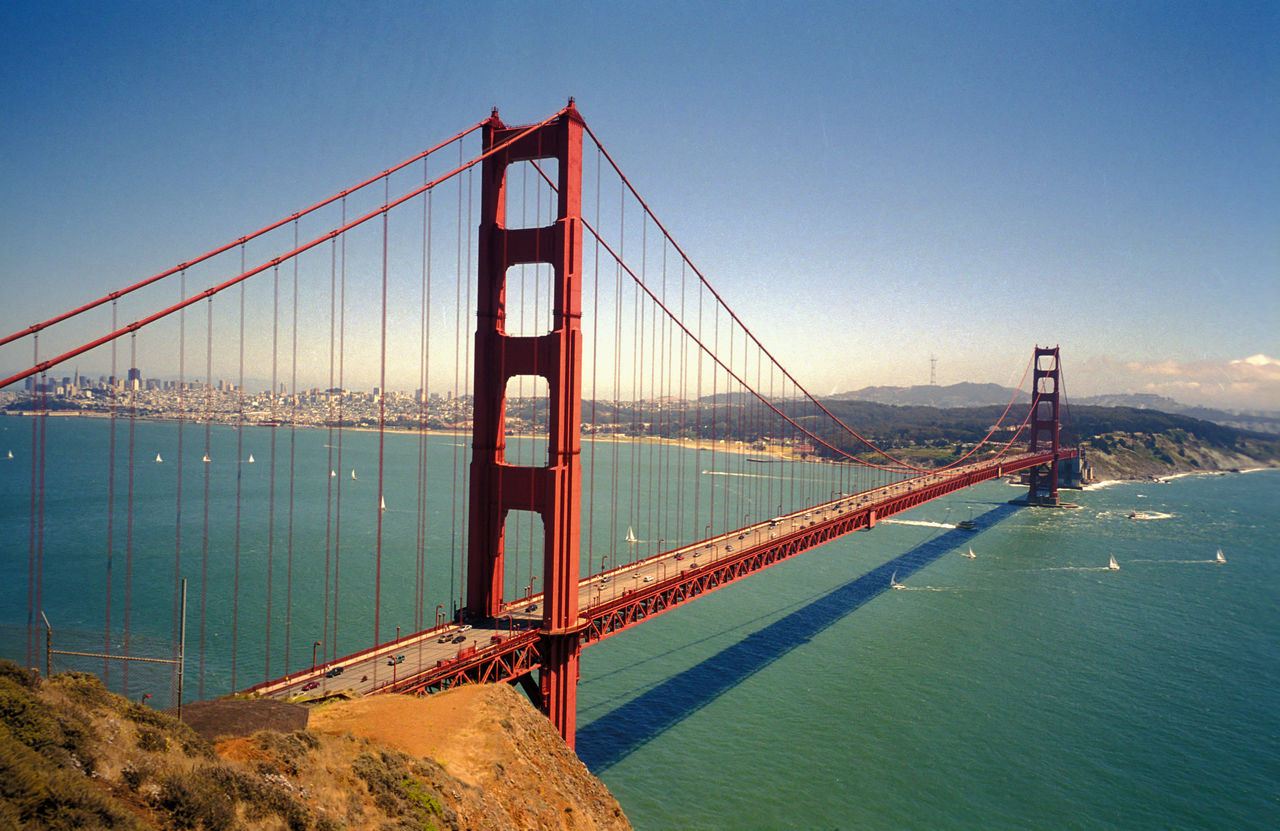
The film's opening suicide attempt scene features the 2 characters at the Golden Gate Bridge.

Principal photography began in New York City in late December 2009. The setting of the film required filming in winter during the festive season of Christmas leading up to New Year's Eve. Ravi K. Chandran handled the cinematography, while Sharmishta Roy handled the film's production design. Filming was done in various locations in New York City, Las Vegas and San Francisco. Anand wanted to capture the distinct flavor of each city.

Anand selected the cities to augment the characters' backgrounds. San Francisco was chosen to depict Chopra's character, Kiara, as he thought it was "the right backdrop to highlight her life and character". He chose New York City for Kapoor's character, Akash. Anand described "Blush", the car driven by Chopra's character, as the film's third lead character as it is featured extensively. After going through several car options, he chose a vintage red 1963 Ford Falcon Sprint, which was later purchased especially for the film as Anand thought the car should represent all of Kiara's attributes. This allowed the art director to modify the car's interior with a lot of detailing to suit Kiara's character.

The ice-skating scenes were filmed at Wollman Rink in Central Park, requiring the rink to close to the public for three consecutive days. Some scenes with the leads were also shot at Cafe Lalo, the same restaurant where When Harry Met Sally... (1989) was shot. The film was also shot at the Rockfeller Center. The producers had earlier scouted for a public bridge in India that they could use for four days, but due to the 2008 Mumbai attacks obtaining permission from the local government was difficult. The search ended in Kuala Lumpur, where a scene of Kiara and Akash attempting suicide was shot. The opening suicide attempt sequence was filmed at the Golden Gate Bridge. Several scenes were shot in Las Vegas, Nevada. Additional filming was done in Malaysia and Thailand.

Ahmed Khan handled the song choreography of the film. In June 2010, it was announced that a new song would be shot for the film. Shooting ended in July 2010 after filming for the club track was completed. In September 2010, a promotional video for the remix ballad version of "Tujhe Bhula Diya" was shot in Film City, Mumbai.

== Soundtrack ==
The soundtrack was composed by the duo Vishal–Shekhar and consists of nine compositions – seven original, and a remix and an unplugged version of two original songs. The lyrics are written by: Neelesh Misra, Vishal Dadlani, Shekhar Ravjiani, Amitabh Bhattacharya, Anvita Dutt Guptan, Kumaar, Kausar Munir and Irshad Kamil. The vocals were performed by: Nikhil D'Souza, Monali Thakur, Lucky Ali, Rahat Fateh Ali Khan, Shekhar Ravjiani, Caralisa Monteiro, Mohit Chauhan, Shruti Pathak, Vishal Dadlani, Shilpa Rao and Abhijit Vaghani. The album was released on 27 August 2010 by T-Series.

== Release ==
Anjaana Anjaani was one of the most anticipated films of the year due to the debut pairing of the lead actors. Exclusive stills from the film were released to the media on 4 October 2010. Chopra released a one-minute teaser trailer on 6 August 2010 on her Twitter account. It received positive feedback from critics and audiences, many calling it "promising" and "intriguing". The Indian Express wrote: "In a single minute, it has pretty much managed to convey the fun mood of this Sajid Nadiadwala-production which appears to come with a good mix of a new storyline, fresh new pairing, catchy music, high production values and a distinct touch of director Siddharth Anand." Following the teaser release, the first trailer appeared on 9 August 2010. The film's first song was released around the same time.

Anjaana Anjaani was initially slated to release on 24 September 2010. It was postponed by one week, just 4 days before the expected date because this would coincide with the controversial Ayodhya dispute verdict, which many anticipated would be disputed and cause chaos in the country. Trade experts were against postponing the film, and questioned Nadiadwala's decision, as the government had already taken precautionary measures with the Commonwealth Games around the corner. They also felt that the postponement would send mixed signals and confuse viewers as the promotional campaign centered around the 25 September release. Additionally, the film would lose the advantage of being the only new release. Changing the release date would mean Anjaana Anjaani would clash with the big-budget science fiction film Enthiran starring Rajinikanth and Aishwarya Rai, which might affect the film's box-office performance. Despite this, the film was postponed to 1 October 2010. Later, the Ayodhya verdict was itself postponed to 3 days before the film's new release date. Industry insiders started speculating again about the film's release being postponed by another week, causing rumours to spread in the media. However, Sajid Nadiadwala confirmed that the news was false and the film was releasing on 1 October 2010.

Made on a production and marketing budget of ₹380 million, Anjaana Anjaani immediately recovered ₹430 million, slightly more than its entire budget, before its release. This included ₹220 million from satellite rights, ₹80 million from music rights, and ₹130 million from distribution sales in territories other than Mumbai and Delhi, where the film was distributed directly by Eros. Bollywood Hungama noted that "the revenue generated from these territories, besides home video, will add to the profits of the film". The film's box office revenue on its opening day was ₹80 million. The film made over ₹257 million at the domestic box office and a further US$1.7 million from overseas, for a worldwide opening weekend of over ₹382 million. During its theatrical run, the film grossed over ₹544 million in India, and over US$3.1 million in the overseas market, for a total of ₹685 million. The film was declared as a semi-hit by Box Office India.

Distributed by Eros International, Anjaana Anjaani was released on DVD on 16 November 2010 in all regions on a single NTSC-format disc. The film's Video CD was released at the same time. A 2-disc DVD edition was also released later, which included a poster autographed by Chopra and Kapoor.

== Reception ==
=== Critical response ===
Anjaana Anjaani received mixed reviews from critics, with praise for its novel concept, music, cinematography, humor, costumes and the leads' performances and chemistry, but criticism for its screenplay and pacing.

Taran Adarsh of Bollywood Hungama gave Anjaana Anjaani a rating of 4 out of 5, calling it "a must-see for its interpretation of modern-day romance... Anjaana Anjaani is an unpretentious romantic saga that revels in the exuberance of newly-found love." He also highly praised the cinematography, styling and cast performances, writing: "The film bears a magnificent look all through and the panoramic and exotic locales of America only make every frame stand out." Daily News and Analysis gave it a rating of 3.5 out of 5, saying that it stood apart from "other done-to-death rom-coms in Hindi cinema in the sheer exclusivity of its screenplay and the way the subject is developed ... Here, at last, is a romantic comedy-drama from Bollywood that actually does what rom-coms are supposed to do. Anjaana Anjaani tugs at your heartstrings while at the same time tickling your funny bone." The review also praised Chopra's performance as "engagingly brilliant".

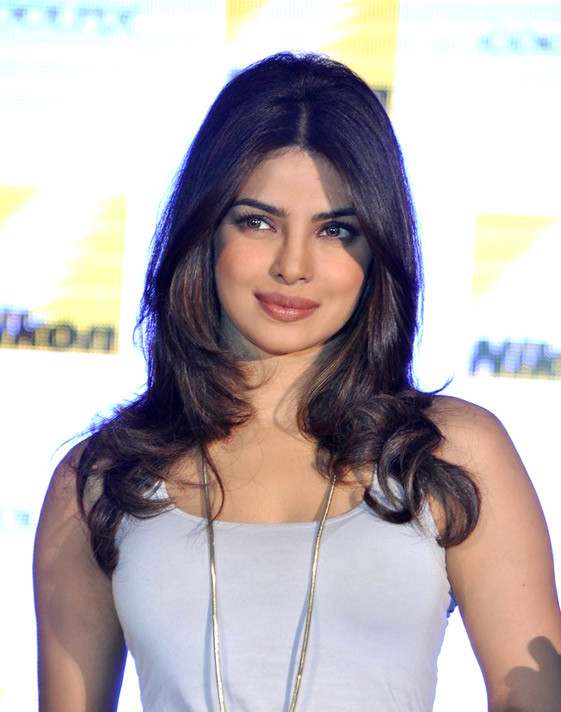
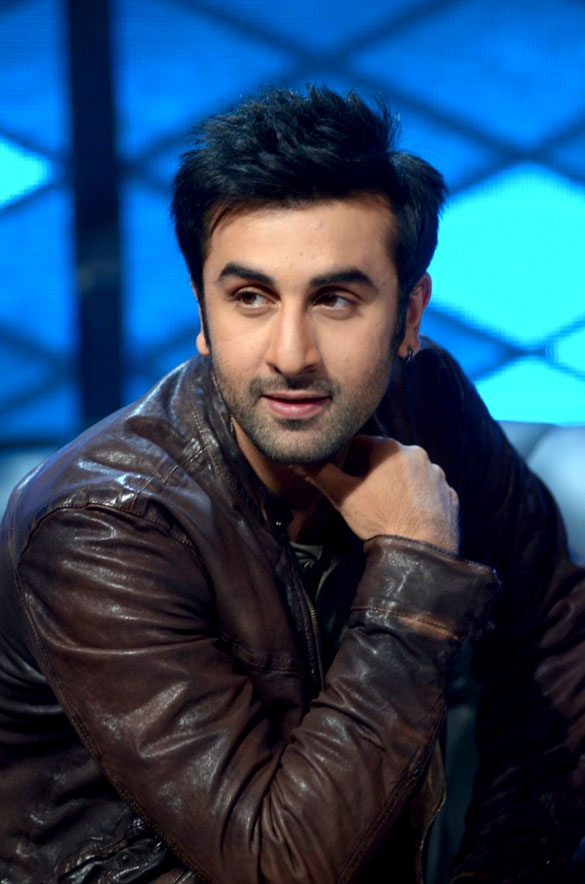
Priyanka Chopra and Ranbir Kapoor received critical acclaim for their performances in the film.

The Times of India gave the film a score of 3 out of 5, praising the lead pair and their chemistry as "vibrant, spontaneous, and finely nuanced." However, it criticized the script and narrative for being trite, saying that "all it promises is some fun moments, a peppy music score by Vishal-Shekhar, [and] alluring performances by Chopra and Kapoor." Subhash K. Jha wrote another positive review, saying that the film "sets off a tender saucy engaging trip. It somewhere loses its way, but still gets to its targeted destination because of the lead players who appear to know all the signposts and U-turns." He particularly cited Chopra's performance as "redeeming the film's flaws", noting that she provided a strong match to Kapoor's talent. Sarita Tanwar of Mid-Day gave a rating of 3 out of 5, noting that although the film might not be "a complicated love story, it's still heartfelt and even heartbreaking at times ... A film of this kind is largely dependent on the screenplay and the chemistry between the lead pair. That's what makes [it] unique in its own way and rather different from what you've seen in the year so far."

Sonia Chopra from Sify also rated the film 3 out of 5, noting that the characters were "written with an over-the-top quirky edge which adds to the fun." She also praised the lead pair's performance writing that "Chopra maintains her cool, effortless acting style and her comic timing is a revelation. Kapoor is suitably restrained and, at times, in keeping with his reticent character, often overshadowed by Chopra's exuberance. Together, the pair is eminently watchable, balancing each other's dispositions nicely." Shubhra Gupta of The Indian Express gave the film 2.5 out of 5, complimenting the lead performers who "play well together", but are forced to "boost a partly-limp story." India Today also scored it 2.5 out of 5, calling it "a pastiche of a pastiche ... The comedy is restricted to usual [...] jokes that find their way into most Bollywood comedies."

Writing for NDTV, Anupama Chopra gave the film 2 out of 5, criticizing the slow screenplay and artificial characters who "are supposed to be unemployed, lonely, and desperately sad, but they always look like they've stepped out of the pages of a fashion magazine, which could have been overlooked if there was any depth in their angst, but these two seem like spoilt kids playing suicide-suicide." Rajeev Masand of News18 was also critical of the film, calling it "deathly boring [and] a challenge to sit through for two reasons in particular – the film has no script to speak of, and the characters are hard to sympathize with. It lacks in terms of interesting plot and consistent characterization." The Hindu in its review said "For a film that showed promise, at least in its promos, Anjaana Anjaani is unfortunately not about that beautiful romance between strangers."

== Accolades ==
| Award | Category | Recipient(s) and nominee(s) | Result | Ref. |
|---|---|---|---|---|
| Filmfare Awards | Best Music Director | Vishal–Shekhar | Nominated | |
| Zee Cine Awards | Best Music Director | Vishal–Shekhar | Nominated | |
| Screen Awards | Best Actress (Popular Choice) | Priyanka Chopra | Nominated | |
| Lions Gold Awards | Favourite Popular Film Actor – Female | Priyanka Chopra | Won | |
| Producers Guild Film Awards | Best Choreography | Ahmed Khan (for "Anjaana Anjaani Ki Kahaani") | Nominated | |
| 3rd Mirchi Music Awards | Song representing Sufi tradition | "Aas Pass Khuda" | Nominated | |
