= Home Delivery =

2005 Indian film by Sujoy Ghosh

- Theatrical release poster
- Directed by: Sujoy Ghosh
- Screenplay by: Sujoy Ghosh
- Dialogues by: Sujoy Ghosh; Ritesh Shah; Milap Zaveri
- Story by: Sujoy Ghosh; Suresh Nair
- Produced by: Shabbir Boxwala
- Starring: Vivek Oberoi; Ayesha Takia; Boman Irani; Mahima Chaudhry
- Cinematography: Sirsha Ray
- Edited by: Suresh Pai
- Music by: Vishal–Shekhar
- Production company: Percept Picture Company
- Distributed by: Zee Motion Pictures (India); Eros International (Overseas)
- Release date: 2 December 2005
- Running time: 151 minutes
- Country: India
- Language: Hindi

Home Delivery: Aapko... Ghar Tak (transl. Home Delivery: At your house) is a 2005 Indian Hindi-language romantic comedy film written and directed by Sujoy Ghosh and produced by Shabbir Boxwala. The film stars Vivek Oberoi, Ayesha Takia, Mahima Chaudhry, and Boman Irani in the lead roles. The film received negative reviews, with criticism aimed at the unoriginal plot, humor, direction, and acting, although the visual effects, soundtrack, and performances of Oberoi and Irani were praised.

A mobile video game based on the film was released in 2006.

== Plot ==
Home Delivery is the story of how it takes just a single day to change a person's outlook on life forever. Sunny Chopra (Vivek Oberoi) is a 28-year-old writer who has carved a name for himself as a popular agony uncle, named Gyan Guru, writing for the Times of Hindustan. Sunny also managed to bag a prestigious screenplay writing project for the most happening film director, Karan Johar. A bit of a cynic, he believes he is a self-made man and that whatever he has achieved in life is due to his own hard work and nobody else's. His cynicism is extended to his views about marriage to his fiancée Jenny (Ayesha Takia) and to the festival of Diwali too.

Just as Sunny is cynical about life, Michael Burnett (Boman Irani) is optimistic about it. 51-year-old Michael is a simple-minded man, almost childlike and has recently landed a job as a pizza delivery boy at Mummy's Pizza. Michael has sort of an inclination to lose every job he has ever had in two days flat. This time, however, he vows to keep this one no matter what.

On the eve of Diwali, Sunny has much to do, and very little time to do it. He has to meet his screenplay deadline, he has to get rid of Pandey (Saurabh Shukla), his next door neighbor, and he's got to avoid his editor's telephone calls. But more importantly he needs to get Jenny out of the way because he has a date with Maya (Mahima Chaudhry), a South Indian superstar. Sunny forgets that there is no food in his bachelor pad and orders a pizza that Michael is given the task of delivering.

== Cast ==
- Vivek Oberoi as Sunny Chopra
- Ayesha Takia as Jenny
- Boman Irani as Michael Burnett
- Mahima Chaudhry as Maya
- Saurabh Shukla as Pandey
- Aman Verma as Hitesh Sharma
- Tiku Talsania as Gungunani
- Arif Zakaria as Page 3 Psycho (P3P)
- Sanjay Suri as Marriage man
- Shayan Munshi as Corporate man
- Shernaz Patel as Lillian
- Ashiesh Roy as Mr. Boltu
- Victor Banerjee

=== Cameo appearances ===
- Abhishek Bachchan as Himself / the customer
- Suniel Shetty as the guy with shades and time man
- Riteish Deshmukh as the party man
- Ayan Mukerji as Karan's colleague
- Juhi Chawla as Parvati Kakkar
- Naseeruddin Shah as Uncle

== Soundtrack ==
The soundtrack of the film was composed by Vishal–Shekhar, with lyrics written by Vishal Dadlani.Mere Tumhare Sabke Liye Happy Diwali become the cult song for a Diwali festival

Title	Singer(s)
"Mere Tumhare Sabke Liye Happy Diwali"	Vaishali Unnikrishnan, Suraj Jagan, Sruthi Unnikrishnan, Sunidhi Chauhan
"Happy Diwali (Remix)"	Sunidhi Chauhan, Divya, Sruthi Unnikrishnan, Vaishali Unnikrishnan, Suraj Jagan
"Chaand Ki Roshani Se"	K. K.
"Cucu - Mann Dole Tann Dole"	Sunidhi Chauhan, Shekhar Ravjiani
"Gyan Guru"	Vishal Dadlani
"Har Kisika Koyee Hota Sahara (Kaash)"	Shaan
"Home Delivery (Title Song)"	Boman Irani
"Jhume Re Aandhee, Jhume Yeh Tufan (Maya)"	Sanjay Dutt, Vishal Dadlani
"Khushbu Churati Hawa Chalengi"	Sunidhi Chauhan
