= Zee Cine Critics Award for Best Actor – Female =

Film award in India

Zee Cine Critics Award for Best Actress
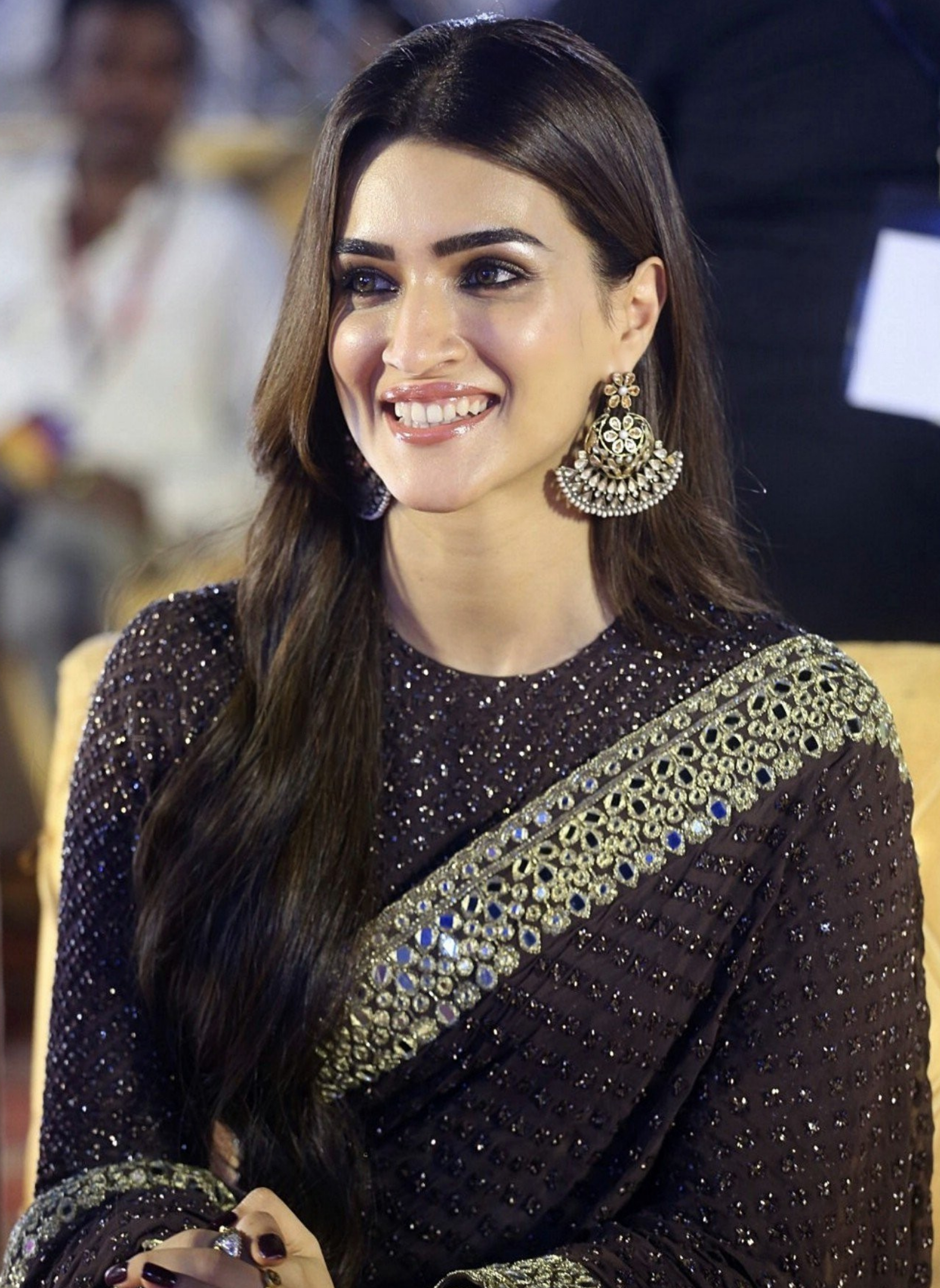
- The 2026 recipient: Kriti Sanon
- Awarded for: Best Performance by an Actress in a Leading Role (Critics)
- Country: India
- Presented by: Zee Entertainment Enterprises
- First award: Aishwarya Rai, Raincoat (2005)
- Currently held by: Kriti Sanon, Tere Ishq Mein (2026)
- Website: zeecineawards.com

The Zee Cine Critics Award - Best Actress is chosen by a jury organized by Zee Entertainment Enterprises. It is a category of Zee Cine Award for the Hindi film industry. They were instituted in November 1997 to award "Excellence in cinema - the democratic way".

They were first held in Mumbai until 2004, when the ZCA went international and had their ceremony in Dubai, and in following years in London, Mauritius, Malaysia, and London again in 2008. It was not held in 2009 and 2010, but resumed in 2011, being held in Singapore in 2012 it was held at the CotaiArena in Macao. The 2018 edition was held at MMRDA Grounds, Mumbai.

== Multiple wins ==
Wins	Recipient
2	Aishwarya Rai, Vidya Balan, Deepika Padukone, Alia Bhatt, Kriti Sanon

== Winners ==
=== Critics Award for Best Actor – Female ===
Year	Winner	Film	Character
2005	Aishwarya Rai	Raincoat	
2006	Shweta Prasad	Iqbal	
2007	Ayesha Takia	Dor	
2007	Gul Panag	Dor	
2008	Shefali Shah	Gandhi, My Father	
2009	Not held		
2010	Not held		
2011	Aishwarya Rai	Guzaarish	
2012	Vidya Balan	The Dirty Picture	
2013	Vidya Balan	Kahaani	
2014	Sonakshi Sinha	Lootera	
2015	Katrina Kaif	Bang Bang!	
2016	Deepika Padukone	Piku	
2017	Alia Bhatt	Udta Punjab	
2018	Sridevi	Mom	
2019	Deepika Padukone	Padmaavat	
2020	Taapsee Pannu	Badla	
2021	Not held		
2022	Not held		
2023	Alia Bhatt	Gangubai Kathiawadi	
2024	Rani Mukerji	Mrs Chatterjee vs Norway	
2025	Kriti Sanon	Teri Baaton Mein Aisa Uljha Jiya	
2026	Kriti Sanon	Tere Ishk Mein	

=== Outstanding Performance – Female ===
Year	Winner	Film	Character
2002	Kajol	Kabhi Khushi Kabhie Gham	Anjali Sharma Raichand

Note: The Outstanding Performance Award was discontinued after 2002 and was later revived in 2005 as the Jury’s Choice Award for Best Actor.

== See also ==
- Bollywood
- Cinema of India
