= Sujoy Ghosh =

Indian filmmaker (born 1966)

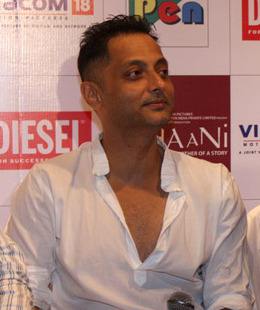
- Ghosh in 2012
- Born: 21 May 1966 (age 60); Kolkata, West Bengal, India
- Occupations: Film director; screenwriter; producer; actor
- Years active: 2003–present

Sujoy Ghosh (born 21 May 1966) is an Indian filmmaker and actor who works in Hindi and Bengali films.

== Early life ==
Sujoy Ghosh was born in Kolkata, West Bengal, India. He studied at St. James' School, Kolkata. before moving to London at the age of 13, where he attended Queen Elizabeth Sixth Form College. He holds a Bachelor of Engineering and Master of Business Administration from The University of Manchester. Before working in films, he worked as the Head of the Media division of Reuters before resigning in 1999.

== Career ==
Ghosh made his directorial debut with Jhankaar Beats (2003), which paid tribute to musician R. D. Burman. The film emerged as a sleeper hit. His next ventures Home Delivery (2005) and Aladin (2009) both underperformed at the box-office. His next directorial, Kahaani (2012) starring Vidya Balan in the lead role, gained widespread critical acclaim and commercial success. Its sequel Kahaani 2: Durga Rani Singh (2016) was released as a standalone sequel. Besides his directorial ventures, he made his acting debut portraying the role of Bengali detective Byomkesh Bakshi in a film directed by Rituparno Ghosh in 2012.

== Filmography ==
=== Feature films ===
Year	Title	Director	Writer	Producer	Notes
2003	Jhankaar Beats	Yes	Yes	No	
2005	Home Delivery: Aapko... Ghar Tak	Yes	Yes	No	
2009	Aladin	Yes	Yes	Yes	
2012	Kahaani	Yes	Yes	Yes	
2014	Bang Bang!	No	Yes	No	
2016	Kahaani 2: Durga Rani Singh	Yes	Yes	Yes	
2016	Te3n	No	No	Yes	
2019	Badla	Yes	Yes	Yes	
2021	Bob Biswas	No	Yes	Yes	Released on ZEE5
2023	Jaane Jaan	Yes	Yes	Yes	Released on Netflix
2023	Blind	No	Yes	Yes	Released on JioCinema
2023	Lust Stories 2	Yes	Yes	No	Segment: Sex With Ex
2026	King †	No	Yes	No	

=== Short films ===
Year	Title	Director	Writer	Producer	Notes
2015	Ahalya	Yes	Yes	Yes	
2017	Anukul	Yes	Yes	Yes	
2018	Good Luck	Yes	Yes	Yes	
2018	Copy	No	Yes	Yes	
2018	Mirchi Malini	No	No	Yes	

=== Television ===
Year	Title	Creator	Director	Writer	Producer
2019	Typewriter	Yes	Yes	Yes	Yes

=== Acting credits ===
Year	Title	Role
2001	Everybody Says I'm Fine!	Premal
2005	My Brother...Nikhil	
2005	Bluffmaster!	Director in climax
2007	Ta Ra Rum Pum	
2012	100% Love	Abhi
2012	3 Kanya	Roy
2013	Satyanweshi	Byomkesh
2013	Majnu	Arun
2016	Badman	

== Awards and nominations ==
Year	Awards	Category	Film
2012	BIG Star Entertainment Awards	Most Entertaining Thriller Film	Kahaani
2013	60th National Film Awards	Best Screenplay (Original)	Kahaani
2013	58th Filmfare Awards	Best Director	Kahaani
2013	Colors Screen Awards	Best Story	Kahaani
2013	Star Guild Awards	Best Director	Kahaani
2013	Star Guild Awards	Best Screenplay	Kahaani
2013	Times of India Film Awards	Best Story	Kahaani
2013	Times of India Film Awards	Best Screenplay	Kahaani
2013	Stardust Awards	Hottest Film Producer of the Year	Kahaani
2013	Zee Cine Awards	Best Film – Critics	Kahaani
2013	Zee Cine Awards	Best Director – Critics	Kahaani
2013	Zee Cine Awards	Best Story	Kahaani
2013	ETC Bollywood Business Awards	Most Surprise Hit of the Year	Kahaani
