= Kahaani =

2012 Indian film by Sujoy Ghosh

- Theatrical release poster
- Directed by: Sujoy Ghosh
- Screenplay by: Sujoy Ghosh
- Story by: Sujoy Ghosh; Advaita Kala
- Produced by: Sujoy Ghosh; Kushal Kantilal Gada
- Starring: Vidya Balan; Parambrata Chatterjee; Nawazuddin Siddiqui; Indraneil Sengupta; Saswata Chatterjee
- Cinematography: Satyajit Pande (Setu)
- Edited by: Namrata Rao
- Music by: Songs: Vishal–Shekhar; Score: Clinton Cerejo
- Production companies: Pen India Private Limited; Boundscript Motion Pictures
- Distributed by: Viacom18 Motion Pictures; Wave Cinemas Ponty Chadha
- Release date: 9 March 2012
- Running time: 122 minutes
- Country: India
- Language: Hindi
- Budget: ₹80 million
- Box office: ₹1.04 billion

Kahaani (IPA: [kəˈɦaːni]; transl. 'Story') is a 2012 Indian Hindi-language thriller film co-written, co-produced, and directed by Sujoy Ghosh. It stars Vidya Balan as Vidya Bagchi, a pregnant woman looking for her missing husband in Kolkata during the festival of Durga Puja, assisted by Assist Sub-Inspector Satyoki "Rana" Sinha (Parambrata Chatterjee) and Inspector General A. Khan (Nawazuddin Siddiqui).

Made on a budget of ₹80 million (US$830,000), Kahaani was conceived and developed by Ghosh, who co-wrote the film with Advaita Kala. The crew often employed guerrilla-filmmaking techniques on Kolkata's streets to avoid attracting attention. Its creative portrayal of the city and its use of local crew and cast made it a notable film. Kahaani explores themes of feminism and motherhood in a male-dominated Indian society. The film also makes several allusions to Satyajit Ray's films, such as Charulata (1964), Aranyer Din Ratri (1970), and Joi Baba Felunath (1979). The film's musical score and soundtrack were composed by Clinton Cerejo and Vishal–Shekhar respectively, with cinematography handled by Setu and editing done by Namrata Rao.

Kahaani was released worldwide on 9 March 2012. Critics praised the screenplay, the cinematography and the performances of the lead actors. Following critical acclaim and word-of-mouth publicity, the film earned ₹1.04 billion (US$11 million) worldwide in 50 days. The film won several awards, including three National Film Awards and five Filmfare Awards. The latter included trophies for Best Director (Ghosh) and Best Actress (Vidya). The film was remade by Sekhar Kammula in Telugu as Anaamika (2014) with Nayanthara reprising Vidya's role. A spiritual successor, titled Kahaani 2: Durga Rani Singh, was released on 2 December 2016.

== Plot ==
During the Durga Puja festivities in Kolkata, a rogue agent orchestrates a catastrophic poison gas attack on a metro train compartment, killing all passengers on board. Two years later, Vidya Bagchi, a pregnant British-Indian software engineer, arrives in the city from London in search of her missing husband, Arnab Bagchi. She claims he vanished after traveling to Kolkata on a temporary assignment for the National Data Center (NDC). A sympathetic young police officer, Satyoki "Rana" Sinha, offers to assist her. However, their initial checks at the NDC reveal no administrative record of anyone named Arnab Bagchi ever being employed there.

Agnes D'Mello, the head of human resources at the NDC, notes that Arnab strongly resembles a former employee named Milan Damji, whose archived records are stored at the agency's defunct old headquarters. Before Agnes can retrieve the file for Vidya, she is murdered at her doorstep by Bob Biswas, a ruthless assassin operating under the guise of a life insurance agent. Undeterred, Vidya and Rana break into the abandoned facility and secure Damji's official folder, narrowly evading Bob, who had been dispatched to destroy the evidence. This breach alerts the Intelligence Bureau (IB) in New Delhi, prompting rogue deputy chief Khan and IB Chief Bhaskaran K. to intervene. Khan flies to Kolkata and reveals to Vidya that Damji was an elite IB operative who went rogue and masterminded the metro gas tragedy. Though Khan demands she drop the investigation, Vidya refuses, fearing Arnab's physical resemblance to the terrorist has placed him in lethal danger.

The address listed in Damji’s document leads Vidya and Rana to a dilapidated apartment, where a local tea stall boy associates the property with R. Sridhar, a high-ranking current officer at the NDC. Bob attempts another assassination on Vidya but fails, dying under the wheels of a truck during the ensuing foot chase. Data extracted from Bob's mobile phone traces encrypted kill orders back to Sridhar's office IP address. Vidya and Rana infiltrate Sridhar's office to download his computer logs, triggering an electronic silent alarm. Sridhar returns and corners them, but Vidya accidentally shoots and kills him during a desperate physical struggle, frustrating Khan, who needed the officer alive for interrogation.

Deciphering Sridhar's encrypted hard drive reveals that his handler was IB Chief Bhaskaran. Vidya telephones Bhaskaran directly, lying that she holds compromising state documents stolen from Sridhar's desk, and offers an exchange for her husband. Bhaskaran dismisses her, but Vidya immediately receives a second anonymous call threatening Arnab's life unless she delivers the files to a secluded location. Khan assumes the mysterious caller is Damji himself.

Accompanied by a covert sniper detail led by Khan and Rana, Vidya arrives at the designated rendezvous point to meet Milan Damji. When Vidya openly questions whether Damji actually has her husband alive, the terrorist grows suspicious and prepares to flee. Vidya tries to block his exit, prompting Damji to draw his pistol. In a stunning twist, Vidya disarms him by ripping off her prosthetic belly—revealing her entire pregnancy was a carefully orchestrated facade—stabs him in the jugular with a sharp metal hair stick, and executes him with his own weapon. She vanishes into the dense festival crowds before the tactical team can secure the room, leaving behind a thank-you note for Rana and a drive containing Sridhar’s decrypted logs, which definitively implicates and ruins Bhaskaran.

Rana's subsequent investigation uncovers that "Vidya Bagchi" and "Arnab Bagchi" were entirely fabricated identities used to manipulate the local police force and the IB into flushing out the terrorist. The woman is actually the widow of Major Arup Basu, an army officer killed in the metro gas attack. Upon identifying her husband's body two years prior, she had collapsed from shock, causing a genuine miscarriage. Seeking absolute vengeance for her husband and unborn child, she had partnered with a retired, suspicious IB officer, Colonel Pratap Bajpayee, to execute the elaborate retaliatory sting operation.

== Cast ==
Credits adapted from Bollywood Hungama.

- Vidya Balan as Vidya Bagchi / Vidya Basu
- Parambrata Chatterjee as ASI Satyaki "Rana" Sinha
- Nawazuddin Siddiqui as Deputy Inspector General A. Khan, Intelligence Bureau, New Delhi
- Indraneil Sengupta as Arnab Bagchi / Milan Damji, the main antagonist
- Dhritiman Chatterjee as Director of the Intelligence Bureau, K. Bhaskaran, the mastermind behind the poison-gas attack
- Saswata Chatterjee as Bob Biswas, a contract killer
- Darshan Jariwala as retired Colonel Pratap Bajpayee
- Abir Chatterjee as Major Arup Basu, Vidya's husband, who died in the poison-gas attack
- Shantilal Mukherjee as R. Shridhar, chief technical officer at the NDC
- Kharaj Mukherjee as SI Chatterjee, a friendly inspector at the Kalighat Police Station.
- Colleen Blanche as Agnes D'Mello
- Nitya Ganguli as Mr. Das, Monalisa guest house owner.
- Rwitobroto Mukherjee as Bishnu, a worker at the guest house.
- Pamela Bhuttoria as Sapna, an employee at NDC.
- Kalyan Chatterjee as Paresh Pal, a clay artist and a police informer.
- Masood Akhtar as Rasik Tyagi, systems supervisor at the NDC
- Arindam Sil as news watcher
- Riddhi Sen as tea seller Poltu

== Production ==
=== Development ===
Sujoy Ghosh approached novelist and script writer Advaita Kala with the idea for the film. Kala took inspiration from her experience in Kolkata, where she had moved in 1999, akin to the protagonist in the film. She reported that despite facing a language barrier and the chaos and poverty of the metropolis, she was charmed by the warmth of the people, which was reflected in the film. Kala started writing in 2009 and finished the 185-page script by February 2010. Her research included reading the books Open Secrets: India's Intelligence Unveiled by Maloy Krishna Dhar and India's External Intelligence: Secrets of Research and Analysis Wing (RAW) by V. K. Singh.

Ghosh, who co-wrote the story and the screenplay, began to plan the film while awaiting the release of his previous film Aladin (2009), but the dismal response to Aladin was a setback. He had to approach several producers to finance him for Kahaani, but was refused and discouraged from making the film owing to three factors: a pregnant woman as the lead star, a bunch of unknown Bengali actors as the supporting cast and Kolkata as a backdrop. Yashraj Films were willing to produce the film, but wanted Ghosh to sign a three-film deal, which he declined because he did not want that much commitment.

Bengali film actor Prosenjit Chatterjee encouraged Ghosh to shoot in Kolkata. Ghosh finally selected Kolkata for several reasons: the director's acquaintance with the city, its mix of modernity and old-world charm, and budget constraints. Kolkata is a cheaper location than Mumbai or Delhi, where most Bollywood films are shot.

Ghosh admitted in an interview that after his two preceding directorial ventures—Aladin and Home Delivery (2005)—performed poorly at the box office, Kahaani was his last chance to create a niche as a director. He added that the film's plot twist came somewhat accidentally. Having described the skeleton of the story to a friend during its development, the friend called him back a few days later to enquire about his film. The friend had mistakenly imagined sequences which he assumed to be parts of the plot, from which the twist ending was derived.

=== Casting ===
According to Jyothika, she was initially offered the role of Vidya Bagchi, but declined; the role eventually went to Vidya Balan. Unimpressed with the plot outline, Vidya refused, only changing her mind after having read the completed script.

Ghosh chose mostly Bengali actors as he wanted to make the characters as authentic as possible. The role of the Inspector Satyoki "Rana" Sinha was first offered to Chandan Roy Sanyal, but he could not take the part due to other commitments. Parambrata Chatterjee, a Bengali actor whose acting in the film The Bong Connection (2006) had impressed Ghosh at the Mumbai Academy of the Moving Image festival, was later offered the role in Kahaani. Chatterjee had earlier worked with Vidya in her début film Bhalo Theko (2003).

The casting director Roshmi Banerjee suggested Nawazuddin Siddiqui for the role of Khan. Siddiqui, who had only had minor roles in Bollywood up to that time, was surprised that for the first time he would not have to portray a beggar. Saswata Chatterjee, another Bengali actor, was surprised as well when he was offered the role of the contract killer Bob Biswas. He thought there were suitable actors in Hindi film industry for the role. He said that Ghosh had known him since childhood and was impressed with his acting, so he wanted him as Bob Biswas.

Ghosh went against the expectations of casting a popular actor from Bollywood. He signed Bengali actor Abir Chatterjee to play Vidya's husband. According to Ghosh, popular Bollywood actors were not willing to work with him after his two previous flops. He also believed that audience might expect more screen-time from a better-known actor. Several other Bengali film and television actors, such as Indraneil Sengupta and Kharaj Mukherjee, were cast in supporting roles.

=== Characters ===
Before the shooting of the film began, Vidya started to use a prosthetic belly to look as close to authentically pregnant as possible. According to news reports, she met doctors and pregnant women to learn about the typical lifestyle and nuances of a pregnant woman, and also made lists of rules and superstitions followed by pregnant women. Vidya said that during her college days she often used to imitate pregnant ladies during stand-up acting among friends, an experience that helped her during the shooting.

While briefing Saswata Chatterjee about his character, the cold-blooded killer Bob Biswas, Ghosh used the phrase "Binito Bob" (meaning polite Bob), which crystallised the notion of Bob's manners. Further discussions led to the inclusion of paunch and a bald patch. Chatterjee devised the mannerism of rubbing his nails together as some Indians believe doing that helps prevent hair loss. The mannerism was well-noted and praised by the viewers. Ghosh was surprised at how Bob Biswas was greeted by fans as a cult figure. He emphasised that the deliberate ordinariness of Bob Biswas was portrayed so convincingly by Chatterjee that the viewers can expect Bob to be around them at any time and any place.

Parambrata Chatterjee said in an interview that he did not identify with the Rana character, owing to the difference between his own urban upbringing and Rana's rural background. Chatterjee visited police stations and did some research "on their work, mindset and other relevant things" to prepare for the role. The character Khan was envisaged as a ruthless, arrogant, expletive-spewing officer who cares nothing about the emotional or social consequences of his behaviour. Siddiqui said that he was surprised on being offered the role, and wondered how he could portray the arrogance needed for the character. Ghosh built Khan as a character with lean physical build but full of mental strength, loyalty and patriotism. Khan smokes a relatively cheap brand of cigarette (Gold Flake) despite his high official post; Siddiqui had smoked that brand of cigarette throughout his struggling days in Bollywood and thereafter.

=== Filming ===
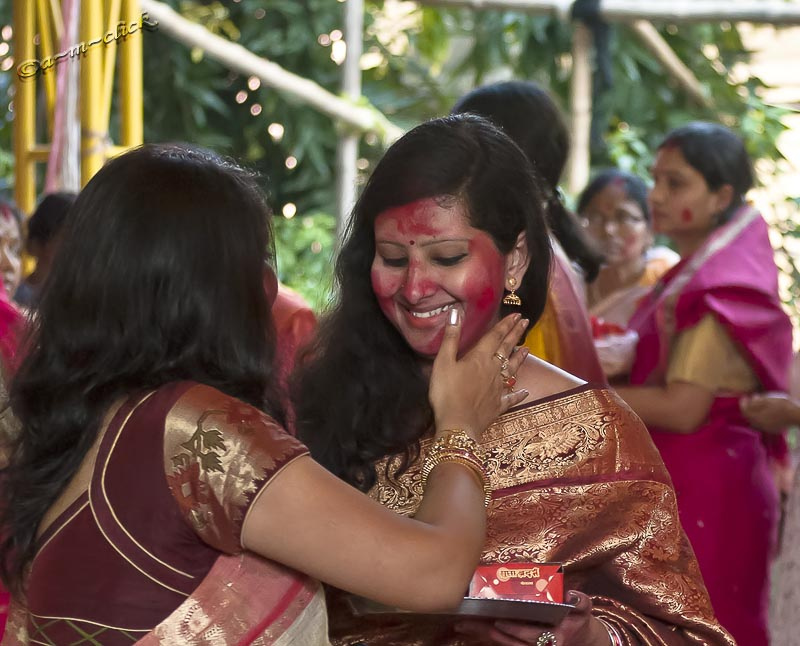
The climax showed Sindoor khela, a ritual on the last day of Durga Puja in which married women smear each other's face with sindoor (vermilion).

Filming took place on the streets of Kolkata, where Ghosh often employed the art of guerrilla filmmaking (shooting in real locations without any previous knowledge given to onlookers) to avoid unwanted attention. The cinematographer Setu, who had assisted others in the past to shoot documentaries in Kolkata, said that unlike majority of Indian films, Kahaani was shot mostly without artificial light. The film was shot in 64 days, during which the Durga Puja festival of 2010 took place. Shooting locations in Kolkata included Kalighat Metro station, Nonapukur tram depot, (Note: A Calcutta Tramways Company workshop on Bijli Road in Kolkata.) Kumartuli, Howrah Bridge, Victoria Memorial, old houses of North Kolkata and others. The climax, which takes place on the night of Vijayadashami (the last day of Durga Puja), was shot on the night of Vijayadashami in the premises of a Barowari (publicly organised) Durga Puja celebration in the Ballygunge neighbourhood of Kolkata. Most of the crowd in the climax were not actors. Some actors mingled with the crowd engaged in Sindoor khela (Note: Sindoor khela is a ritual on Vijayadashami in which married women anoint each others' faces with sindoor (vermilion).)—their job was to appreciate the camera angles and accordingly apply sindoor (vermilion) on Vidya's face so that accidental exposure of her eyes to sindoor could be avoided.

Ghosh chose the guest house in which the protagonist stays after noticing it during his visit to a neighbouring hotel in April 2010. He booked it for 10 days for ₹40,000 (US$420), and requested the guest-house employees to keep the shooting schedule a secret. Choosing a room with windows overlooking a busy road, he proceeded to give it an old-fashioned look by replacing the windows' designer grilles with old-fashioned wooden ones, and by painting the room with some rough patches.

== Themes and influences ==
After Ishqiya (2010), No One Killed Jessica (2011) and The Dirty Picture (2011), Kahaani was Vidya's fourth woman-centric film to win widespread praise for her unconventional approach to portraying strong female roles. According to Zee News, Kahaani is a woman's film about "role reversals, breaking of stereotypes, turning clichés inside out, a woman's journey, and the way she carves a niche for herself in the male-dominated mentalscape of the society." Trisha Gupta of The Indian Express also finds feminist themes in the film. For Ghosh, one aspect of his project "is a study of motherhood"; the instinct of a mother to protect her baby inspired him to develop the story.

A recurring theme is the fleeting hint of romance between Rana and Vidya. Ghosh said that this delicate romance was "the most progressive thing" in the film—a suggestion that a man could fall in love with a pregnant woman. The director explained that the boy was initially "fascinated by someone who is literally a hero in his eyes", as Rana was awed by the computer skills of Vidya. Gradually, the fascinated boy moves into a zone where he tries to protect her.

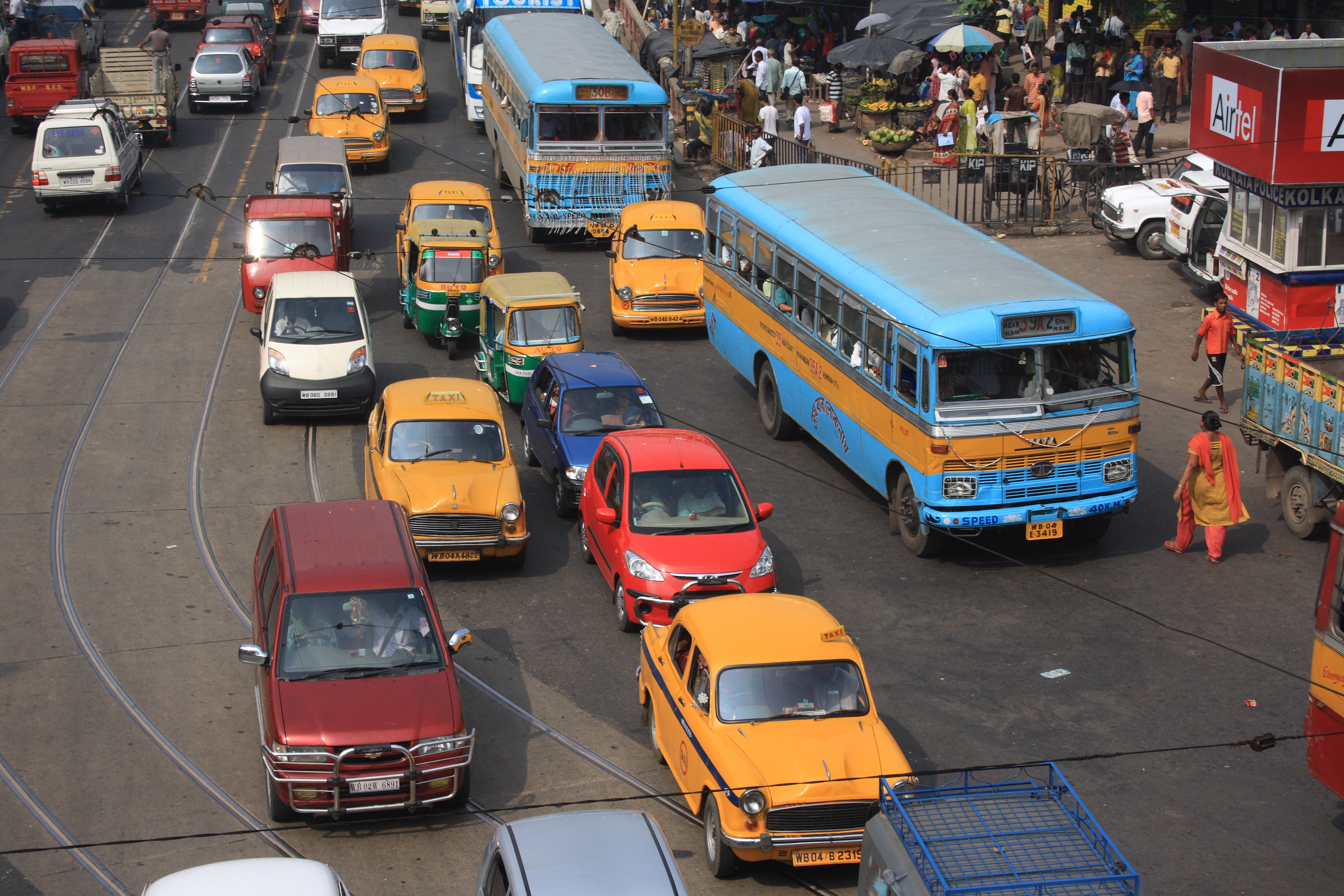
A road in Kolkata showing congested traffic and yellow taxis. The skillful portrayal of the city in the film was noted by reviewers.

Some reviewers note that a major protagonist is Kolkata itself, which is "brimming with warm, sympathetic inhabitants". A review in Rediff.com notes that the director pays a "fond yet understated tribute" to the city by incorporating imagery such as "yellow taxis, leisurely trams, congested traffic, claustrophobic metros, dilapidated brick houses, tapering alleys, rajnigandhas, (Note: Rajanigandha (tuberose) flowers are used in religious and social events in India.) lal paad saris, (Note: Lal paad sari, meaning sari with red border, usually white sari with red border, is traditionally considered auspicious and worn in many religious or social occasions in Bengali culture.) piping hot luchis". (Note: Luchi is a deep-fried flatbread made of wheat flour, typical of Bengali and some other cuisines. It is often eaten with a potato curry or a dal made of yellow split-peas.) According to the reviewer, Kahaani did not depend on the tropes of Kolkata culture typically used in Bollywood film—"O-emphasizing accent, dramatic play of conch shells, rasgulla/mishti doi excesses." The director acknowledges that Kolkata "becomes a central character" of the film. Gautaman Bhaskaran, writing for Gulf Times, notes that Kolkata imagery was polished up in the film; noted Bengali director Srijit Mukherji argues that the portrayal of the city in Kahaani was akin to a "Lonely Planet exotica" on the city. Uddalak Mukherjee of The Telegraph explains that Kolkata in Kahaani was cosmetic and lacked a deep menacing presence. Mukherjee argues the depiction of the city never matches the level of Satyajit Ray's Calcutta trilogy, where "aided by bloodshed, greed and decadence, ...Calcutta ..., even though a place of dreams, desires and hope, slides irreversibly into chaos, anxiety and a moral crisis, taking its residents with it".

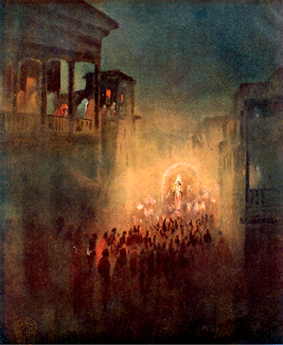
The colour scheme of Kahaani was inspired by the painting Pratima Visarjan by Gaganendranath Tagore.

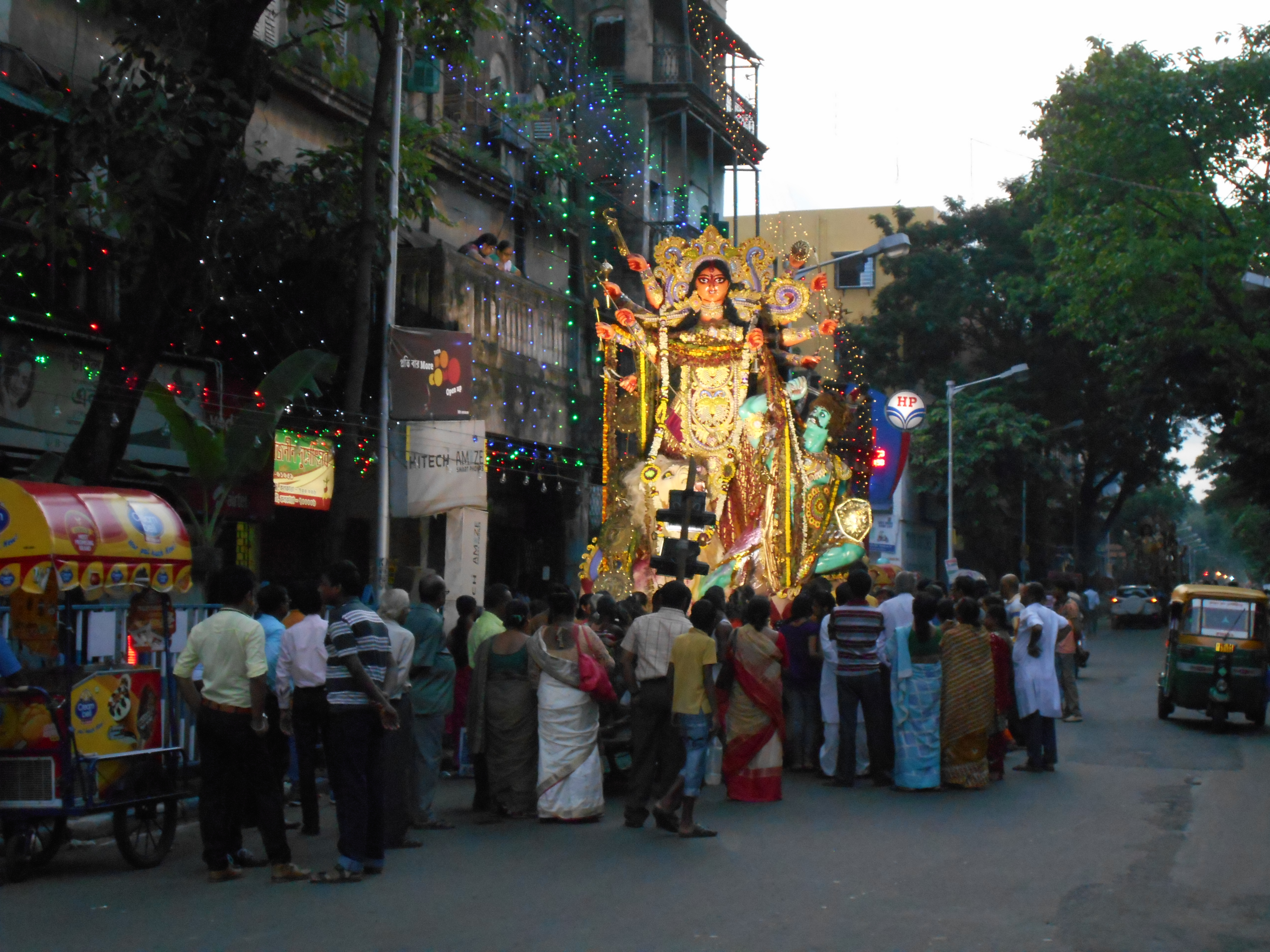
Contemporary Durga Idol procession in Kolkata, 2016

Durga Puja, the autumnal festival to worship goddess Durga, plays a prominent role in the story. The allegorical yearly return of goddess Durga to slay the demon Mahishasura is alluded to at the end of the film. According to Uddalak Mukherjee of The Telegraph, "Durga Puja, with its paraphernalia of idols, immersion processions, pandals, even an entire crowd of women draped in white saris with red borders, is central to the film's ... visual aesthetic." A review in Rediff.com praised the depiction of the festivities in Kolkata, a city well known for its celebration of Durga Puja.

Ghosh acknowledges the allusions to Ray's films. In one scene, Vidya asks the manager of the guest house why there is no hot water although the signboard had claimed "running hot water". The manager explains that the sign refers for his errand boy, who runs to deliver hot water in a kettle whenever required. This alludes to a similar scene in Ray's Joi Baba Felunath (1979). In an interview with The Telegraph, Ghosh says that the way Vidya looks out and moves from window to window in the guest-house room is reminiscent of Ray's Charulata (1964), where the actress Madhabi Mukherjee enjoys glimpses of the outside world through the blinds of windows. He also acknowledges the influence of Mahanagar (1963), another Ray film noted for its portrayal of Kolkata. According to the director, he was inspired by particular scenes of Ray's Nayak (1966) to plan the portrayal of complex emotional issues between Vidya and the police officer Rana, especially Rana's awe in the presence of Vidya. Ghosh expresses his inspiration from Ray's Aranyer Dinratri (1970) in which Ray "wanted the audience to be inside the car with the four guys all the time. So the camera never leaves the car." Ghosh shot a similar scene, hoping the audience would become "like Vidya's fellow passenger."

Besides Ray's films, Ghosh also admits inspiration from what he calls "visually striking" films of the 1970s and 1980s, such as Deewaar (1975). Critics have compared the fake-pregnancy twist of Kahaani with the 2004 American psychological thriller Taking Lives. The sequences towards the end that explain the missing pieces of the mystery were compared with The Usual Suspects (1995). Ghosh writes that the film was heavily influenced by the colour scheme of the Pratima Visarjan, a c.1915 watercolour by the Bengal School artist Gaganendranath Tagore.

== Soundtrack ==
The film score is composed by Clinton Cerejo, whereas the soundtrack album is composed by Vishal–Shekhar, and the lyrics for the film's six songs were written by Vishal Dadlani, Anvita Dutt and Sandeep Srivastava. Several of R. D. Burman's Hindi and Bengali compositions were used in the background. The album was released on 13 February 2012, subsequently on the digital music platform Apple iTunes India since its inception from mid-2012. The soundtrack received positive reviews, and was praised for its amalgamation of Bengali and Hindi lyrics.

== Marketing and release ==
Kahaani's first-look poster was launched on 2 December 2011, and the official trailer on 5 January 2012. The poster, portraying a pregnant Vidya Balan and lacking any romantic element, was well received. Critics' expectations were low, owing to the director's previous box-office failures. Vidya appeared in public with a prosthetic belly to promote the film, and mingled with the public in railway stations, bus stands and markets. She often carried a sketch of her on-screen missing husband, and asked people to help in finding him. Social-networking website Ibibo.com developed an online game, The Great Indian Parking Wars, which required players to park Vidya's taxi on a street; it was well-received, reaching 50,000 hits in 10 days.

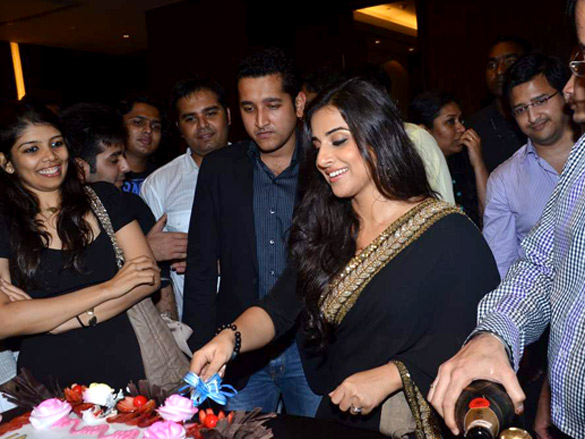
Vidya (centre) and Chatterjee (to her right) celebrate the success of Kahaani.

On 5 March 2012, prior to release, Kolkata Metro authorities objected to a scene in which Vidya is pushed by a man onto the tracks as a train arrives. They requested that the scene be removed, as it would remind people of the past suicides, which had tarnished the railway's image. The filmmakers screened the scene for the authorities and explained that nothing in the film would affect the image of the Metro or prompt people to commit suicide. Convinced, the officials withdrew their objections, and the scene was retained, although it was removed from trailers.

Kahaani was released on 9 March 2012, a day after International Women's Day. It played on 1100 screens worldwide. CNN-IBN reported that although Kahaani was ready before The Dirty Picture, distributors deferred its release, fearing that Vidya's role of a sexy siren (in The Dirty Picture) after that of a pregnant woman might not be received well. STAR TV bought the exclusive right to broadcast the film for a price of ₹80 million (US$830,000), which was the highest-ever price paid for a female-centric film in India. The Indian television premiere of the film was on Star India's channel Movies OK on 3 June 2012. The DVD of the film was released on 17 May 2012 across all regions in a one-disc pack in NTSC format. Distributed by Shemaroo Entertainment, it contained additional content, such as behind-the-scene footage, video of celebration parties after its theatrical release, and music videos of the songs of the film. The VCD and Blu-ray versions were released at the same time. The film is also available on Netflix.

== Reception ==
=== Critical response ===
Kahaani received critical acclaim. According to review aggregator Review Gang the film received a rating of 7.5 out of 10, based on the reviews by professional critics. Good word of mouth publicity played a part in its popularity besides the positive reviews. The Telegraph called the film "a mind-juggling medley of manipulation masquerading as a 'mother of a story'". Taran Adarsh of Bollywood Hungama gave the film 4 out of 5 stars, and praised Vidya's acting. The Times of India commented "Once again, a 'pregnant' Vidya, ironically displays more 'male ornaments' ... than most heroes." The reviews in Rediff, Indo Asian News Service, CNN-IBN, Zee News, Hindustan Times, and The Hindu were unanimously positive, and noted script, direction, cinematography, and acting as strong points of the film. Noted film actress and multiple National Award winner Shabana Azmi lauded Vidya for her performance,"As an actor, I could see she [Vidya] was making all the right moves throughout the film. There was not a single artificial note in her performance." Russell Edwards, the reviewer for Variety, praised the cast, cinematography, and direction, and commented that despite occasional glitches, the "adroit thriller ... maintains momentum and credibility."

Many reviewers criticised the film's climax and certain features, feeling that they deviated from its general style. Rituparna Chatterjee of CNN-IBN noted that the climax of the film was a "huge dampener" and explained, "The diabolic twist at that juncture got underplayed ... What follows is a sobfest ... the apologetic explanation of why she does what she does. Justifying her action comes across more as an effort to appease the Indian morality". The Outlook review noted, "At times, Kahaani is too clever, at others extremely pedestrian like in the depiction of computer hacking and IB operations, not to speak of the ludicrous terrorist angle and the all-too predictable Durga Puja setting for that mythology tie-in." It adds that the "spoon-feeding" of reasons at the end dampens the intrigue factor. The review in Yahoo! India comments that the Durga metaphor at the end was enforced, and that the film over-indulged in Bengali stereotypes. Gautaman Bhaskaran, in his review in Gulf Times, noted that the sometimes-handheld photography was "as irksome as the plot with a sleuth too many and cops galore."

=== Box office ===
Though Kahaani received critical acclaim, it was a slow starter at the box office, opening to a poor response on the first day, but gradually picking afterwards. According to The Telegraph, the film earned almost ₹20 million (US$210,000) from the state of West Bengal within the first three days of its release. At multiplexes in Kolkata, occupancy increased from 47% on Friday 9 March, the day of release, to 77% on 10 March and to around 97% on 11 March. Box Office India, a website on Indian film trade, reported that the film collected nearly ₹240 million (US$2.5 million) in its first week, well beyond its production cost of ₹80 million (US$830,000). It grossed ₹190 million (US$2.0 million) in second week to make a two-week total of around ₹430 million (US$4.5 million) in India; this led Box Office India to declare the film a "Super Hit". The film was successful in the international box office as well, garnering ₹80 million (US$830,000) within 10 days of its release in seven markets—UK, US, UAE, Australia, New Zealand, Malaysia and Pakistan, according to Bollywood Hungama, a film-related website. By the third week, according to CNN-IBN, it had grossed ₹750 million (US$7.8 million), including India and overseas market. Hindustan Times reported that Kahaani made a worldwide gross of ₹1,044 million (US$11 million) within 50 days of its release.

== Accolades ==
Kahaani was nominated for, and won, many awards. The 58th Filmfare Awards nominated the film for six of their categories, where it won five, including Best Actress for Vidya and Best Director for Ghosh. Kahaani received thirteen nominations at the 19th Colors Screen Awards, and won five, including Best Actress and Best Story. At the 14th Zee Cine Awards, Kahaani won five awards, including Best Film (Critics) and Best Actress (Critics), out of fifteen nominations. At the 2013 Stardust Awards ceremony, Kahaani was announced Hottest Film of the Year while Vidya received for the Best Actress in a Thriller or Action. Kahaani was awarded the Most Entertaining Film of the Year at the 3rd ceremony of the BIG Star Entertainment Awards. At the 60th National Film Awards, Ghosh won Best Screenplay (Original), Namrata Rao won Best Editing, and Nawazuddin Siddiqui won a Special Jury award.

== Remakes ==
Two remakes of Kahaani were released in 2014: a Telugu remake titled Anaamika, and its Tamil version Nee Enge En Anbe, both directed by Sekhar Kammula and featuring Nayantara as the lead character. An English-language remake, entitled Deity and intended to be directed by Niels Arden Oplev, was scheduled to begin in 2015.

== Influence ==
Following Kahaani's success, Kolkata became a preferred destination for Bollywood filmmakers. They felt the landscapes of Mumbai and Delhi were overused for several decades, while Kolkata retained its unique visuals such as metro trains, rickety trams, hand-pulled rickshaws, dingy bylanes, palatial mansions, dilapidated houses of North Kolkata, roadside eateries, ghats of river Ganga, British-era buildings, restaurants and iconic structures and areas including Howrah Bridge, Kalighat Temple, Nakhoda Mosque, Kumortuli idol-making district and Victoria Memorial.

Monalisa Guest House, the lodge which hosted Vidya Bagchi in the film, became a local attraction. Several hundreds have visited it since the film's release, to the extent that the owners planned to increase tariffs and renovate the rooms around a Kahaani theme.

The potbellied contract killer Bob Biswas became an Internet phenomenon, the subject of several jokes and pieces of pop art, which circulated through Facebook and Twitter. "Nomoshkar, Aami Bob Biswas... Ek minute?" ("Hello, I am Bob Biswas... do you have a minute?")—the monologue he repeatedly uses just before murdering his victims—was used in different memes. A graphic novel and a television show based on Bob Biswas were planned in March 2012.

== Future ==
=== Kahaani 2: Durga Rani Singh ===
In March 2012, Sujoy Ghosh announced that he intended to develop Kahaani into a series. He was inspired by Satyajit Ray's Feluda detective series and wanted to continue the stories of Vidya Bagchi on similar lines, with Vidya Balan reprising the role. The shooting of Kahaani 2 was scheduled to begin in 2013, but in July 2013 differences arose between Sujoy Ghosh and other co-producers. In February 2014, Vidya announced that the sequel was not happening due to these differences, but two years later, Ghosh confirmed that the film was in pre-production with Vidya set to reprise her role. The sequel, entitled Kahaani 2, began filming in March 2016 with Vidya and Arjun Rampal in lead roles, and was released on 2 December 2016. The producers indicated plans to release a second sequel.

=== Bob Biswas ===
Bob Biswas is a spin-off to Kahaani produced by Red Chillies Entertainment. The film, starring Abhishek Bachchan as Bob Biswas and Chitrangada Singh as his wife, premiered on 3 December 2021 on ZEE5. This film is the directorial debut of Diya Annapurna Ghosh, daughter of Sujoy Ghosh.
