= Vidya Balan filmography =

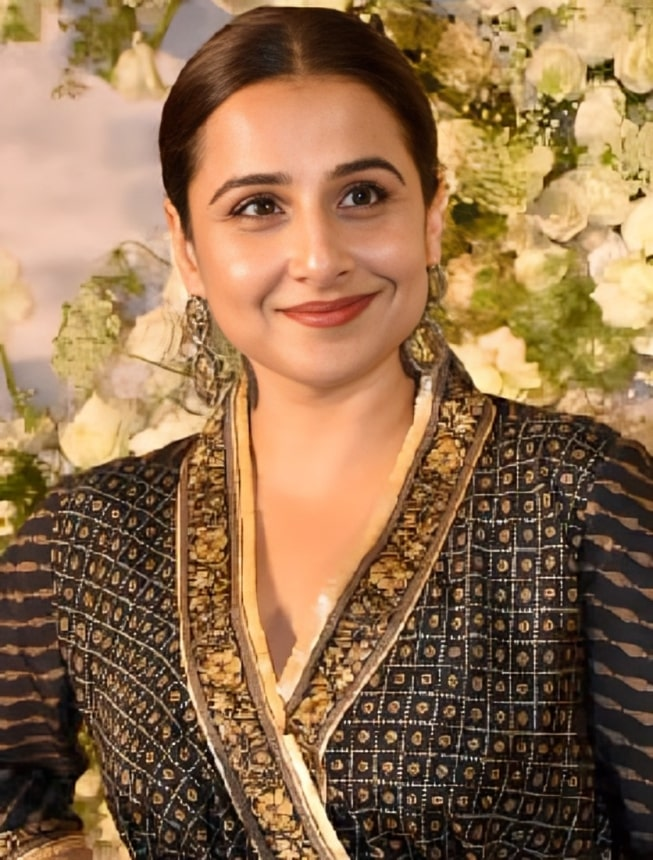
Vidya in 2023

Indian actress Vidya Balan has worked predominantly in Hindi films alongside some Tamil, Malayalam, Telugu, and Marathi films. She made her acting debut in 1995 with the sitcom Hum Paanch, following which she made several unsuccessful attempts at a film career. Vidya then appeared in music videos for Euphoria, Pankaj Udhas, and Shubha Mudgal all directed by Pradeep Sarkar. She had her first film release with a leading role in Goutam Halder's Bengali film Bhalo Theko (2003). In 2005, she starred in Sarkar's Parineeta, an adaptation of Sarat Chandra Chattopadhyay's novel, which won her the Filmfare Award for Best Female Debut. Rajkumar Hirani's Lage Raho Munna Bhai (2006), a successful comedy sequel, saw her play a radio jockey opposite Sanjay Dutt.

Vidya played a variety of roles in 2007, including a woman suffering from multiple sclerosis in Mani Ratnam's drama Guru, a single mother in the comedy Heyy Babyy, and a dissociative identity disorder patient in the thriller Bhool Bhulaiyaa. All three films were commercially successful and established her as a leading lady. This was followed by two commercial failures in 2008. From 2009 to 2012, Vidya starred in five consecutive films that garnered her critical and commercial success. She played the mother of a child afflicted with progeria in Paa (2009), a seductive widow in Ishqiya (2010), and the real-life character of Sabrina Lal in No One Killed Jessica (2011). For portraying the actress Silk in the biopic The Dirty Picture, Vidya won the National Film Award for Best Actress. She next played a pregnant woman seeking revenge in the thriller Kahaani (2012), directed by Sujoy Ghosh. She was awarded the Filmfare Award for Best Actress for her roles in Paa, The Dirty Picture, and Kahaani, and the Filmfare Critics Award for Best Actress for Ishqiya.

Vidya failed to replicate this success in the next few years. This changed in 2017 when she played a radio jockey in Tumhari Sulu, for which she won another Best Actress Award at Filmfare. She also starred in the top-grossing ensemble drama Mission Mangal (2019). She then starred in the Amazon Prime Video streaming films Shakuntala Devi (2020), Sherni (2021), and Jalsa (2022), winning another Filmfare Critics Award for Best Actress for playing an Indian Forest Service officer in Sherni. Her highest-grossing release came with the comedy horror sequel Bhool Bhulaiyaa 3 (2024).

== Films ==
Vidya Balan filmography
Year	Title	Role	Language	Notes	Ref(s)
2003	Bhalo Theko	Anandi	Bengali		
2004	Kalari Vikraman	Kunjulakshmi	Malayalam	Unreleased	
2005	Parineeta	Lalita	Hindi		
2006	Lage Raho Munna Bhai	Jhanvi Sahni	Hindi		
2007	Guru	Meenakshi Saxena	Hindi		
2007	Salaam-e-Ishq	Tehzeeb Hussain Raina	Hindi		
2007	Eklavya: The Royal Guard	Rajjo Singh	Hindi		
2007	Heyy Babyy	Isha	Hindi		
2007	Bhool Bhulaiyaa	Avni Chaturvedi/ Manjulika	Hindi		
2007	Om Shanti Om	Cameo	Hindi	Special appearance in song "Deewangi Deewangi"	
2008	Halla Bol	Sneha Khan	Hindi		
2008	Kismat Konnection	Priya Saluja	Hindi		
2009	Paa	Dr. Vidya Bharadwaj	Hindi		
2010	Ishqiya	Krishna Verma	Hindi		
2011	No One Killed Jessica	Sabrina Lal	Hindi		
2011	The Dirty Picture	Reshma (Silk)	Hindi		
2011	Thank You	Divya Khurana	Hindi	Cameo	
2011	Dum Maaro Dum	Mrs. Kamath	Hindi	Cameo	
2011	Urumi	Bhoomi	Malayalam	Cameo	
2012	Kahaani	Vidya Venkatesan Bagchi	Hindi		
2012	Ferrari Ki Sawaari	Cameo	Hindi	Special appearance in song "Mala Jau De"	
2013	Ghanchakkar	Neetu Athray	Hindi		
2013	Bombay Talkies	Cameo	Hindi	Special appearance in song "Apna Bombay Talkies"	
2013	Once Upon a Time in Mumbai Dobaara!	Cameo	Hindi	Cameo	
2013	Mahabharat	Draupadi (voice)	Hindi	Animated film	
2014	Shaadi Ke Side Effects	Trisha Mallik	Hindi		
2014	Bobby Jasoos	Bilkis "Bobby" Ahmed	Hindi		
2015	Hamari Adhuri Kahani	Vasudha Prasad	Hindi		
2016	Te3n	Sarita Sarkar	Hindi		
2016	Kahaani 2: Durga Rani Singh	Vidya Sinha/Durga Rani Singh	Hindi		
2016	Ekk Albela	Geeta Bali	Marathi	Special appearance	
2017	Begum Jaan	Begum Jaan	Hindi		
2017	Tumhari Sulu	Sulochana "Sulu" Dubey	Hindi		
2018	Amoli	Narrator	English	Documentary	
2019	NTR: Kathanayakudu	Basavatarakam	Telugu		
2019	NTR: Mahanayakudu	Basavatarakam	Telugu		
2019	Nerkonda Paarvai	Kalyani Bharath	Tamil	Special appearance	
2019	Mission Mangal	Tara Shinde	Hindi		
2020	Natkhat	Surekha	Hindi	Short film; Producer also	
2020	Shakuntala Devi	Shakuntala Devi	Hindi		
2021	Sherni	Vidya Vincent	Hindi		
2022	Jalsa	Maya Menon	Hindi		
2023	Neeyat	Mira Rao	Hindi		
2024	Do Aur Do Pyaar	Kavya Ganeshan	Hindi		
2024	Bhool Bhulaiyaa 3	Mallika / Manjulika	Hindi		
2026	Raja Shivaji	Khadija Sultana	Marathi & Hindi	Bilingual	
2026	Jailer 2	Kantha Kalpak	Tamil		
2026	Mauja Hi Mauja †	TBA	Hindi	Filming	
2027	Untitled R.Balki film †	TBA	Tamil	Filming	
2027	Untitled Ritesh Batra film †	TBA	Hindi	Filming	

== Television ==
Vidya Balan in TV Series
Year	Title	Role	Notes	Ref.
1995	Hum Paanch	Radhika Mathur	TV series	
2014	No More Kamzor	Host	TV special	

== Music videos ==
Vidya Balan in music videos
Year	Title	Role	Performer(s)	Ref(s)
2002	"Aana Meri Gully"	Bengali bride	Euphoria	
2002	"Main Nashe Mein Hoon"	Bengali girl	Pankaj Udhas	
2003	"Kisson Ki Chadar"	Unknown	Shubha Mudgal	
2011	"Jaani Na"	Bengali wife	Chandrabindoo	

== See also ==
- List of awards and nominations received by Vidya Balan
