= List of awards and nominations received by Vidya Balan =

Vidya Balan awards and nominations
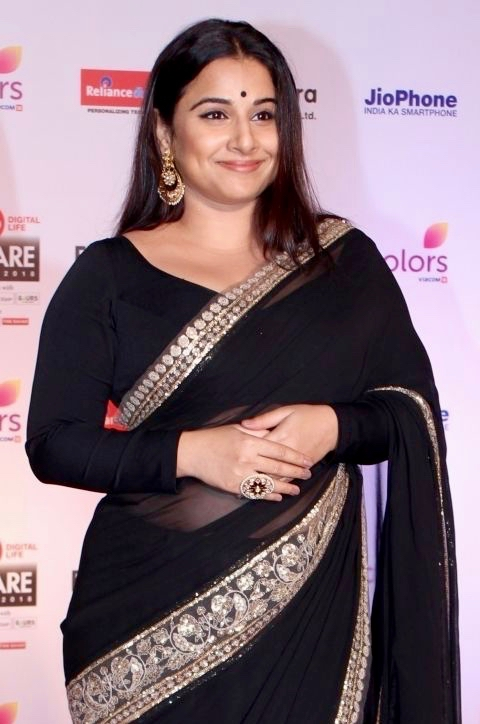
- Vidya at the 63rd Filmfare Awards, 2018
Awards and nominations
| Award | Wins | Nominations |
| BIG Star Entertainment Awards | 2 | 7 |
| Filmfare Awards | 7 | 17 |
| Screen Awards | 6 | 10 |
| Zee Cine Awards | 5 | 11 |
| Stardust Awards | 5 | 13 |
| Star Guild Awards | 1 | 3 |
| IIFA Awards | 4 | 13 |
| FICCI Frames Excellence Honours | 3 | 3 |
| Indian Film Festival of Melbourne | 1 | 4 |
| Producers Guild Film Awards | 5 | 6 |
| Nickelodeon Kids' Choice Awards India | 0 | 1 |
| National Film Awards | 1 | 1 |
| Global Film Awards | 3 | 3 |
| Lokmat Stylish Awards | 1 | 1 |
| Bollywood Film Journalist Awards | 3 | 3 |
| Padma Shri | 1 | 0 |

Totals (Note: Certain award groups do not simply award one winner. They acknowledge several different recipients, have runners-up, and have third place. Since this is a specific recognition and is different from losing an award, runner-up mentions are considered wins in this award tally. For simplification and to avoid errors, each award in this list has been presumed to have had a prior nomination.)
- Wins: 48
- Nominations: 96

Vidya Balan is an Indian actress who appears primarily in Hindi films. She has received several awards, including a National Film Award, seven Filmfare Awards, six Screen Awards, four International Indian Film Academy Awards, and five awards each from the Producers Guild and Zee Cine award ceremonies.

Vidya made her debut in 2003 with a leading role in the Bengali film Bhalo Theko, for which she won the Anandalok Award for Best Actress. In 2005, she had her first Bollywood release with the musical drama Parineeta, which garnered her a Best Female Debut award and a Best Actress nomination at the Filmfare Awards ceremony. For the role of a radio jockey in the 2006 horror comedy film Lage Raho Munna Bhai, she was nominated for the IIFA Award for Best Actress. In 2007, Vidya featured in five films. She portrayed a woman suffering from multiple sclerosis in the semi-biographical drama Guru and a dissociative identity disorder patient in the psychological thriller Bhool Bhulaiyaa. For the latter, she was nominated for a Filmfare Award for Best Actress.

From 2009 to 2012, Vidya played leading roles in films that earned her several accolades. For the role of a single mother in the 2009 comedy-drama Paa, Vidya won her first Best Actress award at Screen and Filmfare, among other honours. For her portrayal of a seductress in the 2010 black comedy Ishqiya, she was awarded the Filmfare Award for Best Actress (Critics) and garnered a Best Actress nomination at the same ceremony. She also won Best Actress awards at other ceremonies, including Screen, Zee Cine, and Producers Guild. Vidya portrayed film actress Silk in the 2011 biographical film The Dirty Picture, for which she won a National Film Award for Best Actress, along with a second Best Actress award at Filmfare, IIFA, Producers Guild, and Zee Cine, and a third consecutive award in the same category at Screen. Also that year, she received Best Actress nominations at Filmfare and Screen for the 2011 crime thriller No One Killed Jessica. For portraying a pregnant woman in search of her missing husband in the 2012 thriller Kahaani, Vidya won a fourth consecutive Best Actress Award at Screen, and a third Best Actress Award at Filmfare and IIFA. For playing a radio jockey in the 2017 comedy-drama Tumhari Sulu, Vidya won a fifth Screen Award and fourth Filmfare Award in the Best Actress category.

In addition to acting awards, Vidya received the Prabha Khaitan Puraskar in 2012 for her work towards the empowerment of women. In 2014, the Government of India honoured her with the Padma Shri, the fourth highest civilian award, for her contribution to the arts. In 2015, she received Raj Kapoor Special Contribution Award for outstanding contribution in Indian Cinema by the Government of Maharashtra.

== Anandalok Awards ==
The Anandalok Awards are awarded annually by the ABP Group in Kolkata to professionals of the Bengali and Hindi film industries. Vidya has won the award twice.

| Year (Note: In each table, refers to the year in which the ceremony was held.) | Nominated work | Category | Result | Ref. |
|---|---|---|---|---|
| 2004 | Bhalo Theko | Best Actress - Bengali | Won | |
| 2007 | Bhool Bhulaiyaa | Best Actress – Hindi | Won | |

== Asian Film Awards ==
The Asian Film Awards are presented annually by the Hong Kong International Film Festival Society to members of Asian cinema. Vidya has received one nomination.

| Year | Nominated work | Category | Result | Ref. |
|---|---|---|---|---|
| 2012 | The Dirty Picture | Best Actress | Nominated | |

== Asia-Pacific Film Festival ==
The Asia-Pacific Film Festival is organised by the Federation of Motion Picture Producers in Asia-Pacific. Vidya has received one nomination at the festival.

| Year | Nominated work | Category | Result | Ref. |
|---|---|---|---|---|
| 2012 | Kahaani | Best Actress | Nominated | |

== Asia Pacific Screen Awards ==
The Asia Pacific Screen Awards is an annual ceremony held by the Brisbane City Council, Australia in association with the United Nations Educational, Scientific and Cultural Organization and the Fédération Internationale des Associations de Producteurs de Films. Vidya has received one nomination.

| Year | Nominated work | Category | Result | Ref. |
|---|---|---|---|---|
| 2012 | The Dirty Picture | Best Actress | Nominated | |

== BIG Star Entertainment Awards ==
The BIG Star Entertainment Awards is an annual event organised by the Reliance Broadcast Network. Vidya has won two awards from seven nominations.

| Year | Nominated work | Category | Result | Ref. |
|---|---|---|---|---|
| 2010 | — | New Talent of the Decade – Female | Nominated | |
| 2010 | Ishqiya | Most Entertaining Film Actor – Female | Won | |
| 2011 | The Dirty Picture | Most Entertaining Film Actor – Female | Won | |
| 2012 | Kahaani | Most Entertaining Film Actor – Female | Nominated | |
| 2012 | Kahaani | Most Entertaining Actor in a Thriller Film – Female | Nominated | |
| 2013 | Ghanchakkar | Most Entertaining Actor in a Comedy Film – Female | Nominated | |
| 2014 | Bobby Jasoos | Most Entertaining Actor in a Comedy Film – Female | Nominated | |

== FICCI Frames Excellence Honours ==
The FICCI Frames Excellence Honours is an annual award ceremony organised by the Federation of Indian Chambers of Commerce and Industry. Vidya has won three awards.

| Year | Nominated work | Category | Result | Ref. |
|---|---|---|---|---|
| 2010 | Paa | Best Actress in a Leading Role | Won | |
| 2011 | Ishqiya | Best Actress in a Leading Role | Won | |
| 2012 | The Dirty Picture | Best Actress in a Leading Role | Won | |

== Filmfare Awards ==
Established in 1954, the Filmfare Awards are presented annually by The Times Group to members of the Hindi film industry. Vidya has won seven awards.

| Year | Nominated work | Category | Result | Ref. |
|---|---|---|---|---|
| 2006 | Parineeta | Best Female Debut | Won | |
| 2006 | Parineeta | Best Actress | Nominated | |
| 2008 | Bhool Bhulaiyaa | Best Actress | Nominated | |
| 2010 | Paa | Best Actress | Won | |
| 2011 | Ishqiya | Best Actress | Nominated | |
| 2011 | Ishqiya | Best Actress (Critics) | Won | |
| 2012 | No One Killed Jessica | Best Actress | Nominated | |
| 2012 | The Dirty Picture | Best Actress | Won | |
| 2013 | Kahaani | Best Actress | Won | |
| 2017 | Kahaani 2: Durga Rani Singh | Best Actress | Nominated | |
| 2018 | Tumhari Sulu | Best Actress | Won | |
| 2018 | Tumhari Sulu | Best Actress (Critics) | Nominated | |
| 2020 | Mission Mangal | Best Actress | Nominated | |
| 2021 | Shakuntala Devi | Best Actress | Nominated | |
| 2021 | Shakuntala Devi | Best Actress (Critics) | Nominated | |
| 2022 | Sherni | Best Actress | Nominated | |
| 2022 | Sherni | Best Actress (Critics) | Won | |
| 2025 | Do Aur Do Pyaar | Best Actress (Critics) | Nominated | |

== International Indian Film Academy Awards ==
The International Indian Film Academy Awards (shortened as IIFA) is annual international event organised by the Wizcraft International Entertainment Pvt. Ltd. to honour Bollywood artists. Vidya has won four awards from eleven nominations.

| Year | Nominated work | Category | Result | Ref. |
|---|---|---|---|---|
| 2006 | Parineeta | Star Debut of the Year – Female | Won | |
| 2006 | Parineeta | Best Actress | Nominated | |
| 2007 | Lage Raho Munna Bhai | Best Actress | Nominated | |
| 2008 | Bhool Bhulaiyaa | Best Actress | Nominated | |
| 2008 | Bhool Bhulaiyaa | Best Performance in a Negative Role | Nominated | |
| 2008 | Guru | Best Supporting Actress | Nominated | |
| 2010 | Paa | Best Actress | Won | |
| 2011 | Ishqiya | Best Actress | Nominated | |
| 2012 | The Dirty Picture | Best Actress | Won | |
| 2013 | Kahaani | Best Actress | Won | |
| 2018 | Tumhari Sulu | Best Actress | Nominated | |
| 2021 | Mission Mangal | Best Actress | Nominated | |
| 2022 | Sherni | Best Actress | Nominated | |
| 2025 | Bhool Bhulaiyaa 3 | Best Supporting Actress | Nominated | |

== National Film Awards ==
The National Film Awards are awarded by the Government of India's Directorate of Film Festivals division for achievements in the Indian film industry. Vidya has received one award.

| Year | Nominated work | Category | Result | Ref. |
|---|---|---|---|---|
| 2011 | The Dirty Picture | Best Actress | Won | |

== People's Choice Awards India ==
The Indian version of the American People's Choice Awards, the People's Choice Awards India, is awarded to recognize talents in Indian film, television, music and sports. Vidya has received one nomination.

| Year | Nominated work | Category | Result | Ref. |
|---|---|---|---|---|
| 2012 | Kahaani | Favourite Actress | Nominated | |

== Producers Guild Film Awards ==
The Producers Guild Film Awards (previously knows as Apsara Film & Television Producers Guild Awards) is an annual event originated by the Film Producers Guild of India. Vidya has received five awards.

| Year | Nominated work | Category | Result | Ref. |
|---|---|---|---|---|
| 2006 | Parineeta | Best Actress | Nominated | |
| 2006 | Parineeta | Best Female Debut | Won | |
| 2011 | Paa | Best Actress – Special Honour (Note: Some of the special honours were awarded to the films released in 2009, as there was no ceremony in 2010.) | Won | |
| 2011 | Ishqiya | Best Actress | Won | |
| 2012 | The Dirty Picture | Best Actress | Won | |
| 2013 | Kahaani | Best Actress | Won | |

== Screen Awards ==
The Screen Awards ceremony is organised by the Indian Express Limited to members of Hindi and Marathi cinema. Vidya has received six awards from ten nominations, including four consecutive Best Actress wins.

| Year | Nominated work | Category | Result | Ref. |
|---|---|---|---|---|
| 2006 | Parineeta | Best Female Debut | Won | |
| 2010 | Paa | Best Actress – Popular Choice | Nominated | |
| 2010 | Paa | Best Actress | Won | |
| 2011 | Ishqiya | Best Actress | Won | |
| 2012 | No One Killed Jessica | Best Actress | Nominated | |
| 2012 | The Dirty Picture | Best Actress | Won | |
| 2012 | The Dirty Picture | Best Actress – Popular Choice | Nominated | |
| 2013 | Kahaani | Best Actress – Popular Choice | Nominated | |
| 2013 | Kahaani | Best Actress | Won | |
| 2017 | Tumhari Sulu | Best Actress | Won | |

== Stardust Awards ==
The Stardust Awards are an annual event organised by Magna Publishing Company Limited. Vidya has won five awards from thirteen nominations.

| Year | Nominated work | Category | Result | Ref. |
|---|---|---|---|---|
| 2006 | Parineeta | Female Superstar of Tomorrow | Won | |
| 2007 | Lage Raho Munna Bhai | Female Superstar of Tomorrow | Nominated | |
| 2008 | Guru | Best Supporting Actress | Nominated | |
| 2010 | Paa | Female Star of the Year | Nominated | |
| 2011 | Ishqiya | Best Actress in a Thriller or Action | Won | |
| 2011 | Ishqiya | Female Star of the Year | Nominated | |
| 2012 | The Dirty Picture | Female Star of the Year | Won | |
| 2012 | The Dirty Picture | Best Actress in a Drama | Won | |
| 2012 | No One Killed Jessica | Best Actress in a Drama | Nominated | |
| 2012 | No One Killed Jessica | Female Star of the Year | Nominated | |
| 2013 | Kahaani | Female Star of the Year | Nominated | |
| 2013 | Kahaani | Best Actress in a Thriller or Action | Won | |
| 2014 | Bobby Jasoos | Best Actress in a Thriller or Action | Nominated | |

== Zee Cine Awards ==
The Zee Cine Awards are an annual award ceremony organised by the Zee Entertainment Enterprises. Vidya has received five awards.

| Year | Nominated work | Category | Result | Ref. |
|---|---|---|---|---|
| 2006 | Parineeta | Best Female Debut | Won | |
| 2006 | Parineeta | Best Actress | Nominated | |
| 2008 | Bhool Bhulaiyaa | Best Actress | Nominated | |
| 2011 | Ishqiya | Best Actress | Won | |
| 2012 | The Dirty Picture | Best Actress | Won | |
| 2012 | The Dirty Picture | Best Actress (Critics) | Won | |
| 2013 | Kahaani | Best Actress (Critics) | Won | |
| 2013 | Kahaani | Best Actress | Nominated | |
| 2017 | Kahaani 2: Durga Rani Singh | Best Actress | Nominated | |
| 2018 | Tumhari Sulu | Best Actor – Female (Viewer's Choice) | Nominated | |
| 2018 | Tumhari Sulu | Best Actor – Female (Jury's Choice) | Nominated | |

== Other awards and honours ==
| Year | Nominated work | Award | Category | Result | Ref. |
|---|---|---|---|---|---|
| 2014 | — | Padma Shri | — | Honoured | |
| 2015 | Outstanding Contribution in Indian Cinema | Raj Kapoor Special Contribution Award | – | Honoured | |
| 2016 | — | Indian Film Festival of Melbourne | Female Empowerment Award | Won | |
| 2018 | Tumhari Sulu | Indian Film Festival of Melbourne | Best Actress | Nominated | |
