= List of Indian Asia Pacific Screen Award winners and nominees =

This is a list of Indian Asia Pacific Screen Awards winners and nominees. This list details the performances of Indian actors, actresses, and films that have either been submitted or nominated for, or have won, an Asia Pacific Screen Award.

== Awards and nominations ==
Year (Ceremony)	Award	Recipient	Result	Note	Ref.
2007 (1st)	Best Screenplay	Feroz Abbas Khan; Gandhi, My Father	Won		
2008 (2nd)	Best Feature Film	Om Shanti Om	Nominated		
2008 (2nd)	Best Actor	Rajat Kapoor; The Prisoner	Nominated		
2008 (2nd)	Best Cinematography	Kiiran Deohans; Jodhaa Akbar	Nominated		
2008 (2nd)	Best Children's Feature Film	Mahek	Nominated		
2008 (2nd)	Jury Grand Prize	The Prisoner	Won		
2009 (3rd)	Best Director	Anurag Kashyap; Dev.D	Nominated		
2009 (3rd)	Best Actor	Naseeruddin Shah; A Wednesday!	Nominated		
2009 (3rd)	Best Screenplay	Yogesh Vinayak Joshi and Upendra Sidhaye; Mumbai My Life	Nominated		
2009 (3rd)	Best Children's Feature Film	Tahaan	Nominated		
2010 (4th)	Best Actor	Atul Kulkarni; Natarang	Nominated		
2010 (4th)	Best Actress	Tejaswini Pandit; Mee Sindhutai Sapkal	Nominated		
2010 (4th)	Best Cinematography	Sudheer Palsane; Vihir	Nominated		
2010 (4th)	Best Cinematography	Santosh Sivan and V. Manikandan; Raavan	Nominated		
2010 (4th)	Best Children's Feature Film	Udaan	Nominated		
2011 (5th)	Best Feature Film	Wedding Planners	Nominated		
2011 (5th)	Best Documentary Feature Film	Marathon Boy	Nominated	Indian-British-American co-production	
2011 (5th)	Best Documentary Feature Film	Pink Saris	Nominated	British-Indian co-production	
2012 (6th)	Best Director	Anurag Kashyap; Gangs of Wasseypur	Nominated		
2012 (6th)	Best Actor	Manoj Bajpayee; Gangs of Wasseypur	Nominated		
2012 (6th)	Best Actress	Vidya Balan; The Dirty Picture	Nominated		
2012 (6th)	Best Children's Feature Film	Gattu	Nominated		
2012 (6th)	Jury Grand Prize	Gangs of Wasseypur	Won		
2013 (7th)	Best Screenplay	Ritesh Batra; The Lunchbox	Won		
2013 (7th)	Best Documentary Feature Film	Menstrual Man	Nominated		
2013 (7th)	Best Animated Feature Film	The World of Goopi and Bagha	Nominated		
2013 (7th)	Best Cinematography	Rajeev Ravi; Monsoon Shootout	Nominated		
2013 (7th)	Jury Grand Prize	The Lunchbox	Won	Indian-French-German co-production	
2014 (8th)	Best Documentary Feature Film	Bidesia in Bambai	Nominated		
2014 (8th)	Best Youth Feature Film	Killa	Nominated		
2015 (9th)	Best Cinematography	Jean-Marc Ferrière; Sunrise	Nominated		
2015 (9th)	Best Animated Feature Film	Blinky Bill the Movie	Nominated	Australian-Indian-Irish co-production	
2016 (10th)	Best Director	Anurag Kashyap; Psycho Raman	Nominated		
2016 (10th)	Best Actor	Manoj Bajpayee; Aligarh	Won		
2016 (10th)	Best Actor	Nawazuddin Siddiqui; Psycho Raman	Special Mention		
2016 (10th)	Best Cinematography	Jay Oza; Psycho Raman	Nominated		
2016 (10th)	Best Screenplay	Gurvinder Singh and Waryam Singh Sandhu; The Fourth Direction	Nominated		
2016 (10th)	Best Screenplay	Leena Yadav and Supratik Sen; Parched	Nominated		
2016 (10th)	Best Youth Feature Film	The Quest	Nominated		
2016 (10th)	Best Youth Feature Film	The Trap	Nominated		
2017 (11th)	Best Director	Sanal Kumar Sasidharan; Sexy Durga	Nominated		
2017 (11th)	Best Actor	Rajkummar Rao; Newton	Won		
2017 (11th)	Best Cinematography	Shehnad Jalal; Lady of the Lake	Nominated		
2017 (11th)	Best Screenplay	Mayank Tewari and Amit V. Masurkar; Newton	Won		
2017 (11th)	Cultural Diversity Award (UNESCO)	Lady of the Lake	Special Mention		
2018 (12th)	Best Director	Ivan Ayr; Soni	Nominated		
2018 (12th)	Best Actor	Nawazuddin Siddiqui; Manto	Won		
2018 (12th)	Best Cinematography	Saumyananda Sahi; Balekempa	Nominated		
2018 (12th)	Best Documentary Feature Film	Up Down & Sideways	Nominated		
2018 (12th)	Best Youth Feature Film	Village Rockstars	Nominated		
2019 (13th)	Best Feature Film	The Gold-Laden Sheep and the Sacred Mountain	Nominated		
2019 (13th)	Best Actor	Manoj Bajpayee; Bhonsle	Won		
2019 (13th)	Best Cinematography	Saurabh Monga; The Gold-Laden Sheep and the Sacred Mountain	Nominated		
2019 (13th)	Cultural Diversity Award (UNESCO)	Bhonsle	Nominated		

- Nominations – 54
- Wins – 10
- Special Mentions – 2

== See also ==
- List of Indian submissions for the Academy Award for Best International Feature Film
