= Spandan Chaturvedi =

Indian actress

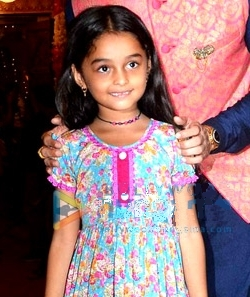
- Chaturvedi as Chakor on the sets of Udaan in 2015
- Born: 25 August 2007 (age 18); Ulhasnagar, Mumbai, Maharashtra, India
- Occupation: Actress
- Years active: 2012–2022
- Known for: Udaan as Chakor

Spandan Chaturvedi (born 25 August 2007) is an Indian former television child actress, who has had one role in a film since she became a teenager. Chaturvedi started her career with the 2012 drama series Ek Veer Ki Ardaas...Veera. After she appeared in several television advertisements. Later she was cast in Sanskaar - Dharohar Apnon Ki. Thereafter she appeared as cameo in The Suite Life of Karan & Kabir. In February 2014, Chaturvedi played the role of young Madhubala in Colors TV's show Madhubala – Ek Ishq Ek Junoon. But In August 2014 - February 2016 she portrayed the role 'Chakor' in Colors TV show Udaan, for which she became popular and won several awards, including the Zee Gold Award for Best Child Actor.

== Life and career ==
Spandan Chaturvedi was born on 25 August 2007 in Ulhasnagar, Mumbai, to Sunil Chaturvedi. She completed her first class studies in 2015. Chaturvedi is the cousin of Sparsh Khanchandani, who is also an actress.

Chaturvedi began her career with the 2012 Yash A Patnaik's drama series Ek Veer Ki Ardaas...Veera, in which she played the role of young Gunjan for the first few episodes. Thereafter Chaturvedi appeared in several television advertisements. Later she played the role of Aarvi in Colors TV's programme Sanskaar - Dharohar Apnon Ki. Chaturvedi appeared as cameo in Disney Channel's comedy series The Suite Life of Karan & Kabir. In February 2014, Chaturvedi was roped to play the daughter of Drashti Dhami's character in Ravindra Gautam's soap opera Madhubala – Ek Ishq Ek Junoon, in which she played the lead role of young Madhubala.

In August 2014, Chaturvedi featured to play the female protagonist in filmmaker Mahesh Bhatt's drama series Udaan, in which she portrayed the lead role of Chakor, a bonded labourer by birth, who faces challenges at the hands of Kamal Narayan (played by Sai Bilal), fighting to be freed from the bonds of slavery after being mortgaged by her parents Kasturi (played by Sai Deodhar) and Bhuvan (played by Rajiv Kumar). She received fame and critical acclaim for her performance in the series, and won the Zee Gold Award for Best Child Actor, Television Style Award for Most Stylish Nanhe Natkhat and Indian Television Academy Award for Most Promising Child Star - Female (Desh Ki Ladli/Beti). During the 100 episodes celebration, Chaturvedi injured herself when a marble table fell on her foot. She was hospitalised for at least ten days, and took one and a half months to recover.

In February 2015, Chaturvedi appeared as a guest in K9 Productions comedy series Comedy Nights with Kapil on Colors TV. In April 2015, Chaturvedi appeared in the print campaign of GR8! Television Magazine, she appeared along with Gautam Gulati on the cover of magazine with the hashtag "BeWithBeti".

== Filmography ==
=== Television ===
Year(s)	Title	Character
2012	Ek Veer Ki Ardaas...Veera	Young Gunjan Singh
2013–2014	Sanskaar - Dharohar Apnon Ki	Aarvi
2013	The Suite Life of Karan & Kabir	
2014	Madhubala - Ek Ishq Ek Junoon	Young Madhubala
2014–2016	Udaan	Young Chakor (Chauka) / Chunni
2015	Comedy Nights with Kapil	Herself
2016	Comedy Nights Bachao	Guest Appearance
2016	Jhalak Dikhhla Jaa 9	Contestant
2019	Laal Ishq	Meera
2019	Khatra Khatra Khatra	Herself

=== Films ===
Year	Title	Role	Language	Notes	Ref.
2019	The Sholay Girl	Young Reshma Pathan	Hindi	Released on ZEE5	
2020	Shakuntala Devi	Young Shakuntala Devi	Hindi		
2022	RRR	Young Sita	Telugu		

== Awards and nominations ==
Year	Award	Category	Work	Result	Ref.
2015	Indian Television Academy Awards	Most Promising Child Star - Female (Desh Ki Ladli/Beti)	Udaan	Won	
2015	Zee Gold Awards	Best Child Actress	Udaan	Won	
2016	Colors Golden Petal Awards	Best Child Actress	Udaan	Won	
