= Eeb Allay Ooo! =

2019 Indian comedy drama film

- Film poster
- Directed by: Prateek Vats
- Screenplay by: Shubham; Prateek Vats
- Story by: Shubham
- Produced by: Shwetaabh Singh; Prateek Vats
- Starring: Shardul Bharadwaj; Mahender Nath; Nutan Sinha; Shashi Bhushan; Naina Sareen
- Cinematography: Saumyananda Sahi
- Edited by: Tanushree Das
- Music by: Anshul Takkar
- Production company: NAMA Productions
- Distributed by: Outsider Pictures, US
- Release dates: October 2019 (Pingyao); 18 December 2020 (India)
- Running time: 97 minutes
- Country: India
- Language: Hindi

Eeb Allay Ooo! is a 2019 Indian Hindi-language film, directed by Prateek Vats, in his directorial debut, and written by Shubham. The film revolves around a young migrant in New Delhi, who takes the unusual government job of keeping monkeys away from public buildings, and focuses on his ensuing struggles and disillusionment with the work. The title is onomatopoeiac, as it derives from the three distinct sounds used by an experienced monkey chaser in the film to scare away the rhesus macaques.

Eeb Allay Ooo! premiered at the 2019 Pingyao International Film Festival. In 2020, the film was selected for the 70th Berlin International Film Festival and was screened as part of the We Are One: A Global Film Festival. The film was released theatrically in India on 18 December 2020. It won the Filmfare Award for the Best Film (Critics) announced in March 2021.

== Plot summary ==
Anjani hails from a migrant family originally from Bihar and lives with his pregnant sister and brother-in-law on the outskirts of Delhi. He has just joined the capital's monkey repeller squad. He is stationed outside government buildings in New Delhi – to drive away the monkeys so that the government officers can work undisturbed. However he can't harm the monkeys, which are associated with the god Hanuman. He is not comfortable in his new role, and is humiliated when a group of contractual workers lock him inside a cage, being set up to trap monkeys. His brother-in-law works as a security guard. The pay is modest, and a possible increment of Rs 1,500 a month means a lot for the family. But that comes with a catch, for he'll have to own a gun for his work – a condition that distresses his wife.

As the film progresses, Anjani realizes he is not capable of making the sounds as effectively as this colleague Mahender (who serves as his mentor in this job) to keep the monkeys away as desired. To cover up for his ineffectiveness, he uses a slingshot to injure a monkey and another time he dresses up as a langur to scare off the monkeys, both of which are deemed illegal. While the first of these misdeeds almost makes him lose the job, the other provokes the contractor to fire him. Anjani then starts navigating the city, asking people for jobs; hanging placards and listing his name and phone number on cars and in front of houses. Falling in love with a woman who lives nearby, they explore a softer side of the city in this otherwise bleak and uninspiring environment. Mahender provides some comfort by letting Anjani work with him, but Anjani then learns that Mahender has been lynched and killed by an angry mob after he accidentally kills one of the monkeys. The film ends with Anjani joining a religious Hindu procession and explores the moments of mischief and curiosity, of despair and desperation which shows the tragedy of migrant workers who are ostracized and expected to work as machines, with their existence remaining unacknowledged in this vast human civilisation.

== Cast ==
- Shardul Bharadwaj as Anjani Prasad
- Mahender Nath as Mahender
- Nutan Sinha as Anjani's sister
- Shashi Bhushan as Anjani's brother-in-law
- Nitin Goel as Narayan/Contractor
- Naina Sareen as Kumudh

== Production ==
=== Development ===
The idea of the film came to Vats after he read a news report on how under the Wildlife Protection Act, 1972, langurs could no longer be used to scare away monkeys at the Rashtrapati Bhawan, which is the seat of central government and bureaucracy, and how consequently authorities had employed people to dress up as langurs and imitate them to drive away the monkeys, who often caused a nuisance.

Vats said in an interview in The Times of India: "What we wanted to comment on was contractual jobs. The central character, Anjani, chases monkeys and through him (and others), we tell the story of people who make our cities, our houses, what they are, but remain invisible...Today, we are saying that migrant labourers have been given shabby treatment, but it doesn't really come as a surprise. There are many other examples. In 2010, during the Commonwealth Games, the slums were literally hidden, and those who live in those slums are people who built our cities."

In an interview in The Hindu, Vats said: "I was wondering whether to make a documentary or a mockumentary, but as we got into it, we decided to make it like an absurd fiction while keeping it very real, because only then would the absurdity work...While outwardly a satire, I hope the film is true to the internal complexities."

=== Filming ===
The filming was done in about 60 days in 2018. For the scenes featuring the monkey menace, the crew often had to wait for days to get the desired reactions from the monkeys, and throughout filming, there was a veterinarian on set.

The location sound was recorded single-handedly by Bigyna Dahal from FTII, who also doubled as a boom operator. This was done because most of the film had to be shot at sensitive and strategic locations near the Parliament of India where crowd control was near to impossible and signal jammers disrupted wireless devices.

== Release ==
The film received its world premiere at the Pingyao International Film Festival, China in 2019, and then premiered in India at the Mumbai Film Festival. In 2020, it featured in the We Are One: A Global Film Festival.

=== Critical reception ===
The film has been critically acclaimed. As of October 2021, the film holds a 100% approval rating on Rotten Tomatoes, based on 12 reviews with an average rating of 7.7/10.

Jay Weissberg of Variety said about the central performance and direction: "Bhardwaj captures the right mix of wounded pride, annoyance and exasperation, building up Anjani's energy until his clowning temporarily liberates the character from the humiliation. Much to his credit, Vats treats the real rhesus wranglers such as Mahinder with dignity and respect: when attempted by an amateur, the job seems silly, but in the hands of those trained to scare off the monkeys, the work becomes a necessary public service, done with aplomb and humor." Deborah Young of The Hollywood Reporter praised the cinematography and the original score in her review: "Saumyananda Sahi's eye-catching cinematography gives a keen sense of New Delhi's ever-hazy atmosphere with its stately government buildings and chaotic but colorful backstreets where the characters live, while Anshul Takkar's highly original score is based on sounds."

== Accolades ==
The film was selected for the Panorama section of the 70th Berlin International Film Festival in 2020. At the Mumbai Film Festival, it won the Golden Gateway Award in the India Gold section. The film won in two categories in Critics Choice Film Awards 2021, including the Best Feature Film and Directing.

=== Award and nominations ===
Award	Date of ceremony	Category	Recipient(s)	Result	Ref.
Filmfare Awards	27 March 2021	Best Film (Critics)	Prateek Vats	Won	
Filmfare Awards	27 March 2021	Best Actor (Critics)	Shardul Bhardwaj	Nominated	
Filmfare Awards	27 March 2021	Best Story	Shubham	Nominated	
Filmfare Awards	27 March 2021	Best Cinematography	Saumyananda Sahi	Nominated	
Filmfare Awards	27 March 2021	Best Sound Design	Bigyna Bhushan Dahal	Nominated	
