= Vidya Balan =

Indian film actress (born 1979)

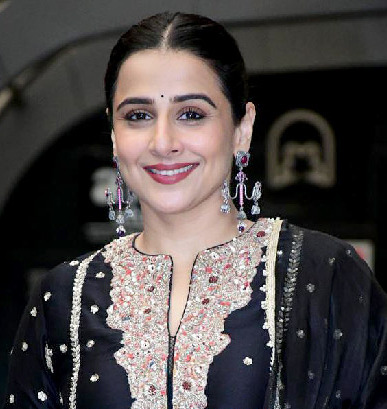
- Vidya in 2024
- Born: 1 January 1979 (age 47); Bombay, Maharashtra, India
- Education: University of Mumbai
- Occupation: Actress
- Years active: 1995–present
- Works: Full list
- Spouse: Siddharth Roy Kapur (m. 2012)
- Awards: Full list
- Honours: Padma Shri (2014)

Vidya Balan (pronounced [ʋɪd̪ːja baːlən]; born 1 January 1979) is an Indian actress. Known for pioneering a change in the portrayal of women in Hindi cinema with her roles in female-led films, she is the recipient of several awards, including a National Film Award and seven Filmfare Awards. She was awarded the Padma Shri by the Government of India in 2014.

Vidya aspired to a career in film from a young age and had her first acting role in the 1995 sitcom Hum Paanch. While pursuing a master's degree in sociology from the University of Mumbai, she made several unsuccessful attempts to start a career in film, and featured in television commercials and music videos. She made her film debut by starring in the Bengali film Bhalo Theko (2003) and received praise for her first Hindi film, the drama Parineeta (2005). This was followed by several commercial successes including Lage Raho Munna Bhai (2006) and Bhool Bhulaiyaa (2007), but her subsequent roles were met with negative reviews.

Vidya established herself by starring as headstrong women in five consecutive commercial successes, which also earned her critical and awards recognition. These were in the drama Paa (2009), the black comedy Ishqiya (2010), the thrillers No One Killed Jessica (2011) and Kahaani (2012), and the biopic The Dirty Picture (2011). The last of these won her the National Film Award for Best Actress. Following a downturn, Vidya made a career comeback by playing cheerful women balancing work and family life in Tumhari Sulu (2017) and Mission Mangal (2019). She then starred in the Amazon Prime Video films Shakuntala Devi (2020), Sherni (2021), and Jalsa (2022), and in the theatrical releases Bhool Bhulaiyaa 3 (2024) and Jailer 2 (2026).

Vidya also promotes humanitarian causes and supports the empowerment of women. She is a member of the Indian Central Board of Film Certification and has hosted a radio show. Early in her career, she drew criticism for her fluctuating weight and dress sense, but was later credited in the media for her unconventionality. Vidya is married to the film producer Siddharth Roy Kapur.

== Early life and initial career struggles ==
Vidya was born on 1 January 1979 in Bombay (present-day Mumbai) into a Tamil Brahmin Iyer family. Her father, P. R. Balan, worked as the executive vice-president of Digicable, and her mother, Saraswathy, is a homemaker. According to Vidya, they speak a mix of Tamil and Malayalam at her home in Palakkad, Kerala. Her elder sister, Priya Balan, works in advertising. Actress Priyamani is her second cousin. Vidya grew up in the suburban neighbourhood of Chembur and studied at St. Anthony Girls' High School.

From a young age, Vidya aspired to a career in film and was inspired by the work of actresses Shabana Azmi and Madhuri Dixit. At the age of 16, she starred in the first season of Ekta Kapoor's sitcom Hum Paanch as Radhika, a bespectacled teenager. After the series ended, Vidya refused director Anurag Basu's offer to star in a television soap opera, as she wanted to concentrate on a film career. Her parents were supportive of the decision but encouraged her to complete her education first. She then studied at St. Xavier's College, Mumbai, to pursue a bachelor's degree in sociology and later earned a master's degree from the University of Mumbai.

While pursuing her master's degree, Vidya was cast as the female lead in the Malayalam film Chakram, opposite Mohanlal and was subsequently signed on for 12 other Malayalam language films. However, due to production difficulties, Chakram was shelved. The postponement of a film starring Mohanlal was an unheard of occurrence in Malayalam cinema and producers blamed Vidya for bringing "bad luck" to the project; labelled her as a "jinx"; and replaced her in the films that she had been contracted for. She shifted focus to Tamil cinema. In 2001, she was cast as the female lead in N. Linguswamy's Run (2002), opposite R. Madhavan. However, after completing the first shooting schedule, she was unceremoniously dropped and replaced by Meera Jasmine. She was signed up under false pretences for a sex comedy, a genre she was uncomfortable with, and decided to leave the project. She was again replaced by Meera Jasmine in Bala (2002). Thereafter, she signed on for a third Tamil film, Manasellam (2003), but was replaced by Trisha as the director was dissatisfied with her work. Kalari Vikraman, another Malayalam film that she completed work for in 2003, failed to get a theatrical release. After failing to start a film career, Vidya appeared in approximately 60 television commercials and in music videos for Euphoria and Shubha Mudgal; a majority of these were directed by Pradeep Sarkar.

== Career ==
=== Early work (2003–2008) ===
Vidya's film debut came with the Bengali film Bhalo Theko (2003), a drama directed by Goutam Halder. He cast her for the combination of innocence and experience that he found in her in the central role of Aanandi, a young woman reminiscing about her past. Vidya was ecstatic about her involvement in Bengali cinema, later calling it a dream come true and highlighting its contribution to her subsequent progress. She was awarded an Anandalok Purashkar for Best Actress for her performance. On Pradeep Sarkar's recommendation, Vidya auditioned for the lead role in his directorial venture—the Hindi film Parineeta (2005). The film's producer Vidhu Vinod Chopra initially preferred an established actress for the part but agreed to cast Vidya after she underwent six months of extensive tests. Based on Sarat Chandra Chattopadhyay's 1914 Bengali novel of the same name, Parineeta tells the love story between Shekhar (played by Saif Ali Khan), the son of the local zamindar, and Lalita (Vidya), the dignified daughter of the family's tenant. Vidya's performance received praise from critics; Derek Elley of Variety found her to be an "acting revelation", adding that her "devoted but dignified Lalita is the picture's heart and soul". At the annual Filmfare Awards ceremony, she won Best Female Debut and received a nomination for Best Actress.

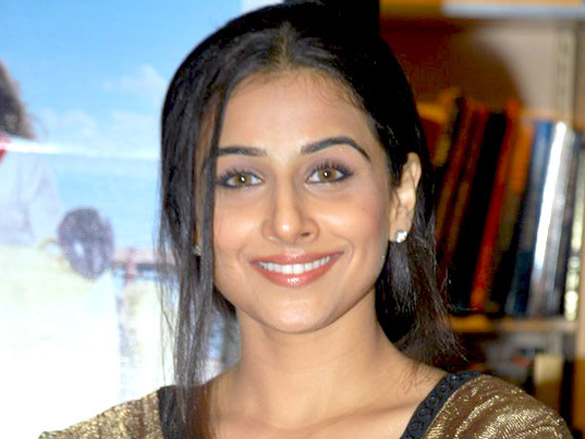
Vidya at the launch of a book based on her film Lage Raho Munna Bhai in 2006

Continuing her collaboration with Chopra's company, Vidya starred opposite Sanjay Dutt in Rajkumar Hirani's comedy film Lage Raho Munna Bhai (2006). She played a radio jockey and the title character's love interest, for which she met up with radio hosts and watched them at work. While she acknowledged not having a substantial role in the film, she agreed to the project as part of a conscious effort to work in different genres to avoid being typecast in her Parineeta image. With earnings of ₹1.19 billion (US$12 million), Lage Raho Munna Bhai emerged as one of the highest-grossing Hindi films at that point. Vidya began 2007 by accepting the supporting role of a multiple sclerosis patient in Mani Ratnam's drama Guru, starring Abhishek Bachchan and Aishwarya Rai, citing her desire to work with Ratnam. Raja Sen of Rediff.com bemoaned that she was "somewhat wasted in a role that isn't as well-etched". Her next two roles, in the ensemble films Salaam-e-Ishq and Eklavya: The Royal Guard, were similarly small, but she defended these choices as having been "part of my learning curve". Both films performed poorly at the box office, but the latter was selected as India's entry for the 80th Academy Awards. Citing date issues, Vidya refused Pradeep Sarkar and Sudhir Mishra's offers to star in their films Laaga Chunari Mein Daag and Khoya Khoya Chand, respectively; she has said that both filmmakers were upset with her decision.

In her next release of 2007, the comedy Heyy Babyy, she starred opposite Akshay Kumar in her first glamorous, westernised role. Her look was poorly received, with Namrata Joshi of Outlook writing, "Vidya is irritating, over-the-top, extremely affected and looks ghastly in figure-hugging frocks." She next teamed with Kumar once again in Bhool Bhulaiyaa, a comedy horror film from Priyadarshan, which served as a remake of the Malayalam film Manichitrathazhu (1993). Played by Shobana in the original, Vidya was challenged by the role of a woman suffering from dissociative identity disorder; in preparation, she stayed in isolation for three days and once collapsed on set. Moreover, she was intimidated by the dancing that her role required and began learning kathak days before filming her scenes. Despite disliking the film and Vidya's dancing, Khalid Mohamed found her "bankably likeable", and Taran Adarsh described her as "splendid". Both Heyy Babyy and Bhool Bhulaiyaa were among the highest-grossing Hindi films of the year. The latter earned her a second Best Actress nomination at Filmfare.

In 2008's Halla Bol, based on the life of activist Safdar Hashmi, Vidya played a supporting role opposite Ajay Devgn. She next took on a glamorous role once again in the romantic comedy Kismat Konnection, co-starring Shahid Kapoor. She explained her choice of this part as a deliberate attempt to move away from her comfort zone, but she found it difficult to dance alongside Kapoor. Elvis D'Silva of Rediff.com found Vidya to be "woefully miscast" and criticised her look and wardrobe, as did Shubhra Gupta of The Indian Express, who dismissed her as "determinedly frumpy". Both films had poor box office returns. Addressing her failure in portraying glamorous roles, Vidya has said that such parts did not suit her personality and blamed herself for "a complete lack of conviction on my part".

=== Established actress (2009–2012) ===
Vidya's career prospects improved in 2009 when R. Balki cast her in his comedy-drama Paa. She played a single mother struggling with her son's (played by Amitabh Bachchan) progeria. She was initially sceptical about playing the part, wondering if she could be maternal towards an actor of Bachchan's stature, who is over 30 years her senior. After insisting on a look test with Bachchan, she said that his effective transformation into a young boy had convinced her to accept the part. Comparing her acting style to that of Dimple Kapadia, the critic Sukanya Verma wrote, "Balan is poignant yet restrained and projects an impressive figure of grace and integrity"; Nikhat Kazmi of The Times of India commended her for lending a "rare dignity to the image of the Bollywood mom". Paa was a commercial success, and won Vidya the Filmfare Award and Screen Award for Best Actress. Vidya has said that the film's reception gave her "courage to stick to my conviction".

Vidya described her next role, in Abhishek Chaubey's black comedy Ishqiya (2010), to be "an epitome of grey". In a departure from her wholesome on-screen persona, she starred as a seductive, manipulative widow from a village in Uttar Pradesh. The part required her to master the local dialect, which also involved the use of profanity. Anupama Chopra opined, "Vidya Balan's smoldering looks scorch the screen even as her eyes hint at tragedy. She proves that she is miles ahead of the cookie cutter Barbie dolls that clutter Bollywood and that sensuality has very little to do with showing skin." Vidya's work won her the Filmfare Critics Award for Best Actress, a second consecutive Best Actress award at Screen, and a nomination for Best Actress at Filmfare.

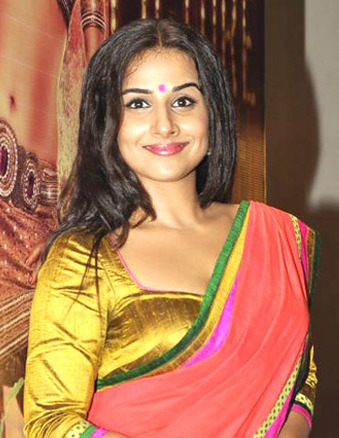
Vidya at an event for The Dirty Picture (2011), for which she won the National Film Award for Best Actress

The year 2011 was key in Vidya's career, as she had starring roles in two commercially successful female-led films. In No One Killed Jessica, a thriller based on the murder of Jessica Lal, and co-starring Rani Mukerji, Vidya played the real-life character of Sabrina, who seeks justice for her sister's murder. Vidya was styled in men's dresses and loose-fitted clothing; several scenes were shot on location using hidden cameras, and she was pleased with the anonymity that her styling provided. Moreover, she spoke positively of her rapport with Mukerji, noting the rarity of two leading ladies within the same Hindi film. Sudhish Kamath of The Hindu took note of Vidya's ability to be "in sublime control over her emotions" and Savera Someshwar of Rediff.com added that "her hesitant body language, her faith, her helplessness, her rage, her sorrow and her gratitude all come across beautifully". Vidya earned another Filmfare nomination for Best Actress. In the same year, she made a guest appearance in the Malayalam film Urumi and a retrospective of her films was held in Australia as part of the Bollywood and Beyond festival.

The New York Times reported that with her role in The Dirty Picture (2011), a drama based on the controversial Indian actress Silk Smitha, Vidya had "redefine[d] the Hindi film heroine". She was challenged by the overwhelming sexuality in the role, and spoke of the mental preparation she put into achieving a balance between the character's mix of innocence, vulnerability, and sex appeal. She gained 12 kilograms (26 lb) to look the part. Khalid Mohamed observed of Vidya, "She's extraordinary: gutsy, consistently in character and unafraid of exposing her darker side. Here's the kind of complex performance which you haven't evidenced in years and years." With worldwide earnings of ₹1.14 billion (US$12 million), The Dirty Picture emerged as Hindi cinema's highest-grossing female-led film to that point. Vidya won another Filmfare and Screen Award, in addition to the National Film Award for Best Actress.

She next starred in the thriller Kahaani (2012), directed by Sujoy Ghosh. Set in Kolkata during the Durga Puja festivities, the film starred Vidya as a pregnant woman in search of her missing husband. Made on a shoestring budget, it was shot for over 64 days in the streets of Kolkata by means of guerrilla filmmaking. Vidya drew media attention for wearing a prosthetic belly while promoting the film. Pratim D. Gupta of The Telegraph wrote that Vidya "gets into the physicality of a pregnant woman with unfailing mastery". Sanjukta Sharma of Mint summarised, "Balan’s existence, and indeed her flourishing, says something about the Hindi film industry finally breaking away from the 'heroine' mould." As with The Dirty Picture, Kahaani too emerged among the biggest earning female-led Hindi films, grossing over ₹1.04 billion (US$11 million) worldwide. Vidya won a fourth consecutive Best Actress Award at Screen and a third Best Actress Award at Filmfare.

=== Setback and resurgence (2013–2019) ===
After serving as a jury member at the 2013 Cannes Film Festival, Vidya starred in the comic thriller Ghanchakkar (2013). Playing a boisterous Punjabi woman opposite Emraan Hashmi, she explained that unlike her previous few films, her part in it was secondary to the male star. Sarit Ray of Hindustan Times dismissed her "shrill, garish-dressing, magazine-devouring Punjabi housewife" character as "caricature-ish". Vidya then provided the voice of Draupadi for Mahabharat, an animation film based on the Indian epic of the same name. She began 2014 with Shaadi Ke Side Effects, a romantic comedy about a married couple, in which she was pitted opposite Farhan Akhtar. Critics liked their chemistry, but were unimpressed with the film. She was next drawn to the title role of an aspiring detective in the comedy-mystery film Bobby Jasoos, after connecting with the character's struggle to prove herself. It required her to sport 12 elaborate disguises, and she trained with a language coach to adopt a Hyderabadi accent. Rohit Khilnani of India Today was appreciative of Vidya's performance but disliked the film's script and execution. All of these films were commercially unsuccessful, which led Vidya to admit that she felt "devastated" by their reception.

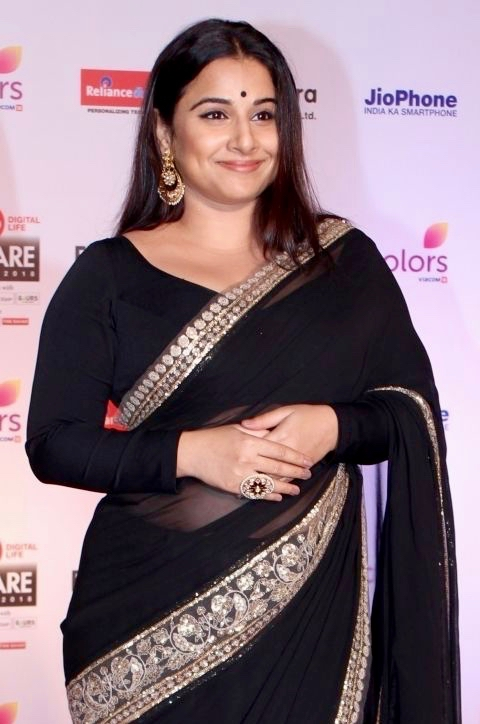
Vidya at the 63rd Filmfare Awards, where she won her fourth Best Actress award for Tumhari Sulu (2017)

The series of poorly received films continued with the romantic drama Hamari Adhuri Kahani (2015). The writer Mahesh Bhatt, who based the film on his own mother, was keen to have Vidya play the lead role of a domestic abuse survivor. Shubha Shetty-Saha of Mid-Day bemoaned that she had been "saddled with a boring, outdated, weepy character" and that "there was nothing much even she could do". The following year, she took on the supporting part of a police officer in Te3n (2016), a thriller inspired by the 2013 South Korean film Montage, co-starring Amitabh Bachchan and Nawazuddin Siddiqui. She was drawn to playing a woman who commands respect and identified with her "silent aggression". Rajeev Masand criticised the film's predictable denouement, but liked Vidya's ability to act through gestures. She then portrayed the actress Geeta Bali in multiple songs for Ekk Albela, a Marathi-language biopic of Bhagwan Dada. Journalists speculated if Kahaani 2: Durga Rani Singh (2016), a spiritual sequel to Kahaani, would help overcome her career decline. It was not as well-received as the first film, but Vidya received a Best Actress nomination at Filmfare for her portrayal of a child sexual abuse survivor. In a mixed review of the film, Raja Sen of Rediff.com wrote that "with tremendous commitment to the part, [Vidya] gives us a stirring performance free of vanity or obviousness".

In Srijit Mukherji's period drama Begum Jaan (2017), a remake of the filmmaker's own Bengali film Rajkahini (2015), Vidya played the title role of a procurer from the 1940s. She worked with Mukherji to provide a backstory to her character and researched the era by reading The Other Side of Silence; filming in the barren landscape of rural Jharkhand was physically daunting for her. Anna M. M. Vetticad of Firstpost wrote that she "issues one-liners in a monotone, but is unable to dig deep and summon up a relatable human being". Vidya next played Sulu, a spirited housewife who moonlights as a talk radio host of a relationship counselling show, in the comedy-drama Tumhari Sulu. She identified with her character's lively personality and was pleased to play a rare comic part. She drew on her experience of playing a radio jockey in Lage Raho Munna Bhai and listened to late-night radio shows. Writing for The Times of India, Neil Soans commended Vidya for "infusing Sulu with an abundance of infectious optimism without being aggravating", and Shubhra Gupta complimented the way she used "her distinctive voice and full-bellied laughter to invest Sulu with real warmth". NDTV listed her performance as the best by a Hindi film actress that year, and she won her fifth Screen Award and fourth Filmfare Award for Best Actress. It also proved to be Vidya's first commercial success since 2012; she called the film's reception a "major confidence booster".

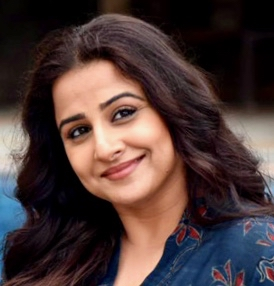
Vidya promoting Mission Mangal in 2019

Vidya expanded into South Indian cinema in 2019, with roles in the two-part Telugu biopic, N.T.R: Kathanayakudu and N.T.R: Mahanayakudu, and the Tamil drama Nerkonda Paarvai. In the former two, about the actor-politician N. T. Rama Rao, she played Rao's first wife. Both films failed commercially. In Nerkonda Paarvai, a remake of the courtroom drama Pink (2016), she briefly played the wife of Ajith Kumar's character. Although not keen on remakes, she agreed to the project to bring attention to its theme of sexual consent. Srinivasa Ramanujam of The Hindu dismissed the portions involving Vidya as inessential. It emerged as one of the highest-grossing Tamil films of the year. Vidya teamed with Akshay Kumar for the third time in Mission Mangal, about the Mars Orbiter Mission, which marked India's first interplanetary expedition. She liked the idea of playing a seemingly ordinary homemaker who balances her family life with her work as a scientist, and she was also pleased to work with four other leading ladies. Joe Leydon of Variety found Vidya to be "drop-dead perfect from wire to wire", and she was awarded with another Best Actress nomination at Filmfare. With global earnings of ₹2.9 billion (US$30 million), Mission Mangal emerged as her biggest grosser to that point.

=== Streaming films (2020–present) ===
The short film Natkhat (2020), about a mother teaching her young son about gender equality, marked Vidya's debut production venture. It premiered on YouTube as part of the We Are One: A Global Film Festival. She then portrayed mental calculator Shakuntala Devi in an eponymous biopic, which due to the COVID-19 pandemic could not release theatrically and instead streamed on Amazon Prime Video, marking her first of a string of collaborations with producer Vikram Malhotra of Abundantia Entertainment. Director Anu Menon cast Vidya in the role as she believed that Devi's "gregarious and flamboyant" personality matched that of the actress; in preparation, Vidya listened to interviews of Devi's daughter and husband, and watched online videos of Devi. Mike McCahill of The Guardian praised Vidya's "all-shotguns-blazing performance" and The Hindu's Kenneth Rosario took note of her "ability to smoothly transition between age and appearances, but even she can't salvage a rather mawkish finale to the film". She received two more Filmfare nominations for her performance in it.

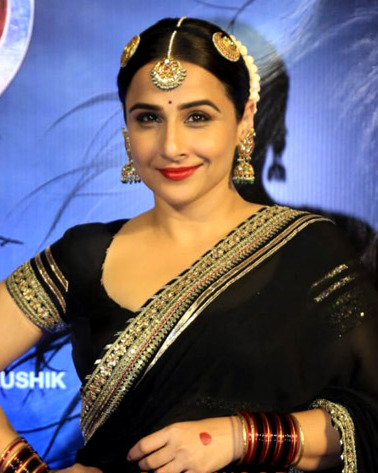
Vidya promoting Bhool Bhulaiyaa 3 in 2024

The following year, Vidya starred as an Indian Forest Service officer tracking a man-eating tigress in the environmental thriller Sherni (2021), produced again by Malhotra and premiered on Amazon Prime Video. In preparation, she met two forest officers and went on forest trails with them, and read Peter Wohlleben's book The Hidden Life of Trees. Sukanya Verma opined that Vidya's "refreshingly subdued portrayal" was a departure from the "self-aware feminist" roles that she had previously played. She was awarded with another Filmfare Critics Award for Best Actress for her performance. Vidya next starred alongside Shefali Shah in the thriller Jalsa (2022), which marked her third consecutive film to release on Amazon Prime Video, her third consecutive collaboration with Malhotra and a reunion with Tumhari Sulu writer and director Suresh Triveni. She played a journalist involved in a hit-and-run, a morally ambiguous character that she was initially hesitant to play. Monika Rawal Kukreja of Hindustan Times believed that the performances of Vidya and Shah had enhanced a mediocre picture.

Vidya led an ensemble cast in Menon's murder mystery Neeyat (2023), which marked her first film to receive a theatrical release since Mission Mangal in 2019, and was again produced by Malhotra. She has said that unlike the usual portrayal of detectives as flamboyant, including her own in Bobby Jasoos, her character in Neeyat was "quirky, socially awkward and unusual". In an unfavourable review, Scroll.in's Nandini Ramnath termed both the film and Vidya's performance "serviceable". The film had minuscule box-office earnings. The following year, Vidya and Pratik Gandhi played an unhappily married couple in the romantic comedy Do Aur Do Pyaar; it marked her first film release since the pandemic to not be produced by Malhotra, and a reunion with Tumhari Sulu producer Atul Kasbekar. An adaptation of the 2017 film The Lovers, it failed to find a wide audience theatrically despite positive reviews.

After rejecting Anees Bazmee's offer to feature in the 2022 comedy horror sequel Bhool Bhulaiyaa 2, Vidya agreed to star in the third instalment Bhool Bhulaiyaa 3 (2024) particularly due to her desire to work alongside Madhuri Dixit. Reviewers for The Hindu and Mint bemoaned how both Vidya and Dixit were underutilised in the film. Bhool Bhulaiyaa 3 marked a commercial resurgence for the actress, earning ₹4.17 billion (US$43 million) worldwide to rank as the second highest-grossing Hindi film of 2024 and Vidya's highest-grossing release.

== Personal life and off-screen work ==
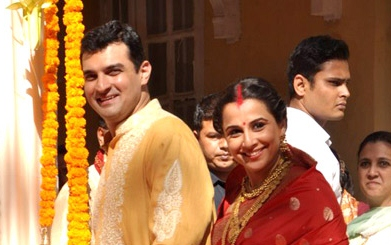
Vidya and Siddharth Roy Kapur at their wedding ceremony in December 2012

The mass media has often speculated about a romantic relationship between Vidya and her co-actors, but she has strongly denied these reports. In 2009, Vidya was involved in a controversy when she mentioned a previous relationship in which "caustic remarks" were made at her due to her weight. She said, "If someone who matters to you takes you down, it can break you. That someone whose approval mattered to me started to constantly find faults with me. At that point of time, it was important to walk away from that relationship." Though she refused to name the person, tabloid reports suggested that she was referring to Shahid Kapoor (her co-star in Kismat Konnection). Kapoor, however, denied the allegations. During an interview in May 2012, Vidya announced that she was dating Siddharth Roy Kapur, the CEO of UTV Motion Pictures. On 14 December 2012, the couple were married in a private ceremony in Bandra, Mumbai.

Vidya is trained in Carnatic music and briefly studied the dance forms of Bharatnatyam and Kathak. Regarding her religious affiliations, Vidya said, "I am a person with a lot of faith and I have conversations [with God] all the time but I am not so religious in the conventional, organised sense". She practices vegetarianism and was listed as "India's hottest vegetarian" in polls conducted by PETA in 2011 and 2012. Her weight fluctuations over the years have been the subject of substantial media coverage in India.

In March 2011, Vidya endorsed World Wildlife Fund's Earth Hour campaign in India. She campaigned for the cause of nutrition in India for Child In Need Institute (CINI), a non-profit organisation based in Kolkata. In September 2012, Vidya visited a village in Mirzapur, Uttar Pradesh, where she participated in a campaign to promote children's education and the empowerment of women. For her attempts to empower women, Vidya was awarded the Prabha Khaitan Puraskar 2012 by the Calcutta Chamber of Commerce; she was the youngest recipient of the award. In 2012, she became the first brand ambassador of the country's sanitation programme, later renamed as the Swachh Bharat Abhiyan. Since then, she has been part of a nationwide television and radio campaign aimed to increase construction and use of toilets.

In 2013, Vidya served as the grand marshal of the India Day parade held in New York City. In the same year, she launched a technology-based learning platform for underprivileged children in the Thanapur village of Uttar Pradesh. Also that year, Vidya featured as the host of No More Kamzor, a television special on women empowerment. On the occasion of International Women's Day in 2015, Vidya wrote an opinion column in Hindustan Times on the issues faced by women in India. In August 2017, Vidya was made a member of the Indian Central Board of Film Certification, to certify films for theatrical exhibition. The following year, she became the goodwill ambassador of Arpan, an NGO that creates awareness on sexual abuse. In 2019, she collaborated with BIG FM 92.7 to host a radio show named "Dhun Badal Ke Toh Dekho". Vidya became the global brand ambassador for ethnic wear brand Shobitam in 2023.

== Media image and artistry ==
Following the success of Parineeta and Lage Raho Munna Bhai, Vidya's film roles were subject to wide critical analysis. Vir Sanghvi noted that the films Heyy Babyy and Kismat Konnection were "strange films [...] in which she tried to pretend to be what she is not — a Bollywood bimbette." Vidya described that particular phase in her career as a "struggle to be someone else". Due to the criticism that her film choices evoked, Vidya decided to choose roles that she "believed in" rather than choose by convention. Members of the media have subsequently labelled her as "bold" and "daring" in her choices.

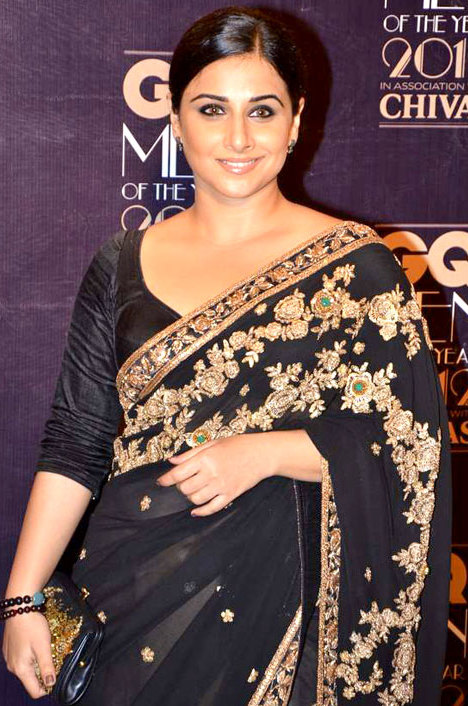
Vidya at the GQ Men of the Year Awards, 2013

Her starring roles in Heyy Babyy and Kismat Konnection also led to considerable attention in the media for her "questionable wardrobe". Several publications listed her as the "worst dressed actress" and her costume designers attributed her failure to carry off western clothes due to her weight and body structure. She was later praised in the media for wearing saris at public events; designer Niharika Khan explained, "Vidya's beauty lies in her curves. She's comfortable in her voluptuousness, and therefore in a sari." Vidya has since been identified as defying "an anglicised idea of sexuality" and embodying the idea of "raw Indian sexuality".

After portraying strong-willed protagonists in Paa, Ishqiya, No One Killed Jessica, The Dirty Picture and Kahaani, Vidya was credited in the media for pioneering a movement that breaks the stereotypical portrayal of heroines in Bollywood. The major commercial success of the latter two earned her the title of a "female hero" and Kalpana Nair of Firstpost noted that with these two films Vidya spearheaded a change in the roles that were offered to actresses over 30. Critic Mayank Shekhar predicted, "Just a few smart male actors can completely change the face of a commercial, star-driven film industry. Looking at [...] Vidya Balan [...] it appears, that change could well originate from the leading lady instead." In 2023, Rajeev Masand named her one of Hindi cinema's best actresses.

India Today featured Vidya in their 2012 listing of the nation's most powerful women and noted that "she has toppled the all dominating hero, reducing him to a supporting role in a male dominated film industry". Vidya was featured by Forbes India in their annual Celebrity 100 list in 2012 and 2013. She occupied the top slot in Rediff.com's annual listing of the year's best performances for two consecutive years (2010–11). She also featured in the list for the years 2005, 2006, 2009, 2012, and 2016. In 2012, the magazine Verve featured her as one of India's "Young Power Women" and wrote, "In a reel world peopled by size zero-toned bodies and pretty-as-a-picture heroines, Vidya comes across as completely real and natural – a woman who has followed her own instincts and dared to live her destiny by being her own person and not morphing herself to fit into any conventional slot." Two years later, the magazine listed her as a power icon. In 2018, The Economic Times considered Vidya to be one of the most prominent celebrity brand ambassadors in India. She was also inducted into the Bollywood Walk of Fame at Bandra Bandstand, where her hand print was preserved.

In 2014, Vidya was awarded the Padma Shri, the fourth highest civilian award in India, for her contributions to the entertainment industry. The following year, she received an honorary Doctor of Arts degree from Rai University; the university also named a scholarship program for underprivileged girls after her. The chancellor of the university, Harbeen Arora said, "Among the league of iconic actors, Vidya is a pioneer in every way. Her films epitomise a distinct Indianness and a powerful womanhood". She was invited by the Academy of Motion Picture Arts and Sciences to join the Actors Branch in 2021.

== Work and accolades ==
Among Vidya's film awards are a National Film Award for Best Actress for The Dirty Picture (2011); and seven Filmfare Awards: Best Female Debut for Parineeta (2005); Best Actress for Paa (2009), The Dirty Picture (2011), Kahaani (2012), and Tumhari Sulu (2017); and Best Actress (Critics) for Ishqiya (2010), and Sherni (2021).

=== Honours ===
- Vidya received Padma Shri, the fourth-highest civilian award by the government of India (2014).
