= Bigyna Dahal =

- Born: Sikkim, India
- Education: Sound Design, FTII

Bigyna Dahal (Bigyna Bhushan Dahal) is a sound designer and location sound recordist from Sikkim, India who has worked on several Indian films. His films have been screened and won awards at several international film festivals including Busan International Film Festival, Pingyao International Film Festival in China,MAMI Mumbai Film Festival. He has also won best sound design awards at many festivals including Filmfare Award for Best Sound – Marathi and Filmfare OTT Awards. and Best Sound Design (Series) for Khauf at the Filmfare OTT Awards 2025.

== Education and work ==
He is a graduate of FTII, Pune where he specialised in Sound Recording and Sound Design and three of his student films were awarded the National Award in the best short Film category. After finishing studies he moved to Mumbai and has been working on various feature films and documentaries.Busan International Film Festival He is associated with films like Ralang Road, Shahid, Mantra, Peddlers and Asha Jawar Majhe (LABOUR of LOVE) which won the National Award for Best Sound Design in 2015. Bigyna also holds a degree in Physics with Photography from Fergusson college,

== Filmography ==
Year	Language	Title			Film Festivals
2025	Hindi	Khauf	Sound Design		Winner Best Sound Design Filmfare OTT Awards 2025 (Best Sound Design (Series))
2024	Hindi	Jal Tu Jalaal Tu |	Sound Design and Mix	Prateek Vats	MAMI Select: Filmed on iPhone
2023		Toras Husband	Sound Designer		Bushan International Film Festival
2023		Last Days of Summer	Sound Designer		IFFR
2023		Which Colour	Sound Designer		IFFR
2022		Nazarband	Sound Designer		Pune International Film Festival
2020	Hindi	Green Blackberries	Sound Designer		Peoples Film Collective
2020	Hindi	Eeb Allay Ooo	Sound Designer		Pingyao International Film Festival, China in 2019 Berlin International Film Festival, 2020 Mumbai Film Festival, 2020 (Golden Gateway Award) We Are One: A Global Film Festival
2019	Hindi	Gumnaam Din (Missing Days)	Sound Designer	Ekta Mittal Public Service Broadcasting Trust	Berlin International Film Festival 2020
		Jaadui Machchhi	Sound Designer	Mira Nair Ektara Collective	7th International Documentary and Short Film Festival of Kerala, 2014; BYOFF (Bring Your Own Film Festival), Puri; 18th International Children’s Film Festival, Hyderabad, 2014; 10th IAWRT Asian Women’s Festival, 2014; IFFON (International Film Festival of Nepal), Kathmandu, 2017
		Life After			
		That Cloud Never Left			
2019		Agar Wo Desh Banati/ If She Built A Country	Sound Designer, Mixer	Maheen Mirza PSBT	International Documentary and Short-film Festival of Kerala
		Aise Hee			
		Anandi Gopal			Pune International FIlm Festival
		At home, walking			Yamagath Documentary Festival
2018		Sona Dhwandi Bhed Te Suchha Pahad (The Gold-Laden Sheep and the Sacred Mountain)		Ridham Janve	Dharamshala International Film Festival, 2018; Asia Pacific Screen Awards, 2018; International Film Festival Rotterdam
		My name is salt			
		Vaishnav Jan Toh			
		Nazarband		Mr Mukhopadhyay	Busan International Film Festival
2018	Hindi	Absence		Ekta Mittal	Sheffield International Documentary Festival 2019; Busan International Film Festival 2018; Yamagata International Documentary Film Festival; 2019; Amsterdam International Documentary Film Festival; 2018
2017	Nepali	Ralang Road		Karma Takapa	Karlovy Vary Film Festival, 2017; Jio Mami Film Festival, 2017; Karlovy Vary International Film Festival
