= Shannon Amen =

2019 Canadian short film

- Film poster
- Directed by: Chris Dainty
- Written by: Chris Dainty
- Produced by: Maral Mohammadian
- Cinematography: Karim Ayari
- Edited by: Chris Dainty; Trevor Dixon-Bennett
- Music by: Shannon Jamieson; Lyndell Montgomery
- Production company: National Film Board of Canada
- Release date: September 25, 2019 (OIAF)
- Running time: 15 minutes
- Country: Canada

Shannon Amen is a Canadian animated short film, directed by Chris Dainty and released in 2019. Created as a tribute to his childhood friend and former creative partner Shannon Jamieson who committed suicide in 2006 after being unable to reconcile her Christian faith with her lesbian identity, the film blends traditional two-dimensional animation, done in Jamieson's style of painting, with Dainty's own technique of "icemation", which blends stop motion and puppetry to animate human figures and objects carved in ice.

The film premiered on September 26, 2019, at the Ottawa International Animation Festival. In 2020, the film was selected by the Annecy International Animation Film Festival to be featured in We Are One: A Global Film Festival.

The film received a Canadian Screen Award nomination for Best Animated Short at the 8th Canadian Screen Awards in 2020.
