= The Sholay Girl =

2019 Hindi drama film

- Official release poster
- Directed by: Aditya Sarpotdar
- Written by: Faizal Akhtar; Shrabani Deodhar; Sameer Siddiqui
- Produced by: Shrabani Deodhar; Sai Deodhar; Shakti Anand
- Starring: Bidita Bag; Chandan Roy Sanyal; Aditya Lakhia; Prince Rodde
- Production company: Purple Morning Movies
- Distributed by: ZEE5
- Release date: 8 March 2019
- Running time: 106 minutes
- Country: India
- Language: Hindi

The Sholay Girl is a 2019 Hindi-language biographical period drama film directed by Aditya Sarpotdar and produced by Shrabani Deodhar, Sai Deodhar and Shakti Anand. Written by Faizal Akhtar and Shrabani Deodhar, the film is based on India's first stuntwoman, Reshma Pathan. Bidita Bag portrays Pathan's role while Chandan Roy Sanyal, Prince Rodde and Aditya Lakhia appear in supporting roles.

The title refers to Sholay, in which Pathan worked as a stunt double for Hema Malini. To prepare for the role, Bag took training in martial arts. She also said that she watched the tonga scene from Sholay "at least a 100 times to master the role." The official trailer was released on 3 March 2019 and the film was released on 8 March, the International Women's Day on the online streaming platform ZEE5.

== Cast ==
- Bidita Bag as Reshma Pathan
  - Spandan Chaturvedi as young Reshma Pathan
- Dhrisha Kalyani as Reshma's younger sister
- Chandan Roy Sanyal as S. Azim
- Prince Rodde as Young Ramesh Sippy
- Vineet Raina as Shakoor
- Sujata Sehgal as Reshma's mother
- Aditya Lakhia as Reshma's father
- Saharsh Shukla as Saajid
- Reshma Pathan as herself- Special appearance

== Reception ==
Nandini Ramnath of Scroll.in called it "an undeniably uplifting biopic that pays tribute to Reshma’s daring and can-do spirit". But she felt that the film "softens the rough edges and underplays the exploitative conditions under which she often worked." Alcheesh Kushwaha of NDTV praised Bag's performance. He then wrote: "In the one hour 25-minute film, with the colloquy, trickle and resonance of Reshma, the whole story of adventurer and Himmatwali Stantwoman explains in the sequels." Arushi Jain of The Indian Express called the film a "compelling watch" and praised Bag's acting calling her "effortless in her spot on performance as Reshma."
