= Chris Dainty =

Canadian artist and animator

- Education: Algonquin College
- Occupations: artist, animator, ice sculptor
- Known for: Shannon Amen
- Spouse: Jennifer Dainty

Chris Dainty is a Canadian artist and animator from Ottawa, Ontario. He is most noted for his 2019 short film Shannon Amen, which was a Canadian Screen Award nominee for Best Animated Short at the 8th Canadian Screen Awards in 2020.

A graduate of the animation program at Algonquin College, he runs his own animation studio in partnership with his wife Jennifer Dainty, and has served on award juries for the Ottawa International Animation Festival. He has done animation work for the television series The Secret World of Benjamin Bear, Carl², Odd Squad and Dino Dana, and made the short film One Last Dream in 2015.

Shannon Amen was made through his own self-invented technique of "icemation", which uses stop motion animation of figures carved in ice. Dainty is also an ice sculptor, and has frequently competed in the annual ice sculpture competition at Ottawa's Winterlude festival.
