= Kalari Vikraman =

2004 Indian film by Deepak Mohan

- Mukesh and Vidya Balan in a still from Kalari Vikraman
- Directed by: Deepak Mohan
- Written by: Babu Janardhanan
- Produced by: Maruthi Ram
- Starring: Mukesh; Vidya Balan; Thilakan; Jagathy Sreekumar; Maniyanpilla Raju; Harisree Ashokan
- Cinematography: Vipin Mohan
- Music by: Mohan Sithara
- Country: India
- Language: Malayalam

Kalari Vikraman is an unreleased Indian Malayalam-language film directed by Deepak Mohan, starring Mukesh and Vidya Balan . This is one of the earlier films of Vidya Balan that was never released.

== Plot ==
Kunju lakshmi and her grandfather Moose lives in their old property and Moose does the living by treating snake bitten people. He never charges them and see it as a cause, so their life is also a struggle due to financial issues, but the people are always there to support them. Kadaikkinukkattu family aim for Moose's property but loses the court battle on the same. They hatch a plot against Moose and Kunju lakshmi with assistance from police as well. Now the people tries to bring a savior ( Kalari Vikraman ) to protect Moose, but he is serving a jail term. Will he able to fight for Kunju lakshmi and Moose form the climax.

== Cast ==
- Mukesh as Kalari Vikraman
- Vidya Balan as Kunju lakshmi
- Thilakan as Moose
- Jagathy Sreekumar
- Maniyanpilla Raju
- Harisree Ashokan
- Suresh Krishna
- Spadikam George
- Nandu
- Prajod
- Shalu Menon
- Bindu Panicker
- Sudha Nair
- Rani
- Praseela

== Production ==
The film is yet to have a theatrical release as the makers abandoned the project due to financial issues even though the film is almost complete. Vidya Balan's name was mentioned as Vidya Iyer in news & promotional materials.
