= Natkhat =

2020 Indian film by Shaan Vyas

- Natkhat
- Directed by: Shaan Vyas
- Written by: Annukampa Harsh; Shaan Vyas
- Produced by: Ronnie Screwvala; Vidya Balan
- Starring: Vidya Balan; Sanika Patel
- Cinematography: Sachin Pillai
- Edited by: Shweta Venkat Mathew
- Music by: Karan Gour
- Production company: RSVP Movies
- Release date: 2 June 2020 (We Are One)
- Running time: 33 minutes
- Country: India
- Language: Hindi

Natkhat (transl. The Brat) is a 2020 Indian short film directed by Shaan Vyas and written by Vyas and Annukampa Harsh. It stars Vidya Balan as a mother educating her young son about gender equality. It premiered on YouTube as part of the We Are One: A Global Film Festival.

The film will be opening film of the Indian Film Festival of Melbourne on 23 October. The 2020 festival is being hosted virtually between 23 and 30 October, due to the cloud of the COVID-19 pandemic.

== Cast ==
- Vidya Balan as Surekha, Sonu's mother
- Sanika Patel as Sonu
- Raj Arjun as Sonu's father
- Atul Tiwari as Sonu's grandfather
- Nivedita Baunthiyal
- Sparsh Shrivastav as Sonu's uncle
- Samarth Mahor as Bantu
- Aruraj patel as Bhusa
- Abhi Dubey as Suresh
- Vedant Tanwar as Dora

== Production ==
Natkhat was filmed in Harda, Madhya Pradesh, and the interior scenes were filmed in Mumbai. A majority of the cast members had no prior acting experience. Sanika Patel, a girl, was cast in the leading role of Sonu.

== Reception ==
Shubhra Gupta of The Indian Express labelled Natkhat a "valuable addition to the films which call out patriarchy, and how utterly damaging it can be." Jyoti Sharma Bawa of Hindustan Times credited Vyas for effectively portraying a world in which "women are shorn of agency and men get their power from displaying naked machismo"; she praised Vidya for bringing "simplicity and nuance" to her role and Patel for matching her vulnerability.
