= Monkey menace =

Monkey menace is a common term for a social and ecological phenomenon in India and Sri Lanka, it describes the growing presence of monkey populations in the rural and urban environments, and the frequent hostile encounters implicated by it. This situation is fueled by human encroachment of wildlife areas and the effects of global warming on the health of ecosystem on which such animals depend, which motivates a competition for food with humans, especially the raiding of farms. The monkey menace is parallel to similar conflicts with elephants and leopards.

== In philosophy ==
In his book The Climate of History in a Planetary Age, Dipesh Chakrabarty approaches the problem of monkey menace as a question of human relationship to nonhuman life and the restriction of political categories, perceived as unable to provide an integral account of the human proximity and conviviality to such beings. Chakrabarty aks if the concept of refugee should be extended to animals that came to increasingly inhabit cities while considered "unwelcomed".
