= The Gold-Laden Sheep and the Sacred Mountain =

- Film poster
- Nepali: Sona Dhwandi Bhed Te Suchha Pahad
- Directed by: Ridham Janve
- Written by: Ridham Janve, Akshay Singh
- Cinematography: Saurabh Monga
- Edited by: Kratika Adhikari
- Production company: Dark Matter Pictures NFDC
- Distributed by: Dark Matter Pictures
- Release date: 4 November 2018 (Dharamshala International Film Festival)
- Running time: 97 minutes
- Country: India
- Languages: Nepali, Hindi

The Gold-Laden Sheep and The Sacred Mountain (Nepali: Sona Dhwandi Bhed Te Suchha Pahad / सोना ढ्वांदी भेड ते सुच्चा पहाड़) is a Nepalese mystery drama film directed by Ridham Janve.

== Plot ==
Two shepherds living on top of an unknown mountain go searching for an aircraft that crash landed somewhere nearby even as different teams sent by the aircraft's team get lost on the mountain.

== Cast ==
- Lokendra Gurung
- Arjun Pant

== Production ==
=== Shooting ===
The film was shot for 21 days in high Himalaya using equipment powered by portable battery that was charged by solar energy.

=== Sound design ===
The film uses very minimal background score and Sound designer Bigyna Dahal used specific ambiance sounds from the location. Director Ridham Janve and Bigyna Dahal has spent 20 additional days in the remote mountains with a custom made solar power house for MixPre-10T to record these sounds.

== Release ==
The film was released in India on 4 November 2018 at Dharamshala International Film Festival and worldwide on 28 January 2019 at International Film Festival Rotterdam.

== Awards ==
2019 Asia Pacific Screen Awards - Nominated for Best Feature Film 2019 Mumbai Film Festival
