= Reshma Pathan =

Indian stuntwoman

- Born: India
- Other names: Sholay Girl
- Occupations: Actress; Stuntperson
- Employer: Movie Stunt Artists Association
- Notable work: Sholay (1975)
- Spouse: Shakoor Pathan

Reshma Pathan is an Indian actress and the first stuntwoman of the Indian film industry. She is also known as the Sholay Girl, as she played Hema Malini’s stunt double in Sholay. The film, The Sholay Girl, is a biopic about her life. She is also the first female to become a member of the Movie Stunt Artists Association. She has performed thousands of dangerous stunts in almost 400 films.

== Career ==
Reshma began working as a stunt double when she was 14 when the Fight Director S. Azim offered her to join the film industry. She began her career by playing Laxmi Chaya’s double in the film Ek Khiladi Bawan Pattey (1972). Reshma describes, "I started with 175 rupees per day. I got 100 rupees in hand. I was swindled of the transport money. But I was happy. I wouldn’t have been able to make this amount even if I was a graduate. Fulfilling the needs of my family was my priority" Reshma has played the stunt double for actresses like Waheeda Rehman, Rekha, Hema Malini, Sridevi, Dimple Kapadia, and Meenakshi Seshadri, among other Bollywood actress. She has also done stunts in many Bhojpuri and South Indian films and bilingual films like Gandhi, Mangal Pandey: The Rising and The Warriors. She was the stunt woman for almost all film actresses through the 1970s and 80s in Hindi film industry.

== Personal life ==
Reshma took to doing stunts in films in order to financially support her family. Fight Director S. Azim offered her to join the film industry. “I was a tomboy. Fight director S. Azim uncle had seen my antics in the area. Area ki behen banne ka bahut shauk tha. He suggested I do stunts,” she recalls. However, her father was against her performing stunts. He believed that the huge risk involved while performing a stunt could not be covered by any given amount of money. Eventually, she managed to convince her family.

In 1980s, she married stunt director Shakoor Pathan. She and her husband faced great financial challenges when a law banning stunts in films was passed in 1984. “One day I had no money for our next meal. I had the habit of leaving coins and rupees in nook and corners of the house. I frantically searched cups, boxes, containers… hoping to find some money. I found some 1600 rupees and cried with relief,” she recalls. She believes that stunt-masters have an uncertain future and ensured that her sister's sons (whom she raised) and her own complete their education and got stable jobs. “One is an engineer, the second a manager in a car company, while my son is a doctor.”

She has actively spoken out against the sexism in the Indian film industry. She received many indecent proposals from men in her career and retorted harshly. "If you remain quiet the first time someone misbehaves, they’re encouraged. I tactfully used my tongue, though I could have used my fists to defend myself," she told Filmfare.

== Awards ==
- Extraordinary Achievement Award at the Critics Choice Film Awards (CCFA)
