= We Are One: A Global Film Festival =

2020 online film festival

We Are One: A Global Film Festival is an international online film festival which took place in 2020. Organized by Tribeca Enterprises in conjunction with YouTube as a response to the cancellation of many traditional film festivals during the COVID-19 pandemic, the festival screened a selection of films for free on YouTube between May 29 and June 7.

The festival featured a mix of premieres of new films that had been slated to premiere at a film festival that was cancelled due to the pandemic, and older films which the partner festivals chose to highlight as deserving of wider attention, as well as a new film by Kōji Fukada that was created specifically for We Are One. In addition, the festival screened a number of virtual reality projects and some international television and web series episodes, selected panel discussions with filmmakers, and a live DJ set by Questlove.

Films were screened for free, although links were available to encourage voluntary donations to international COVID-19 relief funds.

== Partners ==
The event featured programming curated by various international partner festivals:

- Annecy International Animation Film Festival
- Berlin International Film Festival
- BFI London Film Festival
- Cannes Film Festival
- Guadalajara International Film Festival
- Macau International Movie Festival
- Rotterdam International Film Festival
- Jerusalem Film Festival
- Mumbai Film Festival
- Karlovy Vary International Film Festival
- Locarno Film Festival
- Marrakech International Film Festival
- New York Film Festival
- San Sebastian International Film Festival
- Sarajevo Film Festival
- Sundance Film Festival
- Sydney Film Festival
- Tokyo International Film Festival
- Toronto International Film Festival
- Tribeca Film Festival
- Venice Film Festival

== Films ==
=== Feature films ===
- 45 Days in Harvar — César Aréchiga
- Dinner for Adele — Oldřich Lipský
- Air Conditioner — Fradique
- Amreeka — Cherien Dabis
- Beautiful Things — Giorgio Ferrero
- Beyond the Mountain — David R. Romay
- Bridges of Sarajevo — Aida Begić, Leonardo Di Costanzo, Jean-Luc Godard, Kamen Kalev, Isild Le Besco, Sergei Loznitsa, Vincenzo Marra, Ursula Meier, Vladimir Perišić, Cristi Puiu, Marc Recha, Angela Schanelec, Teresa Villaverde
- A City Called Macau — Li Shaohong
- Copwatch — Camilla Hall
- Crazy World — Isaac Nabwana
- Dantza — Telmo Esnal
- Eeb Allay Ooo! — Prateek Vats
- Electric Swan — Konstantina Kotzamani
- The Epic of Everest — John Baptist Lucius Noel
- Grab — Billy Luther
- Ice Cream and the Sound of Raindrops — Daigo Matsui
- The Iron Hammer — Joan Chen
- Kmêdeus — Nuno Miranda
- Late Marriage — Dover Kosashvili
- Los Pasos Dobles — Isaki Lacuesta
- Love Chapter 2 — Sharon Eyal
- Mary Is Happy, Mary Is Happy — Nawapol Thamrongrattanarit
- Mugaritz Bso — Juantxo Sardón, Felipe Ugarte
- Mystery Road - Ivan Sen
- Nasir — Arun Karthick
- Ricky Powell: The Individualist — Josh Swade
- Rudeboy: The Story of Trojan Records — Nicolas Jack Davies
- SEE Factory Sarajevo mon amour — Dusan Kasalica, Neven Samardzic, Masa Sarovic, Urška Djukić, Eleonora Veninova, Sharon Engelhart, Teodora Ana Mihai, Gabriel Tzafka, Carolina Markowicz, Yona Rozenkier
- Shiraz: A Romance of India — Franz Osten
- Sisterhood — Tracy Choi
- Ticket of No Return — Ulrike Ottinger
- Tremble All You Want — Akiko Ohku
- Volubilis — Faouzi Bensaïdi
- Wake Up: Stories From the Frontlines of Suicide Prevention — Nate Townsend
- Wrath of Silence — Yukun Xin

=== Short films ===
- 24 Frames per Century — Athina Rachel Tsangari
- 32-RBIT — Victor Orozco Ramírez
- And Then the Bear — Agnès Patron
- Anna — Dekel Berenson
- Atlantiques — Mati Diop
- Awake — Atul Mongia
- A warm comedy about madness, depression and unfulfilled dreams — Michal Ďuriš
- The Battle of San Romano — Georges Schwizgebel
- Bilby — Liron Topaz, Pierre Perifel, JP Sans
- Bird Karma — William Salazar
- Black Barbie — Comfort Arthur
- Blood Rider — Jon Kasbe
- Bonifacio in Summertime — Pierre-Luc Granjon, Antoine Lanciaux
- The Brat — Shaan Vyas
- Butterflies — Yona Rozenkier
- The Cats — Alejandro Ríos
- Cerulia — Sofía Carrillo
- Circus Person — Britt Lower
- Cru — David Oesch
- Dew Line — Joanna Priestley
- Dirty Laundry — Maxim Bessmertny
- The Distance Between Us and the Sky — Vasilis Kekatos
- Dramatic Relationships — Dustin Guy Defa
- East of Jefferson — Koji Fukada
- Egg — Michael J. Goldberg
- Fainting Spells — Sky Hopinka
- Forever's Gonna Start Tonight — Eliza Hittman
- Genius Party: Happy Machine — Masaaki Yuasa
- A Hand in Two Ways (Fisted) — Dani and Sheilah ReStack
- Inabe — Koji Fukada
- Indefinite Pitch — James N. Kienitz Wilkins
- The Jump — Vanessa Dumont, Nicolas Davenel
- Leon in Wintertime — Pierre-Luc Granjon, Pascal Le Nôtre
- The Light Side — Ryan Ebner
- Live to Live — Laida Lertxundi
- Lonely Encounter — Jenny Wan
- Mad Ladders — Michael Robinson
- Marooned — Andrew Erekson
- Masterpiece — Runyararo Mapfumo
- Molly in Springtime — Pierre-Luc Granjon
- Monster God — Agustina San Martin
- Motorcycle Drive By — David Wexler
- Mud — Shaandiin Tome
- My Father's Tools — Heather Condo
- Natkhat — Shaan Vyas
- The Nap — Federico Luis Tachella
- No More Wings — Abraham Adeyemi
- No One Left Behind — Guillermo Arriaga
- Nutag-Homeland — Alisi Telengut
- Occidente — Ana Vaz
- The One-Minute Memoir — Joan C. Gratz
- Over — Jörn Threlfall
- Parsi — Eduardo Williams, Mariano Blatt
- Pelourinho: They Don't Really Care About Us — Akosua Adoma Owusu
- Poppety in the Fall — Pierre-Luc Granjon, Antoine Lanciaux
- The Procession (Le Cortège) — Pascal Blanchet, Rodolphe Saint-Gelais
- Rosalinda — Matías Piñeiro
- Route-3 — Thanasis Neofotistos
- Service of the Goods — Jean-Paul Kelly
- Shannon Amen — Chris Dainty
- Stories of Destroyed Cities: Şhengal — Şêro Hindê
- Toto — Marco Baldonado
- Tapi! — Jim Chuchu
- The Tear's Thing — Clémence Poésy
- Throat Singing in Kangirsuk — Eva Kaukai, Manon Chamberland
- Untitled (Letter to Serra) — Lisandro Alonso
- The Van — Erenik Beqiri
- Vertical Shapes in a Horizontal Landscape — Mark Jenkin
- Violettina — Alice Rohrwacher
- When I Write It — Nico Opper, Shannon St. Aubin
- White Echo — Chloë Sevigny
- Who Talks — Elin Övergaard
- The Yalta Conference Online — Koji Fukada

=== 360 VR ===
- Alteration — Jérôme Blanquet
- Bloodless — Gina Kim
- Crow: The Legend — Eric Darnell
- Daughters of Chibok — Joel Kachi Benson
- Extravaganza — Ethan Shaftel
- Ghost Fleet VR — Lucas Gath and Shannon Service
- Isle of the Dead — Benjamin Nuel
- Ivory Burn — Nicholas de Pencier, Jennifer Baichwal and Edward Burtynsky
- Minotaur — Munro Ferguson
- My Africa — David Allen
- On/Off — Isabelle Foucrier and Camille Duvelleroy
- Passenger — Isobel Knowles and Van Sowerwine
- Step to the Line — Ricardo Laganaro
- Traveling While Black — Roger Ross Williams
- The Waiting Room — Victoria Mapplebeck

=== Television ===
- And She Could Be Next — Grace Lee, Marjan Safinia
- Losing Alice — Sigal Avin
- Mabo — Rachel Perkins
- Na plovarne — Marek Eben

=== Web series ===
- Jaws: Assembling a Top-Tier Team — Michael Tucker, Tricia Aurand, Brian Bitner, Alex Calleros, Vince Major
- The Stories That Prepared Us — Jack Nugent, Andrew Fernandez
- Sébastien Tellier on Paris’ Rooftop: A Take Away Show — Élie Girard

=== Panels ===
- Sundance Film Festival: Cinema Cafe with Jackie Chan
- Sundance Film Festival: Cinema Cafe with Tessa Thompson and Jane Campion
- Guadalajara International Film Festival: Diego Luna, The Life After
- Rotterdam International Film Festival Freedom Lecture: Rojava Film Commune
- Marrakech International Film Festival: In conversation with Guillermo del Toro
- Locarno International Film Festival 2019 Excellence Award Conversation: Song Kang-ho and Bong Joon-ho
- Locarno International Film Festival 2019 Pardo d'onore to John Waters
- Jerusalem Film Festival Masterclass with Nadav Lapid
- Berlin International Film Festival On Transmission: Ang Lee in Conversation with Kore-eda Hirokazu
- Berlin International Film Festival On Transmission: Claire Denis in Conversation with Olivier Assayas
- Cannes Film Festival Rendez-vous with Alain Delon
- Cannes Film Festival Rendez-vous with Zhang Ziyi
- Toronto International Film Festival Talks: Tantoo Cardinal Master Class
- Toronto International Film Festival Talks: Viggo Mortensen and David Cronenberg on Crash
- Tribeca Film Festival Talks: Alejandro Iñárritu with Marina Abramović
- Tribeca Film Festival Talks: Francis Ford Coppola and Steven Soderbergh
