= Prabha Khaitan =

Prabha Khaitan (1 November 1942 – 20 September 2008) was an Indian novelist, poet, entrepreneur and feminist. She was the founding president of the Prabha Khaitan Foundation and was actively involved in women's affairs. Prabha Khaitan founded Figurette, a women's health care company, in 1966. In 1976 she started a leather export company. She was the only female president of the Calcutta Chamber of Commerce.

She won the "talented woman" award and Top Personality award for her contribution to the literature of the Kendriya Hindi Sansthan scholar Rahul Sankrityayan. Her autobiography is titled Anya se Ananya (A life apart).
