= Sherni (2021 film) =

2021 Indian film by Amit V. Masurkar

- Official release poster
- Directed by: Amit V. Masurkar
- Screenplay by: Aastha Tiku
- Story by: Aastha Tiku
- Produced by: Bhushan Kumar; Krishan Kumar; Vikram Malhotra; Amit V. Masurkar
- Starring: Vidya Balan
- Cinematography: Rakesh Haridas
- Edited by: Dipika Karla
- Music by: Benedict Taylor
- Production companies: T-Series; Abundantia Entertainment
- Distributed by: Amazon Prime Video
- Release date: 18 June 2021
- Running time: 130 minutes
- Country: India
- Language: Hindi

Sherni (/ʃeɪrni/ transl. Tigress) is a 2021 Indian Hindi-language thriller film directed by Amit V. Masurkar and produced by T-Series and Abundantia Entertainment. The film stars Vidya Balan in the leading role of an Indian Forest Service officer, alongside Sharat Saxena, Vijay Raaz, Ila Arun, Brijendra Kala, Neeraj Kabi and Mukul Chaddha in supporting roles. The film premiered on Amazon Prime Video on 18 June 2021.

The film deals with human–wildlife conflict and wildlife conservation. The title of the film is a bit of a misnomer, as in Hindi sherni properly refers to a lioness, while the formal word for a tigress is baghin, although the Oxford Hindi-English dictionary by R. S. McGregor considers both meanings accurate. Sherni received positive reviews from the film critics for raising awareness about the importance of wildlife conservation and Balan's performance.

== Plot ==
A forest officer (Vidya) is tasked with capturing and containing a man-eating tigress in a remote village. However, she faces hostility from various sides as she tries to do her job. The MLA makes it a political issue and hires a hunter to kill the tigress so that he can use it in the next election. Vidya wants to capture the tigress instead. She and her team track the tigress pugmarks. The hunter manages to kill the tigress but can't find the cubs. The villagers find the cubs hiding under a wooden log and secretly inform Vidya. The cubs are saved.

== Cast ==
- Vidya Balan as DFO Vidya Vincent, IFS
- Sharat Saxena as Ranjan Rajhans aka Pintu
- Vijay Raaz as Hassan Noorani
- Ila Arun as Pawan's mother
- Brijendra Kala as Bansal
- Neeraj Kabi as Nangia
- Mukul Chadda as Pawan
- Amar Singh Parihar as MLA G K Singh
- Satyakam Anand as P K Singh
- Anoop Trivedi as Pyare Lal
- Gopal Datt as Saiprasad
- Suma Mukundan as Vidya's mother
- Nadim Husain as Forest Guard/Shooter
- Nidhi Diwan as Reshma
- Sampa Mandal as Jyoti
- Lokesh Mittal as ACM Mohan

== Music ==
The film's music was composed by Bandish Projekt and Utkarsh Dhotekar while lyrics written by Hussain Haidry and Raghav.

The song "Main Sherni" was salutes and applauds the courage of women, who have stood their ground, beaten the odds and have carved their niche by not conforming to the traditional. It stars Mira Erda (F4 Racer and Driver Coach), Natasha Noel (Body positivity influencer and Yoga trainer), Eshna Kutty (a social media influencer and hula-hoop dancer) and Trinetra Haldar (one of the first transgender doctors in Karnataka), Jayshree Mane (a frontline warrior [COVID-19 healthcare worker] at B.Y.L Nair Hospital), Riddhi Arya (a student who delivers food to frontline warriors), Anita Devi (security guard), Seema Duggal (teacher), Archana Jadav (house-help) along with Vidya Balan.

No.	Title	Lyrics	Music	Singers	Length
1.	"Main Sherni"	Raghav	Utkarsh Dhotekar	Akasa Singh; Rap by: Raftaar	3:28
2.	"Bandar Baant"	Hussain Haidry	Bandish Projekt	Aishwarya Joshi, Roshan Khan	3:16

== Production ==
The principal photography commenced on 3 March 2020 in Madhya Pradesh. The film was shot extensively in Bhoot Palasi in Delwadi forests, in Raisen district, Kanha National Park, besides forests in Balaghat district in the state. After taking a break due to the COVID-19 lockdown, the shooting resumed in October 2020.

== Release ==
The film premiered on Amazon Prime Video on 18 June 2021.

== Reception ==
The film received positive reviews from the film critics, who praised Balan's performance and praised the film for raising awareness about the importance of wildlife conservation. On the review aggregator website Rotten Tomatoes, the film holds a rating of 100% based on 14 reviews and an average rating of 7.1/10.

Anna M. M. Vetticad of Firstpost gave Sherni a rating of 4/5 and wrote, "The environmental thriller is not a frequently visited genre in Bollywood, but Sherni forays into that territory and delivers unrelenting yet noiseless excitement in addition to food for thought all the way up to its concluding minutes". Stutee Ghosh from The Quint gave Sherni a rating of 4.5/5 and stated, "Nothing is formulaic in Sherni. A woman pitchforked into unfamiliar territory, condescendingly referred to as "lady officer" doesn't respond with a diatribe against patriarchy". Praising the writing of the film and performances she further stated, "The writing and performances both are layered and profound; So much is conveyed just through silences, sometimes a strategically placed pause". Sreeparna Sengupta from The Times of India gave Sherni a rating of 4/5. Calling it an intense and intriguing film she wrote, "Sherni leaves a solid impact without roaring too loud". Praising Balan's performance she further wrote, "Vidya Balan gives us a remarkable, understated yet powerful performance, as she exudes the quiet determination, passion and grit of her character". Sukanya Verma from Rediff gave Sherni a rating of 4/5 and wrote, "Sherni is a triumph -- a sublime outcome of purpose and storytelling falling in place".

Saibal Chatterjee from NDTV gave the film a rating of 3.5/5 and wrote, "Sherni isn't just a tigress-on-the-loose adventure; It is a film of our times for the ages, a worthy follow-up to Newton". He praised the performances of Balan and the supporting actors by stating that they bring a high level of authenticity. He further wrote, "The many strands of Sherni make it the film it is. It touches upon the lopsided nature of development, the rights of forest dwellers, the dangers of a depleting forest cover, and the lust of politicians for power and pelf even as the world around threatens to come unstuck". Anupama Chopra of Film Companion criticized the film for its inert screenplay and underwhelming storytelling but praised Balan's performance by stating, "The film is grounded by the gravitas and understated strength that Vidya Balan brings to Vidya Vincent; The actor lets go of her natural exuberance and works with restrained expressions; She is controlled and terrific". Phuong Le from The Guardian gave the film a rating of 3/5 and wrote, "Balan excels as a resolute forest officer battling sexism and corruption, as well as nature, in the latest satirical thriller from Newton director Amit V Masurkar". Bollywood Hungama gave Sherni a rating of 2/5 and wrote, "Sherni begins on a dry note and ends on an unjustified and drab note. On the whole, Sherni rests on an interesting storyline and Vidya Balan's performance but the slow and documentary-style narrative, longer runtime and bewildering climax ruins the impact".

Roktim Rajpal from the Deccan Herald gave Sherni a rating of 2.5/5 and wrote, "Sherni is a sincere and thought-provoking drama that caters to those fond of realistic cinema". Criticizing the storyline and writing of the film he wrote, "The storyline does not quite reach its potential as the writing is not as good as could have been. The sequences which try to highlight the impact of the human-wildlife conflict on the 'aam aadmi' fails to make an impact as they are rushed and the subplots such as the challenges faced by women and the political rivalry haven't really been explored too well". He praised Balan's performance by stating, "Vidya is the heart and soul of Sherni and she leaves an impact with her restrained performance" but criticized the film for underutilizing its supporting characters. Umesh Punwani from Koimoi gave Sherni a rating of 2.5/5 and wrote, "Sherni has a lot of things to like, but we've seen them perfected in an already superior product created by the same director. It's neither a disappointment nor lives up to the hope one could possess after knowing the film's cast & crew". Calling Balan's performance "average" he further wrote, "A bittersweet thing about being a great actor is that your average performances sharply pop up, becoming vividly evident after delivering groundbreaking roles". Sushri Sahu of Mashable gave Sherni a rating of 3/5 and called it an "underwhelming film". She criticized the film for its "unflashy" screenplay but praised Balan's performance by stating, "Balan's stoic and subtle act keeps this satirical jungle drama afloat; She is shouldering the film on her talent and acting prowess".

== Accolades ==
Award	Date of the ceremony	Category	Recipients	Result	Ref.
Indian Film Festival of Melbourne	20 August 2021	Best Actress	Vidya Balan	Won	
FOI Online Awards	23 January 2022	Best Feature Film	Sherni	Nominated	
FOI Online Awards	23 January 2022	Best Actress in a Leading Role	Vidya Balan	Nominated	
FOI Online Awards	23 January 2022	Best Dialogues	Yashasvi Mishra & Amit V. Masurkar	Nominated	
FOI Online Awards	23 January 2022	Best Performance by an Ensemble Cast	Cast of Sherni	Nominated	
FOI Online Awards	23 January 2022	Best Film Editing	Dipika Kalra	Won	
FOI Online Awards	23 January 2022	Best Production Design	Devika Dave	Nominated	
FOI Online Awards	23 January 2022	Best Sound Design and Mixing	Anish John, Bibin Dev & Ramesh Birajdar	Nominated	
67th Filmfare Awards	30 August 2022	Best Actress	Vidya Balan	Nominated	
67th Filmfare Awards	30 August 2022	Best Film (Critics')	Amit V. Masurkar	Nominated	
67th Filmfare Awards	30 August 2022	Best Actress (Critics')	Vidya Balan	Won	
67th Filmfare Awards	30 August 2022	Best Screenplay	Aastha Tikoo	Nominated	
67th Filmfare Awards	30 August 2022	Best Dialogue	Amit Masurkar and Yashasvi Mishra	Nominated	
67th Filmfare Awards	30 August 2022	Best Cinematography	Rakesh Haridas	Nominated	
67th Filmfare Awards	30 August 2022	Best Production Design	Devika Dave	Nominated	
67th Filmfare Awards	30 August 2022	Best Sound Design	Anish John	Nominated	
67th Filmfare Awards	30 August 2022	Best Editing	Dipika Kalra	Nominated	

== See also ==
- Tiger attack
- Tiger attacks in the Sundarbans
- Champawat Tiger
- Thak man-eater
