= Mission Mangal =

2019 Indian film by Jagan Shakti

- Theatrical release poster
- Directed by: Jagan Shakti
- Written by: R. Balki; Jagan Shakti; Nidhi Singh Dharma; Saketh Kondiparthi
- Story by: Jagan Shakti
- Produced by: Aruna Bhatia; Anil Naidu
- Starring: Akshay Kumar; Vidya Balan; Sonakshi Sinha; Taapsee Pannu; Nithya Menen; Kirti Kulhari; Sharman Joshi
- Cinematography: Ravi Varman
- Edited by: Chandan Arora
- Music by: Score: Amit Trivedi; Songs: Amit Trivedi; Tanishk Bagchi
- Production companies: Fox Star Studios; Cape of Good Films; Hope Productions
- Distributed by: Fox Star Studios
- Release date: 15 August 2019
- Running time: 127 minutes
- Country: India
- Language: Hindi
- Budget: ₹40 crore
- Box office: ₹290.59 crore

Mission Mangal (transl. Mission Mars) is a 2019 Indian drama film directed by Jagan Shakti and produced by Fox Star Studios, Cape of Good Films, Hope Productions, Aruna Bhatia and Anil Naidu. Loosely based on the life of scientists at the ISRO who contributed to India's first interplanetary expedition Mars Orbiter Mission, it cast of Akshay Kumar, Vidya Balan, Sonakshi Sinha, Taapsee Pannu, Nithya Menen (in her Hindi debut), Kirti Kulhari, Sharman Joshi in lead roles alongside H. G. Dattatreya, Vikram Gokhale, Dalip Tahil, Sanjay Kapoor and Mohammed Zeeshan Ayyub amongst others in supporting roles.

Shakti, an associate director on Kumar's 2018 film Pad Man, pitched the script to him, and principal photography commenced in November 2018.

Mission Mangal was theatrically released on 15 August 2019, India's Independence Day. It received positive reviews from critics and earned ₹291.59 crore worldwide, becoming a major commercial success. At the 65th Filmfare Awards, Mission Mangal received 6 nominations, including Best Film, Best Director (Shakti) and Best Actress (Balan).

== Plot ==
Across the landscapes of Bengaluru, India, at ISRO, after the failed launch of GSLV-F06 on 25 December 2010, due to a miscalculation by Project Director Tara Shinde (Vidya Balan), Rakesh Dhawan (Note: An obvious allusion to Satish Dhawan) (Akshay Kumar), a fellow scientist working with her, takes the blame for the mistake. As a result, he is relocated to work on Mars Orbiter Mission (Mars-craft) as punishment, where Tara joins him out of guilt. The new GSLV missions are given to Rupert Desai (Dalip Tahil), an ex-NASA scientist of Indian origin. The Mars Orbiter Mission (MOM) is thought of as an impossible mission by his coworkers due to its aim of reaching Mars with its tight budget.

Rakesh learns that the MOM cannot take off on the PSLV since the available technology has a payload of only 1500 kg and not enough fuel to fire the rocket to be carried to a distance of almost 55 million Kilometres. GSLV, if it had succeeded, could have taken the satellite to Mars as it had a payload of 2300 kg. However, recent significant failures of GSLV have jeopardised the planned future missions.

Tara is also caught up at home between constant feuds between her husband Sunil and her son Dilip, the latter showing an interest in his namesake A. R. Rahman and Islam. Dilip has another interest in the Mars Mission. One day, when Tara has to make puris and runs out of gas, she plans to cook the rest with the flame off. This sparks an idea on using minimal fuel on the PSLV vehicle, to reach Mars. With reluctance, opposing Rupert assigns a junior team to Rakesh and Tara.

The junior scientists' team comprises: Eka Gandhi (Sonakshi Sinha), a propulsion control expert, who is looking for any chance to get away to NASA; Neha Siddiqui (Kirti Kulhari), a spacecraft autonomy designer, who is struggling with rejection as a result of her intercommunal background despite her divorce while trying hard to find a house; Kritika Aggarwal (Taapsee Pannu), a navigation expert who is also a devoted wife to her army husband Rishi (Mohammed Zeeshan Ayyub), while trying hard to get a driving license; Varsha Pillai (Nithya Menen), the satellite designer and payload expert, who faces her mother-in-law's taunts for being unable to conceive a child; Parmeshwar Joshi (Sharman Joshi), the payload expert, who relies more on the religious priest and his advice but subsequently develops a romantic interest in Eka; and Ananth Iyengar (H. G. Dattatreya), the team's structural engineer, who is trying to complete his pilgrimage to Venkateswara Temple, Tirumala with his wife.

After the announcement of India's second Moon mission, Chandrayaan-2, the mission's budget is cut by 50%; in between the tight schedule and minuscule budget, Tara and Rakesh continue to work on their MOM project by making several compromises, even as Kritika abruptly abandons her duties without informing the duo upon learning that Rishi has been severely wounded in action. Tara and Rakesh realise that the rest of the junior scientists working on the project have low morale and motivation to make this mission happen, leading to the team slowing down. Tara soon realises that in order to meet their budget and schedule, she must make the team members change their attitudes, and motivate them to make their dream jobs into a reality. An attempt on her part to pacify her worried husband, Sunil by tracing their daughter Anya, who hasn't arrived home yet, to a Nightclub, eventually culminates in Sunil warming up to the party environment as he throws a comment about nostalgia. This strikes an idea in Tara's head, and the next day, she successfully motivates the team members by reminding them of their childhood passion for science, and they put all their hardwork and energy into resolving the issues with the mission to make it happen. Meanwhile, even as Kritika returns on being reminded by Rishi that she has a duty towards her country too, just like him, Varsha happens to be pregnant and soon delivers a child, for whom the team makes arrangements at the office itself, while Neha is warmly taken in by Ananth and his wife into their house (where Ananth helps her move on with her troubled past as a wife).

The MOM satellite is finally launched on PSLV on 5 November 2013 (after an 8-day delay due to weather), and is named Mangalyaan (Sanskrit: Mars-Craft) and is successfully inserted into Earth's orbit. Rakesh and his team celebrate the successful launch. However, while doing the sixth orbit-raising manoeuvre, the jets fail to launch, pushing the mission six days behind. Rupert mocks the team, while Tara continues to keep hope that something will happen. A couple months later, on the way to Mars, the satellite is hit by a solar radiation wave, which heavily damages its communication systems. When the team manages to regain communications, they realise that the solar radiation had increased the speed of the satellite and pushed it further, making up the six day gap they had incurred while doing the orbital manoeuvres with Earth. After spending a 298-day transit to Mars, MOM satellite is inserted into Mars orbit on 24 September 2014, making India the 4th country in the world to do so and the first country to do it in the first attempt.

== Cast ==
- Akshay Kumar as Rakesh Dhawan — scientist and mission director (based on the role of Mylswamy Annadurai in Mars Orbiter Mission)
- Vidya Balan as Tara Shinde — scientist and project director
- Sonakshi Sinha as Eka Gandhi — propulsion control expert
- Taapsee Pannu as Kritika Aggarwal — navigation expert
- Nithya Menen as Varsha Pillai — satellite engineer
- Kirti Kulhari as Neha Siddiqui — spacecraft autonomy designer
- Sharman Joshi as Parmeshwar Joshi — payload expert
- H. G. Dattatreya as Ananth Iyengar — structural engineer
- Vikram Gokhale as Shrikant Bhosle — director of ISRO and A. P. J. Abdul Kalam's old friend
- Dalip Tahil as Rupert Desai — former NASA scientist
- Sanjay Kapoor as Sunil Shinde — Tara's husband
- Mohammed Zeeshan Ayyub as Rishi Aggarwal — Kritika's husband and Soldier
- Amitt K. Singh as Farook Siddiqui — Neha's estranged husband
- Purab Kohli as Vivek Pillai — Varsha's husband
- Mohan Kapoor as Durgesh Swami — Journalist
- Arjan Kapoor as Sanjay Kumar — reporter
- Rohan Joshi as Dilip Shinde — Tara and Sunil's son (not AIB-fame)
- Anirban Bhattacharyya as Abhishek Sangha — TV presenter
- Kashmira Pardeshi as Anya Shinde — Tara and Sunil's daughter
- Prathamesh Mehta as Dhanraj Shinde — Sunil's father and Tara's father-in-law
- Manish Borundia as Kaushal Saini — ISRO employee
- Narendra Modi (as Prime Minister of India) in a special appearance using archive footage

== Production ==
On 5 November 2018, to coincide with 5 November 2013, the day the Mars Orbiter Mission was launched, Mission Mangal was announced. Principal photography for the film began later in mid-November. In early February, Pannu finished her schedule of shooting. Shakti initially had Mohanlal and Sridevi in mind for the roles played by Akshay Kumar and Vidya Balan. Shakti pitched the idea to Kumar while working as an associate director to R. Balki in Kumar's Pad Man.

In November 2018, a copyright infringement lawsuit was filed against the makers of the film by the filmmaker Radha Bharadwaj.

== Soundtrack ==
Mission Mangal

Soundtrack album by Amit Trivedi and Tanishk Bagchi
- Released: 15 August 2019
- Recorded: 2018–2019
- Studio: A T Studios
- Genre: Feature film soundtrack
- Length: 10:32
- Language: Hindi
- Label: Zee Music Company
- Producer: Amit Trivedi
External audio
- Audio Jukebox on YouTube

The music of the film is composed by Amit Trivedi while the lyrics are penned by Amitabh Bhattacharya.

Tanishk Bagchi was roped in as a guest composer and wrote and composed a promotional song, "Tota Udd".

Track listing
| No. | Title | Singer(s) | Length |
|---|---|---|---|
| 1. | "Dil Mein Mars Hai" | Benny Dayal, Vibha Saraf | 3:05 |
| 2. | "Shaabaashiyaan" | Shilpa Rao, Anand Bhaskar, Abhijeet Srivastava | 4:40 |
| 3. | "Tota Udd" (Music and Lyrics: Tanishk Bagchi) | Raja Hasan, Romi | 2:47 |
| Total length: | | | 10:32 |

== Release ==
The film was released in India on 15 August 2019 on the occasion of Indian Independence Day.

The film was digitally released on Disney+ Hotstar on 10 October 2019.

== Reception ==
=== Critical response ===
Mission Mangal received generally positive reviews from critics. Rajeev Masand of News 18 gave the film 3.5 out of 5 stars and said, "Ultimately, Mission Mangal is enjoyable and entertaining. Even the jingoism doesn’t feel entirely out of place. Director Jagan Shakti delivers a space movie that lifts off and frequently soars." Raja Sen of Hindustan Times gave the film only 2 out of 5 stars and said, "The facts are stupendous, but director Jagan Shakti decides to go fast and fictional, creating an underdog story that — while often likeable — plays out like a fable."

=== Box office ===
On its first day of release, Mission Mangal earned ₹29.16 crore nett in India to become the third highest-opening for a Bollywood film in 2019, and Kumar's highest opening ever. It recorded collections of ₹16.75-17 crore on the second day, outperforming in the regions of Mumbai, Mysore and Kolkata. On its third day of release, a Saturday, the film collected ₹23.5 crore nett. It earned ₹27.5 crore nett on Sunday, marking the highest earning for a Bollywood film in 2019 on a single day. The following day, it showed a drop of 50 percent from Friday's earnings to collect ₹8.5-8.75 crore nett.

As of 12 October 2019, with a gross of ₹238.80 crore in India and ₹51.79 crore overseas, the film had earned ₹290.59 crore worldwide and was the 8th highest grossing Bollywood movie of 2019.
