= Shakuntala Devi (film) =

2020 Indian film by Anu Menon

- Poster
- Directed by: Anu Menon
- Screenplay by: Anu Menon; Nayanika Mahtani; Ishita Moitra (Dialogues)
- Based on: Shakuntala Devi
- Produced by: Vikram Malhotra
- Starring: Vidya Balan; Jisshu Sengupta; Sanya Malhotra; Amit Sadh
- Cinematography: Keiko Nakahara
- Edited by: Antara Lahiri
- Music by: Songs: Sachin–Jigar; Score: Karan Kulkarni
- Production companies: Abundantia Entertainment; Sony Pictures Networks Productions; Genius Films
- Distributed by: Amazon Prime Video
- Release date: 31 July 2020
- Running time: 127 minutes
- Country: India
- Language: Hindi

Shakuntala Devi is a 2020 Indian Hindi-language biographical drama film tracing the life of mathematician and mental calculator Shakuntala Devi who was also known as the "human computer". The film is written and directed by Anu Menon and produced by Sony Pictures Networks India, Abundantia Entertainment and Genius Films, and stars Vidya Balan in the titular role, and Sanya Malhotra, Amit Sadh and Jisshu Sengupta in supporting roles, while child artist Spandan Chaturvedi in her film debut gives a cameo appearance as young Shakuntala.

Principal photography took place from September 2019 to November 2019. Originally planned for cinema release in May 2020, it was delayed owing to COVID-19 pandemic in India. Later, the film was directly streamed on Amazon Prime Video online on 31 July 2020 coinciding with Eid-al-Adha. Vidya Balan was also nominated for the 2021 Filmfare Award for Best Actress.

== Plot ==
In 2001, Anupama Banerjee arrives in London, England with her husband, Ajay Abhay Kumar, and reveals that she is filing a criminal case against her mother, Shakuntala Devi.

The film moves to Shakuntala Devi's childhood in Bangalore in the 1930s where her family discovers her incredible talent for quickly solving complex mathematical problems in her head. Her father decides to use Shakuntala's talent and have her do "math shows," where she would entertain people with her problem solving prowess. Shakuntala continues to do math shows and earn for the family as she grows up, but blames her father for not letting her live a normal childhood. She also blames her mother for not standing up to him, especially in the wake of her disabled sister's death, which could've been prevented with proper treatment. In 1954, she leaves for London after a violent altercation with her boyfriend, Dhiraj, after she learns that he had been pretending to love her even though he had a marriage fixed and even the invites printed out.

In London, Shakuntala lives with Tarabai in her home with three other Indian men but struggles to find opportunities for her shows. However, she eventually manages to impress Javier, a Spanish mathematician, when she shows off her skills at the Royal Mathematical Society in London. He helps improve Shakuntala's English and helps her get shows, and the pair begin a relationship as well. Shakuntala's popularity rapidly grows, and is given the nickname "The Human Computer" after she proves a computer wrong on a TV show. She expands her global influence by performing in other countries, and becomes a worldwide celebrity. Amidst all of this, Javier ends his relationship with Shakuntala, stating that he needs to return to Spain.

In 1968, Shakuntala meets Paritosh Banerjee in Mumbai, and the two quickly fall in love. The couple eventually get married and settle in Kolkata, with the aspirations of starting a family. In 1970, Shakuntala gives birth to Anupama, also known Anu, and devotes her life to being a mother. However, she realises how much she misses doing shows and decides to resume her career, leaving Anu with Paritosh. Shakuntala continues to amaze people, and even makes it into The Guinness Book of Records, but she worries about being an uncaring mother. Much to Paritosh's dismay, Shakuntala ultimately decides to take Anu with her on her travels and they soon divorce.

While growing up, Anu travels around the world with her mother. As Shakuntala is constantly exploring new career avenues, Anu finds herself constantly ignored and disenchanted with her life. Even after enrolling Anu in a college, Shakuntala uses every opportunity she can to have Anu accompany her. This reaches a breaking point when a teenage Anu lashes out at her mother for building her career at the expense of her childhood. In response, Shakuntala takes a break and settles with Anu in London, even supporting her business aspirations. This helps the mother and daughter become close. However, their relationship sours again when an adult Anu decides to marry Ajay, a businessman. Shakuntala informs Ajay of her expectation of him moving with them to London, despite him being settled in Bangalore. Anu accuses her mother of constantly holding her back and not letting her live her own life. Shakuntala, unwilling to let her daughter go, threatens to shut down Anu's business. Anu cuts off all contact with Shakuntala, and marries Ajay. She decides to not have children, fearing that she would not be a good mother. Despite this, Anu gives birth to a daughter, Amritha.

Anu and Ajay receive a shock when they are informed that Shakuntala used her power of attorney to sell Anu's business properties, while giving her zero percent of the profit share. Furthermore, she passed the payment of the capital gains tax on to Anu, leaving her family in massive debt. Anu and Ajay decide to take legal action against Shakuntala, and travel to London for the proceedings. Upon their arrival, they discover that Shakuntala's actions were a stunt, done so she could force her daughter to come see her. Shakuntala gives Anu the profit received from the sale of her properties, and asks for her forgiveness. Anu forgives her mother, and the two have an emotional reunion. Later, when Shakuntala wins an award in India, Anu, Ajay and Amritha attend it. Shakuntala also does a mini math show during the ceremony. Anu states that she is proud of her mother once again.

== Cast ==
- Vidya Balan as Shakuntala Devi; Paritosh's former wife, Anupama's mother, Ajay's mother-in-law and Amrita's grandmother
  - Spandan Chaturvedi as teenage Shakuntala
  - Araina Nand as child Shakuntala
- Jisshu Sengupta as Paritosh Banerjee; Shakuntala's former husband, Anupama's father, Ajay's father-in-law and Amritha's grandfather
- Sanya Malhotra as Anupama Bannerji (a.k.a. "Anu"); Shakuntala and Paritosh's daughter, Ajay's wife and Amritha's mother.
  - Chahat Tewani as Anu (teenage)
- Amit Sadh as Ajay Abhay Kumar; Anupama's husband, Shakuntala and Paritosh's son-in-law and Amritha's father
- Prakash Belawadi as Bishaw Mitra Mani: Shakuntala's father
- Nisha Aaliya as Bookshop Interviewer
- Sheeba Chaddha as Tarabai Banarsi, Shakuntala's landlady in London
- Vidyuth Gargi as Mohan Manhas, a TV game show host
- Ipshita Chakraborty Singh as Mrs. Devi, Shakuntala's mother
- Jiya Shah as Sharada Devi, Shakuntala's sister
- Renuka Sharma as Mrs. Kumar, Ajay's mother
- Neil Bhoopalam as Dheeraj Rajan, Shakuntala's former boyfriend
- Luca Calvani as Javier Lewis, Shakuntala's Spanish boyfriend based in London.
- Lan Bailey as Mediator
- Ahan Nirbhan as Srinivas
- Adi Chugh as Kartar
- Philip Roy as Shakuntala's lawyer
- Jack Francis as Anupama's lawyer
- Santosh Banerjee as Gordhanbhai

== Release ==
Due to the COVID-19 pandemic, the film was not released theatrically and streamed on Amazon Prime Video worldwide on 31 July 2020. Vidya Balan expressed her delight on social media platforms regarding the release of the film on over-the-top media services.

== Soundtrack ==
Shakuntala Devi

Soundtrack album by Sachin–Jigar
- Released: 21 July 2020
- Recorded: 2019
- Genre: Feature film soundtrack
- Length: 11:35
- Language: Hindi
- Label: Zee Music Company

Sachin–Jigar chronology
| Angrezi Medium (2020) | Shakuntala Devi (2020) | Roohi (2021) |
External audio
- Official Audio Jukebox on YouTube

The film's music was composed by Sachin–Jigar, and the lyrics were written by Vayu and Priya Saraiya.

Track listing
| No. | Title | Lyrics | Singer(s) | Length |
|---|---|---|---|---|
| 1. | "Pass Nahi Toh Fail Nahi" | Vayu Shrivastav | Sunidhi Chauhan | 2:31 |
| 2. | "Rani Hindustani" | Vayu Shrivastav | Sunidhi Chauhan | 2:24 |
| 3. | "Paheli" | Priya Saraiya | Shreya Ghoshal | 3:21 |
| 4. | "Jhilmil Piya" | Priya Saraiya | Benny Dayal, Monali Thakur | 3:19 |
| Total length: | | | | 11:35 |

== Critical reception ==
On the review aggregator website Rotten Tomatoes, 73% of 11 critics' reviews are positive, with an average rating of 6/10.

Sreeparna Sengupta of Times of India gave the film three and half stars out of five and said, "A joy to watch simply to soak in the fascinating life and times of the maths whiz – a human computer faster than an actual computer, the free-spirit, who was all that and so much more!" Shubhra Gupta of The Indian Express rated it three out of five stars, calling it "a Vidya Balan show".

Saibal Chatterjee of NDTV opined "the numbers add up nicely with a feisty Vidya Balan", giving the movie three out of five stars. Mike McCahill of The Guardian gave it three stars out of five and said, "The movie finds funny ways of dramatising the process whereby one generation of women squares its frustrations with another – but it adds up to spirited, intelligent, authentically feminist entertainment."
