= Bhalo Theko =

2003 Indian Bengali film

- Directed by: Goutam Halder
- Based on: Janmadin by Leena Gangopadhay
- Starring: Soumitra Chatterjee; Vidya Balan; Joy Sengupta
- Cinematography: Abhik Mukhopadhyay
- Music by: Prabuddha Banerjee
- Distributed by: Angel Video
- Release date: 25 December 2003
- Country: India
- Language: Bengali

Bhalo Theko (Bengali: ভাল থেকো; transl. Take Care) is a 2003 Indian Bengali movie based on Leena Gangopadhaya's story Janmadin released in 2003. Directed by Goutam Halder, it featured Soumitra Chatterjee, Joy Sengupta, Debshankar Halder, Parambrata Chatterjee and Vidya Balan. This movie marks Vidya Balan's cinematic debut. At the 51st National Film Awards, the film was awarded for Best Cinematography, Best Audiography and Special Jury Award for films producer and director.

== Plot ==
The film is set in Acharya Jagadish Chandra Bose's home in Falta, West Bengal, masquerading as Uttarpara. It deals with the story of a girl Anandi and her family (including uncle, brother, parents and sister), lover (brother's friend Babua) and few neighbours. Nature, tradition and love are Anandi's pillars of support in difficult times. Her brother will slowly drift away with companies of Naxalites, will not return home one day, and will be lost forever. Her parents will die heartbroken and her sister will get married suddenly and will leave the family. Babua will go abroad and marry somebody else.

It is implied that Anandi is forgetful of her sorrows that she was deceived by Babua (Joy Sengupta) whom she loved most. Babua comes back from abroad only to say: 'Anandi, I came back to set you free.'

Bhalo Theko has a non-linear pace with frequent jumps between current time and past. Film critics described Anandi as a large canvas painted in several hues. She stands against rootless internalisation and perplexed culture. A poem by a renowned Bangladeshi author and scholar Humayun Azad named "Shuvescha" was recited in the ending of the film by Anandi while wandering lonely in their garden.

== Cast ==
- Vidya Balan as Anandi
- Soumitra Chatterjee as Anandi's uncle
- Joy Sengupta as Babua Shine
- Debshankar Haldar
- Parambrata Chatterjee
- Rimjhim Gupta
- Souvik Poyra
- Anusua Majumdar
- Bijay Lakshmi Barman
- Chandan Sengupta
