= Shakuntala Devi =

Indian writer and mental calculator (1929–2013)

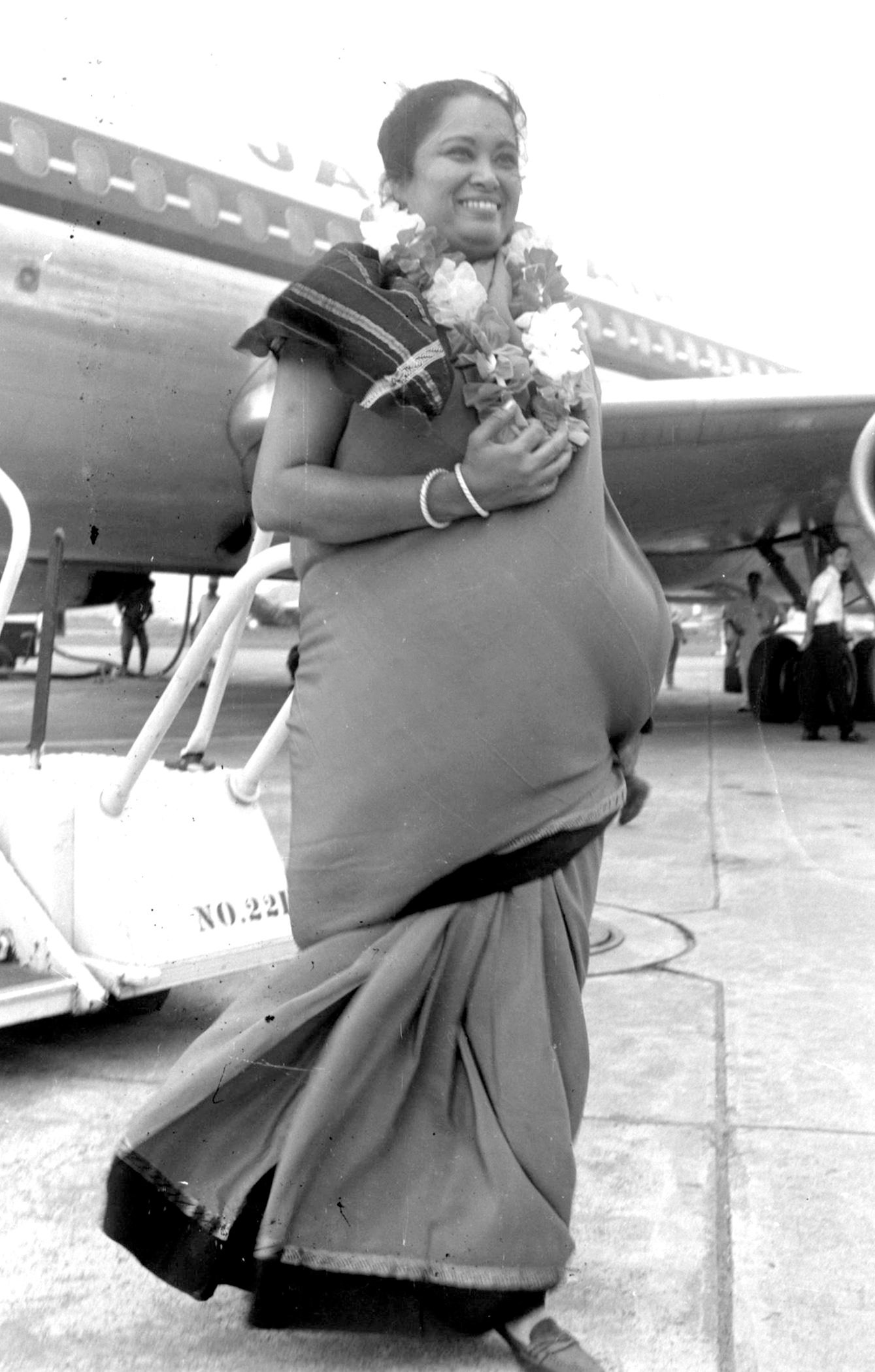
- Devi in 1968
- Born: 4 November 1929; Bangalore, Kingdom of Mysore, British India
- Died: 21 April 2013 (aged 83); Bengaluru, Karnataka, India
- Other name: Human Computer
- Occupations: Author; mental calculator; astrologer
- Spouse: Paritosh Banerji (m. 1964; div. 1979)
- Children: 1

Shakuntala Devi (4 November 1929 – 21 April 2013) was an Indian mental calculator, astrologer, and writer, popularly known as the "Human Computer". Her talent earned her a place in the 1982 edition of The Guinness Book of World Records. However, the certificate for the record was given posthumously on 30 July 2020, despite Devi achieving her world record on 18 June 1980 at Imperial College, London. Devi was a precocious child, and she demonstrated her arithmetic abilities at the University of Mysore without any formal education.

Devi strove to simplify numerical calculations for students. She wrote several books in her later years, including novels as well as texts about mathematics, puzzles, and astrology. She wrote the book The World of Homosexuals (1977), which is considered the first study of homosexuality in India. She saw homosexuality in a positive light and is considered a pioneer in the field.

== Early life ==
Shakuntala Devi was born on 4 November 1929 at Bangalore, Karnataka. to a Kannada Brahmin family. Her father, C V Sundararaja Rao, worked as a trapeze artist, lion tamer, tightrope walker and magician in a circus. He discovered his daughter's ability to memorise numbers while teaching her a card trick when she was about three years old. Her father left the circus and took her on road shows that displayed her ability at calculation. She did this without any formal education. At the age of six she demonstrated her arithmetic abilities at the University of Mysore.

In 1944, at the age of 15, Devi moved to London, United Kingdom.

== Mental calculator ==
Devi travelled to several countries around the world, demonstrating her arithmetic talents. She was on a tour of Europe throughout 1950 and was in New York City in 1976. In 1988, she travelled to the US to have her abilities studied by Arthur Jensen, a professor of educational psychology at the University of California, Berkeley. Jensen tested her performance at several tasks, including calculating large numbers. Examples of the problems presented to Devi included calculating the cube root of 61,629,875 and the seventh root of 170,859,375. Jensen reported that Devi provided the solution to the above-mentioned problems (395 and 15, respectively) before Jensen could copy them down in his notebook. Jensen published his findings in the academic journal Intelligence in 1990.

In 1977, at Southern Methodist University, she computed the 23rd root of a 201-digit number in 50 seconds. Her answer, 546,372,891, was confirmed by calculations done at the US Bureau of Standards using the UNIVAC 1101 computer, for which a special program had to be written to perform such a large calculation. It took the UNIVAC computer 62 seconds to produce the correct answer.

On 18 June 1980, she demonstrated the multiplication of two 13-digit numbers – 7,686,369,774,870 × 2,465,099,745,779. The Department of Computing at Imperial College London randomly picked these numbers. She correctly answered 18,947,668,177,995,426,462,773,730 in 28 seconds. This event was recorded in the 1982 Guinness Book of World Records. Writer Steven Smith commented, "the result is so far superior to anything previously reported that it can only be described as unbelievable."

Shakuntala Devi explained many of the methods she used to do mental calculations in her 1977 book Figuring: The Joy of Numbers.

== Book on homosexuality ==
In 1977, she wrote The World of Homosexuals, the first published academic study of homosexuality in India, for which she was criticised. In the documentary For Straights Only, she said that her interest in the topic was because of her marriage to a homosexual man and her desire to look at homosexuality more closely to understand it.

The book, considered "pioneering", features interviews with two young Indian homosexual men, a male couple in Canada seeking legal marriage, a temple priest who explains his views on homosexuality, and a review of the existing literature on homosexuality. It ends with a call for decriminalisation of homosexuality, and "full and complete acceptance—not tolerance and sympathy". The book, however, went mostly unnoticed at that time.

== Personal life ==
Devi returned to India in the mid-1960s, and she married Paritosh Banerji, an officer of the Indian Administrative Service from Kolkata. They divorced in 1979, after her husband's homosexuality was allegedly revealed. Their daughter Anupama Banerji claimed that Devi lied about her husband being gay to promote her book on homosexuals because her credibility on the subject matter was questioned.

In 1980, she contested the Lok Sabha elections as an independent candidate for Mumbai South and for Medak in Andhra Pradesh (now in Telangana). In Medak she stood against the former Prime Minister Indira Gandhi, saying she wanted to "defend the people of Medak from being fooled by Mrs. Gandhi"; she came ninth, with 6,514 votes (1.47% of the votes). Devi returned to Bangalore in the early 1980s.

In addition to her work as a mental calculator, Devi was a notable astrologer and an author of several books, including cookbooks and novels. She started with writing short stories and murder mysteries, and had a keen interest in music.

== Death and legacy ==
In April 2013, Devi was admitted to a hospital in Bangalore with severe respiratory problems. Over the following two weeks, she had heart and kidney complications. She died in the hospital on 21 April 2013. She was 83 years old. Her daughter Anupama Banerji is married to Ajay Abhaya Kumar, with whom she has two daughters, and lives in London.

On 4 November 2013, Devi was honoured with a Google Doodle on what would have been her 84th birthday.

== In popular culture ==
A film on her life titled Shakuntala Devi was announced in May 2019. The film stars Vidya Balan in the lead title role and features Sanya Malhotra, Amit Sadh, and Jisshu Sengupta in the supporting roles. Produced by Sony Pictures Networks Productions, the film streamed worldwide on Amazon Prime Video on 31 July 2020.

== Selected works ==
- Perfect Murder. New Delhi: Orient Paperbacks. 1976. OCLC 3432320.
- Puzzles to Puzzle You. Delhi: Orient Paperbacks. 1976. ISBN 978-81-222-0014-0. OCLC 881704076.
- Figuring: The Joy of Numbers. New York: Harper & Row. 1977. ISBN 978-0-06-011069-7. OCLC 4228589 – via Internet Archive.
- The World of Homosexuals. New Delhi: Vikas Pub. House. 1977. ISBN 978-0-7069-0478-9. OCLC 3554716.
- More Puzzles to Puzzle You. New Delhi: Orient Paperbacks. 2004. ISBN 978-81-222-0048-5. OCLC 1194441931 – via Internet Archive.
- Astrology for You. New Delhi: Orient Paperbacks. 2005. ISBN 978-81-222-0067-6. OCLC 698472904.
- Mathability: Awaken the Math Genius in Your Child. New Delhi: Orient Paperbacks. 2005. ISBN 978-81-222-0316-5.
- Book of Numbers: Everything You Always Wanted to Know About Numbers but Was Difficult to Understand. New Delhi: Orient Paperbacks. 2006. ISBN 81-222-0006-0. OCLC 931780447.
- In the Wonderland of Numbers: Maths and Your Child. New Delhi: Orient Paperbacks. 2006. ISBN 978-81-222-0399-8. OCLC 933396051.
- Super Memory: It Can Be Yours!. New Delhi: Orient Pub. 2012. ISBN 978-81-222-0507-7. OCLC 1225860729 – via Internet Archive.
