= Ashley Lobo =

Indian-Australian choreographer

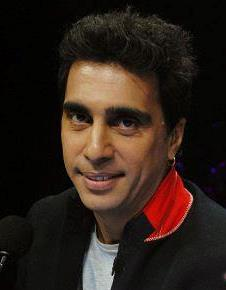
- Born: 18 March 1967 (age 59); Goa, India
- Occupations: Choreographer, Founder of The Danceworx, Founder & Artistic Director of Navdhara India Dance Theatre, Television Personality
- Spouse: Ramneeka Lobo
- Children: 1

Ashley Lobo is an Indian-Australian choreographer of Goan origin and is considered to be a spearhead of international dance in India. He was also one of the three judges for the Indian reality dance talent show India's Dancing Superstar on Star Plus. He is the Founder of The Danceworx and the Founder & Artistic Director of Navdhara India Dance Theatre.

== Career ==
Ashley Lobo's career in performing arts consists of over 40 years of performing, choreographing, and teaching - both in India and internationally. He has choreographed for stage and cinema, with over 35 feature films and as many stage productions to his credit. He trained in Sydney, Australia at the Bodenweiser Dance Centre.

In 1998, Ashley founded The Danceworx Performing Arts Academy (TDX), considered to be a leading institute for learning international dance in India with studios across New Delhi, NCR and Mumbai.

In 2015, he founded Navdhara India Dance Theatre (NIDT), one of India's premier artistic contemporary dance companies.

Ashley has developed Prana Paint™, a sensitizing approach that explores movement through yoga, breath, connectivity, and touch. This technique has put him on the international map and has led to him being regularly invited overseas to conduct workshops and to choreograph international companies.

== International Choreography Work ==
Year	Theatre/ Organisation	Work
2015	Suzanne Dellal Centre for Dance and Theatre, Israel	Amaara
2017	Theater Chemnitz, Germany	Das Dschungelbuch
2018	Zawirowania Dance Theatre, Poland	The Crossing
2019	Suzanne Dellal Centre for Dance and Theatre, Israel	Agni
2019	Landestheater Linz, Austria	Yama
2020	Dance Entropy Company, New York, USA	Home
2020	Japan Foundation	Within
2021	Company E, Washington DC, USA	Y Zero
2022	Landestheater Linz, Austria	Buddha
2022	Club Guy n Roni, The Netherlands	Fortune
2023	Staatstheater Kassel, Germany	Dharma
2023	Japan Foundation	Shakti

Ashley's work has also toured through his company Navdhara India Dance Theatre, which in a short period of 10 years has performed over 175 shows in 17 countries including USA, Canada, France, Germany, South Africa, Israel, Poland, Turkey, China, Bahrain, and Mexico.

His work has also been performed at international festivals like Festival Internacional Cervantino (Mexico), The Lantern Festival (Taiwan), Karmiel Dance Festival (Israel), Shanghai Contemporary Dance Festival (China), Serendipity Arts Festival (India).

Prominent theatres that Ashley's work has been staged in include:

- Suzanne Dellal Centre for Dance and Theatre, Tel Aviv, Israel
- Théâtre National de Chaillot, Paris, France
- Kampnagel, Hamburg, Germany
- Maison de la Danse, Lyon, France
- Harbourfront Centre Theatre, Toronto, Canada
- The Joburg Theatre, Johannesburg, South Africa

== Television Work ==
Year	Show	Role	Genre	Channel
1999-2000	Good Morning India	Self	Dance Fitness Host	STAR Plus
2013	India's Dancing Superstar	Self	Reality Show Judge	STAR Plus

== Film Work ==
Year	Film	Director
2003	In Othello	Roysten Abel
2004	Dhoom	Sanjay Gadhvi
2005	Socha Na Tha	Imtiaz Ali
2006	Ahista Ahista	Shivam Nair
2007	No Smoking	Anurag Kashyap
2007	Namastey London	Vipul Shah
2007	Jab We Met	Imtiaz Ali
2008	U, Me Aur Hum	Ajay Devgan
2008	Tera Kya Hoga Johnny	Sudhir Mishra
2009	Blue	Anthony D'Souza
2009	Love Aaj Kal	Imtiaz Ali
2010	Teen Patti	Leena Yadav
2010	Aisha	Rajshree Ojha
2010	Guzaarish	Sanjay Leela Bhansali
2011	Rockstar	Imtiaz Ali
2011	Pyaar Ka Punchnama	Luv Ranjan
2011	No One Killed Jessica	Raj Kumar Gupta
2011	Aazaan	Prashant Chadha
2012	Cocktail	Homi Adajania
2013	Boss	Anthony D'Souza
2014	One by Two	Devika Bhagat
2014	Lekar Hum Deewana Dil	Arif Ali
2014	Highway	Imtiaz Ali
2015	Bombay Velvet	Anurag Kashyap
2015	Parched	Leena Yadav
2015	Tamasha	Imtiaz Ali
2016	One Night Stand	Jasmine D’Souza
2017	Raabta	Dinesh Vijan
2017	Jab Harry Met Sejal	Imtiaz Ali
2017	Qaidi Band	Habib Faisal
2017	The Wishing Tree	Manika Sharma
2018	Laila Majnu	Sajid Ali
2018	Rajma Chawal	Leena Yadav
2020	Love Aaj Kal 2	Imtiaz Ali
2022	Tell It Like a Woman	Leena Yadav
2022	Qala	Anvita Dutt
2024	Amar Singh Chamkila	Imtiaz Ali
