= Adajania =

Adajania is an Indian (Parsi) toponymic surname for Adajan, a suburb of Surat in India. Notable people with the surname include:

- Aspy Adajania (1942–1994), Indian Army officer and sports administrator, father of Homi Adajania
- Homi Adajania (born 1972), Indian film director and writer
- Nancy Adajania (born 1971), Indian cultural theorist and art critic
- Anaita Shroff Adajania (born 1972), Indian fashion designer
