= Anaita Shroff Adajania =

Indian fashion stylist, costume designer and actress (born 1972)

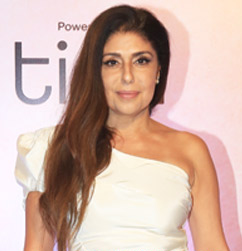
- Adajania in 2025
- Born: 25 February 1972 (age 54); Bombay, Maharashtra, India
- Occupations: Fashion stylist; costume designer; actress
- Years active: 1995–present
- Organization: Vogue India
- Spouse: Homi Adajania (m. 2002)
- Relatives: Vaibhav Talwar (brother-in-law); Aspy Adajania (father-in-law)

Anaita Shroff Adajania (born 25 February 1972) is an Indian fashion stylist, costume designer and actress. She is the Fashion Director for Vogue India's fashion magazine.

== Early life ==
Adajania was born on 25 February 1972 in Bombay (now Mumbai), Maharashtra to a Parsi family. She attended The Bombay International School and St. Xavier's College, Mumbai.

== Career ==
She started her career as assistant fashion editor with Elle magazine, upon its Indian launch in 1996. Subsequently, she worked with L'Officiel India, before becoming the fashion director at Vogue India.

The owner of the Style Cell company, Adajania has been noted for her design work on several Bollywood films including Dhoom 2, Being Cyrus, Everybody Says I'm Fine!, Love Aaj Kal and Cocktail. She has notably styled all three films in the Dhoom series, starting with Dhoom (2004) where she worked with John Abraham and Esha Deol's look, followed by Dhoom 2 (2006) where in she worked with Aishwarya Rai Bachchan, Hrithik Roshan and Bipasha Basu, and also in the sequel Dhoom 3, she styled Katrina Kaif.

Her designs have also been featured in magazines including Vogue, L'Officiel, Elle and Rolling Stone. Shroff also currently styles actress Deepika Padukone exclusively for all of her events.

Apart from this, she has acted in walk-on roles in films, like Dilwale Dulhaniya Le Jayenge (1995), where she played Sheena, Simran's (Kajol) friend in London whom Raj (Shah Rukh Khan) flirts with at the start of the European trip. In Kal Ho Naa Ho (2003), she played Gita, Rohit's (Saif Ali Khan) friend.

== Filmography ==
=== Acting credits ===
Year	Film	Role	Notes and Ref.
1995	Dilwale Dulhania Le Jayenge	Sheena	
2003	Kal Ho Na Ho	Geeta Parekh	
2015	My Choice		English short film

=== Costume designer ===
Year	Film	Notes
2001	Everybody Says I'm Fine!	
2004	Dhoom	
2005	Being Cyrus	
2006	Hope and a Little Sugar	
2006	Dhoom 2	
2008	Krazzy 4	
2008	Bhoothnath	
2009	Love Aaj Kal	
2011	Ra.One	
2012	Players	
2012	Cocktail	
2013	Race 2	
2013	Dhoom 3	
2014	Lekar Hum Deewana Dil	
2014	Finding Fanny	
2014	Bang Bang	
2015	Hero	
2015	Tamasha	
2016	Dear Zindagi	
2016	Ae Dil Hai Mushkil	
2016	Fitoor	
2017	Raabta	
2017	Half Girlfriend	
2018	Race 3	
2018	Andhadhun	
2018	Zero	
2019	War	
2021	Sooryavanshi	
2022	Gehraiyaan	
2022	Brahmāstra	
2023	The Night Manager	
2023	Tiger 3	
2024	Merry Christmas	
2024	Mr. & Mrs. Mahi	
2024	Call Me Bae	Television series
2025	Nadaaniyan	
2025	War 2	
2025	Tu Meri Main Tera Main Tera Tu Meri	
2026	Cocktail 2	

== Personal life ==
She married Indian film director and screenwriter Homi Adajania in 2002. The couple have two sons.

Her sister, Scherezade Shroff is a YouTube vlogger. She married actor Vaibhav Talwar in 2016.

== Awards ==
Year	Award	Category	Work	Result	Ref
2007	8th IIFA Awards	Best Costume Design	Dhoom 2	Won	
2010	11th IIFA Awards	Best Costume Design (shared with Dolly Ahluwalia)	Love Aaj Kal	Won	
