= Udaipur World Music Festival =

- Native name: Udaipur World Music Festival
- Date: February 13–14, 2016
- Venue: Fateh Sagar, Railway Training Institute Ground
- Location: Udaipur; 24.6051541°N 73.6787729°E
- Organised by: SEHER, Hindustan Zinc, wonder cement, Rajasthan Tourism
- Website: http://www.udaipurworldmusicfestival.com

The Udaipur World Music Festival is a cultural event held at Udaipur city in the state of Rajasthan. In this event, artists from around the globe joins to give a variety of performances. The World Music Festival is scheduled to be an annual event, conducted every year in February. The festival features live performances by international artists. Till date, two editions has been conceptualized, the first was held on 13–14 February 2016, the second edition was held from 10–12 February 2017.

== General ==
The first version of India's World Music Festival is conceptualized by Sanjeev Bhargava, produced by SEHER and presented by Hindustan Zinc in association with Wonder cement and Rajasthan Tourism. The cultural organisation SEHER will be responsible for conceptualising and carrying out the event.

== First Edition ==
The first edition of India’s first World Music Festival was held on 13 February 2016. It included global artists and ensembles from more than 12 countries, including Spain, Ghana, Venezuela, Italy, France as well as India. Featured artists joining the event include French composer Mathias Duplessy, Rajasthani vocalist Mukhtiyar Ali, Grammy-award-winning singer Dobet Gnahoré, Sonam Kalra, the Sufi Gospel Project, the Raghu Dixit Project and many more.

=== Featured performers ===
Performers at the festival have included:

- Mathias Duplessy
- Mukhtiyar Ali
- Dobet Gnahoré
- Sonam Kalra
- Raghu Dixit Project

=== Schedule ===
As per official information, schedule will be as follows:

==== 13 February 2016 ====
Venue: Fateh Sagar Paal

Afternoon (2pm - 5pm) Instrumental Quint by

- Saskia Rao-de Haas,
- Shubhendra Rao,
- Sharat Chandra Srivastava,
- FAKHRODDIN GHAFFARI

Fado by

- Carminho

Spanish Guitar by

- José María Gallardo Del Rey

Evening (6pm - 10pm) Venue: Railway Training Institute Ground

Flamenco Music & Dance by

- JUANMA ZURANO & TAMARA. PASO A DOS

African Beat Music by

- Dobet Gnahoré

Fusion Rock Band by

- THE RAGHU DIXIT PROJECT

==== 14 February 2016 ====
Venue: Fateh Sagar Paal Afternoon (2pm - 5pm)

Fusion of Sufi & Gospel Music by

- SONAM KALRA & THE SUFI GOSPEL PROJECT

Moroccan Saharian Soul by

- OUM

Fusion of Sufi & French Music by

- MATHIAS DUPLESSY & Mukhtiyar Ali

Evening (6pm - 10pm)

Venue:Railway Training Institute Ground

Jazz Fusion by

- ITALY MEETS INDIA

Afro Beat Venezuelan Cumbia by

- FAMILY ATLANTICA

Fusion Rock Band by

- PAPON AND THE EAST INDIA COMPANY
