= Finding Fanny =

2014 Indian film by Homi Adajania

- Theatrical release poster
- Directed by: Homi Adajania
- Written by: Homi Adajania; Kersi Khambatta
- Produced by: Dinesh Vijan
- Starring: Naseeruddin Shah; Dimple Kapadia; Pankaj Kapur; Deepika Padukone; Arjun Kapoor
- Narrated by: Deepika Padukone
- Cinematography: Anil Mehta
- Edited by: Sreekar Prasad (Indian- English); Nick Moore (International- English)
- Music by: Mathias Duplessy; Sachin–Jigar
- Production company: Maddock Films
- Distributed by: Fox Star Studios
- Release date: 12 September 2014
- Running time: 101 minutes
- Country: India
- Language: English
- Budget: est. ₹29 crore
- Box office: est. ₹50.61 crore

Finding Fanny is a 2014 Indian English-language satirical road film directed and written by Homi Adajania, produced by Dinesh Vijan under Maddock Films and presented by Fox Star Studios. Naseeruddin Shah, Dimple Kapadia, Pankaj Kapur, Deepika Padukone and Arjun Kapoor feature in prominent roles. The film is based on a road trip set in Goa and follows the journey of five dysfunctional friends who set out on a road trip in search of Fanny, the love interest of Shah's character. The film had its premiere in India on 1 September 2014 and was released worldwide on 12 September 2014. It was selected to be screened at the 19th Busan International Film Festival in October 2014.

== Plot ==
Ferdie Pinto receives a letter at midnight and realises that his one true love, Fanny Fernandes, never knew how he felt about her. Angie, Ferdie's friend, had married Gabo Eucharistica, who died suddenly (Note: Gabo's mother (Rosie), to save money, had the figurines on the wedding cake made out of plastic, not icing. Gabo, in a drunken frenzy, had a piece of cake with the figurines, not realizing he'd swallowed the figurines, and choked to death) during a wedding party. Determined to find Fanny, Ferdie and Angie set out on a journey, joined by Savio Da Gama (a friend of both Angie and Gabo), Gabo’s mother Rosie, and the unsavory artist Don Pedro Cleto Collaco. In the past, Savio had loved Angie but stepped aside after she married Gabo.

On the journey, Ferdie throws Rosie's cat out of the window by accident whilst sneezing as he is allergic; so to keep her unaware, he retrieves the dead cat and pretends that it is sleeping. They visit Fanny's old house and find a deranged Russian, Vladimir, who tells them Fanny sold him the house 20 years ago and moved to Tivoli. Ferdie tells Savio that Rosie's husband is not dead, but instead had run away to Madagascar with another woman, and Rosie had simply lied to the village for the sake of her pride. As they approach Tivoli, Ferdie thanks everyone for joining him on his journey – but unbeknownst to him, most of the other passengers have their own reasons for making the trip. Savio soon realizes that they have gone the wrong way, and are now in the state of Karnataka due to wrong navigation by Ferdie, who cannot read a map. When they run out of petrol, Ferdie volunteers to go and get some in the morning, so the group spends the night in the open field next to the road. Don Pedro tries to seduce Rosie into being a model for his painting, whilst Savio and Angie go away from the others to talk. Savio tells Angie that he does not have a big business in Mumbai as presumed, but rather, he was a waiter for 5 years and is not wealthy. It is revealed that Angie only married Gabo because Savio never asked her, and she was in love with Savio as he was with her. He kisses her, and she slaps him. They eventually talk and, after realizing that they both still have feelings for each other, have sex that night.

In the morning, Ferdie goes to get petrol and comes back to find Rosie posing in the field for Don Pedro, Angie and Savio busy talking. The artist has now dropped his charming attitude of suave sophistication and is mistreating Rosie. When she sees the painting, she is devastated to find that it is a nude, unflattering portrait of her. Don Pedro walks off with the painting and finds the can of petrol that Ferdie has left, along with a letter explaining that he is going on alone and thanking them for coming this far with him. The rest of them start to leave, but Rosie refuses to go, saying that they can't leave Ferdie. She gets extremely upset and begins to yell at Savio, telling him that he should have died instead of Gabo and that Gabo only married Angie because Savio was in love with her. Savio angrily tells Rosie that she is selfish and reveals that her cat is actually dead, but she hadn't even noticed, leaving everyone else to look after it. They bury the cat and set off home. On the way, Rosie accidentally opens the glove compartment in the car and finds Savio's father's revolver. She puts it to her head, intending to shoot herself. When no one notices, she coughs, and Savio sees his dad's revolver, which is an antique and worth a lot of money. He begins to wrestle with Rosie for the gun whilst driving, causing it to go off, and Don Pedro gets shot in the head, without anyone noticing. They turn the car around and go to look for Ferdie, finding him by the roadside waiting for the bus, but can't pick him up as the car brakes fail. The back door of the car opens, and when the car veers close to the cliff edge, Don Pedro's body falls out. The car eventually comes to a stop, and Angie notices that Don Pedro has gone. Rosie says that he jumped out of the car to save himself, but Ferdie sees someone who he thinks is Don Pedro on a passing bus, while in fact, his body is at the bottom of the sea.

The group then carries on to Tivoli to find Fanny. They get to the village and see a funeral procession go past. Ferdie sees a woman that he thinks is Fanny, only to discover that she is Fanny's daughter (Anjali Patil) and the funeral procession is for Fanny. Ferdie is told by her daughter that Fanny was married four times and never even mentioned his name to her daughter, implying that he wasn't important to her. They go to the funeral, and Angie muses that you can't wait for love; you must go out and find it.

Six months later, there is a wedding in the church. The couple is presumed to be Savio and Angie, but is in fact, Ferdie and Rosie. The happy couple drives away into the sunset, leaving behind Angie and Savio kissing near the church as they leave.

== Cast ==
- Naseeruddin Shah as Ferdinand 'Ferdie' Pinto
- Dimple Kapadia as Mrs. Rosalina 'Rosie' Eucharistica
- Pankaj Kapur as Don Pedrò Cleto Colaco
- Deepika Padukone as Angelina ’Angie’ Eucharistica
- Arjun Kapoor as Savio Da Gama
- Anand Tiwari as Father Francis
- Anjali Patil in a dual role as Stefanie 'Fanny' Fernandes and Fanny's daughter
- Mihai Fusu as Vladmir Olianov
- Kevin D'Mello
- Ranveer Singh in a cameo appearance as Gabo Eucharistica, Angie's husband and Rosie's son.

== Production ==
=== Development ===
Homi Adajania wrote the first draft of the screenplay during his month-long stay at the village Salvador do Mundo. During this period, he also studied local Goan Catholics, and added some dysfunctional characters into what he called, "hybrid Marquezian Indian village", which became the fictional village of Pocolim. To get local nuances and cultural research right, he took the help of Goan writer Cecil Pinto. Adajania didn't intend to write the film as a road film; instead, he placed it in the genre of As Good as It Gets (1997). This was his second collaboration with Kersi Khambatta, who also wrote the dialogues for his debut film, Being Cyrus (2006). Khambatta wrote the scenes, chapter by chapter, like a novel, which aided in the development of the script. The screenplay of Finding Fanny was adapted from a novel by Kersi Khambatta. The 200-page novel is expected to hit shelves later in 2015.

He had finished writing the script of Finding Fanny by 2009, 4 years after his first directorial venture Being Cyrus released. However, casting for the film became an issue as it was an offbeat film—Imran Khan and Sonam Kapoor were initially offered roles in the films, though they turned their respective parts down. Dinesh Vijan had suggested against making the film, advising Adajania that "you are going to make a Hinglish film which only 10 people will see." Hence, Adajania postponed the film and went on to direct Cocktail instead. During the shooting of Cocktail, his narration of the story to lead actress Deepika Padukone had impressed her, and she expressed her desire to be a part of the film.

In May 2013, Deepika Padukone and Arjun Kapoor were signed on for leading roles, the latter being assigned the part of "a mechanic, who's in denial about being a loser." Reportedly, Padukone has reduced her usual fee for the film and has also signed a profit-sharing deal with the producers. By August 2013, Naseeruddin Shah and Dimple Kapadia, who earlier featured in Being Cyrus, were signed on for the film; Pankaj Kapur joined the cast the following month. Whilst the film was earlier reported to be a short film, Padukone confirmed in an interview that this was untrue. The film will be showcased in English and Hindi versions to cater for the audience in India and abroad.

Before the filming could commence, sessions and workshops were organised with the actors. A month prior to the shooting, Adajania and Naseeruddin Shah figured out where to place the latter's character emotionally and his body language, through a story arc from vulnerable, even "borderline idiotic" to coming into his strength later in the film. Shah decided to use a mid-range voice, instead of his natural baritone. Arjun Kapoor was convinced to use a restrained acting style, compared to his usual dramatic style, and appear in the "effortlessness of just being".

=== Filming ===
Shooting of the film began in October 2013. The film was shot in various villages across Goa, including Saligao, Parra, Assagao, Aldona, Socorro, and Cortalim, and was completed in 36 days. Dimple Kapadia wore a prosthetic posterior for the film, as she did in Rudaali (1993). The film was shot in English, the Hindi version was subsequently, dubbed in by the actors. On 4 July 2014, the cast shot for a promotional music video for the song "Shake Your Bootiya". The freewheeling dance number was choreographed by Shiamak Davar, giving the actors quirky moves, in keeping with the tone of the film.

== Soundtrack ==
Finding Fanny

Soundtrack album by Mathias Duplessy, Sachin–Jigar
- Released: 21 August 2014
- Genre: Feature film soundtrack
- Length: 12:46
- Label: Sony Music India

Mathias Duplessy chronology
| Delhi in a Day (2011) | Finding Fanny (2014) |

Sachin–Jigar chronology
| Bey Yaar (2014) | Finding Fanny (2014) | Happy Ending (2014) |

The music of Finding Fanny was composed by Mathias Duplessy, duo Sachin–Jigar, and the lyrics were penned by a range of artists, including Mukhtiyar Ali, Alan Mercer, Mayur Puri, and the film's producer, Dinesh Vijan. The first song "Fanny Re" was released on 11 August 2014 in an event in Mumbai, where the second song, "Shake Your Bootiya" written by Dinesh Vijan, Mayur Puri and composed by Sachin–Jigar was also announced. The film's soundtrack was officially released on 19 August 2014.

Finding Fanny Soundtrack
| No. | Title | Lyrics | Music | Singer(s) | Length |
|---|---|---|---|---|---|
| 1. | "Fanny Re" | Mir Mukhtiyar Ali | Mathias Duplessy | Mir Mukhtiyar Ali | 3:07 |
| 2. | "Mahi Ve" | Mir Mukhtiyar Ali | Mathias Duplessy | Mir Mukhtiyar Ali | 3:04 |
| 3. | "Ding Dong" | Alan Mercer | Mathias Duplessy | Mathias Duplessy | 3:23 |
| 4. | "Shake Your Bootiya" | Dinesh Vijan, Mayur Puri | Sachin–Jigar | Divya Kumar | 3:12 |
| Total length: | | | | | 12:46 |

== Release ==
The International English version was edited by Nick Moore. The director, Homi Adajania expressed interest in premiering the film at the Toronto International Film Festival. However, it was decided the film will premiere in India 11 days prior to the film's worldwide release, on 1 September 2014 and therefore the makers decided against the decision. The film has also screened at Busan International Film Festival in October 2014.

Ahead of its release, the film got into a tangle with the Censor Board of India. Late August, the Board asked the director to delete a supposedly 'vulgar' line from the film wherein Deepika Padukone says, "I'm a virgin" to get a UA certificate. The board also demanded a scene wherein Dimple Kapadia's skirt gets torn be "toned down". As of 1 September 2014, the film was still waiting for approval from the Censor Board. The process was slowed down due to the arrest of the Central Board CEO on bribery charges. The film was also rejected permission twice by the Animal Welfare Board of India, due to a scene involving a hen. On 5 September, Adajania confirmed that the CBFC has finally approved the Deepika Padukone dialogue, which was previously removed. This came after he pointed out to the CBFC chairperson that it had already been approved in the film's trailer.

== Marketing ==
On 2 July 2014, the first promotional pictures were released of Arjun Kapoor as Savio Da Gama and Deepika Padukone as Angie. In the picture, Arjun Kapoor dons a pair of shades and a vest, while Deepika Padukone, who plays a Goan girl, is seen wearing an apron and holding a blood-stained butcher's knife. On 8 July 2014, the official posters for the film were released and on 10 July 2014, the official trailer was released. As a first, the makers decided to premiere the film on 1 September 2014 to gauge the response of the film before it releases worldwide.

== Critical reception ==
Finding Fanny received critical acclaim upon release.

Raja Sen of Rediff.com gave the film four stars and said the film gives "much to smile pleasantly at [and] to guffaw at." A reviewer from Bollywood Hungama said, "Writer-director Homi Adajania has dared to break all conventional rules and manages to serve an absorbing and entertaining story that keeps you interested [...] It will surely appeal to the target group of a discerning audience that values sensible entertainment." Sweta Kaushal of Hindustan Times commented that "all the actors have done a brilliant job, fitting perfectly in their characters" and described the picture as a "not-to-be-missed take on life and love". In a four-star review, Mumbai Mirror's Rahul Desai regarded the film as a breakthrough film involving commercial actors, saying "This film is exactly the kind of brave clutter-breaking effort that most critics wish for while lamenting the rigidness of mainstream stars." Sarita Tanwar of Daily News and Analysis praised the film for being "real, funny and thoughtful".

== Box office ==
The film collected ₹51 million (US$530,000) on its opening day on a total of 900 screens which previewed both English and Hindi versions. The film collected ₹199 million (US$2.1 million) in India and $1.6 million from the overseas market in its first weekend. The film grossed £101,000 from UK and $515,000 from the US during its opening weekend. In its first week, Finding Fanny collected a total of ₹281 million (US$2.9 million) crore.

== Awards and nominations ==
| Award | Category | Recipients and nominees | Result | Ref. |
|---|---|---|---|---|
| 7th Mirchi Music Awards | Best Background Score | Mathias Duplessy | Nominated | |
