= My Choice (film) =

2015 Indian film by Homi Adajania

- Promotional poster
- Directed by: Homi Adajania
- Written by: Kersi Khambatta
- Produced by: Dinesh Vijan; Sangita Jindal
- Starring: Deepika Padukone
- Cinematography: Tassaduq Hussain; Stills: Rohan Shreshtha; Kaushal Parikh
- Edited by: Yusuf Khan
- Music by: Mathias Duplessy
- Release date: 28 March 2015
- Running time: 2 minutes 35 seconds
- Country: India
- Language: English

My Choice is a 2015 Indian short film directed by Homi Adajania. Commissioned by Vogue India's empowerment initiative, it features 99 women, including actresses Deepika Padukone and Nimrat Kaur, director Adhuna Akhtar, film critic Anupama Chopra, and model/attorney Scherezade Shroff. The short film questions the gender roles imposed on women by patriarchy and asserts women's right to make free choices.

== Summary ==
According to Mallika Khanna, the short film, shown in monochrome, portrays 99 women from all walks of life, including singers, writers, vegetable vendors, and flower sellers, in moving portraits. Prominent women such Adhuna Akhtar, Anaita Shroff Adajania, Zoya Akhtar, and Anupama Chopra feature. The film opens with a montage of shots of each woman.

The film depicts women undergoing diverse emotional moments like vulnerability, sensual desire, assertion, boldness, anger, defiance, smiles and various movements from awkwardness to dance moves. For example, as a woman whirls, the lyrics tell the listener that to think that a woman's soul can be trapped is to think that sunshine can be contained within palm of one's hand, or that the expansion of the cosmos can be stopped. Visual symbols like bindis, rings and gestures suggest themes of tradition, desire, and agency. The film concludes with Deepika Padukone announcing, "I am the universe. Infinite in every direction. This is my choice". The film ends at 2 minutes and 35 seconds.

== Production ==
The film was directed by Homi Adajania and produced by Dinesh Vijan, the latter of whom was sponsored by Sangita Jindal, chairperson of the JSW Group. Its lyrics were written by Kersi Khambatta. Actress Deepika Padukone bookended the film and also provided the voiceover. The film features music by French composer Mathias Duplessy, using percussion instruments for acoustics along with Tuvan throat singing technique.

== Analysis ==
According to Khanna, the film, notwithstanding its absence of dialogue or a cohesive narrative, conveys its message through striking imagery and audio. Padukone sings lyrics to stress on women's right to freedom of choice. The lyrics begin:

My body, my mind, my choice;

To wear the clothes I like; even if my spirit roams naked; My choice;

to be a size 0 or a size 15; They don't have a size for my spirit, and never will

The women presenting the lyrics expect people not to pass judgment on women's choices relating to clothes, profession, sexual orientation and way of life. The film is an attempt to foster the belief that women have the right to make decisions about their lives, such as what they do with their bodies, how they work out sexual relationships, whom they love, and whether to have children or not.

In an Indian context, the lyricist says:

.. The bindi on my forehead, the ring on my finger adding your surname to mine, they are ornaments. They can be replaced. My love for you cannot. So treasure that...

Jyoti Sharma Bawa of Hindustan Times objects to the comparison of the bindi, which is a significant item in Indian culture, to an ornament.

== Reception ==
In 2024, My Choice had 12 million views on YouTube. Anu Singh Choudhary writes in her Deutsche Welle article that the short film had generated an online debate with contradicting opinions. Some social media users concurred with the message in the film, whereas others questioned its intentions and essence.

Reporter Gunjeet Sra in Quartz criticised the film, calling it hypocritical to claim that a film industry that degraded and imposed beauty standards on women was aligned with feminism. Meagan Tyler, a research fellow at the RMIT University, held a similar opinion; in an article for The Conversation Tyler claims that the film reduced women's empowerment to a series of choices, without considering the circumstances leading to those choices nor their consequences. In The Washington Post, Soraya Nadia McDonald also takes note of Sra's criticism: "..They talk about the prerogative of choice, but they don't explain the burden of those choices. ..".

McDonald nonetheless appreciated "My Choice" as "a call to recognize and respect women's agency". While co-relating the film to the status of women in contemporary India, in the Business Standard, Aletta D'cruz brings to notice patriarchy and gendered violence in India, where as McDonald in the Washington Post points out to the societal challenges faced by Indian women. McDonald states, regarding the lines "...Your mind is caged, let it free. My body is not, let it be ... My choice: To love temporarily, or to lust forever. My choice: to love a man, or a woman, or both. Remember, you are my choice. I'm not your privilege. ..." that it was going to be shocking to conservative Indian audiences for Adajania to openly condone homosexuality and women's right to have sex outside of marriage or to abstain.

Pallavi Aiyar argues in her 2016 book Babies & Bylines: Parenting On the Move that most women have a narrow range of choices available to them, and that the focus should be on widening the range rather than simply encouraging women to make decisions within it. Aiyar says feminism is a political stance that should not be reduced to just a lifestyle choice, and that prioritising choice as a marker of gender equality allows people to forget the need for structural change. Aiyar disagrees with the idea that women should choose, without their partners' input, whether to have children. She also opines that sex outside marriage should not go unquestioned.

Jyoti Sharma Bawa of the Hindustan Times stated that the short film signalled the onset of a culture in India in which women are objectified and encouraged to objectify each other. A Huffington Post UK article by Natasha Hinde states that Deepika Padukone was even slut-shamed for appearing in the video. Hinde called the video a "commendable effort to portray equality".

After facing criticism for implying that infidelity was acceptable with the line "... to have sex outside marriage ... my choice," Deepika Padukone stated that she personally viewed the institution of marriage as sacred and would not endorse infidelity. She said that, though she did not agree with some of the lines in the script, she thought that conveying the film's larger message was important, and was disappointed that several quotes from the film were taken out of context and used against her.

== Academic views ==
Manjima Bhattacharjya in her book "Mannequin Working Women in India's Glamour Industry" explains a decade long development 2015, saying, despite recent background of political backsliding in India, discourse on women's empowerment issues, rights and feminist views have become acceptable same time patriarchy is still holding its own ground. Gauri D. Chakraborty says that, advent of neoliberal feminism in films like My Choice and Veere Di Wedding came amidst these umpteen complex discourses. Mallika Khanna says that the Indian film industry of "women-centric" movies targets an "urban elite consumer." She relays that Alka Kurian stated that Indian feminism has historically been a socialist endeavour that prioritised empowering marginalised communities at the expense of individual aspirations. She states that during the 1990s, neoliberalism and nationalistic paternalism infantilized women. In contrast, contemporary demands for personal autonomy directly challenged earlier paternalism. Khanna writes that the "empowered independent woman" has become a feminist trend in contemporary India. Khanna calls this a neoliberal feminist gaze, and Hemangini Gupta calls this "entrepreneurial" feminism. This trend represents women who crave success, wish to challenge the patriarchy, and demand personal autonomy. They wish to see their dreams satisfied through the goods they buy; these women are a new key demographic in India, to which campaigns and advertisements like "My Choice" are aimed. Khanna believes that women who do not believe in or expect to benefit from this type of feminism are left unnoticed.

In her chapter, 'Choices choices: The myth of neoliberal progress in India', Namrata Rele Sathe says that the promotion of My Choice directly engages with the image of the idealised Indian woman who is defined by her participation in heterosexual marriage and the domestic sphere. Rele Sathe says, she would not prefer to be hasty in rejecting Vogue's empowerment advert altogether for the reason that it raises relevant questions with regards to women's freedom and discusses the politics of sexuality, even if the conceptualisation there in is limited by its context within the economics of neoliberalism.

== See also ==
- Arts and entertainment in India
- Choice feminism
- Dekh Le
- My body, my choice
- Women in India

== Further reading and external links ==
=== Academic sources ===
- V Mahajan, A Chowdhury, U Kaushal, N Jariwala. Springer Gender Equity: Challenges and Opportunities: Proceedings of the 2nd International Conference of Sardar Vallabhbhai National Institute of Technology. Singapore, Springer Nature Singapore, 2023.
- Sharma, Sangeeta. Das, Madhusmita. Sharma and Das et al. 2019 European Journal of Social Sciences.Page 6
- Jethwaney, Jaishri. The Cult of Beauty: Gender Discourse in Indian Advertising. India, Taylor & Francis, 2024.
- Sathe, Namrata Rele. The Neoliberal Self in Bollywood: Cinema, Popular Culture, and Identity. United Kingdom, Intellect Books, 2024.
- Jethwaney, Jaishri. Social Sector Communication: Concepts, Strategies and Case Studies. India, Taylor & Francis, 2024.
- Bhattacharjya, Manjima. Mannequin: Working Women in India's Glamour Industry. N.p., Zubaan.
- Das, Shantanu. Voicing the Choice: Metaphor in Ismat Chughtai's Short Story—"The Quilt". Premier Critical Perspective, Volume 5, Issue 2, May 2022
- Esteve, Gladys B. (2022) "Beyond 'Choice': Theorizing Women's Agency," Budhi: A Journal of Ideas and Culture: Vol. 26: No. 3, Article 3.

=== Non-academic for further reading ===
- Malpani, Snehal. Hold On! A Story of Surviving a Crisis. N.p., Notion Press, 2021.
- Chatterji, Shoma A. The Female Gaze: Essays on Gender, Society and Media. United States, Global Collective Publishers, 2022.Pages 130-135
- Pant, Manasi. Choice Feminism: A Self-Imposed Barrier To Progress? Feminism in India. .org
- Gupta, Shagun Femvertising: How Corporates Co-opt Feminism To Sell Us Things Feminism in India. .org

=== News sources ===
- https://www.newslaundry.com/2015/03/30/why-vogue-needs-to-make-better-choices
- https://www.business-standard.com/article/opinion/is-deepika-padukone-talking-about-the-right-choices-115033000432_1.html
- https://www.firstpost.com/entertainment/we-are-what-we-choose-to-be-deepika-bats-for-women-empowerment-in-new-short-film-2178485.html
