= Guo Gan =

Chinese erhu musician

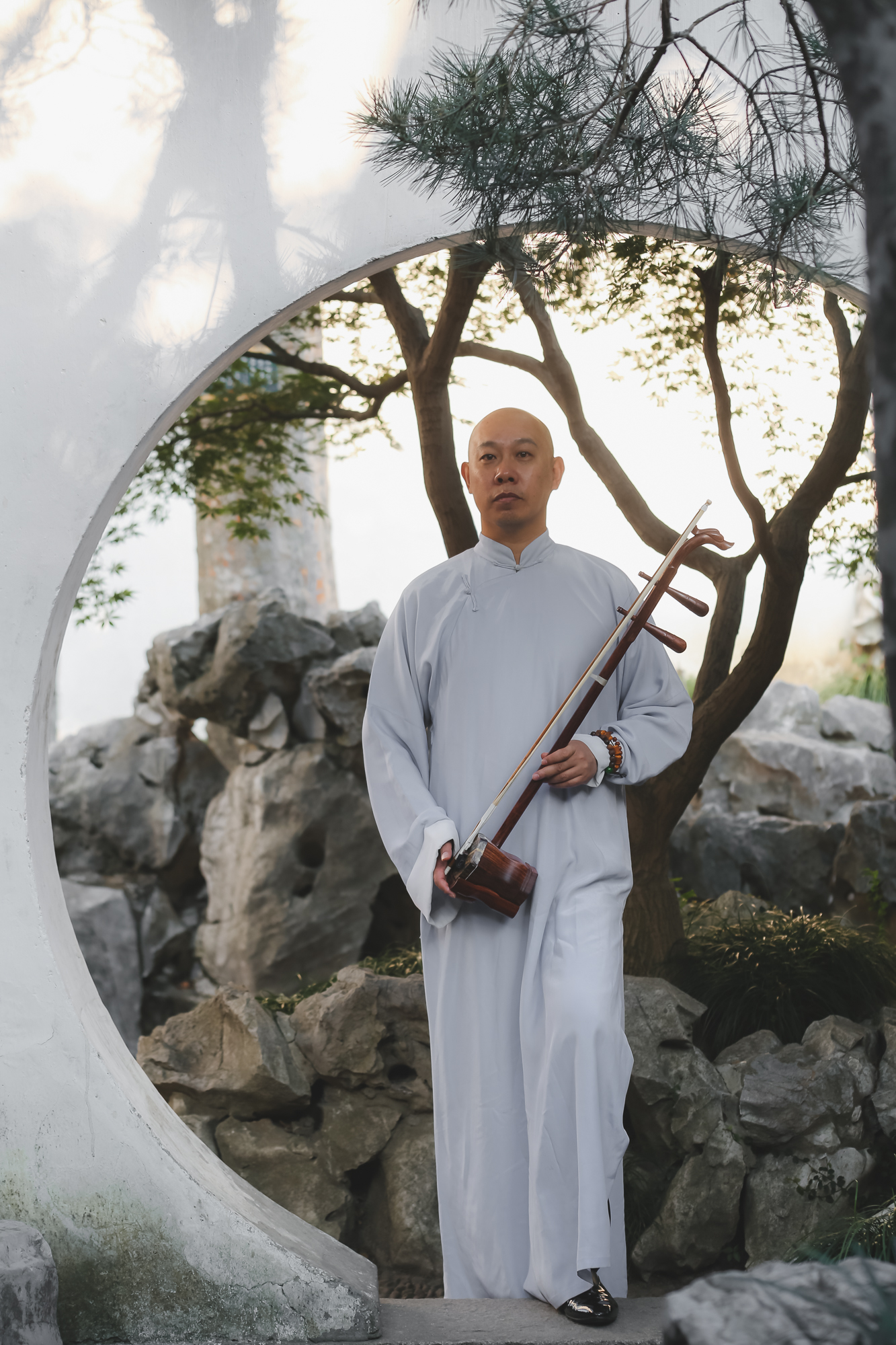
Image of Guo Gan

Guo Gan (Note: In this Chinese name, the family name is Guo.) (Chinese: 果敢; pinyin: Guǒ Gǎn; born November 15, 1968) is an erhu master from Shenyang, China, now based in Paris, France. Gan was recognized as a Knight of the Order of Arts and Letters in 2016. He is the world's first Chinese national folk musician’s recipient, and the world's first Chinese erhu performer to win the award.

== Biography ==
Guo Gan started to learn the erhu at the age of four, and was taught by his father, Guo Junming, a famous erhu soloist. Guo Gan was fascinated by western instruments and rounded out his studies by taking up the violin, the cello and the piano while in secondary school (1981-1987). When he was sixteen, he accompanied his father on tour, playing more than 100 concerts in a presentation entitled “Duo for the two-stringed vielle”. In 1987 he entered the Shenyang Music Conservatory and in 1991 won a prize with honours for his work on the erhu. At the same time, he studied Chinese and Western percussion instruments and gave a jazz concert for percussion and piano. In 1992, he won first prize in the traditional-music competition in the Lioning Province, and in 1995, he was named professor of erhu and percussion at the Conservatory of Liaoning Province. The same year, he was one of the founders of a jazz group, GYQ, which is well known in China.

Guo Gan moved to Paris, France in 2000 or 2001, and obtained a master's degree in percussion from the National Music School of Fresnes. In 2002, he was invited by Gabriel Yared to play in a recording of the music for the film “L’Idole”. He has played in nearly 3000 concerts and he records more than 90 CDs and 70 film scores (Kung Fu Panda 3. The Idol. Shao Lin. Asterix and Obelix: The Middle Kingdom....) He played with many of the world's most famous musician including Lang Lang, Yvan Cassar, Didier Lockwood, Hans Zimmer, Jean Francois Zygel, Gabriel Yared, Sami Yusuf, Stromae, Matthieu Chedid, Nicolas Errèra, Nguyen Le and many others.

28/10/2009 Guo Gan with Lang Lang concert in New York Carnegie Hall .

« Mr. Guo, a magnificent performer, shaped melodies with the expressive contours of vocal lines in Hua Yanjun's“Moon Reflected on the Er-Quan Spring” and provided flourishes that might give a violinist pause during Huang Haihuai's » — Steve Smith, Music review - The New York Times

2009.10. Guo Gan With Lang Lang concert in Chicago Symphonie Hall Los Angeles .Orange Country Hall.

« Guo was a wonder, his erhu sweetly filling the air with an astonishing sweet and sumptuous sonic perfume, which Lang accompanied with exquisite sensitivity and a sense of fun » — Mark Swed, Music review - Los Angeles Times

Big event--

4 octobre 2023 .Guo Gan @HKUST concert in Hong Kong ( China ) 7 décembre 2023 Guo Gan Play with Lang Lang Disney Concert in Dubai.

== Discography ==
2002 : L'idole ( avec Gabriel Yared ) Musique Film . 2002 : Occident Orient Asie ( avec Colette Merklen ). 2004 : Group Fleuve Jaune ( avec Shi KeLong . Wang WeiPing. Wang Jin ). 2005 : concert Eglise Américaine de Paris en Live ( avec Colette Merklen ). 2006 : Rencontre Musicale de L'Europe et de L'Asie (avec ColetteMerklen ). 2007 : Le Premier Cri ( avec Armand Amar ). 2008 : Je Sais Que La Terre est Plate ( Avec Raphael ). 2008 : Paris.Istanbul.Shanghai ( avec Joel Grare ) 2008: Sparrow ( avec Xavier Jamaux et Fred Avril ) Musique Film . 2009 : Horizons ( avec Claude Samard ) 2010 : In One Take ( avec Fiona Sze ) 2010 : Marco Polo ( avec Mathias Duplessy, Enkhjargal Dandarvaanchig et Sabir Khan ) 2011 : Jiangnan Sizhu Music ( avec Lingling Yu ) 2011 : Diagnostic ( avec Ibrahim Maalouf ) 2011 : Jazzin - ( ave Tina Povenzano . Hiroshi Murayama Trio ) 2011 : Shao Lin ( avec Nicolas Erréra ) Musique Film . 2011 : Songs of Freedom ( avec Nguyen Le ) 2012 : Scented Maiden. Solo. 2012 : Skits For the Ears ( avec Franck Vaillant ) 2012 : New Nen Sui Sui ( avec Mieko Miyazaki ) 2012 : Cinéma El Mundo ( Avec Lo'Jo ) 2012 : Le Murmure de L'orient . ( avec Manuel Hermia ) 2013 : Guo Gan " Jasmine Flower " Trio ( avec Lai Long Han .Ying Rao ) 2013 : Journey to the Forbiden City ( avec Sylvain Bezia ) 2014 : Himalaya. Solo. 2015 : The Kite ( avec Loup Barrow ) 2015 : Ceazy Horse ( avec Mathias Duplessy, Enkhjargal Dandarvaanchig et Aliocia Regnard ) 2016 : Peace In The World ( avec Aly Keita ) 2016 : Lune De Jade ( avec Emre Gultekin ) 2016 : Songs From the Imperial Plalace ( avec Zou Lun Lun ) 2016 : Kung Fu Panda 3 ( avec Hans Zimmer ) Musique Film . 2018 : Moon Night. Solo. 2018 : Spring Breeze From Home ( avec Jessica Yuen . ) 2018 : Jazz Jasmine Flower ( avec Park Stickney. Jessica Yuen .) 2018 : Jazz Standard ( avec Park Stickney. Jessica Yuen ) 2019 : Gobi Desert ( avec Emre Gultekin .Levent Yildirini ) 2019 : Beijing HuTong ( Thierry Girault . Frédéric Folmer .Thibaud Pontet ) 2020 : Saba Sounds ( avec Zoumana Tereta et Richard Bourreau ) 2020 : Brothers of String ( avec Mathias Duplessy, Enkhjargal Dandarvaanchig et Aliocia Regnard ) 2020 : Gaia ( avec Henning Fuchs ) 2021 : The Silk Way ( avec Fabio Turchetti ) 2022 : Guo Gan "Swordmen" Trio ( avec Liu Yi Qing, Chen Jian ) 2022 : Lang Lang Disney Book ( avec Lang Lang ) 2023 : Three Perfumes Trio ( Guo Gan . Houng Thanh .Fumie Hihara ) 2023 : Monteverdi World ( avec Fabio Turchetti . Alberto Venturini )
