= GYQ =

GYQ may refer to:

- GYQ, ticker symbol for FD Technologies, a company listed on Euronext Dublin
- GYQ, jazz group that Guo Gan was a part of in 1995
- GYQ, division code for Guangyang, Langfang, China
