= Vaibhav Talwar =

Indian model and film actor

- Born: 21 August 1981 (age 44); New Delhi
- Occupations: Model, Actor, YouTuber
- Spouse: Scherezade Shroff Talwar (m. 2016)
- Relatives: Anaita Shroff Adajania (sister-in-law)

Vaibhav Talwar is an Indian model and film actor.

== Personal life ==
He was born and brought up in New Delhi, India. He is into martial arts, and practised taekwondo.

He married Scherezade Shroff, sister of Indian fashion designer Anaita Shroff Adajania, in 2016. They worked for the same modeling agency in Delhi and started dating in November 2004.

== Modelling ==
He began his modelling career with an assignment for Hugo Boss. He then went on working with fashion designers like Tommy Hilfiger, J.J. Valaya, Raghuvendra Rathore, Aki Narula, Manish Malhotra, Narender Kumar, Siddarth Tytler, Kunal Rawal and Suneet Verma.

With modelling brand image, he did print advertisements for brands like HP, Asian Paints, LG, Grasim, ABN AMRO, Airtel, Nokia and Manyavar.

He did television advertisements for brands like NDTV, Asian Paints, Dulux paints, Citibank, Cadbury, Royal Stag, Hindustan Petroleum (HPCL), GNIIT, Vivel Shampoo, Sony Ericsson, LG, Samsung Mobiles, Vimal suitings, Tata Nano and Manyavar.

== Filmography ==
He debuted in films with Teen Patti (2010) starring Amitabh Bachchan and Ben Kingsley, directed by Leena Yadav. In 2011, he acted in the films Mausam, and Love Breakups Zindagi alongside Dia Mirza. Earlier in his career, he played a lead role in Jasoos Vijay, a BBC production.

- Jasoos Vijay (2002, TV Series)
- Teen Patti (2010)
- Love Breakups Zindagi (2011)
- Mausam (2011)
