= Saira Mohan =

Canadian model

- Born: Saira Mohan; 1978; Montreal, Quebec, Canada
- Website: http://www.saira.com/

Saira Mohan is a Canadian model of Indian, Irish and French heritage. She is actively involved with product endorsements worldwide. Born in Montreal, Quebec, Canada, she has two sons.

== Career ==
Successful for many years prior in New York City, she was launched into international fame in 2003 after Newsweek put her on the cover with the headline "The Perfect Face". Aside from appearing on countless magazine covers worldwide, including ELLE, Cosmopolitan, L'Officiel, and Town & Country, Mohan has participated in several World Economic Forum events as an invited speaker, as well as at the 2006 India Today conclave.

She made her Bollywood debut with Karan Johar's Kabhi Alvida Naa Kehna (2006), in which she starred as Catherine, the second wife of Abhishek Bachchan's character, Rishi. Her second venture, Teen Patti was released in February 2010. She was ranked #91 on the Maxim Hot 100 Women of 2002.

Mohan wrote a self-published book titled How To Seduce (and Marry) the Woman of Your Dreams. In 2012, she joined Indian Independent Ad Agency Bang in the Middle as head of their US Operations Since 2016, Saira has worked as a realtor with Baum Realty Group and Colliers.
