= Rakhi – Atoot Rishtey Ki Dor =

- Also known as: Rakhi - Atoot Rishtey Ki Dor
- Created by: Film Farm India
- Directed by: Pawan Kumar
- Starring: see below
- Music by: Abhijeet Hegdepatil
- Opening theme: "Rakhi" by Pamela Jain
- Country of origin: India
- No. of seasons: 1
- No. of episodes: 325

Production
- Producers: Pintu Guha, Rupali Guha, & Harsh Dave
- Running time: approx. 23 minutes

Original release
- Network: Zee TV
- Release: 27 August 2007 – 12 February 2009

Rakhi – Atoot Rishtey Ki Dor is a Hindi TV serial that airs on Zee TV since 27 August 2007 until 12 February 2009. It looks at the complex scenario within which a brother-sister relationship goes through.

== Plot ==
The story is based on the life of Nandini, who is torn between love and duty towards her brother, Raja. The dilemma is who should she abandon - the love of her husband or her loving brother?

Besides that, as the story progresses, Bhai Raja marries a girl named Neelima. But Neelima's brother Aaryan and grandmother are unhappy with her marriage with Bhai Raja because Bhai Raja didn't allow his sister Nandini to get marry to Aaryan. Now Neelima's grandma wants to separate Bhai Raja and Neelima because of how Raja insulted her. So she sends Neelima's best friend (Nisha and her sister Nikita) to take revenge on Bhai Raja. The first plan is Nisha will have a friend bring liquid into the house and spray it on Raja knowing that Raja won't like it and will bring up a big scene but Neelima stands up for him and the plan goes totally flop. So Nisha meets Neelima's grandmother at a swimming pool Raja and Neelima are there too because Raja's friend was going to meet them there. They see Nisha they are just about to go to her table when they meet Raja's friend. Nisha rushes home. Ambar and Nikita have just come home from shopping buying everyone gifts and Gunjan (Raja's Younger sister) wears western clothing but everyone except Neelima laughs. Neelima make Gunjan happy. The only reason Gunjan wants to be like Nikita is that Ambar likes Nikita but Gunjan likes him and Ambar hates her. Then Gunjan curls her hair and wears western when Fatima Bi starts yelling at her but Neelima tells Fatima Bi that every girl wants to do all this so let her and Neelima gives her a makeup set. Nisha is watching everything. Nisha calls Nikita she's at a club with Ambar and Nikita is just faking to love Ambar. They eventually leave after Neelima finds out Nikki was working with Aryan to get information on the family.

Amber and Gunjan one night slept together which resulted in Gunjan becoming pregnant. At this point in the story, Raja Amber and Nandini's father has come back into the picture after a long absence. He instigates Amber into hating Gunjan. After everyone in the family discovers what happened between the two of them, Raja gets Amber and Gunjan married. But Amber vows to Gunjan that he will never love her. As time goes on, he still won't come close to Gunjan and she is unhappy but won't say anything because she knows it will hurt the family.

After a failed attempt at marriage again, Nandini is now married to her friend Prince. Nobody was happy at first about this secret wedding, but then everyone deals with it and eventually become okay with it. Meanwhile, Price's older sister, Kadambari, is only interested in the fact that Nandini comes from a wealthy family; and so she wants Balraj's money. She makes side comments to Nandini saying how they are poor and how she doesn't have any money so she can make Nandini feel bad. Kadambari burned down her own house so she could go live with Raja and live the life of a rich woman. No matter how much she tries, Kadambari still doesn't get what she wants.

Nandini and her in-laws are still living with Raja and have said they will stay there permanently. Neelima is now pregnant and Raja is adamant about giving their firstborn to Nandini who was left barren from an accident. Nandini keeps telling Raja she does not want to have their child because she knows Neelima does not want to give her child up. This issue is creating a big problem in the house until we find out Nandini is "pregnant". Everyone in the family is so happy because three children will be born in their house.

Before Nandini announces she is "pregnant" she had discussed the option of surrogacy with Prince who was against the idea. Nandini had said that was the only way to keep the family happy and to stop Raja from giving his child to her. Nandini couldn't find a surrogate right away so she announces that she is pregnant. Although everyone thinks it is a miracle, the truth is she lied to she could have some time to find a surrogate. No one knows this except Prince. Now Nellima is in a coma after fighting over something. A five-year leap happens Pari Nelima's daughter thinks that Nandini is her mother and Prince is her father.

BR says he will meet Neelima and comes home. Everyone else leaves. BR tells Neelima that he is in a dilemma since Prince is getting such a big opportunity and on the other hand Pari and Nandini will have to go with him. What should he do? He gets a flash where Neelima had told him that she would want her child to get the love of both her parents. BR comes back to see Nandini feeding pari, how she takes care of her. BR is in his room and thinks about how will he separate from Nandini as well. We see that Nandini and prince are packing, and then they meet everyone and leave for Dubai. Pari comes and asks BR where they are going. BR says Dubai, Pari runs after Nandini and Prince who are in the car. BR follows. Pari has an accident. BR comes out of the nightmare. Prince is talking on the phone and saying that he cannot go to Dubai because of some family problems. BR says he will go to Dubai. BR convinces prince and Nandini to go. Prince says that, but he has to go for three years. BR and Nandini are shocked.

== Cast ==
- Ayub Khan as Balraj Thakur "Bhai Raja" (elder brother of Nandini and Amber)
- Nupur Joshi as Rajnandini (Nandini) Thakur / Rajnandini (Nandini) Prince Mathur (younger sister of Balraj and Amber; Prince's wife)
- Faisal Raza Khan as Aryan (Neelima's brother)
- Kartik Sabharwal / Rahul Lohani as Prince Mathur (Kadambari's younger brother; Nandini's husband)
- Sharhaan Singh as Amber Thakur (Balraj and Nandini's younger brother; Gunjan's husband)
- Farida Dadi as Fatima (like a mother to Balraj, Nandini, and Amber; Gunjan's mother)
- Ami Trivedi as Mukti (will be the surrogate mother of Nandini and Prince's child, prostitute)
- Aastha Chaudhary / Shweta Rastogi as Gunjan Amber Thakur (Fatima's daughter; Amber's wife)
- Monalika Bhonsle as Neelima Balraj Thakur (Balraj's wife; Aryan's elder sister)
- Sanjay Swaraj as Mr. Thakur (father of Balraj, Nandini and Amber)
- Vaishnavi Mahant as Mrs. Thakur (mother of Balraj, Nandini and Amber)
- Rajeeta Kochar as Dadi (Neelima and Aryan's grandmother)
- Aashish Kaul as Sujeet (Kadambari's husband)
- Supriya Shukla as Kadambari Mathur (Sujeet's wife; Prince's elder sister)
- Karishma Randhawa as Nisha (Neelima's ex-friend, Nikita's elder sister )
- Monaz Mevawala as Nikita (Nisha's younger sister)
