= Khushiyan =

- Written by: Kapil Kumar
- Directed by: Kapil Kumar
- Starring: See below
- Country of origin: India
- Original language: Hindi
- No. of episodes: 104

Original release
- Network: DD National
- Release: 2003 – 2004

Khushiyan is a comedy TV show written and directed by Kapil Kumar, broadcast on DD National in 2003–2004. The show stars Kanwaljit Singh in a lead role, with Amrapali Gupta playing his daughter, supported by Nupur Joshi, Neelu Kohli, Susheel Parashar, Dinesh Hingoo and others.

== Cast ==
- Kanwalijit Singh as Mahesh
- Amrapali Gupta as Khushi, Mahesh's daughter
- Nupur Joshi as Preeti
- Neelu Kohli as Charu, Preeti's mother
- Susheel Parashar as Preeti's father
- Lata Sabharwal
