= Shabd (film) =

2005 Indian film by Leena Yadav

- Theatrical release poster
- Directed by: Leena Yadav
- Written by: Leena Yadav
- Produced by: Pritish Nandy Communications
- Starring: Sanjay Dutt; Aishwarya Rai; Zayed Khan
- Cinematography: Aseem Bajaj
- Edited by: Leena Yadav
- Music by: Vishal–Shekhar
- Distributed by: Pritish Nandy Communications
- Release date: 4 February 2005
- Language: Hindi
- Budget: Rs. 7 crores
- Box office: Rs. 12.08 crores

Shabd (transl. Words) is a 2005 Indian Hindi-language psychological art film produced by Pritish Nandy Communications, and directed by Leena Yadav. It stars Sanjay Dutt, Aishwarya Rai and Zayed Khan. The film got good reviews but performed below expectations at the box office, despite being profitable. The story is adapted from the critically acclaimed Malayalam film Rachana released in 1983.

== Plot ==
Shaukat Vashisht is a writer and the husband of Antra, a lecturer. He leads a wealthy lifestyle in India. He achieved fame when he was nominated for, and won, the Booker Prize. However, his subsequent works disappointed his publishers, and he became so depressed that he almost gave up writing. He then decided to write a story about a woman named Tamanna, basing it on his wife Antara. To this end, he began to observe her closely. He discovered that she had a secret admirer: a dashing young teacher named Yash Agnihotri with a bright future ahead of him. Shaukat also realised that Antara had never mentioned Yash to him and had not told Yash that she was married.

He decided to write a story in which Antara hid her marital status from Yash and pursued a relationship with him. However, things go wrong when Antara begins to develop real feelings for Yash despite still loving Shaukat.

Whatever Shaukat writes comes true. He begins to believe that he can alter the fates of Antara and Yash through his writing. According to his logic, Yash will kill himself once he finds out the truth about Antara. However, Antara soon finds out about this. She lies to him, telling him that Yash really did commit suicide, in order to disillusion him. Overwhelmed with guilt, Shaukat develops schizophrenia. The film ends on a disturbing note: Antara has Shaukat admitted to a mental health facility due to his condition.

== Cast ==
- Sanjay Dutt as Shaukat Vashisth, a famous author, who lives with his wife Antara and two servants.
- Aishwarya Rai as Antara Vashisth / Tamanna, Shaukat's wife and a college teacher.
- Zayed Khan as Yash Agnihotri, a young college teacher, who is in love with Antara.
- Aakash Pandey as Shouting asylum inmate
- Sadiya Siddiqui as Rajni (maidservant)
- Brijendra Kala as Servant (Ramakant)
- Alexander as the stranger
- Susheel Chhabra as Nerd
- Imram Hasnee as Asylum Doctor
- Kamini Khanna as Mrs. Kapadia
- Lalit Parashar as Mr. Bhargva
- Rucha Pathak as Publisher's assistant

== Music ==
Shabd

Soundtrack album by Vishal–Shekhar
- Released: 11 December 2004
- Genre: Feature film soundtrack
- Label: T-Series

The music of the film did get good reviews among audiences, though the film overall performed well below expectations at the box office. All Songs Composed By Vishal-Shekhar and lyrics penned by Irshad Kamil The film had the following soundtrack.

Song	Singer	Picturised on/Notes
"Khoya Khoya"	Sonu Nigam, Sunidhi Chauhan	Zayed Khan, Aishwarya Rai
"Sholon Si"	Vishal Dadlani, Sunidhi Chauhan	Sanjay Dutt, Aishwarya Rai
"Lo Shuru Ab"	Kumar Sanu, Sunidhi Chauhan	Sanjay Dutt, Aishwarya Rai
"Bolo To"	Sonu Nigam, Shreya Ghoshal	Zayed Khan, Aishwarya Rai
"Mat Jaa"	Sukhwinder Singh,	Sanjay Dutt, Aishwarya Rai
