= Jasoos Vijay =

- Title card of the 1st season of Jasoos Vijay featuring Adil Hussain and Om Puri
- Genre: Action, Thriller, Crime
- Created by: BBC World Service Trust. Executive Producer Drama: Rumu Sen-Gupta
- Written by: Aparajita Saha, Sanjeev Sharma
- Creative director: Devika Bahl
- Presented by: Om Puri
- Starring: Adil Hussain (Season 1-2); Minha Zamir (Season 1-2); Farhan Khan (Season 3); Purva Parag (Season 3); Vaibhav Talwar (Season 3); Nupur Joshi (Season 3)
- Country of origin: India
- Original language: Hindi
- No. of seasons: 3
- No. of episodes: 195

Production
- Executive producer: Rumu Sen-Gupta
- Running time: 22-26 minutes
- Production companies: BBC World Service Trust; Doordarshan; National AIDS Control Organisation

Original release
- Network: DD National
- Release: June 2002 – September 2006

Jasoos Vijay is an Indian detective mystery TV series produced by BBC World Service Trust in collaboration with Doordarshan and National AIDS Control Organisation to spread awareness about HIV/AIDS among the masses in India. It premiered on DD National in June 2002. A total of three seasons were aired till its end in September 2006.

The series was centered on Vijay, a private detective and Gauri, his assistant who later went on to become his wife. The series was divided into a number of mini-series with each mini-series usually extending to one month and in each mini-series, Vijay solved one case.

The show became a huge success and is among the top ten rated television series in India and was one of the three most watched television series during its run. The weekly viewership of the series reached the level of 15 million during the third season. The series was awarded Thriller of the Year at the 2003 Indian Telly Awards.

== Cast ==
- Om Puri as the presenter of the series. At the end of each episode, he addressed the issue of HIV/AIDS by visiting a rural area and talking to the common people there or by answering the letters of viewers. Viewers were invited to write to him and attempt to nail the culprit before Vijay does. There were prizes for the best answers which would include a chance for the viewer to appear on the show and name his or her suspects.
- Adil Hussain/Farhan Khan^{[A]} as Jasoos Vijay - a private detective and the main protagonist of the series. At the end of first season, he was shown as suffering from HIV/AIDS though it was never disclosed how he became HIV positive.
- Minha Zamir/Purva Parag^{[B]} as Gauri - assistant and later wife of Vijay. She first appeared in the first episode as the sister of the victim Tara. At the end of the first mini-series, she became an assistant of Vijay. She later fell in love with him and married him.
- Vaibhav Talwar as Jeet - assistant of Vijay. He appeared in third season during one of the mini-series and later joined Vijay as an assistant. At the end of the series, Vijay assigned him the role of detective and took a retirement.
- Nupur Joshi as Parvati - another assistant of Vijay and love interest of Jeet. She first appeared in the third season and joined Vijay as an assistant. At the end of the third season, she and Jeet fell in love with each other.

== Production ==
In response to the growing number of HIV/AIDS cases in India, BBC World Service Trust launched a campaign in 2002 on HIV/AIDS awareness in collaboration with Doordarshan and National AIDS Control Organization. The campaign focused on creating awareness about HIV/AIDS and its prevention. It included public service advertisement (spots), production and telecast of a detective drama series Jasoos Vijay and Youth television show Haath Se Haath Milaa.

Doordarshan provided media consultancy and were producers for public service spots and airtime for the spots. NACO gave technical guidance and sponsored the series, whereas BBC bore the production costs. Financial benefits of commercial sponsorship from the serial went to Doordarshan and the rights to software were shared by the three partners.

During the conceptualisation of the programme, Nielsen Company's data revealed that action or thriller genre were the second most popular type of content on general entertainment channels in India. Therefore, it was decided that Vijay will be portrayed as a private detective and show will have all the ingredients of a Bollywood-style thriller movie. Vijay was shown an HIV positive person but his HIV status was not revealed until the show had become popular so as not to risk rejection of the main character at the outset of broadcasting. Also the way in which he became HIV positive was never disclosed. The character was designed for mass audience and therefore was not given a surname. He was shown solving crime cases only in rural areas to broaden the appeal of the programme. After successful reception of the first season and a huge response by viewers, two more seasons of the series were produced.

== Elements of the show ==
=== HIV/AIDS Awareness ===
The central character Vijay was portrayed as HIV positive, allowing the programme to address issues of the care and treatment of those living with the virus, and tackling the stigma and discrimination, as well as awareness and prevention. Key messages about HIV prevention, testing and treatment, as well as stories covering social issues such as dowry and violence against women were also broadcast through the series.

=== Identify the culprit ===
At the end of each episode, Om Puri answered the letters of viewers. Viewers were invited to write to him and attempt to nail the culprit before Vijay does. There were prizes for the best answers which would include a chance for the viewer to appear on the show and name his or her suspects.

== Seasons ==
=== Season 1 ===
The first season consisted of a total of 120 episodes divided into 10 mini-series with each mini-series consisting of 12 episodes and spread over one month. The first mini-series was titled The Missing Bride and its first episode was aired on television in June 2002. The first episode has Jasoos Vijay going to a village in Rajasthan to investigate the family background of a potential bride Tara. The second mini-series was named Kidnapped.

Due to the increasing popularity of the series, it was dubbed into five more languages: Bengali, Malayalam, Kannada, Tamil and Telugu. The show was also aired in Cambodia, Thailand and parts of Africa in their regional languages.

=== Season 2 ===
Title card of the 3rd season of Jasoos Vijay featuring Om Puri and Farhan Khan

The first episode of the second season was telecast in December 2003. The second season constituted a total of 25 episodes. and was dubbed into five more languages: Bengali, Malayalam, Kannada, Tamil and Telugu.

=== Season 3 ===
The first episode of the third season was aired on 4 September 2005. The season constituted of a total of 50 episodes. It saw the emergence of two more characters, Jeet and Parvati who later became assistants of Vijay and Gauri. Jeet met Vijay when he was solving a case at the Surajkund and becomes his assistant. During the third season, Vijay contracted Tuberculosis and was undergoing treatment. He goes to Manali with Gauri, Jeet and Parvati to recuperate from his illness but they get involved in solving a case of the lost identity of a girl Shubbhi. As Vijay is ill, Jeet takes the lead in solving the case. The case also involved a love triangle between Jeet, Parvati and Shubbhi. The third season ended in September 2006. The last mini-series saw Vijay as critically ill and the culmination of romance between Jeet and Parvati into a relationship. The last episode of the third series was shot at Old Fort. At the end of the last episode, Vijay and Gauri took retirement and handed over the responsibility of solving the cases to Jeet and Parvati.

The third season was dubbed into seven languages: Tamil, Telugu, Malayalam, Bengali, Oriya, Gujarati and Assamese.

== Reception ==
The show became a huge success and is among the top ten rated television series in India and was one of the three most watched television series during its run. The weekly viewership of the series reached the level of 15 million during the third season. Overall, the show was watched by estimated 185 million viewers.

At the peak of the programme, it received 1,500 letters per month. During the first season, it received 35,000 letters and 12,000 emails whereas in the last season, it received a total of 15,000 letters. A website was also created for more information and it received 50-100 emails per month. The series was awarded Thriller of the Year at the 2003 Indian Telly Awards.

After the show went off-air, an end-line survey was conducted in 2007 and it was found that viewers did change in terms of their HIV related knowledge, attitudes and behaviours. 86 percent of the respondents said they had learnt something new about HIV/AIDS while 32 percent said they had discussed HIV/AIDS with others.

== Awards ==
- Thriller of the Year at the 2003 Indian Telly Awards.

== See also ==
- List of programs broadcast by DD National

== Notes ==
- ^{A} Adil Hussain portrayed the role of Vijay in the first and second season while Farhan Khan portrayed it in the third season.
- ^{B} Minha Zamir portrayed the role of Gauri in the first and second season while in the third season, it was portrayed by Purva Parag.
