= Gulab Singh Tanwar =

- Born: 1964 (age 61–62); India
- Occupations: Film Producer; Businessman
- Years active: 1999–present
- Organization: Saarthi Airways
- Known for: 72 Hoorain; Parched; Rajma Chawal

Gulab Singh Tanwar (also known as Captain Gulab Singh; born 1964) is an Indian film producer, business personality and a former pilot having worked with Indian Airlines. He is the founder and owner of Saarthi Airways which provides helicopters and aircraft to Corporates, HNI and politicians specialising in Election flying including top political leaders. He started this venture by leasing helicopter to Ajay Devgn Starrer film "Kacche Dhaage" in 1999.

He is known for his produced films like 72 Hoorain, Parched, Te3n and Rajma Chawal.

== Filmography ==
Year	Title	Producer	Ref
2015	Parched	Yes	
2016	Te3n	Yes	
2018	Rajma Chawal	Yes	
2018	Chuskit	Yes	
2020	The Shepherdess and the seven songs	Yes	
2022	Naanera	Yes	
2023	72 Hoorain	Yes	
