= Nupur Joshi =

Indian actress

- Born: Delhi, India
- Education: MS Psychology Honours from Daulat Ram College
- Occupation: Actress
- Years active: 2003–present
- Known for: Jasoos Vijay, Rakhi – Atoot Rishtey Ki Dor, Khushiyan, Do Hanson Ka Jodaa

Nupur Joshi is an Indian actress who primarily works in Hindi television and films. She gained recognition for her roles as Nandini Thakur in Rakhi – Atoot Rishtey Ki Dor, Parvati in Jasoos Vijay and Preeti in Khushiyan. Joshi established herself as an actress with her portrayal of Esha in Ayan Mukerji's romantic comedy filmYeh Jawaani Hai Deewani, Mishri in the Drama TV series Kumkum – Ek Pyara Sa Bandhan and Sumi in Do Hanson Ka Jodaa.

== Early life and education ==
Joshi was born into a Hindu family in Delhi. She graduated with an MS in Psychology Honours from Daulat Ram College. During her college days, Joshi performed plays in collaboration with the National School of Drama (NSD).

== Career ==
=== Television debut and breakthrough ===
She began her acting career in 2003 with the television series Khushiyan, where she played the lead role of Preeti. Her early success continued in 2003 with the horror anthology series Ssshhhh...Koi Hai as Lily And in the year 2005, she played the lead role of Parvati in the television series Jasoos Vijay. Joshi's talent for portraying emotionally complex characters led her to prominent roles throughout the 2000s, including her performance as Nandini Thakur in Rakhi – Atoot Rishtey Ki Dor (2007), a critically appreciated lead role. The same year, she was also seen in a supporting role as Mishri in the long-running show Kumkum – Ek Pyara Sa Bandhan. In 2010, she starred as Sumi in Do Hanson Ka Jodaa, again taking on a lead role, while also appearing as Mandira in the supporting cast of Baat Hamari Pakki Hai.

In the later stages of her career, Joshi continued to engage audiences with meaningful supporting roles, including her portrayal of Soumya Goenka in the widely acclaimed series Yeh Rishta Kya Kehlata Hai (2017). Expanding into digital media, she appeared in the TV series Split in 2020, showcasing her adaptability to new formats and platforms. Most recently, in 2023, she played the role of Swamini in the youth-centric series Campus Beats.

=== film career ===
Joshi began her film journey in 2013 with a supporting role as Esha in the hit Bollywood film Yeh Jawaani Hai Deewani, where she shared screen space with a prominent ensemble cast. In 2014, she took on her first leading role in the short film Katputliwala, portraying the complex character of Laxmi. After a brief hiatus from the screen, she returned in 2018 with short film appearances Interior, in which she played a neighbor, and U-Turn, where she took on the role of a sister in 2019.

== Filmography ==
=== Television ===
Year	Title	Role	Notes
2003	Khushiyan	Preeti	Lead role
2003	Ssshhhh...Koi Hai	Lily	Lead role
2005	Jasoos Vijay	Parvati	Lead role
2007	Kumkum – Ek Pyara Sa Bandhan	Mishri	Supporting cast
2007	Rakhi – Atoot Rishtey Ki Dor	Nandini Thakur	Lead role
2010	Do Hanson Ka Jodaa	Sumi	Lead role
2010	Baat Hamari Pakki Hai	Mandira	Supporting cast
2017	Yeh Rishta Kya Kehlata Hai	Soumya Goenka	Supporting cast
2020	Split	TV Series	Supporting Cast
2023	Campus Beats	Swamini	Supporting Cast

=== Films ===
Year	Title	Role	Notes
2013	Yeh Jawaani Hai Deewani	Esha	Supporting Cast
2014	Katputliwala	Laxmi / Short film	Lead role
2018	Interior	Neighbor / Short film	Supporting Cast
2019	U-Turn	Sister / Short film	Supporting Cast

== Awards and nominations ==
Year	Award	Category	Title	Result	Ref
2007	Zee Rishtey Awards	The Best Bhai Behen	Rakhi – Atoot Rishtey Ki Dor	Won	
