= Cocktail 2 =

2026 Indian film by Homi Adajania

- Theatrical release poster
- Directed by: Homi Adajania
- Written by: Luv Ranjan; Tarun Jain
- Story by: Luv Ranjan
- Produced by: Dinesh Vijan; Pramita Vijan; Luv Ranjan
- Starring: Shahid Kapoor; Kriti Sanon; Rashmika Mandanna
- Cinematography: Santhana Krishnan Ravichandran
- Edited by: Akshara Prabhakar
- Music by: Pritam
- Production companies: Maddock Films; Luv Films
- Distributed by: Jio Studios
- Release date: 19 June 2026
- Running time: 150 minutes
- Country: India
- Language: Hindi
- Budget: ₹150 crore
- Box office: ₹143.60 crore

Cocktail 2 is a 2026 Indian Hindi-language romantic comedy drama film directed by Homi Adajania, co-written by Luv Ranjan and Tarun Jain, and produced by Dinesh Vijan, Luv Ranjan and Ankur Garg under Maddock Films and Luv Films. It is a spiritual sequel to Cocktail (2012) and stars Shahid Kapoor, Kriti Sanon and Rashmika Mandanna in the lead roles. Principal photography commenced in August 2025 and concluded in January 2026. The film was shot in Sicily, Delhi, and Gurugram.

Cocktail 2 was theatrically released on 19 June 2026. It received mostly negative reviews from critics and was a commercial failure. It is the 10th highest-grossing Hindi film of 2026.

== Plot ==
Kunal, a restaurant manager, and Diya, an architect, have been dating since college. Wanting to get away from relatives and family friends asking about their plans to marry, they plan a ten-day trip to Sicily. At a café, they are found by Ally, Diya's friend from college who now lives in Sicily as a dance instructor. Kunal and Diya decide to spend the trip with Ally.

When Ally asks Diya why they haven't married, Diya says that while she knows Kunal loves her, she isn't sure as to whether he truly wants to get married or whether the relationship has become a habit for him. Diya asks Ally to flirt with him during the trip to test Kunal's commitment. Ally accepts, warning Diya that she doesn't handle rejection well. Throughout the trip, Diya creates opportunities for Ally and Kunal to be alone and distances herself from Kunal, but Kunal doesn't respond to Ally's advances.

Diya falls ill and chooses to stay in Ally's home for a few days while Ally and Kunal go on a road trip. As they spend time together without Diya, Ally becomes closer to Kunal and probes him about his commitment to Diya; Kunal admits they no longer have as much fun as they did when they started dating. That night, Ally leads Kunal into the bedroom. The next morning, as Diya is due to join them, Kunal tells Ally to forget what happened the previous night. After Diya arrives, Ally tells her that nothing happened, relieving Diya. They join a wedding celebration, where Diya proposes to Kunal, who accepts, and Ally realizes she has fallen in love with him. They leave for India, inviting Ally to their wedding, but she rejects the invitation.

Months later, Ally arrives in India for the wedding and helps with the planning, staying in Kunal and Ally's house. Ally creates opportunities to subtly undermine Diya and grows closer to Kunal, which Diya notices. Ally questions Kunal about his willingness to marry and confesses that she loves him. Kunal is dumbfounded.

Ally plans bachelor and bachelorette parties to Diya's reluctance. Ally takes Diya's phone, making Diya unable to pick up Kunal's repeated calls. Ally picks up a drunken Kunal to go back to the couple's house after the party ends, and Kunal rejects Ally's suggestion that they would be better together. The next morning, Ally tells Diya about her feelings towards Kunal and challenges Diya to win over Kunal completely before the wedding. During the festivities, Diya and Kunal grow distant. Diya gives Kunal the choice to cancel the wedding if he loves Ally.

Ally's parents arrive at the wedding unexpectedly, having been invited by Diya. Incensed, she tells Kunal about Diya's plan to have her seduce him in Sicily. A hurt Kunal drives away. Diya and Ally catch up with him and stop him. Kunal admits that he had started to fall in love with Ally in Sicily, but asserts that the excitement they had on the trip cannot sustain a long-term relationship; he chooses Diya because of the relationship they have built together shaped by years of trust and comfort, telling Diya that he will not tell her what happened with Ally in her absence. Ally accepts that Kunal is not meant for her and blesses Kunal and Diya's union, reminiscing about the time she spent with Kunal, revealing that he could not bring himself to cheat on Diya. After the wedding, Ally teases Kunal, telling him she is open to marry him if his marriage to Diya doesn't work out.

== Cast ==
- Shahid Kapoor as Kunal
- Kriti Sanon as Alisha "Ally"
- Rashmika Mandanna as Diya
- Tiku Talsania as Kunal's father
- Mark Bennington as Eduardo
- Kannan Arunachalam as Diya's father
- Suparna Marwah as Diya's mother
- Neelu Kohli as Kunal's mother
- Jugal Kishore as Diya's uncle
- Shashi Bhardwaj as Diya's aunt
- Nishchay Malik as Aditya
- Deepak Kalra as Rohit
- Arun Singh as Krish
- Nadeesh Bhambi as Manav
- Ajay Madhok as Ally's father
- Sudha Menon as Ally's mother
- Pulkit Samrat as Anshul (cameo appearance)

== Production ==
Principal photography commenced in August 2025 and concluded in January 2026. Filming took place in Sicily, Italy, in October 2025, followed by a schedule in Delhi in November 2025, with primary locations including Chhatarpur and Gurgaon. On 31 January 2026, the filming was completed.

== Soundtrack ==
The soundtrack is composed by Pritam, with lyrics written by Amitabh Bhattacharya. The first single "Jab Talak" was released on 8 April 2026. The second single titled "Mashooqa", was released on 19 May 2026. The third single titled "Tujhko", was released on 25 May 2026. The fourth single titled "Vallah", was released on 9 June 2026. The fifth song "Bandhu 2.0" was a recreated version of "Tumhi Ho Bandhu" from the first film, and was released on June 17, 2026. The sixth single titled "Jag Se Laaj", was released on 20 June 2026.

== Marketing ==
The film's official trailer was released on 2 June 2026.

== Release ==
=== Theatrical ===
Cocktail 2 was theatrically released on 19 June 2026.

=== Certification ===
The film received a A 18+ certificate on 16 June 2026 by the Central Board of Film Certification (CBFC) in a total duration of 150 minutes.

=== Home media ===
The film began streaming on Netflix from 14 August 2026.

== Reception ==
=== Box office ===
Cocktail 2 opened to a strong box office response and emerged as a worldwide commercial success grossing ₹143.6 crore (US$15 million). Of this it collected ₹109.64 crore (US$12 million) gross in India and ₹33.96 crore (US$3.6 million) in overseas market.

=== Critical response ===
On the review aggregator website Rotten Tomatoes, 21% of 14 critics' reviews are positive, with an average rating of 5.10/10.

Shubhra Gupta of The Indian Express awarded the film 2.5 out of 5 stars and wrote, "Cocktail 2 coasts on glossiness and too much talkiness, overlaid with Pritam's ever-present background music. The reprise of the still-popular songs, including Tum hi ho bandhu, is flat: all emotions are underlined and overstated, just in case we missed the stuff going on between the three. Saibal Chatterjee of NDTV rated it 2.5/5 stars and said, "Adajania's directorial methods accommodate for the predilections of a new generation of filmgoers but do not let go of the emphasis on endless conversations." Sukanya Verma of rediff.com gave 2 stars out of 5, noting, "As long as its purpose of throwing everyone on the dance floor as they flaunt their toned abs in fancy clothes is served, Cocktail 2 doesn't feel obliged to make any sense." Sana Farzeen of India Today gave 2.5 stars out of 5 and remarked, "Visually, the film is stunning, and Sicily's gorgeous landscape is postcard-worthy. The songs work, the styling is fabulous, and every frame looks expensive. However, the chemistry doesn't land. Even the laughter feels so fake. And the supposedly fun moments seem forced." Rishabh Suri of Hindustan Times gave 2.5 stars out of 5, concluding, "This spiritual successor has the gloss, the glamour, but not the emotional punch. Some drinks are best served once."

BH Harsh of Cinema Express rated the film 1.5/5 stars, summing it up as, 'a film too afraid to face its own messiness.' He further added, "This is cynical, insecure, and desperate filmmaking at its best." Rahul Desai of The Hollywood Reporter India observed, "Cocktail 2 thinks it's reversing the sexism and gender roles of the two-men-fighting-for-one-woman template, but it's really just reboxing the handsome meninism of hits like Tu Jhoothi Main Makkaar, Pyaar Ka Punchnama and Sonu Ke Titu Ki Sweety. Here it's one man, two women and countless facepalms." Devesh Sharma of Filmfare gave the film 3 stars out of 5, remarking how, 'the screenplay simply doesn't allow it [chemistry between Kapoor and Sanon] to develop', unlike their 2024 film, Teri Baaton Mein Aisa Uljha Jiya, where, he writes, "they practically set the screen on fire together." Debanjan Dhar of Outlook rated the film 0.5/5 stars, writing in the epigraph of the review, "Fuelled by industrial-strength rancid misogyny, director Homi Adajania tells us to beware women and pity men, taking a leaf out of co-writer Luv Ranjan's familiar trash."
