= Aspy Adajania =

Indian sports administrator

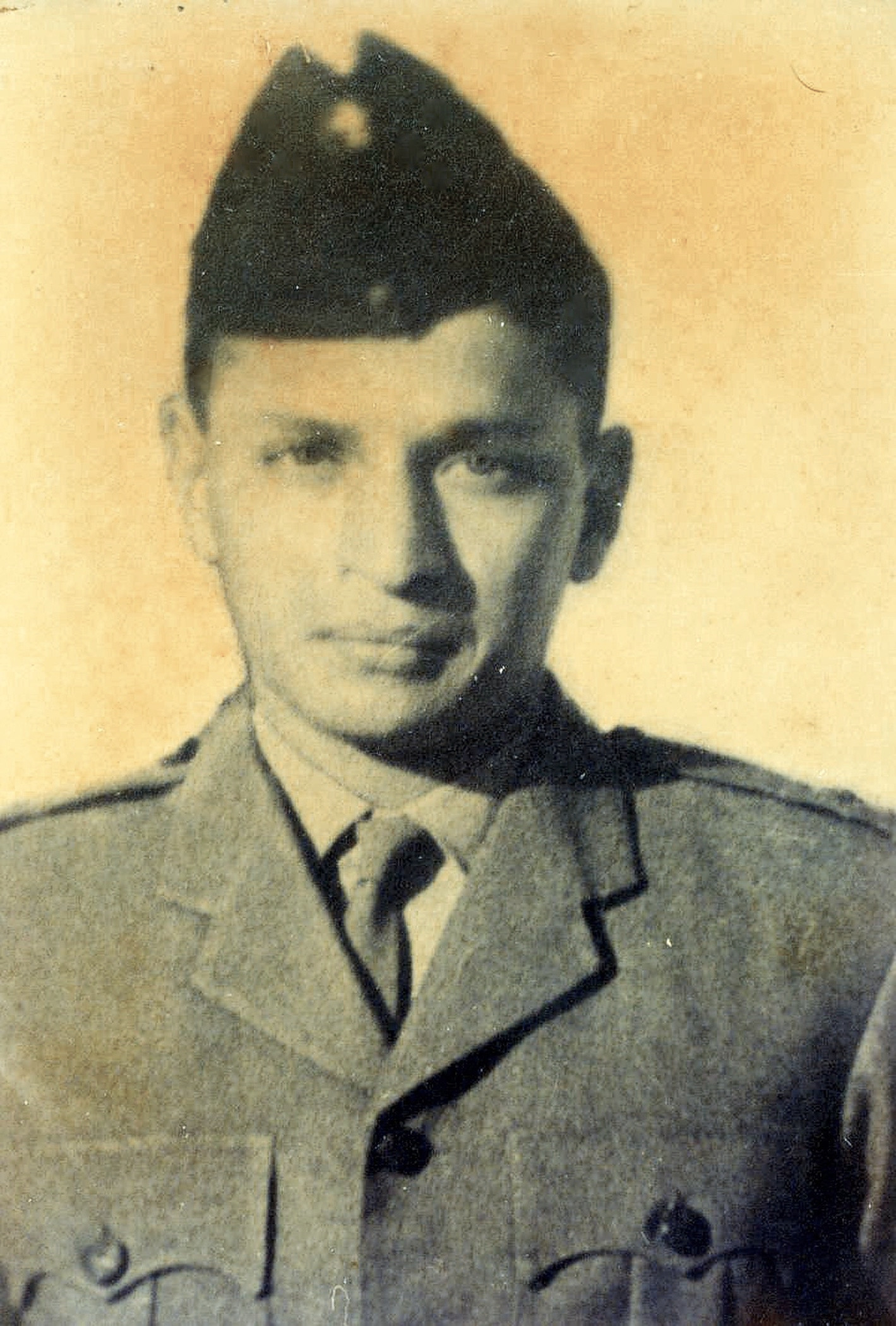
- Born: 7 May 1942; British India
- Died: 7 July 1994 (aged 52); Budapest, Hungary
- Occupations: Indian Army officer, sports administrator
- Known for: International Boxing Association Member, Indian Boxing Federation President, Bombay Boxing Association Chairman
- Spouse: Persis Adajania
- Children: Zia Adajania Divan; Homi Adajania
- Relatives: Anaita Shroff Adajania (daughter-in-law)
- Awards: Padma Shri (1992)

Aspy Adajania (1942–1994) was an Indian Army officer and boxing administrator. He served as a captain in the Indian Army Infantry; after retirement from service he became known as a pioneer in the sport of Indian amateur boxing.

== Early life and service ==
Adajania was born into a Parsi family and as indicated by his surname hailed from Adajan, a suburb of Surat in Gujarat. Soon after leaving St. Xavier's College, Bombay, Adajania joined the Indian Army on an emergency commission to fight the 1965 Indo-Pakistani War as a Captain of the 5/9 Gurkha Battalion.

== Boxing ==
Adajania was president of the Indian Amateur Boxing Federation (IABF) in 1985, 1987, 1990 and 1991 and chairman of the Bombay Boxing Association.

Adajania is credited with the development of Indian amateur boxing by bringing in Cuban boxing coach Blas Iglesias Fernandez, the first foreigner to receive the Dronacharya Award (the highest Indian coaching award), for coaching Indian boxers.

Adajania officiated over six Olympic Games (1972 Munich, 1976 Montreal, 1980 Moscow, 1984 Los Angeles, 1988 Seoul, and 1992 Barcelona). He also brought the prestigious Boxing World Cup to India at a time when international sports of this magnitude were a rarity in the country. Held at the Bombay Gymkhana, Adjania chose Boman Irani to photograph the event. Irani would later go on to become a popular actor in Indian films.

Adajania served as a member of the Executive Committee and the Grievance Committee of the International Boxing Association and was the first and only Indian to hold this honour on an international platform.

Captain Aspy Adajania died on July 17, 1994, while on assignment in Budapest, Hungary at the age of 52.

== Awards and recognition ==
The Government of India awarded him the fourth-highest civilian honour of the Padma Shri in 1992 for his relentless service to Indian sport and commitment to promoting and supporting underprivileged Indian athletes.

== Personal life ==
He was married to Persis Adajania with whom he had two children, Zia Diwan Adajania (d. 2014) and Homi Adajania. Homi is a well known director of Bollywood films and is the husband of fashion designer Anaita Shroff Adajania.

== See also ==
- Indian Boxing Federation
- International Boxing Association (AIBA)
- Surat district
