= Homi Adajania =

Indian filmmaker (born 1972)

- Born: 28 February 1972 (age 54); Bombay, Maharashtra, India
- Occupations: Film director, writer
- Years active: 2005–present
- Spouse: Anaita Shroff Adajania (m. 2002)
- Father: Aspy Adajania

Homi Adajania (born 28 February 1972) is an Indian film director and writer. He made his directorial debut with Being Cyrus (2005), an English-language psychological drama. He followed this with the commercially successful Hindi-language romantic comedy Cocktail (2012). After this Adajania directed the satire Finding Fanny.

== Career ==
Born on 28 February 1972, Adajania entered the film industry directing and co-writing the English-language psychological drama Being Cyrus (2005) starring Saif Ali Khan, Naseeruddin Shah, Dimple Kapadia, and Boman Irani. The film earned critical acclaim, despite being commercially unsuccessful. Film critic Rajeev Masand called it "a stylish thriller that's told in an immensely engaging style."

Adajania's second directorial venture was the Hindi-language romantic comedy Cocktail (2012). The film was written by filmmaker Imtiaz Ali and produced by Saif Ali Khan and Dinesh Vijan under their banner Illuminati Films. The lead roles were played by Khan, Deepika Padukone, and debutante actress Diana Penty, while Kapadia and Boman Irani featured in supporting roles. After its three-week run, Box Office India declared the film a hit in India and abroad. It earned mixed to positive reviews from critics.

Adajania's third directorial venture, the satirical comedy Finding Fanny, was released in September 2014 in both English and Hindi. The film starred an ensemble cast including Shah, Kapadia, Pankaj Kapur, Padukone, and Arjun Kapoor. The film received mostly positive reviews, and had a steady run at the box office.

His fourth directorial project was a Hindi film, Angrezi Medium, starring Irrfan Khan, Radhika Madan and Deepak Dobriyal which released on 12 March 2020 but had a limited release due to the COVID-19 pandemic.

Adajania's fifth directorial venture was an OTT series called Saas, Bahu Aur Flamingo which stars Dimple Kapadia, Radhika Madan, Angira Dhar and Isha Talwar which is about a matriarch in a rural village who runs a drug business with her daughter and her two daughters-in-law. The show streamed on 5 May 2023 with positive reviews on Disney+ Hotstar.

His sixth directorial venture is murder-mystery drama called Murder Mubarak which stars Sara Ali Khan, Vijay Varma, Dimple Kapadia, Pankaj Tripathi, Karisma Kapoor, Sanjay Kapoor, and Tisca Chopra. It is an adaptation to the best-selling novel, Club you to Death, by Anuja Chauhan . The film will be streamed on Netflix in 2024.

== Early life ==
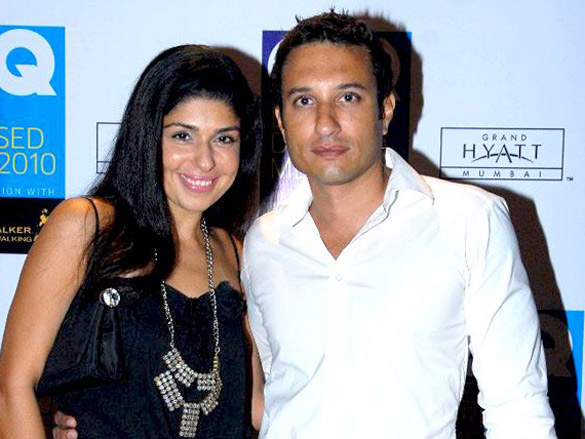
With wife Anaita Shroff Adajania at India's 50 Best Dressed Men, 2012

Adajania was born on 28 February 1972 in a Parsi family. His father, Aspy Adajania, was an Indian Army officer and a pioneer of amateur boxing in India who went on to serve as a top administrator of the sport and as a referee officiated high-profile matches. Homi lost his sister, Zia Diwan Adajania, to a stroke in 2014.

== Personal life ==
He is married to fashion stylist and the Fashion Director of Vogue India, Anaita Shroff Adajania and has two children. His sister-in-law, Scherezade Shroff - a well known YouTuber, is married to actor Vaibhav Talwar.

He played in his youth for the Bombay Gymkhana rugby football team in Mumbai. He is a certified CMAS (Confédération Mondiale des Activités Subaquatiques) dive instructor, and used to teach in the Lakshadweep islands.

== Filmography ==
=== Films ===
Year	Title	Director	Writer	Producer
2005	Being Cyrus	Yes	Yes	No
2012	Cocktail	Yes	No	No
2014	Finding Fanny	Yes	Yes	No
2017	Raabta	No	No	Yes
2019	The Fakir Of Venice	No	Story	No
2020	Angrezi Medium	Yes	No	No
2024	Murder Mubarak	Yes	No	No
2026	Cocktail 2	Yes	No	No

=== Short films ===
Year	Title	Director	Writer	Producer
2015	My Choice	Yes	Yes	Yes

=== Television ===
Year	Title	Creator	Director	Writer
2023	Saas, Bahu Aur Flamingo	Yes	Yes	Story
