= Teen Patti (film) =

2010 Indian film by Leena Yadav

- Theatrical release poster
- Directed by: Leena Yadav
- Screenplay by: Leena Yadav; Shiv Kumar Subramaniam
- Story by: Prasenjit Maita; Leena Yadav; Shiv Kumar Subramaniam
- Produced by: Ambika A. Hinduja
- Starring: Amitabh Bachchan; Ben Kingsley; R. Madhavan; Shraddha Kapoor; Raima Sen; Tinnu Anand; Mahesh Manjrekar
- Cinematography: Aseem Bajaj
- Edited by: Hughes Winborne; Kaushik Das
- Music by: Salim–Sulaiman
- Production companies: Hinduja Ventures; Serendipity Films
- Distributed by: Serendipity Films
- Release date: 26 February 2010
- Running time: 140 minutes
- Country: India
- Languages: Hindi; English
- Budget: ₹18 crore
- Box office: ₹7.63 crore

Teen Patti (transl. Three cards) is a 2010 Indian Hindi-language action thriller film directed by Leena Yadav. It stars Amitabh Bachchan, Ben Kingsley, R. Madhavan, Raima Sen and Shraddha Kapoor, in her acting debut. The film is produced by Ambika Hinduja under the banners of Hinduja Ventures and Serendipity Films. The film follows a mathematics professor, played by Bachchan, who is trying to write a thesis on probability and relates it to the Indian card game Teen Patti.

== Plot ==
Venkat Subramaniam (Amitabh Bachchan), an Indian professor of mathematics, software engineering and a genius, is teaching mathematics in his village to kids when a postman comes with a letter. The letter is from British mathematician Perci Trachtenberg (Ben Kingsley), widely regarded as the world's greatest living mathematician, who invites Venkat to a high rolling casino in London. Venkat tells Perci about an equation that could not only change the dialogue on mathematics forever, but one that has already left an indelible impression of guilt — for many painful reasons — on Venkat's life. It is shown in the past that the reclusive genius Venkat has cracked a theory that could redefine the principles of probability and randomness. Venkat tries to use this experiment in a game called Teen Patti (a poker game), which he plays on the Internet. According to this experiment if a person playing Teen Patti knows the three cards with one of the players (except him) he/she can guess the other cards with the rest of the players and therefore can guess who is going to win with the theory of probability.

Venkat succeeds in his theory and submits his report to the institute where he teaches, but they reject his report. Venkat is sure about his theory and wants to try it out in reality with live players. So he talks with younger professor Shantanu Biswas (R. Madhavan) about his theory and tells him to get three students to try out this experiment. Shantanu arranges three students — Sid (Siddharth Kher), the college rockstar; Aparna or Apu (Shraddha Kapoor), the studious geek, who has a crush on Sid, and Vikram or Vikku (Dhruv Ganesh), the boy next door. They come together and start playing the game. Venkat's theory, like the last time, proves to be successful. Venkat says that after a few more games he'll be sure to crack his equation and even be able to study it better. Shantanu tells him that he should try using his theory in the real world, where there are people who actually gamble and play Teen Patti, i.e. in underground dens or "addas".

Although Venkat has no interest in the money that could come from practicing his equation to crack Teen Patti, he eventually succumbs to Shantanu's charismatic persuasion. Soon, with the help of his new students, they explore the addas of wild Mumbai. Later, another student from the institute, Abbas (Vaibhav Talwar), the rich, spoiled brat, joins the gang and arranges for them parties in casinos, private clubs, etc. But what starts out as an experiment between a charismatic young professor and an eccentric older one soon descends into a game neither of them can control. The money they earn gets stolen; someone is blackmailing them; they get greedy about money, and, over time, they change into different people and even start betraying each other.

== Cast ==
- Amitabh Bachchan as Prof. Venkat Subramaniam
- Ben Kingsley as Perci Trachtenberg (voice dubbed by Boman Irani)
- R. Madhavan as Prof. Shantanu Biswas
- Dhruv Ganesh as Vikram Ashwin Dhar
- Ashu Sharma as Rammi
- Shraddha Kapoor as Aparna Khanna (Apu)
- Siddharth Kher as Siddharth Bajaj (Sid)
- Vaibhav Talwar as Abbas Sheikh
- Saira Mohan as K.
- Raima Sen as Shivani Mukherjee
- Ajay Devgn as Sunny (Cameo appearance)
- Jackie Shroff as Tony Milano (Special Appearance)
- Mahesh Manjrekar as Dagdu Seth
- Ranjeet
- Shakti Kapoor as Prem London (Cameo appearance)
- Tinnu Anand as Billu
- Radhika Shah as Card Dealer
- Ganesh Yadav as Police Inspector
- Maria Gomez as item number "Neeyat"
- Cristobal Briceño as surprised student at the end scene

== Music ==
Teen Patti

Studio album by Salim–Sulaiman
- Released: 2010
- Genre: Feature film soundtrack
- Label: T-Series

Salim–Sulaiman chronology
Pyaar Impossible (2010)	Teen Patti (2010)	Aashayein (2010)

Music of the film is composed by Salim–Sulaiman and the lyrics are penned by Ajinkya Iyer and Irfan Siddiqui. Most of the tracks have a western feel associated with them. The songs are remixed by Abhijit Vaghani. Sunidhi Chauhan's rendition of the song Neeyat Kharab Hai was widely acclaimed.

#	Title	Singer(s)
1	"Life Is A Game" (Hindi Version)	Anushka Manchanda & Sonia Saigal
2	"Summertime And The Living"	Joe Alvares
3	"Teen Patti Ke Gulaam"	Salim Merchant
4	"Neeyat Kharab Hai"	Sunidhi Chauhan
5	"Intezar Me Chupa Kahi"	Naresh Kamat
6	"Life Is A Game" (English Version)	Anushka Manchanda & Sonia Saigal
7	"Neeyat Kharab Hai" (Remix)	Sunidhi Chauhan & Abhijit Vaghani
8	"Teen Patti Ke Gulaam" (Remix)	Salim Merchant

== Production ==
The film was shot in India and England. Production designer Ayesha Punvani created gambling dens in places like abandoned train yards, dockyards, abandoned factories, mills that have been shut down and an ice factory.

== Reception ==
Film critic and author Anupama Chopra called it "a train wreck of a movie".

== Influences ==
Teen Patti is inspired by the English film 21 (without any mention). The end of the film when Amitabh Bachchan refuses to accept the Isaac Newton Award for Applied Mathematics is inspired by the refusal of the Fields Medal by the Russian mathematician Grigori Perelman.
