= Parched =

2015 film

- Film poster
- Directed by: Leena Yadav
- Written by: Leena Yadav
- Produced by: Ajay Devgn; Aseem Bajaj; Gulab Singh Tanwar; Leena Yadav; Rohan Jagdale
- Starring: Tannishtha Chatterjee; Radhika Apte; Surveen Chawla; Adil Hussain; Lehar Khan; Sayani Gupta
- Cinematography: Russell Carpenter
- Edited by: Kevin Tent
- Music by: Hitesh Sonik
- Production companies: Seville International; Reliance Entertainment; Ajay Devgn FFilms; Shivalaya Entertainment; Blue Waters Motion Pictures; Airan Consultants; Ashlee Films; Marlylebone Entertainment
- Distributed by: Seville International; Reliance Entertainment
- Release dates: 12 September 2015 (TIFF); 23 September 2016 (India)
- Running time: 118 minutes
- Country: India
- Language: Hindi
- Budget: US$2.7 million
- Box office: ₹12.03 crore (US$1.79 million)

Parched is a 2015 Indian drama film written and directed by Leena Yadav and produced by Ajay Devgan under his banner Ajay Devgn FFilms. It premiered at the Special Presentations section of the 2015 Toronto International Film Festival. In India, the film was released on 23 September 2016.

== Plot ==
Parched is the story of four women in a desert village of Rajasthan, India. The village and the society are plagued by several social evils, age-old traditions and practices of patriarchy, child marriage, dowry, marital rapes and physical and mental abuse.

Rani is a widow struggling to support her old mother-in-law and teenage son, Gulab. Following village customs, Rani marries Gulab off to a child bride by paying a hefty sum to the bride's family. Meanwhile, Gulab is disrespectful, rebellious, and prefers to loiter with a gang of friends, spending time with sex workers. Janki, the child bride, hopes to stop the marriage by chopping off her hair but is still forced into the relation. Lajjo lives in the same village as Rani, and is a close friend and aid in Rani's struggles. Lajjo is in an abusive marriage with an alcoholic husband, Manoj. Having failed to conceive, Lajjo is mocked for being infertile and therefore worthless in the eyes of her husband and society. The fourth woman is Bijli, an erotic dancer in a travelling entertainment company. Bijli acts as an advisor to both Rani and Lajjo.

The movie begins with Rani and Lajjo visiting another village to meet Janki and her family. Meanwhile, Gulab and his friends are seen harassing an educated, working woman, until her husband, Kishan (Sumeet Vyas) approaches. While at Janki's house, Rani receives calls on a cell phone given to her by Gulab. The anonymous calls started off as a wrong number but developed into coy flirting.

Later, at the Gram Panchayat, the village participates in solving local issues. The first issue is of a girl named Champa who ran away from her husband and tried to return to her parents. The Panchayat forces her to return despite her revelation that her husband's male family members all rape her. Kishan and his wife try intervening but are ridiculed for their progressive opinions. Kishan is a forward thinking local entrepreneur and employs women in the village for craft and handloom jobs. The women reveal at the Panchayat that Kishan has secured a large contract for their handicrafts and so they are prepared to save money for the installation of televisions. The elders reluctantly agree and this angers some men in the village, including Gulab, who resent Kishan for trying to liberate the women.

The conservative and patriarchal village men are seen to be constantly visiting Bijli. She has been increasingly turning down offers for sex work which irks her boss, who threatens to replace her with a new younger girl Rekha (Tanya Sachdeva). Gulab's unhappy marriage exacerbates his anger issues and poor attitude towards women. Janki is repeatedly beaten and raped by Gulab. After being threatened by a pimp, Gulab and his friends take out their anger on Kishan. First they destroy his handicraft goods, and later on they violently beat him, prompting Kishan and his wife to leave the village.

Frustrated, Bijli picks up Rani, Lajjo and Janki, and visit a local fort. Lajjo realizes that her husband, not her, may be the infertile one. In an experiment, Lajjo has sex with Bijli's lover and becomes pregnant. Bijli returns to the company to find that her dancing spot has been given to Rekha. She resorts to engaging in traumatic rough sex with multiple men in order to make money.

Rani discovers that Gulab has stolen her last bit of savings and confronts him. He attacks Janki and then angrily walks away, leaving the women to fend for themselves. The next day, Rani sells her house and pays off her debts. She relieves Janki of her marriage, allowing her to reunite with her childhood sweetheart and continue with her studies. Lajjo informs Manoj of her pregnancy and he begins to beat her, implying that he was aware of his infertility. He accidentally falls onto a fire and is severely burnt, while Lajjo watches. Rani, Lajjo and Bijli finally decide to run away from the village in search for a better life, away from all the misery of customs, traditions and patriarchy. Casting for the film was handled by Mukesh Chhabra and Vicky Kisan Mourya.

== Cast ==
- Tannishtha Chatterjee as Rani
- Radhika Apte as Lajjo
- Surveen Chawla as Bijli
- Adil Hussain as mystic lover
- Sumeet Vyas as Kishan
- Lehar Khan as Janki, Gulab's wife
- Riddhi Sen as Gulab, Rani's son
- Sayani Gupta as Champa
- Prince Gehlot as Gulab's friend

== Reception ==
=== Box office ===
The film failed to have significant box office collections after its release in India. The film grossed ₹12.03 crore (US$1.79 million) worldwide, including ₹1.98 crore (US$294,663) in India and ₹10.05 crore (US$1.5 million) in other markets. It was most successful in France, where it grossed $1,072,253, from 160,379 ticket sales, the fourth highest for an Indian film, after Salaam Bombay, The Lunchbox, and Jalsaghar. Parched also grossed €235,223 ($264,058) in Spain.

=== Critical response ===
The film received critical acclaim. On review aggregation website Rotten Tomatoes, Parched has an approval score of 90% on the basis of 21 reviews with an average rating of 7.4 out of 10.

Meena Iyer from The Times of India rated the film 4.5 out 5 stars, and mentioned that Parched "takes you into a disturbing and thought-provoking territory". Anupama Chopra of Hindustan Times gave the film a rating of 3 out of 5 saying that, "The larger narrative of the film is inert and clunky but the spirited female characters will stay with you." Saibal Chatterjee of NDTV gave the film a rating of 4 out of 5 saying that, "Leena Yadav's Parched is an irresistible beast of a film. As incendiary as it is entertaining, it goes where Indian cinema rarely does without becoming exploitative - into the erogenous fantasies of long-suppressed village women who are no longer willing to countenance their restrictive veils." Shubhra Gupta of The Indian Express gave the film a rating of 2 out of 5 saying that, "Radhika Apte, Surveen Chawla and Tannishtha Chatterjee's film is failed by too much violence and unnecessary gloss." The Hindu criticized the film saying that, "Parched is an unconvincing indictment of patriarchy that feels staged." and gave the film a rating of 2 out of 5. Suparna Sharma of Deccan Chronicle gave the film a rating of 2.5 out of 5 saying that, "Parched feels like it’s unsettled, struggling between wanting to tell a real story, but also keen on concocting a fairytale happy-ending."

Rajeev Masand of News18 gave the film a rating of 3 out of 5 and called it an "entertaining ride" but also wished that "Yadav didn't tar all the men in the village with the same brush, except for a couple of characters here and there." Aseem Chhabra of Rediff praised the acting performances of Tannishtha Chatterjee and Radhika Apte and said gave the film a rating of 3.5 out of 5 saying that, "under Yadav's able guidance, Parched genuinely shines." Katie Walsh of Los Angeles Times praised the film saying that, "Leena Yadav's "Parched" is a bright jewel of a film, surprisingly funny, fresh and upbeat in the way it takes on the complicated and often dark topic of sexual politics in rural India." Alissa Wilkinson of Roger Ebert gave the film a rating of 3 out of 4 saying that, "Parched" is vibrantly alive, full of color and light and movement and music. There is sex in this movie, and there is dancing, and there are vibrant fabrics and foods and fire. It's a dry place, but one ringed with beauty." Justin Lowe of The Hollywood Reporter reviewed the film saying that Parched is "Well-intentioned, but wide of the mark." Sweta Kausal of Hindustan Times stated that the film is important because it tries to celebrate the long struggle against unjust system of forced patriarchy. Glenn Kenny from The New York Times mentioned that "the movie’s plain and unstinting affection for its lead characters gives Parched a frequently buoyant tone."

=== Accolades ===
Year	Name of Competition	Category	Result	Recipients
2016	10th Asia Pacific Screen Awards	Best Screenplay	Nominated	Leena Yadav, Supratik Sen
2016	Indian Film Festival of Melbourne	Best Director	Won	Leena Yadav
2016	Toulouse Indian Film Festival	Audience Best Film Award	Won	Parched/La Saison des femmes
