= Mukhtiyar Ali =

Folk singer from Rajasthan, India

Mukhtiyar Ali is a folk singer from Bikaner in the Indian state of Rajasthan. He belongs to semi-nomadic community of Mirasi, who are known for their oral tradition of Sufi singing. The men in Ali's family have been Sufi musicians for many generations. Ali is a popular singer of the poetry of Kabir, and Mirabai, as well as Sufi poets such as Bulleh Shah. He was covered by the Kabir Project, as part of the movie 'Had Anhad' after which he gained lot of popularity. He made his international debut in July 2007. Mukhtiyar Ali has also since then sang songs for many movies. He was awarded the GiMA Award for Best Music Debut for the year 2015 for the song 'Fanny Re' in the movie Finding Fanny. He collaborated with Mathias Duplessy to write his music for the film.
