= Enkhjargal Dandarvaanchig =

Mongolian musician

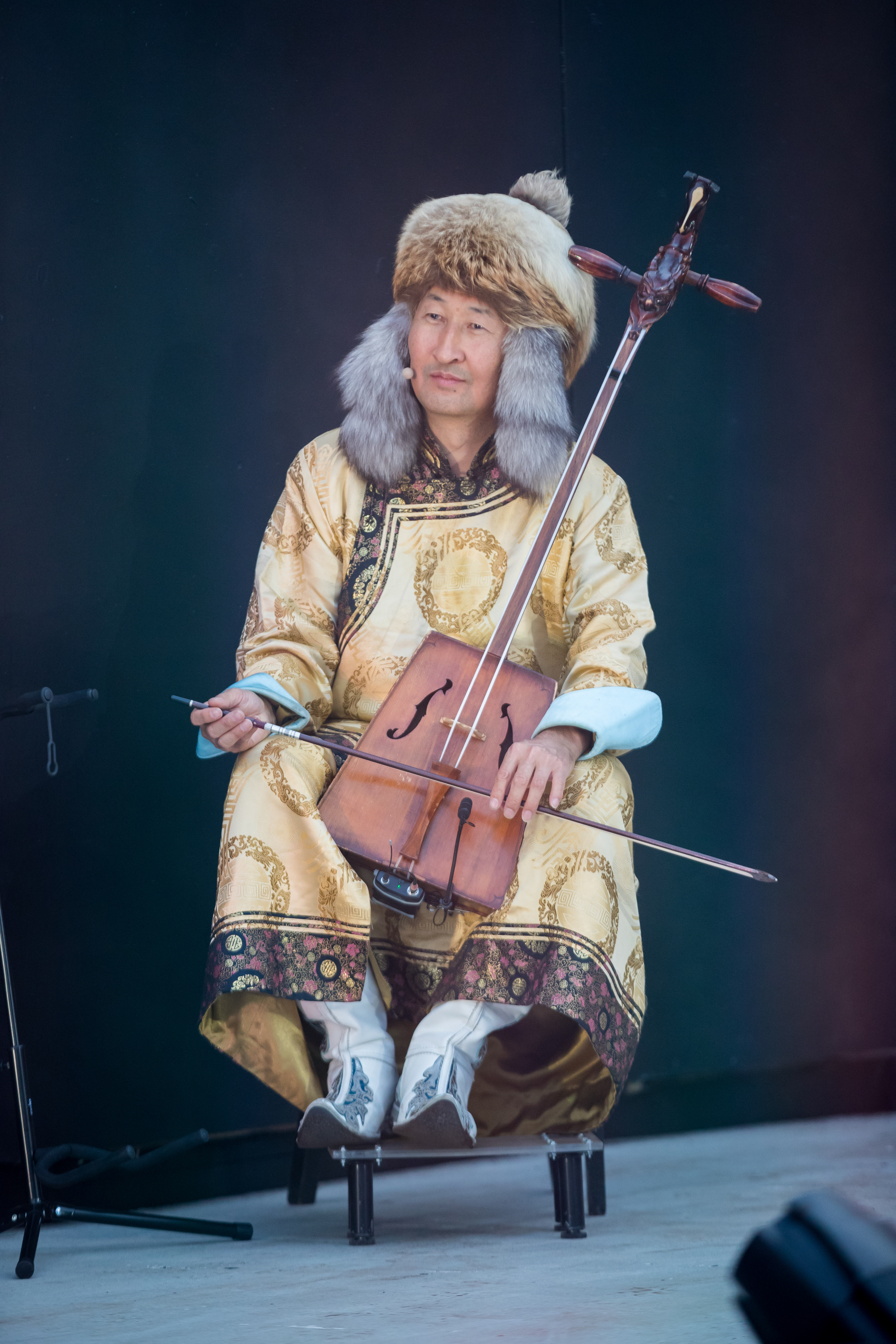
Performing at Nibelung Festival, Worms, 2018

Enkhjargal Dandarvaanchig (Mongolian: Дандарваанчигийн Энхжаргал, born 1968, Ulaanbaatar), also known as Epi, is a Mongolian musician, overtone singer, and Morin khuur player. He works in the style of fusion between modern and traditional music.

== Discography ==
- 2002: Hoirr öngoö, Solo
- 2010: Violons Barbares, with Violons Barbares
- 2014: Saulem Ai, with Violons Barbares
- 2016: Crazy Horse, with Mathias Duplessy
- 2017: Souffles des steppes, with Henri Tournier
- 2018: Wolf's Cry, with Violons Barbares
- 2019: Setgeliin gunii tsuurai, Solo
- 2023: Monsters And Fantastic Creatures, with Violons Barbares
