= Rajma Chawal =

2018 film directed by Leena Yadav

- Release poster
- Directed by: Leena Yadav
- Screenplay by: Vivek Anchalia; Manu Rishi Chadha (also dialogues); Leena Yadav
- Story by: Vivek Anchalia
- Produced by: Leena Yadav; Aseem Bajaj; Gulab Singh Tanwar
- Starring: Rishi Kapoor; Anirudh Tanwar; Amyra Dastur; Sheeba Chaddha; Aparshakti Khurana; Diksha Juneja
- Cinematography: Donald McAlpine
- Edited by: Thom Noble
- Music by: Hitesh Sonik
- Production company: SaarthiE Entertainment
- Distributed by: Netflix
- Release date: 30 November 2018
- Running time: 129 minutes
- Country: India
- Language: Hindi

Rajma Chawal (transl. Red kidney beans rice) is a 2018 Hindi-language Indian comedy-drama film directed by Leena Yadav, produced by Gulab Singh Tanwar and Aseem Bajaj, which stars Rishi Kapoor, Anirudh Tanwar and Amyra Dastur in the lead. The film revolves around a father-son relationship in today's time. The film was released by Netflix on 30 November 2018.

== Plot ==
Raj Mathur (Rishi Kapoor) and his son Kabir move from their New Delhi house back to the family's old house in Chandni Chowk after Kabir's mother dies in an accident. Kabir, a guitar player, is unhappy with the move and resent his dad for forcing him to leave his friends, his band and the house with the memories of his mother. Raj hides his troubles explains that he wants to shift in with his old friends. Kabir accuses his dad and becomes more withdrawn from his dad, and the two start shouting and fighting with each other.

Raj is troubled by the lack of any communication between them. He decides to join Facebook to connect with his son, only to be blocked by Kabir. At Beeji's suggestion, he steals the identity of a girl disconnected from Facebook and pretends to be "Tara" to talk to his son.

Meanwhile, Tara's real-life persona Seher (Amyra Dastur) is a salon girl constantly borrowing money from her abusive boyfriend Baljeet to stay afloat. She is exploited by her boyfriend and running away from him since he is abusive, but she returns due to her financial situation.

Kabir realizes that his dad, too, has suffered a grievous loss of his partner after his mother's death. Kabir opens his heart to Tara (in reality, his father) on Facebook, and she, in turn, shares the father's feelings with Kabir. He becomes closer to Tara and also becomes closer to his father. He meets new friends, starts a new band and even writes a new song from the poem "Tara's dad" (in reality, his own father) wrote for "Tara's mom" (in reality, Kabir's mom). His band gets a chance for a live performance at a popular joint, and he visits his New Delhi house to pay tribute to his mom. There he learns that the house has been sold & he becomes angry that his dad did not tell him. The band's performance is a success, and he sees Seher, who kisses him to get away from her possessive boyfriend, after which she leaves. Confused and angry, he leaves his father's home to stay with his friend and is determined to find "Tara", and he messages her on Facebook.

His father Raj has seen Seher too and thinks the game is up, but he finds the real "Tara" Seher and convinces her to pretend to be Tara and coax his son back home with his friends. Incidentally, Seher is attracted to Kabir after meeting him but is scared to fall in love because of her history. He impresses her, and she falls for him.

As the relationship progresses, Seher and Kabir are together. Seher discloses that she was an obedient daughter till she became pregnant with her boyfriend's baby. She stole money from her house and gave it to him, but he dumped her, ran to Canada and left her estranged from her small-town conservative family in Meerut. She ran away to Delhi, got an abortion and started living single. She wants to go to Meerut, but her parents deny her. She goes with Kabir to celebrate Diwali with his father Raj, and they end up making out in her rented flat.

The next day she secretly meets Raj, who asks her to end the relationship. Seher tells him she has fallen in love with Kabir, but Raj calls her a fraud and insults her while saying she is very different from Kabir. She breaks up with Kabir and starts working hard in the Salon to pay back her debts. Heartbroken, Kabir returns to his father Raj, who asks him to concentrate on his music. Seeing Kabir, Beeji and Raj's friend try to persuade him to help Kabir with Seher, but he insults and rebuffs them.

Unable to sing, a depressed Kabir avoids his band and is not going to band events, leading to his music career suffering. His father pretends to have a heart attack and is taken to hospital by a distraught Kabir. Kabir is furious with his father's constant deception & lies and runs away. Upon returning home, Seher is spotted by Kabir returning his dad's money, and she runs away while Raj's friend gives Kabir the truth.

Raj and his friends go to the girls' hostel to find Seher, where she is staying after clearing the landlord's debt, hoping that she can help find Kabir or know where he is. Using an app, they trace Kabir to a Metro Station, where his father finally has an honest conversation, opening up for the first time. Raj tells Kabir that his mother covered her injuries to ensure that Kabir's exam next day is unaffected. He comes clean about his Facebook deception and other lies, admitting that whatever he did was out of love with the intention to come closer to his son; the two eventually hug. Raj tells Kabir that he has realized that Seher is a wonderful girl and he should go after her and get her back.

Kabir finds Seher, and then they get back together as Kabir's band continues to play in the background. Kabir's band is successful; Seher goes with Kabir to Meerut and reconciles with her family; Seher lives with Kabir in Chandni Chowk, while he sings that his heart and soul belongs in Chandni Chowk. After the performance, Kabir looks at the pigeons and leaves to spend time with Seher and his family and friends.

== Cast ==
- Rishi Kapoor as Raj Mathur
- Anirudh Tanwar as Kabir Mathur
  - Vedant Sinha as Young Kabir
- Amyra Dastur as Tara "Seher" Chaudhary
- Nirmal Rishi as Beeji (Bebe)
- Aparshakti Khurana as Baljeet Singh Chautala
- Harish Khanna as Kuljeet
- Sheeba Chaddha as Kabir's Aunt
- Manu Rishi as Mittal
- Jeetu Shastri as Anees
- Diksha Juneja as Paro
- Akash Dabas as Sanju
- Raja Hasan as Jacky Jam (Singer/Musician)
- Mukesh Chhabra as Anoop Ji
- Brijendra Kalaas Dr. Vedaprkash ( Dheela)
- Adil Hussain

== Music ==
Rajma Chawal

Soundtrack album by Hitesh Sonik
- Released: 2018
- Genre: Feature film soundtrack

The film music and score were composed by Hitesh Sonik, while the lyrics were written by Irshad Kamil.

No.	Title	Lyrics	Music	Singer(s)	Length
1.	"Yaariyan"	Irshad Kamil	Hitesh Sonik	Arijit Singh, Amit Mishra	4:00
2.	"Kahani"	Irshad Kamil	Hitesh Sonik	Sunidhi Chauhan
3.	"Ha ha he"	Irshad Kamil	Hitesh Sonik	Mohit Chauhan
4.	"Bemaani"	Irshad Kamil	Hitesh Sonik	Amit Mishra
5.	"Goliyaan"	Irshad Kamil	Hitesh Sonik	Amit Mishra
6.	"Saath Tere"	Irshad Kamil	Hitesh Sonik	Sunidhi Chauhan
7.	"Paas Aao"	Irshad Kamil	Hitesh Sonik	Amit Mishra
Total length:					18:09

== Release ==
Rajma Chawal premiered at the BFI London Film Festival in October 2018, and was released on Netflix on 30 November.
