= Leena Yadav =

Indian director, producer, editor

- Born: 6 January 1971 (age 55)
- Education: Sophia College for Women
- Occupations: Film director, producer, editor and screenwriter
- Spouse: Aseem Bajaj
- Relatives: Ram Gopal Bajaj (father-in-law)

Leena Yadav (born 6 January 1971) is an Indian film director, producer, screenwriter and editor. She started her career in the television industry and gradually moved on to making feature films. Her first international feature film, Parched, premiered at the Toronto International Film Festival in 2015.

== Early life and education ==
Born to an Indian Army general in Madhya Pradesh, she graduated with Economics honours from Lady Shri Ram College for Women, Delhi. She did Mass Communications from Sophia College for Women, Mumbai.

== Personal life ==
She is married to Aseem Bajaj (son of Ram Gopal Bajaj and maternal grandson of Khemchand Prakash), who is an Indian cinematographer and film producer well known for his poetic imagery on films like Hazaaron Khwaishein Aisi, Shabd, Teen Patti, U Me Aur Hum and Chameli to name a few. She met Aseem while directing her first TV show This Week That Year.

== Filmography ==
Having captivated by the job of Film editing, while she was working with a diploma in Mass Communications background, she learned Film editing. Without working as an assistant to anyone, she learned about direction and script writing from editing itself. While working as an editor for 'ad films' – corporate shows – and television serials, she got an offer to direct a Television (TV) show This Week That Year for Star Movies. With success, she floated her own production house with Nikhil Kapoor to produce and direct shows for Star Bestsellers.

As a TV director, she directed both fiction and non-fiction for almost 12 years; some of the TV shows that she directed included singular episodes for Star Bestsellers, Say Na Something to Anupam Uncle, Sanjeevani, and many more.

As a mainstream film director, Shabd was her directorial debut with unconventional storyline, released in 2005. Teen Patti was her second film after a gap of five years. Parched is the latest movie directed by her, starring Tannishtha Chatterjee, Radhika Apte, Surveen Chawla and Adil Hussain playing lead roles.

=== As director ===
Films

Year	Film	Director	Writer	Producer	Editor	Note
2000	Dead End	Yes	Yes	Yes	Yes	TV movie; also Composer
2005	Shabd	Yes	Yes	No	Yes	
2009	Thank You for Now	No	No	No	Yes	Short film
2010	Teen Patti	Yes	Yes	No	No	
2015	Parched	Yes	Yes	Yes	No	
2018	Rajma Chawal	Yes	Yes	Yes	No	

TV show

- This Week That Year – for Star Movies.
- Say Na Something to Anupam Uncle.
- Sanjeevani.
- Goonj – for Sony TV.
- Kahin Na Kahi Koi Ha – a match-making show with Madhuri Dixit.
- Temptation Island.
- Dead End.
- Khauf

Documentary

- House of Secrets: The Burari Deaths (2021)
