= Being Cyrus =

2005 Indian film by Homi Adajania

- Theatrical release poster
- Directed by: Homi Adajania
- Written by: Homi Adajania
- Produced by: Homi Adajania; Dinesh Vijan; Ambika Hinduja; Vineet Jain; AP. Pairagi
- Starring: Saif Ali Khan; Naseeruddin Shah; Dimple Kapadia; Boman Irani; Simone Singh
- Cinematography: Jehangir Choudhary
- Edited by: Jon Harris
- Music by: Salim–Sulaiman
- Production companies: Miracle Cinefilms; Serendipity Films; Times Infotainment Media Limited
- Distributed by: PVR Pictures
- Release dates: 8 November 2005 (Lyon Asiexpo Film Festival); 24 March 2006 (India)
- Running time: 83 minutes
- Country: India
- Language: English
- Budget: ₹40 million
- Box office: ₹46 million

Being Cyrus is a 2005 Indian English-language dark comedy film directed by Homi Adajania. The film revolves around a dysfunctional Parsi family. The film was originally titled Akoori, a reference to a traditional Parsi scrambled eggs-like side dish. The film is the directorial debut of Homi Adajania and Saif Ali Khan's first film in English. Upon its release, the film was reported to be released in a Hindi dubbed version in 2007, however, the director cancelled the plan.

== Plot ==
The plot is sometimes narrated from the perspective of Cyrus Mistry.

Dinshaw Sethna is a retired sculptor who lives with his wife Katy in Panchgani. Dinshaw's brother Farrokh, their father Fardoonjee, and Farrokh's wife Tina reside in Mumbai.

Cyrus Mistry, a wanderer hailing from Jamshedpur, arrives at Dinshaw's house one morning. He professes his admiration for Dinshaw's work and asks if he can become a sculpting apprentice. Dinshaw and Katy agree, and soon the young man becomes a part of their life. Katy makes sexual advances towards Cyrus, which he tolerates, while cryptically telling the audience that he is "playing Katy". As time passes Cyrus gets to know the oddball couple better – Dinshaw is an affable, perpetually zoned-out eccentric, while the promiscuous Katy, tired of slow-moving Panchgani life and her marriage, has embarked on an affair with her brother-in-law Farrokh in Mumbai. Katy makes Cyrus her pawn, sending him to Mumbai to visit her father-in-law Fardoonjee, who lives in an extension of Farrokh's flat, with orders to get a stash of money Fardoonjee supposedly has. On meeting Fardoonjee, Cyrus realizes that he is ill-treated by Farrokh. Farrokh's timid young wife, Tina, is unable to be herself except during the few hours Farrokh is at work. She enjoys smoking, loud music and goes to beauty appointments when Farrokh is gone.

Katy convinces Cyrus to murder both Fardoonjee and Tina, so that she can be with Farrokh. Unknown to Cyrus, Farrokh plans to kill him after the deed to close the loose end. Cyrus arrives at a time when Tina is coincidentally out for a waxing appointment. He meets with Fardoonjee and feeds him his favorite food before stabbing him to death immediately afterwards. Cyrus implies to the audience that he actually mercy killed Fardoonjee, to release him from his wretched life. Farrokh sneaks into the house but Cyrus kills him first. When Katy calls to check on Farrokh, Cyrus picks up the phone and tells her that her plan has failed. Cyrus then vanishes.

Katy and Dinshaw are taken by the police for interrogation. She constantly blames Cyrus for the murders, but the police find no evidence of any person named Cyrus existing in Panchgani. Katy and Dinshaw are arrested for the murders, while Tina is sent home after being told that she was lucky to be away at that time.

A few months later, Tina is in her apartment when Cyrus arrives. Apparently, he has come to finish the last murder. Instead, the pair embrace and it is revealed that they are actually siblings and Cyrus's actual name is revealed to be Xerxes. The murders are shown to be an elaborate plot concocted by Tina to inherit the Sethna property. With Fardoonjee and Farrokh dead, and Katy and Dinshaw incarcerated, the plan has succeeded. While Tina is showering, Cyrus sees a newspaper where Tina has marked another prominent, wealthy family for this scheme. Unwilling to participate in this murderous scheme any further, Cyrus flees with their stolen money, leaving Tina alone.

== Cast ==
- Saif Ali Khan as Cyrus Mistry / Xerxes
- Naseeruddin Shah as Dinshaw Sethna
- Dimple Kapadia as Katy Sethna
- Boman Irani as Farrokh Sethna
- Simone Singh as Tina Sethna
- Honey Chhaya as Fardoonjee Sethna
- Manoj Pahwa as Senior Inspector Maninder Singh Lovely

== Reception ==
The film received mostly positive reviews from critics. Rajeev Masand rated the film 3 out of 5, praising the performances and story. The Times of India rated the film 3.5 out of 5. Anupama Chopra from India Today termed the film as a "competent, well-crafted debut." Indrani Roy Mitra from Rediff.com rated the film 3 out of 5, terming it as "a unique attempt".

Poonam Joshi from BBC rated the film 3 out of 5, terming it as "The emphasis here is on strong storytelling and riveting visuals, making for a curiously original film."

== Awards ==
At the 52nd Filmfare Awards held in 2007, Being Cyrus received 7 nominations, all in the technical categories. This was the most number of nominations for a film that did not win any awards. At the 2nd Global Indian Film Awards, the film received 3 nominations; 2 for Adajania and 1 for Kapadia.
