= Cocktail (2012 film) =

2012 Indian film by Homi Adajania

- Theatrical release poster
- Directed by: Homi Adajania
- Written by: Imtiaz Ali
- Produced by: Saif Ali Khan; Dinesh Vijan
- Starring: Saif Ali Khan; Deepika Padukone; Diana Penty; Dimple Kapadia; Boman Irani; Randeep Hooda
- Cinematography: Anil Mehta
- Edited by: A. Sreekar Prasad
- Music by: Songs: Pritam; Score: Salim–Sulaiman; Guest Composition: Yo Yo Honey Singh
- Production companies: Illuminati Films; Maddock Films
- Distributed by: Eros International
- Release date: July 13, 2012 (India)
- Running time: 144 minutes
- Country: India
- Language: Hindi
- Box office: ₹122.99 crore

Cocktail is a 2012 Indian Hindi-language romantic comedy drama film written by Imtiaz Ali, directed by Homi Adajania, and produced by Saif Ali Khan and Dinesh Vijan under their respective banners Illuminati Films and Maddock Films. It stars Saif Ali Khan, Deepika Padukone and Diana Penty, in her acting debut. The film's soundtrack was composed by Pritam and Yo Yo Honey Singh.

Cocktail was released on 13 July 2012 and received mixed to positive reviews from critics. It emerged as a commercial success, grossing ₹126 crore worldwide, to rank as one of the highest grossing Hindi films of 2012. At the 58th Filmfare Awards, Cocktail received four nominations including Best Actress (Padukone) and Best Female Debut (Penty).

A spiritual sequel titled Cocktail 2 starring Shahid Kapoor, Kriti Sanon and Rashmika Mandanna was released on 19 June 2026 with Adajania returning as the director.

== Plot ==
Meera Sahni (Diana Penty) is a shy and traditional Indian girl who leaves her family in India to live in London with her husband Kunal Ahuja (Randeep Hooda). While at the Heathrow Airport, she meets Gautam Kapoor (Saif Ali Khan), a shameless flirt and playboy who hits on her and asks her out. Meera, disturbed by his over-extroverted behaviour, politely tells him that she is married and then leaves. Meera searches for Kunal and finally finds him, but he is angry to see her and explains that he only married Meera for money, telling her to stay away from him. This leaves Meera heartbroken and stranded in London with no place to stay. While in the bathroom at a diner, Meera meets Veronica (Deepika Padukone), an aimless party girl who sees Meera weeping and decides to help her. Veronica takes Meera to her apartment and explains that her rich, estranged father sends her a large amount of money through a cheque every month, which helps Veronica enjoy the life of a spoilt socialite. One night, Veronica takes Meera to a nightclub, where they run into Gautam. At the club, Gautam and Veronica dance intimately and make out. The next morning, after a job interview, Meera comes home to find Gautam on the couch. She learns that Gautam and Veronica slept together the previous night. Soon, Gautam moves in with Veronica and Meera, continuing his "no strings attached" relationship with Veronica. Although Meera initially dislikes him, she comes to accept him, and the three become good friends.

Eventually, Gautam's mother Kavita (Dimple Kapadia) and his uncle Randhir (Boman Irani) arrive, looking for him. Kavita is shocked to see Gautam's drunken escapades with the two girls and wants to know if he has found anyone to settle down with yet. She does not particularly like Veronica due to her lifestyle, while Randhir develops a soft spot for her. Gautam lies to Kavita and says that he is in a relationship with Meera because she is the "ideal Indian girl" who would meet his mother's approval. During this charade, Gautam and Meera become closer and end up falling in love. However, Meera is hesitant to admit it because she does not want to hurt Veronica, her best friend. Consequently, Veronica has fallen in love with Gautam and is trying to win Kavita's approval by becoming a "decent" Indian girl.

Unable to continue with the lie, Gautam sits the two women down and explains to Veronica that even though she loves him, he is in love with Meera. Meera apologizes to Veronica, but Veronica assures her that it is okay and insists that they all go to the club to celebrate. However, at the club, a drunken Veronica breaks down, telling Gautam that she will do whatever he wants, and tells Meera that no one has ever used her the way she did. The next morning, the three part ways. Meera decides to go back to Kunal. Gautam is unable to concentrate on his work or move on, and Veronica becomes depressed and engages in increasingly dangerous and destructive behavior. Thereby, the three of them are depressed. One night, Veronica is badly injured after being hit by a car. Gautam rushes her to the hospital. Meera arrives there with Kunal to make it look like she has gotten over Gautam, and makes Gautam promise to take care of Veronica.

Gautam moves back in with Veronica to care for her. Veronica thinks that they are rebuilding their relationship, but soon realizes that Gautam is no longer the flirtatious, fun-loving man she fell for and that he is his real self only with Meera. She sacrifices her love for Gautam after realizing that they are not meant for each other, and she helps him locate Meera. They seek out Kunal, who tells them that Meera left him because she loved Gautam too much and that she has gone back to India. Gautam and Veronica travel to Delhi. Veronica helps Gautam propose to Meera, and she accepts. Veronica and Meera become best friends again, and the three friends reunite.

== Cast ==
- Saif Ali Khan as Gautam "Gutlu" Kapoor
- Deepika Padukone as Veronica Melaney
- Diana Penty as Meera Sahni
- Dimple Kapadia as Kavita Kapoor, Gautam's mother
- Boman Irani as Randhir "Tinku" Malhotra, Kavita's brother
- Randeep Hooda as Kunal Ahuja, Meera's husband
- Tina Desai as Waitress at the cafe
- Manoj Pahwa as Lovely Chaddha
- Mia Uyeda as Air Hostess
- Charlotte Quita Jones as Charlotte, Veronica's friend
- Sophie Sumner as Sophie, Veronica's friend

== Production ==
=== Casting ===
"The film is for people aged between 12 and 50. It is about friendship, love, romance and has something for all kinds of audience. It is a love story. The designing of the three characters Veronica (Deepika), Gautam (Saif), Meera (Diana), the cool and contemporary look of the film and its music are its USP"

— Producer Dinesh Vijan

Priyanka Chopra was the original choice for the role of Veronica, but was ultimately not cast due to creative issues. Deepika Padukone and Imran Khan were initially signed on to play the leads in the film, after their chemistry in the promos of Break Ke Baad (2010) struck a chord with the youth. However, the latter declined the film and was consequently replaced by Saif Ali Khan, who decided to also produce the film under his production house Illuminati Films. Padukone was offered both the roles of Veronica and Meera, however the character of Meera was similar to her role in Love Aaj Kal (2009) and so she chose the role of Veronica as a challenge. Model Diana Penty, who was earlier supposed to play the female lead in Imtiaz Ali's Rockstar (2011), was later signed on to Cocktail instead, on Ali's suggestion, and thus made her debut in Bollywood.

=== Filming ===
Principal photography began at the end of May 2011, in London. Many scenes were shot indoors, although the crew primarily filmed on the streets of London. Locations of the filming in London included Borough High Street, Borough Market, Portobello Road, Leicester Square, Piccadilly Circus, Mayfair, Clapham Junction, Battersea Park, Bank Station, St. Paul's London, Colville Gardens (Notting Hill) and Brick Lane. The film was also shot in Cape Town, South Africa. Padukone had gyrated to a Punjabi party song ("Main Sharaabi") at The Clapham Grand nightclub in Clapham Junction, by dancing on a table. This is reminiscent of a dance sequence in the song "Chor Bazaari" from Love Aaj Kal. Whilst security was extra tight on the day to prevent outsiders entering the premises, a DJ was hired for the music and club lights were also used to make the scene look as real as possible.

== Marketing ==
The trailer of the film was reported to be attached to the prints of Khan's previous home production Agent Vinod (2012), although the makers decided against this for unknown reasons. The official trailer was eventually launched on 21 May 2012, to a phenomenal response from critics and audiences, crossing 1 million hits on YouTube within 3 days.

== Reception ==
=== Critical response ===
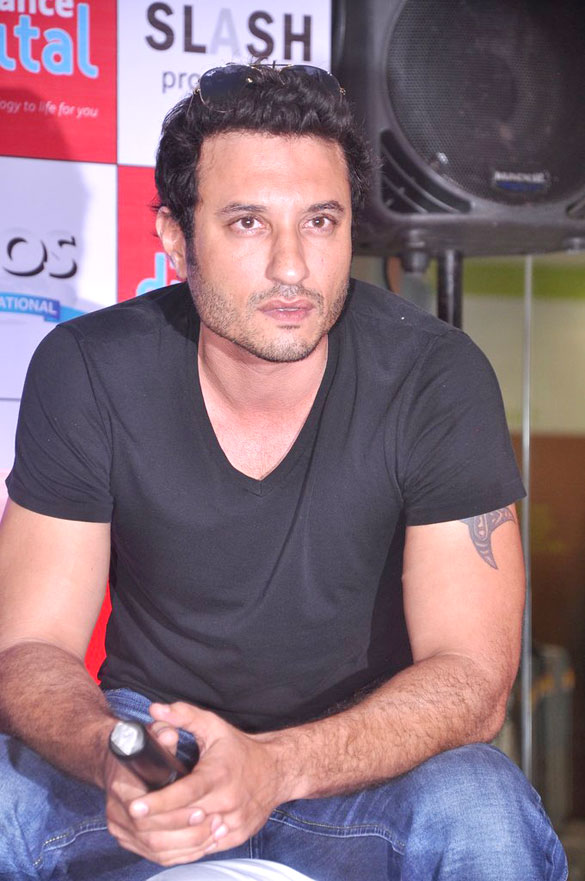
Director, Homi Adajania promoting Cocktail, July 2012

Cocktail received positive reviews from critics, who praised the direction, soundtrack, humor, cinematography, costumes and the performances of the cast, with particular praise directed towards Padukone and Penty's performances. On the review aggregator website Rotten Tomatoes, 67% of 6 critics' reviews are positive, with an average rating of 6.4/10.

Rubina A. Khan of Firstpost gave the film 4/5 stars, saying that "Cocktail is a contemporary film that reflects life as it happens all around us…. just as crazy, twisted, beautiful, funny, weird and lonely as anyone's life can be. It's about easy choices and hard decisions and how life still goes on, despite it all. It's a cocktail you definitely wanna try!"

Khalid Mohamed of Deccan Chronicle gave the film 3.5/5 stars, concluding that "Whatever the flaws and dips in energy-level, Cocktail is a feel-wonderful film. Shake it, stir it and get nicely woozy." Meena Iyer of Times of India gave the film 3.5/5 stars, commenting that "What Cocktail should be truly applauded for is its permissiveness. As a film it breaks shackles and ushers in a new free spirit that Gen-Now will relate to." Aniruddha Guha of DNA India gave the film 3.5/5 stars, stating that "The best thing about Cocktail is that it is as different as a film can get within a very conventional format. My favorite scene has Gautam talk to Veronica and Meera together about his feelings towards each of them. "Look. You love me. I love her. Let's sort this mess out." A rare moment in Hindi cinema!" Anupama Chopra of Hindustan Times gave the film 3.5/5 stars, commenting that "This cocktail is full of fizz."

Nabanita Roy of One India gave the film 3/5 stars, concluding that "On the whole, Cocktail is colourful, fascinating and attention-grabbing. Though the film suffers a few loopholes, but, you definitely can't ignore the threesome magic of Dippy-Saif-Diana." Resham Sengar of Zee News gave the film 3/5 stars, stating that "Cocktail is worth a try!" Devesh Sharma of Filmfare gave the film 3/5 stars, concluding that "All-in-all, it's a nice urban romance. But again, this isn't how I would like to describe a Imtiaz-Homi collaboration. You expected something with a twist, what you get is a pat too sweet – a Bloody Mary without the Vodka." Saibal Chatterjee of NDTV gave the film 3/5 stars, commenting that "Cocktail has just the right mix of fizz and flavour to allow the occasional and inevitable crinkles of triteness to flow well below the surface. It is definitely worth a visit to the multiplex." Vinayak Chakravarthy of India Today gave the film 3/5 stars, concluding that "If Cocktail works, it is mainly for the characters Imtiaz has penned well as the cool with which the lead stars live them on screen." Taran Adarsh of Bollywood Hungama gave the film 3/5 stars, saying that "On the whole, Cocktail has a fascinating first-half, charismatic performances, harmonious music and the trendy look and styling as its aces, but the second-half is not as tempting or intoxicating as the first hour. It pales when compared to the attention-grabbing first-hour. Yet, all said and done, this one's primarily targeted at the Gen Next, especially those in metros, who might identify with the on-screen characters." Blessy Chettiar of DNA India gave the film 3/5 stars, stating that "You can't hate a film like Cocktail nor can you love it in totality. If you've liked Ali's storytelling before, there's no harm in catching it at least once. Cheers!"

Bollywood Life gave the film 2.5/5 stars, stating that "As for the film – very niche, very easy on the eye and ear and a lot of the time, very fun." Kaushik L.M of Behind Woods gave the film 2.5/5 stars, concluding that "The light-hearted fun and romance resurrect this cocktail." Shubhra Gupta of Indian Express gave the film 2.5/5 stars, concluding that "Cocktail is nice while the fizz lasts." Roshni Devi of Koimoi gave the film 2.5/5 stars, saying that "Cocktail is a nice and enjoyable film for the dialogues, songs and performances. But the second-half is a real drag."

Sonia Chopra of Sify gave the film 2/5 stars, stating that "Drink this cocktail if you must; but be warned, the concoction isn't as appetizing as it looks!" That's So Gloss! echoed this criticism in a review, stating: "[Cocktail] says it's okay when the guy does it, but when a lady does the same thing, she is immoral, and society must punish her in some way. A textbook example of a "double-standard"." Martin D'Souza of GlamSham gave the film 2/5 stars, saying that "It's a cocktail alright, but one which lacks punch. A flat drink with no fizz and lots of salt at the rim of the glass which knocks you back with its sting." Rajeev Masand of CNN-IBN gave the film 2/5 stars, concluding that "I'm going with 2 out of 5 for director Homi Adajania's Cocktail. With the right ingredients in the right proportions, this might have made for a smooth concoction. But Cocktail is a mostly-flat romance; one that could've done with more heart." Janhavi Samant of MidDay gave the film 2/5 stars, stating that "There are people who love films about free-falling NRIs, who have jobs but never seem to work, who love the thrills of casual sex but only till they find a desi wife who will serve home-cooked food, and who can go to Cape Town from London for just a weekend, and whose biggest crisis is to decide if what they feel is 'true' love. But this critic ain't one of them." Suparna Sharma of Deccan Chronicle gave the film 2/5 stars, commenting that "Cocktail, because of its high sugar content, initially gives a heady rush, but leaves a bad hangover." Raja Sen of Rediff gave the film 2/5 stars, commenting that "It's a pity, and not just because this could have been the great unconventional cinematic threesome we so desperately need. Cocktail has a handful of moments and a few genuine sparks, but finally crashes and burns so spectacularly that it's hard to focus on the positives. We must thank it, thus, for Diana Penty."

Kunal Guha of Yahoo! gave the film 1.5/5 stars, stating that "One of the chief reasons why this cocktail fails to hit your sweet spot is because you don't empathize with any of the characters. There could be many reasons for this but to point one: none of them seem worthy of your attention and concern. Still keen to figure out who Saif ends up with? Why don’t you deduce it yourself like any mature adult would? I would recommend the scientific method used to pick item girls in films lately: Eenie Meenie…" Mayank Shekhar of Daily Bhaskar gave the film 1.5/5 stars, concluding that "You feel worse for Saif aged 42. It's hard to tell how every woman he meets in the film gets turned on by his random charms. The world is his playground. He still makes it seem vaguely convincing. Here's a big league actor at the top of his form. Look at his recent films: Agent Vinod, Aarakshan (2011), Kurbaan (2009). Forget those films. Just check out his performances. He could do with much better films. Surely. Seriously."

== Music ==
The soundtrack was composed by Pritam, with lyrics written by Irshad Kamil. The rights of a famous Pakistani Sufi song were bought for the film. "Alif Allah" (a celebration of Allah, Islamic prophet Muhammad and other Khalifs), originally sung and popularized by Pakistani Punjabi folk singer Arif Lohar, was revised.

"Angreji Beat", a Punjabi song sung by Yo Yo Honey Singh and featuring Gippy Grewal, is also used in the title credits, as well as the trailer, though hasn't been included in the album. One of the songs "Main Sharaabi" has been composed by Singh and sung by Pritam. The background score is composed by Salim–Sulaiman.

The music album of Cocktail received highly positive reviews. "Tumhi Ho Bandhu", "Daaru Desi" and "Second-Hand-Jawaani", which featured the three leads became chartbusters. "Tumhi Ho Bandhu" paved the way to #1 at the Radio-Mirchi Top-100 Countdown.

== Box office ==
=== Domestic ===
Cocktail had an excellent opening of 75–80% on average at multiplexes and having bumper opening at many multiplexes of North India at around 100%. The film had a very good first day as it collected around ₹108 million (US$1.1 million) nett on day 1. It showed good growth on Saturday as it collected ₹118 million (US$1.2 million) nett. Cocktail had an extraordinary weekend at multiplexes than single screens as it notched up business of around ₹36.7 million (US$380,000) nett from both. Cocktail held up well on Monday as it collected around ₹60 million (US$620,000) nett. Cocktail collected around ₹50 million (US$520,000) nett on Tuesday. The business after 5 days is approx ₹468 million (US$4.9 million) nett. Cocktail did good business in its first week as it collected ₹545 million (US$5.7 million) nett approx at the domestic box office, making it the first multiplex-targeted film to cross the ₹500 million (US$5.2 million) mark in the first week. Cocktail grossed ₹173 million (US$1.8 million) nett approx in week 2. Cocktail fell badly in its third week due to new releases. The film has collected ₹730 million (US$7.6 million) nett in 3 weeks. It was declared a box-office hit. In the domestic market, its final figures came at ₹750 million (US$7.8 million). The film's final all-India distributor share was ₹373 million (US$3.9 million).

=== International ===
Cocktail opened well in overseas markets. The opening collections was around $2.6 million. Cocktail dropped in its second weekend and has grossed ₹207 million (US$2.1 million) in 10 days. The film eventually collected US$4.50 million overseas.

== Home media ==
Cocktail was released on DVD and VCD by Eros International on 13 September 2012. The DVD is a 2-Disc edition, having Bonus Features on a separate DVD along with. The Blu-ray of Cocktail was released on 29 September 2012, again a 2-Disc edition (Blu-ray + DVD) with Bonus Features on the DVD. The film is also made available on Eros Now.

== Accolades ==
Year	Award	Category	Awardee	Result
2012	Vogue Beauty Awards	Best Female Debut	Diana Penty	Won
2012	UK Bollywood Cosmopolitan Awards	Best Female Debut	Diana Penty	Won
2012	Smita Patil Memorial Award	Best Actress	Deepika Padukone	Won
2013	Filmfare Awards	Best Actress	Deepika Padukone	Nominated
2013	Filmfare Awards	Best Music Director	Pritam	Nominated
2013	Filmfare Awards	Best Female Playback Singer	Kavita Seth for "Tumhi Ho Bandhu"	Nominated
2013	Producers Guild Film Awards	Best Actress	Deepika Padukone	Nominated
2013	Zee Cine Awards	Best Actor – Female	Deepika Padukone	Nominated
2013	BIG Star Entertainment Awards	Most Entertaining Film Actor - Female	Deepika Padukone	Nominated
2013	BIG Star Entertainment Awards	Best Actress (Critics)	Deepika Padukone	Won
2013	IIFA Awards	Best Actress	Deepika Padukone	Nominated
2013	Screen Awards	Best Actress	Deepika Padukone	Nominated
2013	Stardust Awards	Best Drama Actress	Deepika Padukone	Nominated
2013	TOIFA Awards	Best Actor – Female	Deepika Padukone	Nominated
2013	TOIFA Awards	Best Actor (Critics) - Female	Deepika Padukone	Won
2013	5th Mirchi Music Awards	Song of The Year	"Tumhi Ho Bandhu"	Nominated
2013	5th Mirchi Music Awards	Album of The Year	Pritam, Irshad Kamil, Amitabh Bhattacharya	Nominated
2013	5th Mirchi Music Awards	Female Vocalist of The Year	Kavita Seth for "Tumhi Ho Bandhu"	Nominated
2013	5th Mirchi Music Awards	Music Composer of The Year	Pritam for "Tumhi Ho Bandhu"	Nominated
2013	5th Mirchi Music Awards	Upcoming Male Vocalist of The Year	Javed Bashir for "Tera Naam Japdi Phiran (Version 2)"	Nominated

== Spiritual sequel ==
A spiritual sequel, Cocktail 2 was released on 19 June 2026, with Adajania returning as a director. It stars Shahid Kapoor, Kriti Sanon, and Rashmika Mandanna.
