= Mathias Duplessy =

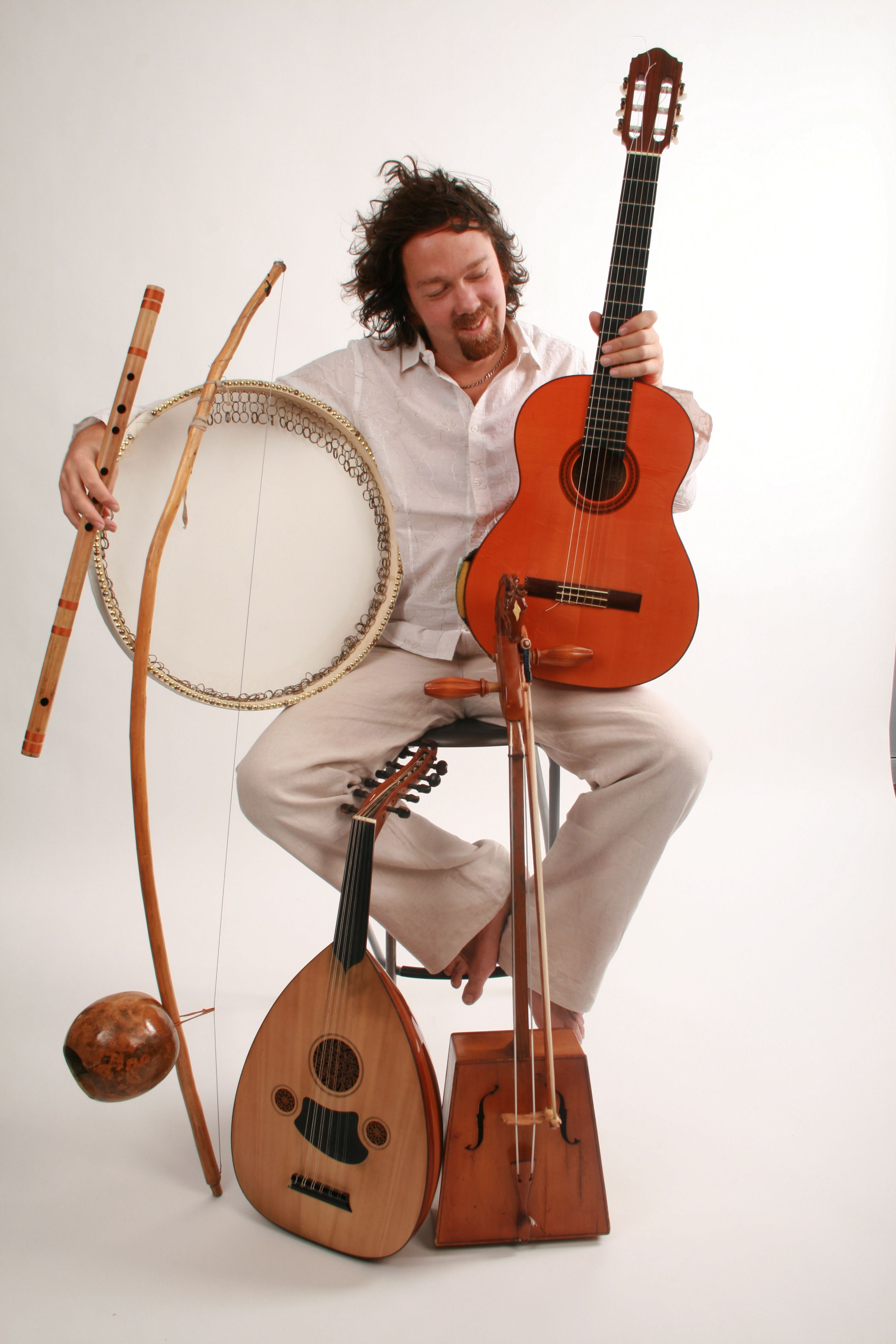
- Mathias Duplessy

Background information
- Born: October 28, 1972 (age 53)
- Genres: Jazz, world, classical
- Instruments: guitar, morin khuur
- Label: Editions Absilone
- Website: http://www.mathiasduplessy.com

Mathias Duplessy (born October 28, 1972) is a French composer and multi-instrumentalist.

== Career ==
Duplessy started playing the guitar at age 6 and began appearing on stage from the age of 18, playing as a guitarist with artists from the French and international scene including Sophia Charai, Bevinda, Monica Passos, Nico Morelli, Dikès, Omar Pene, Ameth Male, Sarah Alexander, and Pop Nadeah. For ten years, he has also done Mongolian overtone singing and played the morin khuur, a Mongolian fiddle.

In early 2016, Duplessy released a new album, Crazy Horse, co-composed by Enkhjargal Dandarvaanchig. He has three albums to his name and has participated in thirty soundtracks.

Duplessy collaborated with Sufi musician Mukhtiyar Ali to write the music for the 2014 English-language film Finding Fanny.

He also co-composed the background score for the 2024 Hindi-language biographical film Swatantrya Veer Savarkar, alongside Sandesh Shandilya. Their collaboration contributed to the film's emotional tone and period authenticity.
