= Maddock Horror Comedy Universe =

Shared fictional universe

- Official logo
- Created by: Dinesh Vijan; Amar Kaushik
- Original work: Stree (2018)
- Owners: Maddock Films; Jio Studios
- Years: 2018–present

Films and television
- Films: Stree (2018); Bhediya (2022); Munjya (2024); Stree 2 (2024); Thamma (2025); Shakti Shalini (2027)

Financial summary
- Budget: est. ₹308–365 crore
- Box office: est. ₹1,520 crore

The Maddock Horror Comedy Universe, abbreviated as MHCU, is an Indian media franchise and shared universe consisting of Hindi-language supernatural comedy horror films created and produced by Maddock Films. All films in this universe are based on Indian folklore.

The first installment, Stree, was released as film. The universe-building began with Bhediya, in which characters from Stree appeared. This was followed by Munjya, where characters from Bhediya and Stree appeared. Stree 2 continued by featuring characters from Bhediya. Thamma features cameos from Bhediya, Stree, Munjya, and Stree 2, making Thamma the central link connecting all five films.

The universe was initially titled the Maddock Supernatural Universe, before the official MHCU lineup reveal in January 2025. This change in title was further confirmed with a logo reveal in September 2025, and also by Dinesh Vijan during a Thamma team Interview in October 2025.

== Overview ==
The idea for a shared universe occurred to Dinesh Vijan from a conversation with American film producer Charles Roven in 2012, when Roven told him, "when you're making films, keep them in a box".

Abhishek Banerjee is the only actor to have appeared in every film in the universe (as "Jana"), and has been likened to Nick Fury from the Marvel Cinematic Universe as the "connective thread" across the films.

Roohi, being promoted as a standalone sequel to Stree before its release, was initially planned as an entry in the universe but was removed from the official canon due to negative critical reviews and its overall failure to contribute to the franchise's world-building efforts; Roohi featured no contributions to the broader narrative. The primary creative conflict stemmed from Rajkummar Rao playing entirely different characters in Roohi and Stree, which complicated shared-universe continuity, alongside the fact that the film was directed by Hardik Mehta, not series architect Amar Kaushik, who did not consider it part of his specific vision. Kaushik said it would not be part of the universe "unless I feel that a double role is needed for Raj". While no longer canon, it was included as an easter egg in a background TV scene in Munjya, establishing the film itself as a fictional film within the MHCU timeline rather than a factual event.

== Films ==
=== Released films ===
Film	Release date	Director(s)	Producer(s)
Stree	31 August 2018	Amar Kaushik	Dinesh Vijan and Raj & DK
Bhediya	25 November 2022	Amar Kaushik	Dinesh Vijan and Jyoti Deshpande
Munjya	7 June 2024	Aditya Sarpotdar	Dinesh Vijan and Amar Kaushik
Stree 2	15 August 2024	Amar Kaushik	Dinesh Vijan and Jyoti Deshpande
Thamma	21 October 2025	Aditya Sarpotdar	Dinesh Vijan and Amar Kaushik

==== Stree (2018) ====
Stree: Mard Ko Dard Hoga, the first installment of the franchise is directed by Amar Kaushik and produced by Dinesh Vijan and Raj & DK. It stars Shraddha Kapoor and Rajkummar Rao, alongside Pankaj Tripathi, Aparshakti Khurana and Abhishek Banerjee. The plot is inspired by the Karnataka urban legend of Nale Ba, which means "come tomorrow" in Kannada, adapted in the film as "O Stree Kal Aana" (oh woman, come tomorrow) in the film. Stree was theatrically released worldwide on 31 August 2018 and received positive reviews. The film grossed over ₹180 crore at the box office against a budget of ₹23–25 crore, becoming a box-office success. The film received ten nominations at the 64th Filmfare Awards and won Best Debut Director for Kaushik.

==== Bhediya (2022) ====
Bhediya: Jungle Mein Kaand, the second and sophomore installment was directed by Amar Kaushik and produced by Dinesh Vijan and Mrighdeep Singh Lamba. The film stars Varun Dhawan alongside Kriti Sanon, Abhishek Banerjee, Deepak Dobriyal and Paalin Kabak. The plot is inspired by the North-East Indian Legends of Weretigers; particularly the legend of 'Khla Phuli' from Meghalaya -- reinterpreted in the movie as an Arunachal Pradesh tale about a shape-shifting Werewolf 'Yapum' who kills to protect the jungle. Additionally, characters from Stree appeared in the film, including cameo appearances by Shraddha Kapoor, Rajkummar Rao and Aparshakti Khurana. Abhishek Banerjee reprises his role as Jana (Janardan), Bhaskar's cousin. Bhediya was theatrically released on 25 November 2022, garnering positive reviews. The film grossed about ₹109 crore against a production budget of approximately ₹60 crore at the box office. It received 13 nominations at the 68th Filmfare Awards, including Best Film (Critics), Best Actor (Critics) and Best Special Effects.

==== Munjya (2024) ====
Munjya, the third installment was directed by Aditya Sarpotdar and produced by Dinesh Vijan and Amar Kaushik. The film stars Sharvari, Abhay Verma, Sathyaraj and Mona Singh. The titular character was created using CGI. Additionally, characters from Bhediya made cameo appearances in the film, including Varun Dhawan and Abhishek Banerjee. The film is based on folklore from Konkan that depicts a mischievous spirit named Munjya from Marathi tradition, which haunts peepal trees or wells. This spirit arises when a man dies unmarried between his thread ceremony and marriage ritual and often causes disturbances to fulfil his unfulfilled desires. Munjya was theatrically released on 7 June 2024, garnering mixed reviews. The film grossed over ₹132 crore worldwide against a production budget of ₹30 crore and became one of the highest-grossing Hindi films of 2024. The movie, initially titled Munjha, was being speculated to be a prequel to Stree.

==== Stree 2 (2024) ====
Stree 2: Sarkate Ka Aatank, the fourth installment and direct sequel to Stree was directed by Amar Kaushik and produced by Dinesh Vijan and Jyoti Deshpande. The film stars Shraddha Kapoor, Rajkummar Rao, Pankaj Tripathi, Abhishek Banerjee, Aparshakti Khurana and Tamannaah Bhatia. The story follows the events after Stree, where the small town of Chanderi is haunted by a beheaded creature, "Sarkata", who is abducting women. It is based on the Bengali legend of Skondhokata which is of a headless ghost, typically believed to be the spirits of individuals who lost their heads in fatal train accidents; that capture humans and force them into slavery to help search for its missing head. Stree 2 was theatrically released on 15 August 2024. The film received positive reviews from critics and has grossed over ₹880+ crore at the box office against a production budget of ₹50–120 crore. (Note: Stree 2's reported budget varies between ₹50 crore (India Today) – ₹60 crore (DNA India and The Financial Express) – ₹105 crore (Bollywood Hungama))

==== Thamma (2025) ====
Thamma, the fifth installment in the Maddock Horror Comedy Universe, was directed by Aditya Sarpotdar and produced by Dinesh Vijan and Amar Kaushik. Starring Ayushmann Khurrana, Rashmika Mandanna, Nawazuddin Siddiqui and Paresh Rawal, the film follows a journalist transformed into a vampiric 'Betaal' after a bear attack, who must battle ancient evil and navigate a forbidden romance. The film blends Hindu mythology with a modern romantic-supernatural theme and was theatrically released on October 21, 2025, receiving mixed-to-positive reviews and grossing an estimated ₹169.75 crore against a ₹145 crore budget.

The film was initially titled Sunehri Sunehra in 2022, changing to Vampires of Vijaynagar in 2023, Thama in 2024, and finally Thamma in 2025.

=== Upcoming films ===
Film	Release date	Director(s)	Producer(s)	Status
Shakti Shalini	March 2027	Aditya Sarpotdar	Dinesh Vijan and Amar Kaushik	Post-production
Chhoti Stree	Feb/June 2028	Amar Kaushik	Dinesh Vijan and Amar Kaushik	Pre-production
Stree 3	Aug/Dec 2028	Amar Kaushik	Dinesh Vijan and Amar Kaushik	Pre-production
Chamunda	TBA	TBA	Dinesh Vijan and Amar Kaushik	In development
Bhediya 2	TBA	Amar Kaushik	Dinesh Vijan and Amar Kaushik	In development
Maha Munjya	TBA	Aditya Sarpotdar	Dinesh Vijan and Amar Kaushik	In development
Pehla Mahayudh	TBA	TBA	Dinesh Vijan and Amar Kaushik	In development
Doosra Mahayudh	TBA	TBA	Dinesh Vijan and Amar Kaushik	In development
Untitled Thamma Spin-Off	TBA	TBA	Dinesh Vijan and Amar Kaushik	In development

==== Shakti Shalini ====
The sixth installment in the franchise. It will star Aneet Padda in a titular role with Vishal Jethwa as the male lead, Vineet Kumar Singh as the main antagonist and Nana Patekar in a pivotal role. The main character is also called the mother of all. Principal photography began in March 2026 and filming wrapped up in June 2026.

The film was earlier scheduled to release on 24 December 2026, coinciding with the Christmas weekend. However, the release date was later on postponed to March 2027 to avoid a clash with Shah Rukh Khan's upcoming film King. It will also mark Patekar's posthumous film following his death on 8 October 2026.

==== Chhoti Stree ====
The seventh installment in the franchise. Chhoti Stree is an upcoming animated film which will act as a prequel to Stree. The film will be based on Shraddha Kapoor's character (Stree's daughter) from Stree and will reportedly be released six months before the release of Stree 3. The ending of the film will be a shift to the present, showing the prologue for Stree 3, transitioning from animation to live-action at the end.

==== Stree 3 ====
The eighth installment in the franchise and a sequel to Stree 2. The film will feature Shraddha Kapoor, Rajkummar Rao, Pankaj Tripathi, Abhishek Banerjee, Aparshakti Khurana and Tamannaah Bhatia reprising their roles with Akshay Kumar as the main antagonist, reprising his role from his appearance as last living descendant of Chandrabhan (popular as 'Sarkata') in Stree 2. He had an unknown hatred against his own family which will be known in Stree 3. Producer Dinesh Vijan confirmed that Stree 3 has already been written. Director Amar Kaushik mentioned it would take three years to produce..The film is expected to go on floors from the end of 2027 with a release dates of either independence day or Christmas 2028.

==== Chamunda ====
The ninth installment in the franchise. The film will star Alia Bhatt in the titular role as Chamunda with Akshay Kumar will be the main antagonist, reprising his role from his appearance as last living descendant of Chandrabhan (popular as 'Sarkata') in Stree 2 and Stree 3. The film is set to release soon, after the release of Stree 3.

==== Bhediya 2 ====
The tenth installment and a sequel to Bhediya, with Amar Kaushik returning as the director and Varun Dhawan reprising his role. The film will heavily focus on the hatred between Bhediya & Betaal as hinted in Thamma, with the slogan "THE HUNT BEGINS...". While the project has been officially announced, the makers are still in the pre-production phase but principal photography is expected to start soon. The film was set to release in 2026, however it got delayed. It is scheduled to release soon, after the release of Chamunda.

==== Maha Munjya ====
The eleventh installment in the franchise and a sequel to Munjya. Abhay Verma and Sharvari will be reprising their roles as Bittu and Bela respectively. The film is set to release soon.

==== Pehla Mahayudh ====
The twelfth and antepenultimate installment in the franchise, Pehla Mahayudh, will serve as the first part of the two-part finale for the current phase of the franchise. The story will continue and conclude in the thirteenth installment, titled Doosara Mahayudh. Pehla Mahayudh will feature characters from all previous films in the franchise. The film is set to release soon. Makers Dinesh Vijan, Jyoti Deshpande and director Amar Kaushik confirmed that Akshay Kumar will lead both the parts as Chandravanshi (descendant of Chanderi Chief Chandrabhan Sarkata) with several stars from previous installments will be pitted against him.

==== Doosara Mahayudh ====
The thirteenth and penultimate installment in the franchise, Doosara Mahayudh, will serve as the conclusion to the two-part finale of the current phase of the franchise. Picking up directly from the events of Pehla Mahayudh, the film will bring together characters from all previous installments for a climactic showdown.

==== Untitled Thamma Spin-Off ====
The fourteenth and final installment in the franchise on Untitled Thamma Spin-Off. Dinesh Vijan has confirmed the development on a "spin-off on Thamma" and mentioned that it will be part of a larger cinematic universe, and will be released after the Mahayudh. The announcement was made during a promotional interview for Thamma.

== Recurring characters ==
This table lists the characters that connect the Maddock Horror Comedy Universe.

Character	Actor	Films					
Character	Actor	Stree	Bhediya	Munjya	Stree 2	Thamma	Shakti Shalini
Vikrant "Vicky" Parashar	Rajkummar Rao	Main	Cameo		Main		
Unnamed (Note: A script leak tells her name to be Gayatri, but it has not yet been revealed on-screen.)	Shraddha Kapoor	Main	Cameo		Main		
Bhaskar Sharma / Bhediya	Varun Dhawan		Main	Cameo	Cameo	Cameo	
Dr. Anika Mittal / Lady Bhediya	Kriti Sanon	Cameo	Main				
Bittu 2	Abhay Verma			Main			
Bela	Sharvari			Main			
Alok Goyal / Thamma	Ayushmann Khurrana					Main	
Tarika / Tadaka	Rashmika Mandanna					Main	
Shalini	Aneet Padda					Mention	Main
TBA	Vishal Jethwa						Main
Chandrabhan / Sarkata	Sunil Kumar				Main	Mention	
Naya Sarkata	Akshay Kumar				Cameo		
Naya Sarkata	Sunil Kumar					Cameo	
Yakshasan	Nawazuddin Siddiqui				Mention	Main	
TBA	Vineet Kumar Singh						Main
Janardhan "Jana" Sharma	Abhishek Banerjee	Main	Main	Cameo	Main	Cameo	
Bittu 1	Aparshakti Khurana	Main	Cameo		Main	Mention	
Rudra	Pankaj Tripathi	Main			Main		
Elvis Karim Prabhakar	Sathyaraj			Main		Cameo	
Gotya / Munjya	Ayush Ulagadde			Main		Mention	
Gotya / Munjya	Subbu			Main		Mention	
Stree	Flora Saini	Main					
Stree	Bhoomi Rajgor				Main		
Ram Bajaj Goyal	Paresh Rawal					Main	
P. K. Yadav	Faisal Malik					Main	
Tantrik	Nana Patekar						Main
Shama	Tamannaah Bhatia	Mention			Cameo		
Chanderi Girl	Nora Fatehi	Cameo				Cameo	

=== Main characters ===
==== Vicky ====
- Role: A highly skilled ladies' tailor from the town of Chanderi.
- Arc: Falls for a mysterious woman and discovers he is the prophesied protector of Chanderi.
- Key Actions: Disables the ghost Stree in the first film by cutting her hair and later defeats her misogynistic nemesis, Sarkata, in the sequel.

==== She; Unnamed Ghost ====
- Role: An enigmatic, nameless woman with supernatural abilities who serves as Vicky's love interest.
- Arc: Initially suspected of being the ghost, she is actually a sorceress revealed to be Stree’s daughter.
- Key Actions: Uses Stree’s severed braid to absorb her powers to fight evil, and later helps Vicky defeat Sarkata. She whispers her real name to Vicky at the end of Stree 2, keeping it a secret from the audience.

==== Bhaskar Sharma ====
- Role: A city-slicker road contractor sent to develop a highway project in Ziro, Arunachal Pradesh.
- Arc: Gaining shape-shifting werewolf powers after being bitten by a mythical wolf (Yapum), he transforms from an eco-destroyer into an empathetic protector of the forest.
- Key Actions: Fights off corrupt officials trying to deforest the land and makes cross-over cameos in most projects.

==== Dr. Anika Mittal ====
- Role: A quirky local veterinarian in Ziro who treats Bhaskar and becomes his love interest.
- Arc: She is secretly the original Yapum (werewolf) protecting the forest for a century.
- Key Actions: Sacrifices her life while protecting the jungle from corrupt humans, passing her protective werewolf mantle onto Bhaskar.

==== Bittu Gokhle ====
- Role: A timid young man working at his mother’s salon in Pune.
- Arc: Discovers he is a direct descendant of Gotya, a boy who became the obsessive, tree-dwelling monster Munjya after dying during his thread ceremony.
- Key Actions: Navigates the ghost's relentless haunting and works with his friends and an occultist to save his crush from the spirit.

==== Bela ====
- Role: A modern young woman and Bittu’s close friend/crush, who returns from Munich.
- Arc: She is the granddaughter of Munni—the girl the original Munjya was obsessively in love with before his death.
- Key Actions: Becomes the primary target of Munjya's terrifying matrimonial obsession and fights alongside Bittu to subdue the creature.

==== Alok Goyal ====
- Role: A regular city man whose life changes when he crosses paths with supernatural forces.
- Arc: He falls into a complex, "bloody love story" with a mythical creature.
- Key Actions: Navigates love and danger against the ancient antagonist Yakshasan (played by Nawazuddin Siddiqui).

==== Tadaka ====
- Role: A powerful supernatural entity bound by destiny and bloodlines.
- Arc: She experiences a turbulent, star-crossed romance with Alok.
- Key Actions: Fights alongside Alok to protect their bond against cosmic and ancient dark forces.

== Crew ==
Occupation	Films					
Occupation	Stree	Bhediya	Munjya	Stree 2	Thamma	Shakti Shalini
Director	Amar Kaushik	Amar Kaushik	Aditya Sarpotdar	Amar Kaushik	Aditya Sarpotdar	Aditya Sarpotdar
Producer	Dinesh Vijan, Raj & DK	Dinesh Vijan, Jyoti Deshpande	Dinesh Vijan, Amar Kaushik	Dinesh Vijan, Jyoti Deshpande	Dinesh Vijan, Amar Kaushik	Dinesh Vijan
Writer	Raj & DK, Sumit Arora (dialogues)	Niren Bhatt	Niren Bhatt (screenplay), Yogesh Chandekar (story)	Niren Bhatt	Niren Bhatt, Suresh Mathew, Arun Falara	Durgesh Singh
Cinematographer	Amalendu Chaudhary	Jishnu Bhattacharjee	Saurabh Goswami	Jishnu Bhattacharjee	Saurabh Goswami	
Editor	Hemal Kothari	Sanyukta Kaza	Monisha R. Baldawa	Hemanti Sarkar	Hemanti Sarkar	
Composer	Sachin–Jigar	Sachin–Jigar	Sachin–Jigar	Sachin–Jigar	Sachin–Jigar	
Background score	Ketan Sodha	Ketan Sodha	Justin Varghese	Justin Varghese	Sachin–Jigar	
Lyricist	Vayu, Badshah	Amitabh Bhattacharya	Amitabh Bhattacharya	Amitabh Bhattacharya	Amitabh Bhattacharya	
Production company	Maddock Films, D2R Films	Maddock Films, Jio Studios	Maddock Films	Maddock Films, Jio Studios	Maddock Films	Maddock Films
Distributor	AA Films, Jio Studios, PHARS Film	Pen Marudhar	Pen Marudhar	PVR Inox Pictures, Pen Marudhar	PVR Inox Pictures, Yash Raj Films	

== Release and reception ==
=== Box office performance ===
Film	Release date	Budget	Worldwide box office	OTT	Running time	Ref.
Stree	30 August 2018	₹23 crore (US$3.36 million) – ₹25 crore (US$3.66 million)	₹180.76 crore (US$26.43 million)	Amazon Prime Video, JioHotstar, YouTube Movies, Netflix, Google TV & Apple TV	129 Mins (2 hrs 9 mins)	
Bhediya	25 November 2022	₹60 crore (US$7.63 million)	₹89.97 crore (US$11.45 million)	JioHotstar	156 mins (2 hrs 36 mins)	
Munjya	7 June 2024	₹30 crore (US$3.59 million)	₹132.13 crore (US$15.79 million)	JioHotstar	123 mins (2 hrs 3 mins)	
Stree 2	15 August 2024	₹50 crore (US$5.98 million) – ₹105 crore (US$12.55 million)	₹874.58 crore (US$104.53 million)	Amazon Prime Video	143 mins (2 hrs 23 mins)	
Thamma	21 October 2025	₹145 crore (equivalent to ₹150 crore or US$16 million in 2026)	₹169.75 crore (equivalent to ₹175 crore or US$18 million in 2026)	Amazon Prime Video	147 mins (2 hrs 27 mins)	
Total		₹308 crore (US$32 million)–₹365 crore (US$38 million)	₹1,447.19 crore (US$150 million)			

=== Critical reception ===
Film	Rotten Tomatoes	IMDb
Stree	75%	7.5
Bhediya	62%	6.7
Munjya	56%	6.3
Stree 2	57%	6.9
Thamma	36%	5.8
