= List of highest-grossing Hindi films =

Hindi cinema, popularly known as Bollywood, consisting of films in the Hindi language. This ranking lists the highest-grossing Hindi films, originally made in Hindi language, based on conservative global box office estimates as reported by organizations classified as green by Wikipedia. (Note: See WP:RSP, WP:ICTFSOURCES) The figures are not adjusted for inflation. However, there is no official tracking of figures, and sources publishing data are frequently pressured to increase their estimates.

Background shading indicates that a film, or at least one from a series, is currently showing in theatres worldwide.

== Highest-grossing Hindi films ==
The top 25 highest-grossing Hindi films worldwide are listed here.

Rank	Title	Worldwide gross	Year	Ref.
1	Dangal	₹2,023.81 crore	2016	(Note: Dangal's reported worldwide grosses vary between ₹1968.03 crore (Bollywood Hungama) – ₹2,023.81 crore (Box Office India) – ₹2,054 (Box Office Mojo))
2	Dhurandhar: The Revenge	₹1,852.44 crore	2026	
3	Ramayana: Part 1	₹1,608.27 crore	2026	
4	Dhurandhar	₹1,350.83 crore	2025	
5	Jawan	₹1,148.32 crore	2023	
6	Pathaan	₹1,050.30 crore	2023	
7	Bajrangi Bhaijaan	₹918 crore	2015	(Note: Bajrangi Bhaijaan's reported worldwide gross collection of ₹918.18 crore (Bollywood Hungama))
8	Animal	₹917 crore	2023	
9	Stree 2	₹912 crore	2024	
10	Secret Superstar	₹874 crore	2024	(Note: Secret Superstar's reported worldwide grosses vary between ₹858.43(Box Office India) – ₹966 crore (India Today))
11	Chhaava	₹809 crore	2025	(Note: Chhaava's reported worldwide grosses vary between ₹797.34 crore (Bollywood Hungama) – ₹800 crore (India Today) – ₹804.85 crore (The Economic Times) – ₹807.40 crore (DNA India) – ₹809 crore (Hindustan Times))
12	PK	₹792 crore	2014	(Note: PK's reported worldwide grosses vary between ₹750.60 crore(Box Office India) – ₹769.89 crore (Bollywood Hungama))
13	Gadar 2	₹691.08 crore	2023	
14	Sultan	₹623.33 crore	2016	(Note: Sultan's reported worldwide grosses vary between ₹615.71 crore (Box Office India) – ₹623.33 crore (Firstpost))
15	Sanju	₹586.85 crore	2018	(Note: Sanju's reported worldwide gross collection is ₹586.85 crore (Bollywood Hungama))
16	Saiyaara	₹579.23 crore	2025	
17	Padmaavat	₹571.98 crore	2018	(Note: Padmaavat's reported worldwide grosses vary between ₹563.55 (Box Office India) – 571.98 crore (Bollywood Hungama))
18	Drishyam: The Conclusion	₹571.26 crore	2026	
19	Tiger Zinda Hai	₹565.10 crore	2017	
20	Dhoom 3	₹556.74 crore	2013	(Note: Dhoom 3's reported worldwide grosses vary between ₹556.74 crore (Bollywood Hungama) – ₹558.42 crore (Box Office India))
21	War	₹475.62 crore	2019	(Note: War's reported worldwide grosses vary between ₹474.79 core (India Today – 475.62 crore (Bollywood Hungama))
22	Dunki	₹470.60 crore	2023	
23	Tiger 3	₹466.63 crore	2023	
24	Border 2	₹464.50 crore	2026	
25	Andhadhun	₹456.89 crore	2018	(Note: Andhadhun's reported worldwide grosses vary between ₹444.48 crore (Box Office India) – ₹456.89 crore (Bollywood Hungama))

== Highest-grossing Hindi films in India ==
Rank	Title	Total gross	Year	Ref.
1	Dhurandhar: The Revenge	₹1,374.68 crore	2026	
2	Ramayana: Part 1	₹1,059.24 crore	2026	
3	Dhurandhar	₹1,057.80 crore	2025	
4	Jawan	₹761.98 crore	2023	
5	Stree 2	₹740.28 crore	2024	
6	Chhaava	₹708.50 crore	2025	
7	Animal	₹662.33 crore	2023	
8	Pathaan	₹654.28 crore	2023	
9	Gadar 2	₹625.28 crore	2023	
10	Dangal	₹511.58 crore	2016	

== Highest-grossing films by opening day ==
Rank	Title	Total gross	Year	Ref.
1	Dhurandhar: The Revenge	₹240 crore	2026	
2	Adipurush	₹140 crore	2023	
3	Jawan (Note: The film was produced in both the Hindi and Telugu languages, according to the filmmakers.)	₹129 crore	2023	
4	Ramayana: Part 1	₹121.62 crore	2026	
5	Animal	₹116 crore	2023	
6	Pathaan	₹106 crore	2023	
7	Tiger 3	₹95.23 crore	2023	
8	Drishyam: The Conclusion	₹95.10 crore	2026	
9	War 2	₹85 crore	2025	
10	Stree 2	₹80 crore	2024	

== Highest-grossing films by month ==
Month	Title	Worldwide gross	Year	Ref.
January	Pathaan	₹1,050.30–1,052.50 crore	2023	
February	Chhaava	₹797.34–809 crore	2025	
March	Dhurandhar: The Revenge	₹1,850.61 crore	2026	
April	Bhooth Bangla	₹247.26 crore	2026	
May	Yeh Jawaani Hai Deewani	₹319.60 crore	2013	
June	Sanju	₹578.45–586.85 crore	2018	
July	Bajrangi Bhaijaan	₹867–969.06 crore	2015	
August	Stree 2	₹837–874.58 crore	2024	
September	Jawan	₹1,148.32–1,159 crore	2023	
October	Secret Superstar	₹835–966 crore	2017	
November	Ramayana: Part 1	₹1,600.40 crore	2026	
December	Dangal	₹1,914–2,024 crore	2016	

== Highest-grossing films by year ==
Year	Title	Studio
2000	Mohabbatein	Yash Raj Films
2001	Kabhi Khushi Kabhie Gham	Dharma Productions
2002	Devdas	Mega Bollywood
2003	Kal Ho Naa Ho	Dharma Productions
2004	Veer-Zaara	Yash Raj Films
2005	No Entry	Sahara Movie Studios
2006	Dhoom 2	Yash Raj Films
2007	Om Shanti Om	Red Chillies Entertainment
2008	Ghajini	Geetha Arts
2009	3 Idiots	Vinod Chopra Films
2010	Dabangg	Arbaaz Khan Productions; Shree Ashtavinayak Cine Vision
2011	Bodyguard	Reliance Entertainment
2012	Ek Tha Tiger	Yash Raj Films
2013	Dhoom 3	Yash Raj Films
2014	PK	Vinod Chopra Films; Rajkumar Hirani Films
2015	Bajrangi Bhaijaan	Salman Khan Films; Kabir Khan Films; Eros International
2016	Dangal	Aamir Khan Productions; UTV Motion Pictures; Walt Disney Studios India
2017	Secret Superstar	Aamir Khan Productions
2018	Sanju	Rajkumar Hirani Films; Vinod Chopra Films
2019	War	Yash Raj Films
2020	Tanhaji	Ajay Devgn FFilms; T-Series
2021	Sooryavanshi	Reliance Entertainment; Rohit Shetty Picturez; Dharma Productions; Cape Of Good Films
2022	Brahmāstra: Part One – Shiva	Dharma Productions
2023	Jawan	Red Chillies Entertainment
2024	Stree 2	Maddock Films; Jio Studios
2025	Dhurandhar	Jio Studios; B62 Studios
2026	Dhurandhar: The Revenge	Jio Studios; B62 Studios

== Highest-grossing franchises ==
The Khiladi franchise was the first film franchise to gross over ₹100 crore, the YRF Spy Universe is the first franchise to collect over ₹1000 crore at the box office, Dhurandhar is the only franchise where all the films have grossed more than ₹1,000 crore worldwide.

Highest-grossing franchises

Rank	Franchise	Worldwide gross (crore)	No. of films	Average gross (crore)	Highest grosser

1	YRF Spy Universe	₹3,292.83	7	₹470	Pathaan (₹1,050.30–1,052.50 crore)
1	Pathaan (2023)	₹1,050.30			
2	Tiger Zinda Hai (2017)	₹565.10			
3	War (2019)	₹474.79			
4	Tiger 3 (2023)	₹466.63			
5	Ek Tha Tiger (2012)	₹334.39			
6	War 2 (2025)	₹303			
7	Alpha (2026)	₹98.62			

2	Dhurandhar	₹3,202.93	2	₹1,601	Dhurandhar: The Revenge (₹1,852.10 crore)
1	Dhurandhar: The Revenge (2026)	₹1,852.10			
2	Dhurandhar (2025)	₹1,350.83			

3	Maddock Horror Comedy Universe	₹1,447.19	5	₹289	Stree 2 (₹874.58 crore)
1	Stree 2 (2024)	₹874.58			
2	Stree (2018)	₹180.76			
3	Thamma (2025)	₹169.75			
4	Munjya (2024)	₹132.13			
5	Bhediya (2022)	₹89.97			

4	Rohit Shetty's Cop Universe	₹1,413.9	5	₹283	Simmba (₹391.68–400.19 crore)
1	Simmba (2018) (Note: Simmba's reported worldwide grosses vary between ₹391.68 crore (Box Office India) – ₹400.61 crore (Bollywood Hungama))	₹391.68			
2	Singham Again (2024) (Note: Singham Again's reported worldwide grosses vary between ₹367 crore (Pinkvilla) – ₹389.64 crore (Bollywood Hungama))	₹367			
3	Sooryavanshi (2022)	₹294.91			
4	Singham Returns (2014)	₹219			
5	Singham (2011)	₹141.31			

5	Drishyam	₹1,054.7	3	₹352	Drishyam: The Conclusion (₹574.65 crore)
1	Drishyam: The Conclusion	₹574.65			
2	Drishyam 2	₹345.05			
3	Drishyam	₹135			

6	Housefull	₹1,013.01	5	₹203	Housefull 4 (₹280.27 crore)
1	Housefull 4 (2019)	₹280.27			
2	Housefull 5 (2025)	₹242.80			
3	Housefull 3 (2016)	₹194.48			
4	Housefull 2 (2012)	₹179.15			
5	Housefull (2010)	₹116.31			

7	Gadar	₹798.73	2	₹399	Gadar 2 (₹687–691.08 crore)
1	Gadar 2 (2023)	₹687			
2	Ek Prem Katha (2001)	₹111.73			

8	Bhool Bhulaiyaa	₹773.57	3	₹258	Bhool Bhulaiyaa 3 (₹371–423.85 crore)
1	Bhool Bhulaiyaa 3 (2024)	₹423.85			
2	Bhool Bhulaiyaa 2 (2022) (Note: Bhool Bhulaiyaa 2's reported worldwide grosses vary between ₹263.81 crore (Box Office India) – ₹266.88 crore (Bollywood Hungama))	₹266.88			
3	Bhool Bhulaiyaa (2007) (Note: Bhool Bhulaiyaa's reported worldwide grosses vary between ₹82.35 crore (Bollywood Hungama) – ₹82.84 crore (Box Office India))	₹82.84			

9	Dhoom	₹754.42	3	₹251	Dhoom 3 (₹556.74 crore)
1	Dhoom 3 (2013)	₹556.74			
2	Dhoom 2 (2006)	₹149.98			
3	Dhoom (2004)	₹47.70			

10	Dabangg	₹686.34	3	₹229	Dabangg 2 (₹249.24 crore)
1	Dabangg 2 (2012)	₹249.24			
2	Dabangg (2010)	₹219.27			
3	Dabangg 3 (2019)	₹217.83			

11	Golmaal	₹668.74	5	₹134	Golmaal Again (₹310.98 crore)
1	Golmaal Again (2017)	₹310.98			
2	Golmaal 3 (2010)	₹169.56			
3	Golmaal Returns (2008)	₹80			
4	Cirkus (2022)	₹61.47			
5	Fun Unlimited (2006)	₹46.73			

12	Krrish	₹628.14	3	₹209	Krrish 3 (₹393 crore)
1	Krrish 3 (2013)	₹393			
2	Krrish (2006)	₹126.56			
3	Koi... Mil Gaya (2003)	₹108.58			

13	Baaghi	₹579.43	4	₹145	Baaghi 2 (₹250.15 crore)
1	Baaghi 2 (2018)	₹250.15			
2	Baaghi 3 (2020)	₹135.92			
3	Baaghi (2016)	₹126.97			
4	Baaghi 4 (2025)	₹66.39			

14	Dhamaal	₹573.1	4	₹143	Total Dhamaal (₹227.21–228.27 crore)
1	Total Dhamaal (2018) (Note: Total Dhamaal's reported worldwide grosses vary between ₹227.21 crore (Box Office India) – ₹228.27 crore (Bollywood Hungama))	₹227.21			
2	Dhamaal 4	₹224.61			
3	Double Dhamaal (2016)	₹70.55			
4	Dhamaal	₹50.73			

15	Race	₹570.15	3	₹190	Race 3 (₹305.16 crore)
1	Race 3 (2018)	₹305.16			
2	Race 2 (2013)	₹161.54			
3	Race (2008)	₹103.45			

16	Raid	₹395.3	2	₹198	Raid 2 (₹241.68 crore)
1	Raid 2 (2025)	₹241.68			
2	Raid (2018)	₹153.62			

17	Jolly LLB	₹384.33	3	₹128	Jolly LLB 2 (₹197.34 crore)
1	Jolly LLB 2 (2017)	₹197.34			
2	Jolly LLB 3 (2025)	₹138.29			
3	Jolly LLB (2013)	₹48.7			

18	OMG	₹370.98	2	₹185	OMG 2 (₹221.08 crore)
1	OMG – Oh My God! (2012)	₹149.90			
2	OMG 2 (2023)	₹221.08			

19	Kesari	₹349.09	2	₹175	Kesari (₹207.09 crore)
1	Kesari (2019)	₹207.09			
2	Chapter 2 (2025)	₹142			

20	Dream Girl	₹341.36	2	₹171	Dream Girl (₹200.8 crore)
1	Dream Girl (2019)	₹200.8			
2	Dream Girl 2 (2023)	₹140.56			

21	Medium	₹335.94	2	₹168	Hindi Medium (₹322.40 crore)
1	Hindi Medium (2017)	₹322.40			
2	Angrezi Medium (2020)	₹13.54			

22	Don	₹316.15	3	₹105	Don 2 (₹202.81 crore)
1	Don 2 (2011)	₹202.81			
2	Don (2006)	₹106.34			
3	Don (1978)	₹7			

== See also ==
- Hindi cinema content lists
- List of highest-grossing Indian films
  - List of highest-grossing Indian Bengali films
  - List of highest-grossing Marathi films
  - List of highest-grossing Punjabi films
  - List of highest-grossing Kannada films
  - List of highest-grossing Malayalam films
  - List of highest-grossing Tamil films
  - List of highest-grossing Telugu films
- List of highest-grossing films in India
- List of most expensive Indian films
- Lists of Indian films
