= Zee Cine Award for Best Film =

Annual film award in India

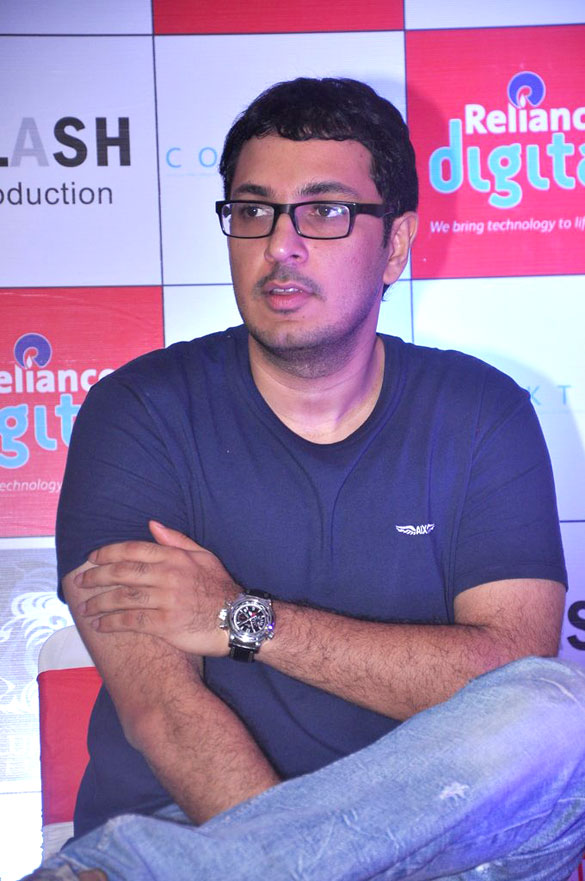
- The 2026 recipient: Dinesh Vijan for Chhaava
- Awarded for: Best Film
- Country: India
- Presented by: Zee
- First award: Dil to Pagal Hai (1998)
- Currently held by: Chhaava (2026)

The Zee Cine Award Best Film is chosen via the public of India. The winners are announced in June.

== Winners and nominees ==
Table key
‡	Indicates the winner

Year (Note: Refers to the year in which the ceremony was held.)	Film	Production House / Studio	Ref.
1998 (1st)	Dil To Pagal Hai ‡	Yash Raj Films	
1998 (1st)	Border	J. P. Films	
1998 (1st)	Gupt	Trimurti Films	
1998 (1st)	Ishq	Baba Films	
1998 (1st)	Pardes	Mukta Arts Ltd.	
1999 (2nd)	Kuch Kuch Hota Hai ‡	Dharma Productions	
1999 (2nd)	Jab Pyaar Kisise Hota Hai	Tips Industries	
1999 (2nd)	Pyaar Kiya To Darna Kya	Pooja Entertainment, GS Worldwide Entertainment, Sohail Khan Productions	
1999 (2nd)	Pyaar To Hona Hi Tha	Baba Films	
1999 (2nd)	Satya	RGV Production House	
2000 (3rd)	Hum Dil De Chuke Sanam ‡	SLB Films	
2000 (3rd)	———		
2001 (4th)	Kaho Naa... Pyaar Hai ‡	Filmkraft Productions Pvt. Ltd	
2001 (4th)	———		
2002 (5th)	Lagaan ‡	Aamir Khan Productions	
2002 (5th)	———		
2003 (6th)	Devdas ‡	Mega Bollywood	
2003 (6th)	———		
2004 (7th)	Koi... Mil Gaya ‡	Filmkraft Productions Pvt. Ltd	
2004 (7th)	Baghban	B. R. Films	
2004 (7th)	Chalte Chalte	Dreamz Unlimited, UTV Motion Pictures	
2004 (7th)	Kal Ho Naa Ho	Dharma Productions	
2004 (7th)	Munna Bhai M.B.B.S.	Vinod Chopra Films	
2005 (8th)	Veer-Zaara ‡	Yash Raj Films	
2005 (8th)	———		
2006 (9th)	Black ‡	SLB Films, Applause Entertainment	
2006 (9th)	Apaharan	Prakash Jha Productions	
2006 (9th)	Bunty Aur Babli	Yash Raj Films	
2006 (9th)	No Entry	Sahara One Motion Pictures	
2006 (9th)	Parineeta	Vinod Chopra Films	
2006 (9th)	Salaam Namaste	Yash Raj Films	
2006 (9th)	Sarkar	RGV Film Company	
2007 (10th)	Rang De Basanti ‡	Rakeysh Omprakash Mehra Pictures	
2007 (10th)	Kabhi Alvida Naa Kehna	Dharma Productions	
2007 (10th)	Krrish	Filmkraft Productions Pvt. Ltd	
2007 (10th)	Lage Raho Munna Bhai	Vinod Chopra Films	
2007 (10th)	Omkara	Shemaroo Entertainment	
2007 (10th)	Vivah	Rajshri Productions	
2008 (11th)	Chak De! India ‡	Yash Raj Films	
2008 (11th)	Guru	Madras Talkies	
2008 (11th)	Jab We Met	Shree Ashtavinayak Cine Vision	
2008 (11th)	Life in a... Metro	Ishana Movies	
2008 (11th)	Om Shanti Om	Red Chillies Entertainment	
2008 (11th)	Taare Zameen Par	Aamir Khan Productions	
2009 (–)	Not Awarded		
2010 (–)	Not Awarded		
2011 (12th)	Dabangg ‡	Shree Ashtavinayak Cine Vision, Arbaaz Khan Productions	
2011 (12th)	Golmaal 3	Shree Ashtavinayak Cine Vision	
2011 (12th)	My Name Is Khan	Dharma Productions, Red Chillies Entertainment	
2011 (12th)	Once Upon a Time in Mumbaai	Balaji Motion Pictures	
2011 (12th)	Peepli Live	Aamir Khan Productions	
2011 (12th)	Raajneeti	Prakash Jha Productions, Walkwater Media Ltd	
2012 (13th)	Zindagi Na Milegi Dobara ‡	Excel Entertainment	
2012 (13th)	Bodyguard	Reel Life Productions	
2012 (13th)	Don 2	Excel Entertainment, Red Chillies Entertainment	
2012 (13th)	Rockstar	Eros International, Shree Ashtavinayak Cine Vision	
2012 (13th)	Singham	Reliance Entertainment	
2012 (13th)	The Dirty Picture	Balaji Motion Pictures	
2013 (14th)	Barfi! ‡	UTV Motion Pictures, Ishana Movies	
2013 (14th)	Agneepath	Dharma Productions	
2013 (14th)	English Vinglish	Hope Productions	
2013 (14th)	Kahaani	Boundscript Motion Pictures	
2013 (14th)	Paan Singh Tomar	UTV Spotboy	
2014 (15th)	Chennai Express ‡	Red Chillies Entertainment, UTV Motion Pictures	
2014 (15th)	Aashiqui 2	T-Series Films, Vishesh Films	
2014 (15th)	Bhaag Milkha Bhaag	ROMP Pictures	
2014 (15th)	Dhoom 3	Yash Raj Films	
2014 (15th)	Goliyon Ki Raasleela Ram-Leela	Eros International, Bhansali Productions	
2014 (15th)	Yeh Jawaani Hai Deewani	Dharma Productions	
2015 (–)	Not Awarded		
2016 (16th)	Bajrangi Bhaijaan ‡	Rockline Entertainments, Salman Khan Films	
2016 (16th)	Baby	Friday Filmworks, T-Series Films, Cape Of Good Films, Crouching Tiger	
2016 (16th)	Badlapur	Maddock Films	
2016 (16th)	Bajirao Mastani	Eros International, Amber Entertainment, Bhansali Productions	
2016 (16th)	Piku	MSM Motion Pictures, Rising Sun Films, Saraswati Entertainment Creations	
2016 (16th)	Tanu Weds Manu: Returns	Colour Yellow Productions	
2017 (17th)	Airlift ‡	T-Series Films, Hari Om Entertainment, Cape of Good Films, Emmay Entertainment, Abundatia Entertainment, Viacom18 Motion Pictures	
2017 (17th)	M.S. Dhoni: The Untold Story	Friday Filmworks, Fox Star Studios, Inspired Entertainment	
2017 (17th)	Neerja	Fox Star Studios, Bling Unplugged	
2017 (17th)	Pink	Rising Sun Films	
2017 (17th)	Kapoor & Sons	Fox Star Studios, Dharma Productions	
2017 (17th)	Sultan	Yash Raj Films	
2018 (18th)	Toilet: Ek Prem Katha ‡	Viacom 18 Motion Pictures, KriArj Entertainment, Friday Filmworks, Plan C Studios, Cape of Good Films	
2018 (18th)	Badrinath Ki Dulhania	Dharma Productions	
2018 (18th)	Golmaal Again	Reliance Entertainment, Rohit Shetty Picturez, Mangal Murti Films	
2018 (18th)	Hindi Medium	Maddock Films, T-Series Films	
2018 (18th)	Jolly LLB 2	Fox Star Studios	
2018 (18th)	Secret Superstar	Aamir Khan Productions, Zee Studios	
2019 (19th)	Sanju ‡	Vinod Chopra Films, Rajkumar Hirani Films	
2019 (19th)	Badhaai Ho	Junglee Pictures, Chrome Pictures, Sradvn Production	
2019 (19th)	Padmaavat	Bhansali Productions, Viacom 18 Motion Pictures	
2019 (19th)	Simmba	Dharma Productions, Reliance Entertainment, Rohit Shetty Picturez	
2019 (19th)	Sonu Ke Titu Ki Sweety	T-Series Films, Luv Films	
2019 (19th)	Stree	Maddock Films, D2R Films	
2020 (20th)	Gully Boy ‡	Excel Entertainment, Tiger Baby Films	
2020 (20th)	Good Newwz	Dharma Productions, Cape of Good Films, Zee Studios	
2020 (20th)	Dream Girl	Balaji Motion Pictures	
2020 (20th)	Kabir Singh	T-Series, Cine1 Studios	
2020 (20th)	Uri: The Surgical Strike	RSVP Movies	
2020 (20th)	War	Yash Raj Films	
2021 (–)	Not Awarded due to COVID-19		
2022 (–)	Not Awarded due to COVID-19		
2023 (21st)	The Kashmir Files ‡	Zee Studios	
2023 (21st)	Bhool Bhulaiyaa 2	T-Series	
2023 (21st)	Brahmāstra: Part One – Shiva	Dharma Productions	
2023 (21st)	Drishyam 2	Panorama Studios, Viacom18 Studios, T-Series Films	
2023 (21st)	Gangubai Kathiawadi	Bhansali Productions, Pen India Limited	
2023 (21st)	Jugjugg Jeeyo	Dharma Productions	
2024 (22nd)	Gadar 2 ‡	Zee Studios	
2024 (22nd)	12th Fail	Vinod Chopra Films, Zee Studios	
2024 (22nd)	Animal	T-Series, Bhadrakali Pictures, Cine1 Studios	
2024 (22nd)	Jawan	Red Chillies Entertainment	
2024 (22nd)	Pathaan	Yash Raj Films	
2024 (22nd)	Rocky Aur Rani Kii Prem Kahaani	Dharma Productions, Viacom18 Studios	
2025 (23rd)	Stree 2 ‡	Maddock Films	
2025 (23rd)	Bhool Bhulaiyaa 3	T-Series, Cine1 Studios	
2025 (23rd)	Munjya	Maddock Films	
2025 (23rd)	Teri Baaton Mein Aisa Uljha Jiya	Maddock Films, Jio Studios	
2025 (23rd)	Article 370	B62 Studios, Jio Studios	
2025 (23rd)	Laapataa Ladies	Aamir Khan Productions, Kindling Pictures	
2026 (24th)	Chhaava‡	Maddock Films	
2026 (24th)	Saiyaara	Yash Raj Films	
2026 (24th)	Dhurandhar	B62 Studios Jio Studios	
2026 (24th)	Sitaare Zameen Par	Aamir Khan Productions	
2026 (24th)	Jolly LLB 3	Kangra Talkies	
2026 (24th)	Jaat	Mythri Movie Makers Zee Studios People Media Factory	

== See also ==
- Zee Cine Awards
- Bollywood
- Cinema of India
