= Maddock Films =

Indian private film production company

- Type: Private
- Industry: Entertainment
- Founded: June 2005; 21 years ago
- Founder: Dinesh Vijan; Pooja Vijan
- Headquarters: Mumbai, India
- Key people: Dinesh Vijan
- Products: Films
- Owner: Dinesh Vijan; Nepean Capital
- Subsidiaries: Illuminati Films; Maddock Outsider

Maddock Films is an Indian film production company founded by Indian producer and director Dinesh Vijan in 2005. Maddock has produced Hindi films such as Love Aaj Kal (2009), Cocktail (2012), Badlapur (2015), Hindi Medium (2017) and its sequel Angrezi Medium, Luka Chuppi (2019), Bala (2019), Mimi (2021), Zara Hatke Zara Bachke (2023) and Chhaava (2025).

They also have their own film universe called the Maddock Horror Comedy Universe which consists of Stree (2018), Stree 2 (2024), Bhediya (2022) and Munjya (2024) and Thamma (2025). The franchise has been commercially successful, having grossed a combined ₹1,186 crore against a combined budget of ₹235 crore.

== Films ==
Key
†	Denotes films that have not yet been released

List of films
Year	Title	Director	Cast	Ref.
2009	Love Aaj Kal	Imtiaz Ali	Saif Ali Khan, Deepika Padukone, Rishi Kapoor	
2012	Agent Vinod	Sriram Raghavan	Saif Ali Khan, Kareena Kapoor	
2012	Cocktail	Homi Adajania	Saif Ali Khan, Deepika Padukone, Diana Penty	
2013	Go Goa Gone	Raj & DK	Saif Ali Khan, Kunal Khemu, Vir Das, Anand Tiwari, Puja Gupta	
2014	Lekar Hum Deewana Dil	Arif Ali	Armaan Jain, Deeksha Seth	
2014	Finding Fanny	Homi Adajania	Arjun Kapoor, Deepika Padukone	
2014	Happy Ending	Raj & DK	Saif Ali Khan, Ileana D'Cruz	
2015	Badlapur	Sriram Raghavan	Varun Dhawan, Nawazuddin Siddiqui, Yami Gautam	
2017	Hindi Medium	Saket Chaudhary	Irrfan Khan, Saba Qamar	
2017	Raabta	Dinesh Vijan	Sushant Singh Rajput, Kriti Sanon	
2018	Stree	Amar Kaushik	Shraddha Kapoor, Rajkummar Rao	
2019	Luka Chuppi	Laxman Utekar	Kartik Aaryan, Kriti Sanon	
2019	Arjun Patiala	Rohit Jugraj Chauhan	Diljit Dosanjh, Kriti Sanon	
2019	Made In China	Mikhil Musale	Rajkummar Rao, Mouni Roy	
2019	Bala	Amar Kaushik	Ayushmann Khurrana, Yami Gautam, Bhumi Pednekar	
2020	Love Aaj Kal	Imtiaz Ali	Kartik Aaryan, Sara Ali Khan	
2020	Angrezi Medium	Homi Adajania	Irrfan Khan, Radhika Madan, Kareena Kapoor Khan	
2021	Roohi	Hardik Mehta	Rajkummar Rao, Varun Sharma, Janhvi Kapoor	
2021	Mimi (Note: Released on JioCinema and Netflix.)	Laxman Utekar	Kriti Sanon, Pankaj Tripathi, Sai Tamhankar	
2021	Shiddat (Note: Released on Disney+ Hotstar.)	Kunal Deshmukh	Sunny Kaushal, Radhika Madan, Mohit Raina, Diana Penty	
2021	Hum Do Hamare Do	Abhishek Jain	Rajkummar Rao, Kriti Sanon	
2022	Dasvi	Tushar Jalota	Abhishek Bachchan, Yami Gautam, Nimrat Kaur	
2022	Bhediya	Amar Kaushik	Varun Dhawan, Kriti Sanon	
2023	Chor Nikal Ke Bhaga (Note: Released on Netflix.)	Ajay Singh	Sunny Kaushal, Yami Gautam	
2023	Zara Hatke Zara Bachke	Laxman Utekar	Vicky Kaushal, Sara Ali Khan	
2023	Sajini Shinde Ka Viral Video	Mikhil Musale	Nimrat Kaur, Radhika Madan, Bhagyashree, Subodh Bhave, Sumeet Vyas, Chinmay Mandlekar	
2024	Teri Baaton Mein Aisa Uljha Jiya	Amit Joshi, Aradhana Sah	Shahid Kapoor, Kriti Sanon, Dharmendra, Dimple Kapadia	
2024	Murder Mubarak	Homi Adajania	Pankaj Tripathi, Sara Ali Khan, Vijay Varma, Karisma Kapoor, Kunal Khemu, Sanjay Kapoor	
2024	Munjya	Aditya Sarpotdar	Abhay Verma, Sharvari Wagh, Mona Singh, S. Sathyaraj	
2024	Stree 2	Amar Kaushik	Shraddha Kapoor, Rajkummar Rao, Pankaj Tripathi, Abhishek Banerjee, Aparshakti Khurana	
2024	Sector 36	Aditya Nimbalkar	Deepak Dobriyal, Vikrant Massey	
2025	Sky Force	Sandeep Kewlani, Abhishek Anil Kapur	Akshay Kumar, Veer Pahariya, Sara Ali Khan, Nimrat Kaur	
2025	Chhaava	Laxman Utekar	Vicky Kaushal, Akshaye Khanna, Rashmika Mandanna	
2025	Bhool Chuk Maaf	Karan Sharma	Rajkummar Rao, Wamiqa Gabbi	
2025	Tehran (Note: Released on ZEE5 and Netflix.)	Arun Gopalan	John Abraham, Neeru Bajwa, Manushi Chhillar	
2025	Param Sundari	Tushar Jalota	Sidharth Malhotra, Janhvi Kapoor	
2025	Thamma	Aditya Sarpotdar	Ayushmann Khurrana, Rashmika Mandanna, Nawazuddin Siddiqui, Paresh Rawal	
2026	Ikkis	Sriram Raghavan	Dharmendra, Agastya Nanda, Jaideep Ahlawat, Simar Bhatia	
2026	Cocktail 2	Homi Adajania	Shahid Kapoor, Kriti Sanon, Rashmika Mandanna	
2026	Pooja Meri Jaan (Note: Released on ZEE5.)	Navjot Gulati	Mrunal Thakur, Huma Qureshi, Vikram Singh Chauhan, Vijay Raaz	
2026	Prahaar: The Untold Story of Ujjwal Nikam	Avinash Arun	Rajkummar Rao, Wamiqa Gabbi, Sikandar Kher, Jaideep Ahlawat, Ashish Vidyarthi, Lalit Prabhakar, Ritvik Sahore	
2026	Eetha †	Laxman Utekar	Shraddha Kapoor, Randeep Hooda, Mohammed Zeeshan Ayyub, Siddharth Jadhav, Ishtiyak Khan, Anant Joshi	
2026	Sarvagunn Sampann †	Sonali Rattan Deshmukh	Vaani Kapoor, Ishwak Singh	
2027	Shakti Shalini †	Aditya Sarpotdar	Aneet Padda, Vishal Jethwa, Vineet Kumar Singh, Nana Patekar	

== Television ==
List of television credits
Year	Title	Ref.
2021	Chutzpah	
2023	Saas, Bahu Aur Flamingo	
2023	Jee Karda	

== See also ==
- Maddock Horror Comedy Universe
