= Stree 2 =

2024 Indian film by Amar Kaushik

- Theatrical release poster
- Directed by: Amar Kaushik
- Written by: Niren Bhatt
- Based on: Stree by Raj & DK
- Produced by: Dinesh Vijan; Jyoti Deshpande
- Starring: Shraddha Kapoor; Rajkummar Rao; Pankaj Tripathi; Abhishek Banerjee; Aparshakti Khurana; Tamannaah Bhatia
- Cinematography: Jishnu Bhattacharjee
- Edited by: Hemanti Sarkar
- Music by: Songs: Sachin–Jigar; Score: Justin Varghese
- Production companies: Maddock Films; Jio Studios
- Distributed by: PVR Inox Pictures; Pen Marudhar
- Release date: 15 August 2024
- Running time: 143 minutes
- Country: India
- Language: Hindi
- Budget: ₹50–105 crore (Note: Stree 2's reported budget varies between ₹50 crore (India Today) – ₹60 crore (DNA India and The Financial Express) – ₹90 crore (Hindustan Times) – ₹105 crore (Bollywood Hungama))
- Box office: ₹874.58 crore

Stree 2: Sarkate Ka Aatank (transl. The Woman 2: Terror of the Headless) is a 2024 Indian Hindi-language comedy horror film directed by Amar Kaushik, written by Niren Bhatt and produced jointly by Maddock Films and Jio Studios. A sequel to Stree (2018), which spawned the Maddock Horror Comedy Universe, it serves as the fourth instalment in the franchise. The film stars Shraddha Kapoor, Rajkummar Rao, Pankaj Tripathi, Abhishek Banerjee, and Aparshakti Khurana as a group of friends who must defeat Sarkata, a headless malevolent entity abducting the women of Chanderi.

Kaushik expressed interest in a sequel to Stree in November 2018; in February 2022, Rao confirmed that the project was in development, but original writers and producers Raj & DK were no longer involved, having parted ways with producer Dinesh Vijan over disputes regarding the rights to the franchise. Vijan officially announced the sequel and Jyoti Deshpande in April 2023, with Bhatt, who had written past instalments Bhediya (2022) and Munjya (2024), taking over as writer; Raj & DK were, nonetheless, credited for the sequel's characters. Principal photography began in July of the same year, primarily taking place in Chanderi and Bihar, and concluded by mid-2024. The soundtrack album was composed by Sachin–Jigar, with Justin Varghese taking over duties for the background score from Ketan Sodha for the 2018 original. Hemanti Sarkar returned as editor, while Jishnu Bhattacharjee took over as cinematographer from the prequel, replacing Amalendu Chaudhary.

Stree 2 was theatrically released worldwide on 15 August 2024, coinciding with Independence Day, and received positive reviews from critics. The film grossed over ₹875 crore (equivalent to ₹932 crore or US$97 million in 2026) worldwide, emerging as the third highest-grossing Indian film and the highest-grossing Hindi film of 2024, as well as the seventh highest-grossing Hindi film and the twelfth highest-grossing Indian film of all time.

Stree 2 received 14 nominations at the 70th Filmfare Awards including Best Film, Best Director (Kaushik), Best Actor (Rao) and Best Actress (Kapoor), winning Best Female Playback Singer (Madhubanti Bagchi for "Aaj Ki Raat").

== Plot ==
After Stree ceases haunting Chanderi, a headless demon named Sarkata emerges and abducts an unaccompanied woman. A few years later, the townsfolk of Chanderi worship Stree and believe that the women whom Sarkata abducted over the past few years left their homes in search of better opportunities. Meanwhile, Rudra receives an anonymous envelope containing several missing pages from the "Chanderi Puran" and a message stating, "Vo Aayega" (transl. He will come). He promptly confides in Vicky, who brushes him off.

The townsfolk become aware of Sarkata's existence after he abducts Bittu's girlfriend, Chitti. The enigmatic woman, who vanished from the bus, briefly reappears before Vicky and warns him about Sarkata. Vicky, Rudra and Bittu examine the missing pages of the 'Chanderi Puran' and discover that Sarkata is the malevolent ghost of Chandrabhan, a former chieftain of Chanderi who murdered Stree and her partner while their young daughter watched helplessly. He was later killed by Stree but was destined to return from the dead after her supposed departure from the town; he despises progressive women and targets them. Realising that they need Stree's assistance to defeat him, Vicky and Bittu meet Jana, who was once a medium for Stree, at the residence of his werewolf cousin Bhaskar, and convince him to return home. (Note: As depicted in Bhediya.)

They search for Stree at her lair, where Sarkata attacks Jana and the latter briefly undergoes an out-of-body experience; his soul visits Sarkata's lair, where he finds the missing women, including Chitti. His soul returns to his body, and the group flees the fort with Sarkata in pursuit. The woman appears again and fights Sarkata, having acquired Stree's powers through her braid, but he destroys Stree's statue to assert his authority. The women of the town fear being abducted and urge Vicky to find a solution. The woman encourages Vicky and reminds him that he is the town's saviour. She gives him a mystical dagger capable of killing Sarkata. To lure Sarkata out, they arrange a dance performance by Rudra's beautiful lover, Shama, who runs a dance troupe outside Chanderi. Sarkata appears to abduct her after her performance, but Vicky fails to muster the courage to kill him; Sarkata subsequently enchants the men of the town and abducts Shama, devastating Rudra. Elsewhere, the bewitched men become chauvinistic and begin dominating the women in their homes.

Desperate to save the town, the group traces the writer of the letter to a mental asylum, where they realise that he is Sarkata's descendant. He reveals that Sarkata can only be defeated by a person who is neither solely a man nor solely a woman, but both. The woman temporarily merges her soul with Vicky, and they enter Sarkata's lair. They confront Sarkata and sever his head, but each dismembered part forms a new Sarkata and spreads terror. Bhaskar comes to their rescue, but they are still overwhelmed by Sarkata. Having no other choice, the woman calls for Stree, who is revealed to be her mother. Stree arrives and seemingly kills Sarkata by dragging him into lava, freeing the abducted women and disenchanting the men of Chanderi. While the townsfolk celebrate, the woman reveals to Vicky that she is a ghost and that her true purpose is to help her mother attain salvation. She finally whispers her name into Vicky's ear and promises that they will meet again.

In a post-credits scene, following his fight with Sarkata, Bhaskar finds himself stranded naked in a jungle. Jana brings him clothes (Note: As depicted in Munjya.) and learns from Bhaskar that a creature, apparently a vampire, has been wreaking havoc in Delhi. Elsewhere, Sarkata's remains reach his descendant at the mental asylum, and Sarkata's ghost possesses him, implying his return.

== Cast ==
- Shraddha Kapoor as a phantasm with undisclosed name; (Note: A script leak tells her name to be Gayatri, but was not revealed in film.) the character is billed in the end credits as She (Stree's Daughter)
- Rajkummar Rao as Vikrant Vicky Prashar
- Pankaj Tripathi as Rudra, the librarian
- Aparshakti Khurana as Bittu
- Abhishek Banerjee as Jana
- Anya Singh as Chitti, Bittu's girlfriend
- Atul Srivastava as Vicky's father
- Mushtaq Khan as MLA
- Sunita Rajwar as Jana's mother
- Arvind Bilgaiyan as Jana's father
- Bhumi Rajgor as Stree (Rajgor replaces Flora Saini from the original)
- Sunil Kumar as Chandrabhan / Sarkata
- Aakash Dabhade as Narendra, Jana's friend
- Simran Sharma as Mamata, Narendra's wife
- Ajay Pal as a postman
- Mustaqueem Khan as Durga
- Badriprasad Chavan as Lokesh
- Vipasha Arvind as Anju Bhabhi

Special appearances

- Akshay Kumar as Sarkata’s descendant
- Varun Dhawan as Bhaskar / Bhediya
- Tamannaah Bhatia as Shama, a professional dancer and Rudra's love interest
- Amar Kaushik as homeless beggar; Kaushik also appears briefly in the song "Aaj Ki Raat"

== Production ==
=== Development ===
In October 2018, following the success of Stree, Amar Kaushik announced plans for a sequel. The project, produced by Raj and DK alongside Dinesh Vijan, was initially set to begin filming in 2019. According to producer Vijan, the sequel would delve into Shraddha Kapoor’s character's backstory and answer several unanswered questions from the first film. The original cast would return, with new additions, and the narrative would primarily focus on the characters played by Rajkummar Rao and Kapoor.

However, script development continued throughout 2019, with filming postponed to 2020; in the meantime, Raj & DK distanced themselves from the sequel after a fallout with Vijan over the rights to Stree. In February 2022, Rao confirmed the sequel's development. By October 2022, Kapoor also confirmed that shooting would commence soon. That same month, it was reported that Kaushik and his team had finalised the storyline for the sequel, which would continue from where the first film left off.

In March 2023, the film entered pre-production, with filming scheduled to start in July 2023. In April 2023, Jio Studios joined as co-producers. The filmmakers announced that the sequel is set for release on 30 August 2024.

=== Casting ===
Rao, Kapoor, Pankaj Tripathi, Abhishek Banerjee, and Aparshakti Khurana reprise their respective roles, with Tripathi returning as Rudra, Banerjee as Jana, Khurana as Bittu, and Sunita Rajwar as Jana's mother. Tamannaah Bhatia makes a special appearance in a song, while Varun Dhawan features in a cameo, reprising his role from Bhediya. According to a report from Hindustan Times, Akshay Kumar would be appearing in a cameo.

=== Filming ===
Principal photography began on 10 July 2023, with the initial shoot taking place in Chanderi. Filming schedules were adjusted to accommodate Pankaj Tripathi's commitments to his role in Main Atal Hoon (2024). The first schedule concluded within the same month. The second schedule commenced in November 2023, with the crew relocating to Madhya Pradesh for additional filming. In December 2023, scenes were shot in Indore, and a dance number featuring Tamannaah Bhatia was filmed in Bihar, choreographed by Vijay Ganguly. In January 2024, the production moved to an old fort in Bhopal. Varun Dhawan joined the set in February 2024 to film a guest appearance at a Mumbai studio, reprising his role from Bhediya (2022).

=== Post-production ===
The Central Board of Film Certification (CBFC) did not mandate any visual cuts for Stree 2. However, the board requested two audio modifications: the removal of a celebrity's name and the muting of a national monument's name. After these changes, the film was granted a U/A rating and has a runtime of 149 minutes. One improvised scene involved Rajkummar Rao singing "Calm Down" by Rema and Selena Gomez, which led to the producers paying ₹25 lakh in residuals.

== Music ==
The film's music was composed by Sachin–Jigar, with lyrics written by Amitabh Bhattacharya, replacing Vayu from the original, and the background score by Justin Varghese in his second Hindi film, replacing Ketan Sodha from the original. The soundtrack, distributed by Saregama, consisted of four original tracks, namely "Aaj Ki Raat", "Khoobsurat", "Aayi Nai" and "Tumhare Hi Rahenge Hum"—all of which were released as singles.

== Marketing ==
The teaser for Stree 2 premiered in theatres during the end credits of Munjya on 14 June, and was later released on social media on 25 June 2024. The trailer of the film was released on 18 July 2024 and received over 10 million views across platforms within 24 hours.

== Release ==
=== Theatrical ===
Stree 2 was initially scheduled for a worldwide theatrical release on 30 August 2024, but was later rescheduled to premiere on Independence Day. The day before its release, nearly 3,000 paid preview night shows were held.

=== Home media ===
The film began streaming on Amazon Prime Video from 10 October 2024.

== Reception ==
=== Box office ===
Stree 2 grossed ₹9.40 crore from paid previews in select theatres the day before its official release, which was the highest ever for a Hindi film at the time, breaking the previous record set by Chennai Express (2013). The record was later surpassed by Dhurandhar: The Revenge, which grossed ₹75 crore from paid previews. Released on Independence Day alongside Vedaa and Khel Khel Mein, the film earned ₹64.80 crore on its opening day, making it the second-highest opening day for a Hindi film, only behind Jawan (2023). It marked the highest opening of Rajkummar Rao's career and the second-highest for Shraddha Kapoor, following Saaho (2019). Worldwide, the film crossed ₹100 crore on its second day, the ₹300 crore mark on its eighth day and the ₹400 crore mark in its first week. Additionally, it surpassed the earnings of Stree on its third day. In its fifth week, the film earned an additional ₹16 crore, setting a record for the highest fifth-week collection in Indian cinema history.

Internationally, the film debuted within the top 10 at the US domestic box office with an opening gross of $2.57 million. It also became the eleventh Indian film to cross A$2 million in Australia and crossed £1 million in the United Kingdom, the first for an Indian horror film. Box Office India reported that the film did particularly well overseas despite the fact it did not have a prominent male lead.

As of 10 October 2024, the film has grossed ₹739.40 crore in India and ₹134.30 crore internationally, bringing its total worldwide gross to ₹875 crore.

=== Critical response ===
Stree 2 received positive reviews from Indian critics, who praised its blend of horror and comedy, performances, and sharp dialogue, though some found the sequel lacking in novelty. On the review aggregator website Rotten Tomatoes, 57% of 14 critics' reviews are positive, with an average rating of 6.1/10.

A critic for Bollywood Hungama rated the film 4.5 out of 5, calling it "the birth of a successful franchise" and highlighting its seamless mix of humour and horror. Similarly, Simran Khan of Times Now awarded it 4 out of 5, describing it as a "well-packaged entertainer" with a standout performance from Rajkummar Rao, while also commending Shraddha Kapoor and Pankaj Tripathi. Though she noted a predictable climax, she emphasised that the film effectively balances horror and comedy, making it an engaging watch.

Abhishek Srivastava of The Times of India echoed this sentiment, also rating it 4 out of 5 and calling it "a headless wonder that's got humour in spades." He praised the film's clever script and its introduction of a male villain, Sarkata, though he found the second half to suffer from pacing issues. Tushar Joshi of India Today rated it 3.5 out of 5, describing it as a "multiverse of madness" that is entertaining but occasionally struggles with coherence. He pointed out the film's improved visual effects and praised its performances, particularly Rao's and a cameo by Akshay Kumar.

Like Srivastava, Rishabh Suri of Hindustan Times believed the sequel surpassed the original, writing that “Rajkummar Rao leads a sequel that's better than the original; Abhishek Banerjee is the highlight.” Suri appreciated the film's blend of humour with social commentary, particularly its take on patriarchal constraints, and praised the sharp dialogue and Banerjee's performance. Sukanya Verma of Rediff.com rated it 3 out of 5, noting that while the film capitalises on the goodwill of the original and the camaraderie among the actors, its "spirited return" has its highs and lows.

Shilajit Mitra of The Hindu offered a more mixed review, remarking that while Rao, Kapoor, and the ensemble deliver laughs, the film “feels like a factory-made sequel.” He found that it retained the charm of the original but sacrificed its nuanced social commentary in favour of franchise expansion. Similarly, Pratiksha Mishra of The Quint criticised the film's visual effects, stating that they made the antagonist, Sarkata, appear "less menacing and more cartoonish," which undercut the intended horror.

Saibal Chatterjee of NDTV India was more critical, rating the film 2.5 out of 5 and commenting that "Shraddha Kapoor's film is bemusing rather than petrifying." He felt that while the sequel builds on the success of its predecessor, its reliance on predictable humour and outdated tropes made it feel repetitive despite moments of creativity.

== Accolades ==
Year	Award	Category	Nominee/Work	Result	Ref.
2025	25th IIFA Awards	Best Film	Stree 2 – Sarkate Ka Aatank	Nominated	
2025	25th IIFA Awards	Best Director	Amar Kaushik	Nominated	
2025	25th IIFA Awards	Best Actress	Shraddha Kapoor	Nominated	
2025	25th IIFA Awards	Best Supporting Actor	Abhishek Banerjee	Nominated	
2025	25th IIFA Awards	Best Music Director	Sachin–Jigar	Nominated	
2025	25th IIFA Awards	Best Female Playback Singer	Madhubanti Bagchi for "Aaj Ki Raat"	Nominated	
2025	70th Filmfare Awards	Best Film	Stree 2 – Sarkate Ka Aatank	Nominated	
2025	70th Filmfare Awards	Best Director	Amar Kaushik	Nominated	
2025	70th Filmfare Awards	Best Actor	Rajkummar Rao	Nominated	
2025	70th Filmfare Awards	Best Actress	Shraddha Kapoor	Nominated	
2025	70th Filmfare Awards	Best Supporting Actor	Pankaj Tripathi	Nominated	
2025	70th Filmfare Awards	Best Story	Niren Bhatt	Nominated	
2025	70th Filmfare Awards	Best Screenplay	Niren Bhatt	Nominated	
2025	70th Filmfare Awards	Best Dialogue	Niren Bhatt	Nominated	
2025	70th Filmfare Awards	Best Male Playback Singer	Pawan Singh	Nominated	
2025	70th Filmfare Awards	Best Music Director	Sachin–Jigar	Nominated	
2025	70th Filmfare Awards	Best Female Playback Singer	Madhubanti Bagchi	Won	
2025	70th Filmfare Awards	Best Editing	Hemanti Sarkar	Nominated	
2025	70th Filmfare Awards	Best Choreography	Vijay Ganguly	Nominated	
2025	70th Filmfare Awards	Best Special Effects	Digital Domain	Nominated	
