= Sandeep Singh (producer) =

Indian film producer

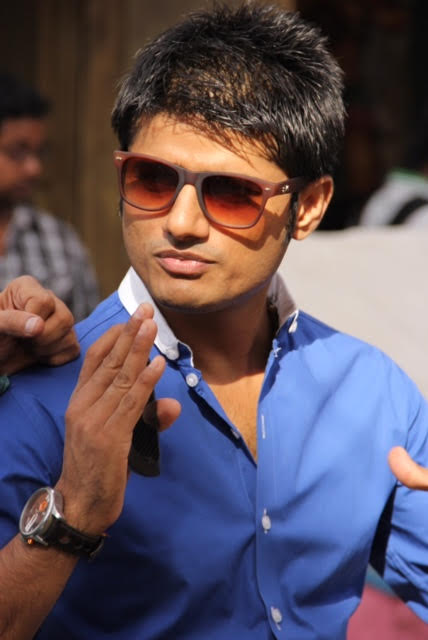
- Singh in 2015
- Born: 28 September 1984
- Other name: Sandeep Singh
- Occupation: Film producer Film Director
- Years active: 2001–present
- Organization: Legend Studios
- Known for: Mary Kom; Sarbjit; Bhoomi; PM Narendra Modi

Sandeep Singh is an Indian film producer who works in Hindi films. He started his career as a journalist and later joined Bhansali Productions as the CEO in 2011. He founded the film production company Legend Studios in 2015. Singh is known for producing movies like Mary Kom, Aligarh, Sarabjit, Bhoomi, PM Narendra Modi, and Jhund.

== Career ==
Singh began his career in 2001 with Times Group as an entertainment journalist and wrote columns and articles for both Bombay Times and Navbharat Times. During this time The Times Group started their own radio channel Radio Mirchi and Sandeep got his first opportunity to be a show producer. He was later appointed as the entertainment head at Radio Mirchi. He joined Radio City in 2005 as entertainment head and launched several shows. He moved into BIG FM as national entertainment head in 2007.

He produced his first independent show Dancing Queen in 2008 on Colors Channel with SOL Entertainment.

He joined Sanjay Leela Bhansali's production house Bhansali Productions as CEO in 2011. Whilst at Bhansali Productions he co-produced films Rowdy Rathore, Shirin Farhad Ki Toh Nikal Padi, Ram Leela, Mary Kom and a television series on Star Plus called Saraswatichandra (2013).

In 2015, he launched himself as an independent producer with the critically acclaimed film Aligarh, Sarbjit in 2016, Bhoomi in 2017, the biographical film PM Narendra Modi in 2019 and Jhund.

He acquired the rights to the biography of business tycoon Subrata Roy in July 2021. The same year, he also announced three films with a biography film titled Swatantra Veer Savarkar on the life of Vinayak Damodar Savarkar. In addition, he is producing a women-centric film titled White directed by Mahesh Manjrekar who is also directing a film on Nathuram Godse titled as Godse, He had also announced a film titled Bal Shivaji directed by Ravi Jadhav, Sandeep made his directorial debut with Safed starring Abhay Verma and Meera Chopra in lead roles. The film’s poster was launched by A. R. Rahman in cannes.

== Filmography ==
=== As co-producer ===
Year	Film
2012	Rowdy Rathore
2012	Shirin Farhad Ki Toh Nikal Padi
2013	Goliyon Ki Raasleela Ram-Leela
2014	Mary Kom
2015	Gabbar Is Back

=== As producer ===
Year	Film
2016	Aligarh
2016	Sarbjit
2017	Bhoomi
2019	PM Narendra Modi
2022	Jhund
2024	Main Atal Hoon
2024	Swatantrya Veer Savarkar

=== As director ===
Year	Film
2023	Safed

=== Television ===
Year	TV Show	Producer/Co-producer
2008	Dancing Queen	Producer
2013	Saraswatichandra	Co-producer
2024–present	Fauji 2	Producer
