= Stree (2018 film) =

2018 Indian film by Amar Kaushik

- Theatrical release poster
- Directed by: Amar Kaushik
- Written by: Story and Screenplay: Raj & DK; Dialogues: Sumit Arora
- Produced by: Dinesh Vijan; Raj & DK
- Starring: Shraddha Kapoor; Rajkummar Rao; Pankaj Tripathi; Aparshakti Khurana; Abhishek Banerjee
- Cinematography: Amalendu Chaudhary
- Edited by: Hemanti Sarkar
- Music by: Songs: Sachin–Jigar; Score: Ketan Sodha
- Production companies: Jio Studios; Maddock Films; D2R Films
- Distributed by: AA Films
- Release date: 31 August 2018
- Running time: 127 minutes
- Country: India
- Language: Hindi
- Budget: ₹23–25 crore
- Box office: est. ₹180.76 crore

Stree: Mard Ko Dard Hoga (transl. The Woman: Man will feel the pain) is a 2018 Indian Hindi-language comedy horror film directed by debutant Amar Kaushik and produced by Dinesh Vijan alongside writers Raj & DK in their production debut. Loosely based on the urban legend Naale Baa meaning "come tomorrow", it stars Shraddha Kapoor,Rajkummar Rao, Pankaj Tripathi, Aparshakti Khurana and Abhishek Banerjee.

Raj & DK approached Rao in late November 2017 to star in their debut production. To prepare for his role as a tailor, Rao learned to sew. Kapoor was confirmed as the female lead the following month. Kaushik, a first assistant director to Raj & DK on Vijan-produced Go Goa Gone (2013), was enlisted to direct the film in January 2018, making his debut. Principal photography began on 13 January 2018 in Chanderi, with additional filming in Bhopal and Mumbai. The final schedule was completed in May 2018. The soundtrack was composed by Raj & DK's norm collaborators Sachin–Jigar, with lyrics written by Vayu, Badshah and Jigar Saraiya. Aiming for a fresh sound, Raj & DK roped in Ketan Sodha to compose the background score, relieving Sachin-Jigar of score duties.

Stree was theatrically released worldwide on 31 August 2018 and received positive reviews from critics. The film grossed over ₹180.76 crore at the box office against a budget of ₹23–25 crore, becoming a major commercial success at the box-office. At the 64th Filmfare Awards, the film received 10 nominations, including Best Film, Best Director (Kaushik), Best Actor (Rao) and Best Supporting Actor (for both Khurana and Tripathi), winning Best Debut Director (Kaushik). It is the first instalment in Maddock Horror Comedy Universe followed by Bhediya (2022), Munjya (2024) and Thamma (2025). A sequel titled Stree 2 was released on Independence Day 2024, which was also a major commercial success at the box office.

== Plot ==
Within the town of Chanderi, locals believe in the legend of Stree, the spirit of a woman who abducts men during a four-day annual festival, leaving behind only their clothes. To protect themselves, townsfolk inscribe O Stree Kal Aana (transl. "O Stree, come tomorrow") on their walls and men refrain from going out after 10 PM.

Vicky, a ladies' tailor, meets a mysterious woman who asks him to stich a lehenga. He becomes infatuated with her, but his friend Bittu grows suspicious of her frequent disappearances and limited presence in the town. When their friend Jana is abducted, Vicky grows wary of the woman and, with Bittu and a local librarian named Rudra, investigates the legend. They find a partially burnt book titled Chanderi Puran, which reveals that Stree was once a beautiful courtesan who truly loved a man and was murdered by men in the town before she could marry him. Believing her spirit to reside in a nearby fort, the trio ventures there and encounters Stree. Vicky is nearly enchanted, but the mysterious woman repels the spirit. She claims that she lost someone to Stree and has been trying to stop her for years.

The group rescues Jana and takes him home but eventually notices his strange conduct; he erases the protective wall inscriptions, causing more abductions. They consult Shastri, the book's author, who prophesies that a man born under an oak tree to a courtesan will defeat Stree. Rudra suggests that Vicky fits his prophecy, revealing that his mother was a courtesan. He confirms this with his father and decides to embrace his destiny.

The group devises a plan to trap Stree and lures her to Vicky. However, she abducts him again and takes him to her lair, where Vicky understands her desire for love and respect. The woman advises Vicky to cut off Stree's braid, her source of power. He does so, and Stree disappears. The next day, the group is celebrated in the town while Vicky says goodbye to the woman, still unaware of her name. As she leaves on a bus, she is shown attaching Stree's braid to her own and vanishes, hinting at her possible desires to possess Stree's abilities.

A year later, Stree returns to Chanderi but sees a statue erected in her honour with the phrase O Stree Raksha Karna (transl. "O Stree, protect us"), prompting her to leave peacefully.

== Cast ==
- Shraddha Kapoor as The Unknown Girl
- Rajkummar Rao as Vicky Parashar
- Pankaj Tripathi as Rudra
- Aparshakti Khurana as Bittu
- Abhishek Banerjee as Janardan a.k.a. Jana
- Atul Srivastava as Vicky's father
- Flora Saini as Stree
- Vijay Raaz as Shankar Shastri
- Aakash Dabhade as Narendra
- Sunita Rajwar as Jana's mother
- Badriprasad Chavan as Lokesh
- Mustaqueem Khan as Durga
- Manoj Chaube as Panditji
- Viren Basoya as Prakash
- R. N. Shukla as Watchman
- Kusumlata Shastri as Vicky's Neighbour
- Mushtaq Khan as An M.L.A.
- Nora Fatehi as The dancer in the song "Kamariya" (cameo appearance)
- Amar Kaushik as The Homeless Person (cameo appearance)

== Production ==
=== Development ===
In November 2017, it was reported that Dinesh Vijan had finalised Rajkummar Rao as the lead actor for his next production, a comedy horror written by Raj & DK. Raj & DK revealed that the urban legend Nale Ba, which means "come tomorrow" in Kannada, was the core idea behind the film. They found the concept of a ghost turning back upon reading the sign "absurd and funny" and aimed to develop a unique perspective, featuring a gender reversal where the ghost targets men and men are afraid to go out at night.

In December 2017, Shraddha Kapoor announced on Twitter that she would collaborate with Rajkummar Rao and Maddock Films on their upcoming project. In January 2018, it was confirmed that the film would be titled Stree, directed by Amar Kaushik. To prepare for his role, Rao received a sewing machine, and a tailor visited him daily for 20 days to teach him how to sew.

=== Filming ===
Principal photography for Stree began on 13 January 2018 in Chanderi and the first schedule concluded on 30 January 2018. The second shooting schedule took place in Bhopal in March, chosen by producer Dinesh Vijan for its associated mysterious stories. Upon arrival, locals informed the production team about unexplained events in the area and necessary safety precautions. In response, guidelines were created and displayed in all rooms within the fort. Shraddha Kapoor completed half of her filming schedule in just 10 days. The final shooting schedule wrapped up on 1 May 2018. After filming was complete, a promotional song featuring Rajkummar Rao and Shraddha Kapoor was shot in Mumbai in May 2018. Although the promotional song "Aao Kabhi Haveli Pe", featuring Kriti Sanon alongside Rao and Badshah, was filmed, it ultimately remained as background music in the film.

== Music ==
The music for the film has been composed by Sachin–Jigar. The lyrics are written by Vayu except for one song "Aao Kabhi Haveli Pe" which is written by Badshah and Jigar Saraiya. The score is composed by Ketan Sodha. The entire soundtrack album, comprising four tracks, was released on 17 August 2018 by T-Series.

== Release ==
Stree was theatrically released worldwide on 31 August 2018.

== Reception ==
=== Critical response ===
Stree received positive critical reception. On the review aggregator website Rotten Tomatoes, 80% of 15 critics' reviews are positive, with an average rating of 6.3/10.

Anupama Chopra of Film Companion gave the film 3.5 stars out of five, stating that "With laughs and scares, Stree delivers an important message." Anna M. M. Vetticad of Firstpost also rated it 3.5/5, praising Rao's acting and the film's humour. She wrote that "The primary reason why Stree is so effective, though, is that it does not caricature the people of Chanderi—they are as real and foolish, prejudiced, and good as most human beings are, and could well be you or me with less sophistication. Rajeev Masand of News18 gave it 3.5 out of 5, stating, "Stree is especially entertaining, packed with laugh-aloud moments and a cast that's on top of their game. It's one of the most original films this year, and I recommend that you make time for it." Rachit Gupta of The Times of India offered 3.5 out of 5, noting the superlative writing and dialogues, but felt the film was a little too long and had some "ambiguous ideas". Raja Sen of the Hindustan Times took a more moderate tone, commending the actors' energy and collaborative efforts but noting a rushed-feeling plot: "The laughs are inconsistent, and the plotting feels sloppy and rushed. The ideas are fine, but the writing needed work."

=== Box office ===
Stree collected ₹6.82 crore in India on the first day. In its first week, the film grossed ₹60.39 crore in India, surpassing its production budget of ₹23–25 crore. By the end of the second week, the film had grossed ₹95.53 crore. Overall, the film grossed ₹180.76 crore at the box office during its theatrical run.

== Accolades ==
Award	Date of ceremony	Category	Recipient(s)	Result	Ref.
Screen Awards	16 December 2018	Best Film	Dinesh Vijan, Raj & DK	Won	
Screen Awards	16 December 2018	Best Director	Amar Kaushik	Nominated	
Screen Awards	16 December 2018	Best Actor	Rajkummar Rao	Won	
Screen Awards	16 December 2018	Best Supporting Actor	Pankaj Tripathi	Won	
Screen Awards	16 December 2018	Best Dialogue	Sumit Arora	Won	
Screen Awards	16 December 2018	Most Promising Debut Director	Amar Kaushik	Won	
Screen Awards	16 December 2018	Most Promising Newcomer – Male	Abhishek Banerjee	Nominated	
Zee Cine Awards	19 March 2019	Best Film	Dinesh Vijan, Raj & DK	Nominated	
Zee Cine Awards	19 March 2019	Best Film (Critics)	Dinesh Vijan, Raj & DK	Nominated	
Zee Cine Awards	19 March 2019	Best Actor – Male	Rajkummar Rao	Nominated	
Zee Cine Awards	19 March 2019	Best Supporting Actor – Male	Pankaj Tripathi	Nominated	
Zee Cine Awards	19 March 2019	Best Actor in a Comic Role	Abhishek Banerjee	Nominated	
Zee Cine Awards	19 March 2019	Best Actor in a Comic Role	Aparshakti Khurana	Nominated	
Zee Cine Awards	19 March 2019	Best Debut Director	Amar Kaushik	Won	
Zee Cine Awards	19 March 2019	Best Dialogue	Sumit Arora	Won	
Filmfare Awards	23 March 2019	Best Film	Dinesh Vijan, Raj & DK	Nominated	
Filmfare Awards	23 March 2019	Best Director	Amar Kaushik	Nominated	
Filmfare Awards	23 March 2019	Best Actor	Rajkummar Rao	Nominated	
Filmfare Awards	23 March 2019	Best Supporting Actor	Aparshakti Khurana	Nominated	
Filmfare Awards	23 March 2019	Best Supporting Actor	Pankaj Tripathi	Nominated	
Filmfare Awards	23 March 2019	Best Story	Raj & DK	Nominated	
Filmfare Awards	23 March 2019	Best Screenplay	Raj & DK	Nominated	
Filmfare Awards	23 March 2019	Best Dialogue	Sumit Arora	Nominated	
Filmfare Awards	23 March 2019	Best Editing	Hemanti Sarkar	Nominated	
Filmfare Awards	23 March 2019	Best Art Direction	Madhusudan	Nominated	
Filmfare Awards	23 March 2019	Best Debut Director	Amar Kaushik	Won	

== Installments ==
The second installment titled Bhediya, starring Varun Dhawan, Kriti Sanon, Abhishek Banerjee, Deepak Dobriyal and Paalin Kabak was released on 25 November 2022. The third installment titled Munjya, starring Abhay Verma, Sharvari, Mona Singh and Sathyaraj was released on 7 June 2024.. The fourth Installment, which was a sequel of itself titled Stree 2 was released on 15 August 2024. The fifth Installment titled Thamma was released on 21 October 2025. Sixth installment titled Shakti Shalini is expected to release in 2026/27.

== Sequel ==
The sequel and fourth instalment titled Stree 2, starring Rajkummar Rao, Shraddha Kapoor, Pankaj Tripathi, Abhishek Banerjee and Aparshakti Khurana was released on 15 August 2024.
