= Safed (film) =

2023 Indian film

- Official Release poster
- Directed by: Sandeep Singh
- Written by: Sandeep Singh
- Screenplay by: Sandeep Singh
- Produced by: Sandeep Singh
- Starring: Meera Chopra; Abhay Verma; Barkha Bisht
- Cinematography: Anirban Chatterjee
- Edited by: Rajesh G Pandey; Rahul Om Reniwal
- Music by: Rekha Bhardwaj; Shail Hada; Monty Massey; Jahaan Shah; Jaspreet Jazim Sharma; Shashi Suman
- Production companies: Legend Studios; Anand Pandit Motion Pictures
- Distributed by: ZEE5
- Release date: 29 December 2023
- Running time: 90 minutes
- Country: India
- Language: Hindi

Safed (transl. White) is a 2023 Indian Hindi-language drama film written, directed and produced by Sandeep Singh. It stars Meera Chopra, Abhay Verma, Barkha Bisht and Jameel Khan.

It premiered on ZEE5 on 29 December 2023 to negative reviews from critics.

== Plot ==
Kaali, A young woman who has recently lost her husband. Following rigid orthodox customs, she is stripped of her identity, forced to wear white (safed), and sent to live in a "widow house" (vidhwa ashram) where she is expected to live a life of mourning and social invisibility.Chandi is a transgender person (eunuch) who has been disowned by her family. She lives within a trans community but struggles against the harsh realities of her existence, including the pressure from her community leaders, Guru Maa and Radha, to enter the sex trade—a path she desperately wants to avoid.The story begins with both characters at their lowest point, feeling that society has no place for them. In an act of desperation, both attempt to end their lives by drowning in the Ganges. Underwater, their paths cross; Kaali saves Chaandi (initially mistaking her for a man).

Because Kaali believes Chaandi is a man named Chaand, she begins to form a bond with "him." For Chaandi, the attention and respect she receives from Kaali—who treats her as a human being rather than an outcast—is a feeling she has never experienced. This leads to a delicate, unconventional romance. Chaandi hides her true gender identity to preserve this rare connection, finding a temporary escape from the abuse and "cursed" status she faces within her own community.Meanwhile, Chaandi is forced by a drunk man to have sex with him which, Chaandi complies.

On the day of Holi, in a moment of vulnerability and surrendering herself to "Chaand," Kaali discovers Chaandi's physical reality. The revelation shatters Kaali, who feels betrayed. However, the film concludes on a heavy, symbolic note: after confronting the head of the widow home and grappling with their shared status as "the living dead" in the eyes of the world, Kaali eventually accepts Chaandi.

In a tragic conclusion meant to highlight their lack of agency in a conformist world, the two find their ultimate solace together. They return to the river where they first met and, unable to find a place in society, choose to drown together, seeking peace in death that they were denied in life.

== Cast ==
- Meera Chopra as Kaali
- Abhay Verma as Chaandi
- Barkha Bisht as Radha
- Chhaya Kadam as Amma
- Jameel Khan as Guru Maa

== Music ==
No.	Title	Lyrics	Singer(S)	Length
1.	"Bhula Dena"	Soham Majumdar	Subhankar Dey	3:12
2.	"Rona Aaya"	Mehboob	Sonu Nigam	2:42
3.	"Rang Rasiya"	Mahima Bhardwaj	Shilpa Rao	3:21
4.	"Gila Karna"	Mohan Jutley	Jazim Sharma	4:01
Total length:				13:16

== Reception ==
Sana Farzeen of India Today gave two stars out of five and writes in her review ""Safed," Sandeep Singh's directorial debut, has a good intention, but it suffers from mediocre acting." Vinamra Mathur of Firstpost said, "It's one of those rare films where the silence itself cries ham. The conversation doesn't benefit any of the communities the movie so proudly portrays, and the images fall short of enlivening the restrained." Dhaval Roy of The Times of India gave 2 stars out of 5 and writes in his review that although Safed's idea seems sound on paper, it is not well executed. A thoughtful idea becomes more sensational than delicate, and the over-dramatization diminishes its effect. Toshiro Agarwal of Times Now criticizes the film and said, "In his directing debut, Sandeep Singh explores marginalized lives via Kaali's unanticipated romance with Chaandi. The film receives a meager 1.5 stars because of its forced speech and unexpressed emotions, despite its decent intentions." A reviewer from OTT Play writes, "For those who enjoy seeing experimental films, "Safed" is a good choice. However, it is still true that modern moviegoers would rather see a heroine dressed in a contemporary chiffon sari than a "safed" saree (if you know what we mean!). Writing for Rediff, Mayur Sanap gave one star and opined, "Safed is a lame attempt at social commentary, with terribly dull and thoughtless direction".
