= Fauji 2 =

- Genre: Action
- Written by: Amarnath Jha; Vishal Chaturvedi; Prerna Rawat; Anil Choudhary; Chaitanya Tulsyan
- Directed by: Abhinav Pareek; Nishant C Shekhar
- Starring: Vicky Jain; Gauahar Khan
- Music by: Shreyas Puranik
- Country of origin: India
- Original language: Hindi

Production
- Producers: Sandeep Singh; Vicky Jain; Zafar Mehdi
- Camera setup: Multi-camera
- Running time: 22-24 minutes
- Production company: Legend Studios

Original release
- Network: DD National
- Release: 18 November 2024

Related
- Fauji

Fauji 2 (translation: "Soldier 2") is an Indian Hindi-language television series produced by Sandeep Singh under Legend Studios. A sequel to the 1989 series Fauji, it stars Vicky Jain and Gauahar Khan. The series premiered on DD National on 18 November 2024, and digitally streams on Waves.

== Cast ==
- Vicky Jain as Colonel Sanjay Singh
- Gauahar Khan as Lieutenant Colonel Simarjeet Kaur
- Aashish Bhardwaj as Daksh Desai
- Utkarsh Kohli as Rangrez Phogat
- Rudra Soni as Harun Malik
- Ayaan Manchanda as Aakash Chhetri
- Niel Satpuda as Vijay Sachan
- Suvansh Dhar as Abhimanyu Rai
- Ashish Wadde as Abhimanyu Father
- Priyanshu Rajguru as Subbu Balakrishnan
- Aman Singh Deep as Vikram Singh Bagga
- Udit Kapur as Arjun Negi
- Maansi as Kavya Rajadhyaksha
- Sushmita Bhandari as Kinjal Joshi

== Production ==
The series was announced on DD National. Principal photography of the series began in October 2024. The trailer of the series was released on 2 November 2024.

== Music ==
Fauji 2

Soundtrack album by Shreyas Puranik
- Released: 2025
- Genre: Soundtrack
- Length: 6:27
- Language: Hindi
- Label: T-Series

The music for Fauji 2 is composed by Shreyas Puranik.

Tracklisting
No.	Title	Music	Singer(s)	Length
1.	"Fauji 2 (Title Track)"	Shreyas Puranik	Sonu Nigam	3:28
2.	"Jahaan"	Shashi Suman	Kunal Ganjawala	2:59
Total length:				06:27
