= Aparshakti Khurana =

Indian actor and singer (born 1987)

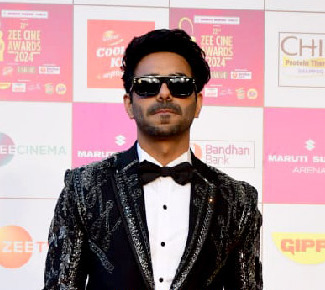
- Khurana at the 2024 Zee Cine Awards
- Born: 18 November 1987 (age 39); Chandigarh, India
- Occupation: Actor
- Years active: 2013–present
- Spouse: Akriti Ahuja Khurana (m. 2014)
- Children: 1
- Relatives: Ayushmann Khurrana (brother)

Aparshakti Khurana (born 18 November 1987) is an Indian actor known for his supporting roles in the films Dangal (2016), Stree (2018), Pati Patni Aur Woh (2019), and Stree 2 (2024), as well as for his starring role in the drama series Jubilee (2023). He is the younger brother of actor Ayushmann Khurrana.

== Early life and education ==
Khurrana was born on 18 November 1987 in Chandigarh. His father P. Khurrana was an astrologer and an author on the subject of black magic, whereas his mother Poonam is a house wife of half-Burmese descent.

He completed his schooling and graduation in law from Chandigarh. He was also into sports at school and captained the Haryana U-19 cricket team.

== Career ==
=== Debut and work in supporting parts (2016-2022) ===
Khurana made his acting debut in 2016 with the ensemble crime comedy Saat Uchakkey and the sports biopic Dangal, playing the adult version of Mahavir Singh Phogat's nephew Omkar in the latter. Shubhra Gupta observed, "Aparshakti (as well as his younger version Ritvik Sahore) is the funny-bone-cum-sutradhar. He is spot on in deportment and accent". A major commercial success, it ranks as the highest grossing Indian film. Following this, he played supporting parts in the films Badrinath Ki Dulhania (2017) and Happy Phirr Bhag Jayegi (2018). The former emerged as his second consecutive box-office success.

Khurana had his career breakthrough with the 2018 horror-comedy drama Stree, playing Bittu, one of three friends in the small town of Chanderi who unravel the mystery of the titular ghost. Reviewing the film, Saibal Chatterjee stated, "Aparshakti, full of beans, steals many a scene." The film emerged as a major commercial success against its small budget. This success was followed by supporting parts in several films including Rajma Chawal (2018), Luka Chuppi (2019), Jabariya Jodi (2019), Pati Patni Aur Woh (2019) and Street Dancer (2020). Among these, Luka Chuppi and Pati Patni Aur Woh became box office successes. He also had a special appearance in Bala (2019), which starred his brother Ayushmann as the titular lead.

Khurana had his first lead role in the 2019 film Kanpuriye opposite Harshita Gaur, where he played a leather factory worker. He next followed this with the role of an orphaned wedding band leader opposite Pranutan Bahl in the 2021 film Helmet, produced by actor Dino Morea. The film, released on ZEE5, is based on the taboo associated with use of condoms in India. Rahul Desai of Film Companion was appreciative of his performance. This was followed by a supporting role in Hum Do Hamare Do the same year.

=== Critical acclaim and career progression (2023-present) ===
Khurana played a terrorist in the 2022 film Dhokha: Round D Corner Grace Cyril of India Today stated, "Aparshakti is impactful as Gul and nails his role". The following year,he expanded into streaming with Jubilee, playing a struggling actor. Vikramaditya Motwane was initially unsure on his casting for the role of Binod, but was later "blown away" by his audition. Khurana added that Binod's character was also personal to him owing to journey as a costume stylist and then as a television host before acting in Hindi cinema. Titas Chowdhury of News18 noted, "Aparshakti as Binod delivers a class act and proves that given a tough role with multiple emotional graphs, he can ace them with a striking ease."

Khurana started 2024 with Stree 2, reprising his role as Bittu from the original, opposite Anya Singh. Tushar Joshi of India Today noted, "Aparshakti’s character is well-defined and contributes significantly to the overall plot". The film emerged as the highest-grossing Hindi film of the year and one of the highest-grossing Indian film. He then played a sign language expert in Berlin. Rishabh Suri noted, "Aparshakti, shedding all baggage of being the funny guy in previous films, gets a meaty role to dig his teeth into. He manages to convince us as the morally upright, simple Pushkin, who is left broken at how the system works."

In his first release of 2026, Khurana played a lawyer fighting a couple divorce case in Jab Khuli Kitaab. Dhaval Roy from The Times of India was appreciative of his "strong performance". He followed this by playing an IT professional in Prem Keetanu. The film received mixed to negative reviews and failed at the box office.

== Personal life ==
He married Aakriti Ahuja, a businesswoman and an ISB graduate (whom he met at a dance class in Chandigarh) on 7 September 2014. In June 2021, the couple announced that they were expecting their first child. The couple became parents to a baby girl on 27 August 2021, Arzoie A Khurana.

== Filmography ==
=== Films ===
Year	Title	Role	Notes	Ref.
2016	Dangal	Omkar Singh Phogat		
2016	Saat Uchakkey	Khappe		
2017	Badrinath Ki Dulhania	Bhushan Mishra		
2018	Happy Phirr Bhag Jayegi	Aman Singh Wadhwa		
2018	Stree	Bittu		
2018	Rajma Chawal	Baljeet		
2019	Luka Chuppi	Abbas Sheikh		
2019	Jabariya Jodi	Santosh Pathak		
2019	Kanpuriye	Jaitaan Mishra		
2019	Bala	Arjun Singh		
2019	Pati Patni Aur Woh	Fahim Rizvi		
2020	Street Dancer	Amrinder		
2021	Helmet	Lucky		
2021	Hum Do Hamare Do	Sandeep "Shunty" Sachdeva		
2022	Dhokha: Round D Corner	Haq Riyaz Gul		
2022	Bhediya	Bittu	Cameo appearance	
2024	Stree 2	Bittu		
2024	Berlin	Pushkin Verma		
2024	CTRL	Allen	Voice appearance	
2026	Jab Khuli Kitaab	Advocate RK Negi		
2026	Prem Keetanu	Ranjit		
2026	Gunmaaster G9 †	Desu	Completed	
TBA	ROOT - Running Out Of Time †	TBA	Tamil film; Post-production	
TBA	Badtameez Gill †	TBA	Completed	
2027	Side Heroes †	TBA	Filming	

=== Television ===
Year	Title	Role	Notes	Ref.
2014	Box Cricket League	Commentator		
2014	Popcorn	Dhijendra	Short film	
2017	You Have Been Warned	Host	Talk show	
2017	Super Night with Tubelight	Host		
2017	Om Shanti Om	Host		
2018	Bigg Buzz	Host		
2018	Ace of Space 1	Himself	Guest	
2018	Kanpur Wale Khuranas	Host/Pramod's brother-in-law		
2019	Khatra Khatra Khatra	Himself	Guest	
2022	Business Baazi			
2023	Jubilee	Binod Das		

=== Music videos ===
Year	Song	Album	Singer	Ref.
2019	Tere Do Naina	Naina	Ankit Tiwari	
2019	Ruka Ruka	Non-album single	Shalmali Kholgade	
2021	Aaya Jado Da	Non-album single	Asees Kaur	
2022	Yaaron Sab Dua Karo	Non-album single	Stebin Ben, Meet Bros, Danish Sabri	
2022	Kaale Kaale Chashme	Non-album single	Stebin Ben	
2022	Hum Dono	Non-album single	Arko	

== Discography ==
Year	Song	Co-singer	Music composer	Lyrics	Ref.
2016	Ik Vaari	Ayushmann Khurrana	Himself, Ayushmann Khurrana		
2019	Kudiye Ni	Neeti Mohan	Himself		
2020	Teri Yaar	Millind Gaba, King Kaazi	Music MG	Millind Gaba, King Kaazi, Viruss, Stylish Singh	
2022	Balle Ni Balle	—N/a	Siddharth Amit Bhavsar	Gurpreet Saini	
2022	Choti Choti Gal	—N/a	Arjuna Harjai	Kumaar	
2022	Neendraan Ni Aandiyaan	—N/a	Sushant-Shankar	Yash Eshwari	
2024	Zaroor	—N/a	Savi Kahlon	Savi Kahlon	
2026	Nikki Nikki Gal	Tulsi Kumar	Sakshi Ratti		

== Awards and nominations ==
Year	Award	Category	Film	Result	Ref.
2017	Star Screen Awards	Most Promising Newcomer (Male)	Dangal	Won	
2017	Star Screen Awards	Best Actor in a Comic Role	Dangal	Nominated	
2017	Filmfare Awards	Best Male Debut	Dangal	Nominated	
2019	Filmfare Awards	Best Supporting Actor	Stree	Nominated	
2023	Filmfare OTT Awards	Best Actor in a Drama Series	Jubilee	Nominated	
2023	Bollywood Hungama OTT India Fest	Best Breakthrough Performer – Male	Jubilee	Won	
