= Bhediya =

2022 Indian film by Amar Kaushik

- Theatrical release poster
- Directed by: Amar Kaushik
- Written by: Niren Bhatt
- Produced by: Dinesh Vijan; Jyoti Deshpande
- Starring: Varun Dhawan; Kriti Sanon; Abhishek Banerjee; Deepak Dobriyal; Paalin Kabak
- Cinematography: Jishnu Bhattacharjee
- Edited by: Sanyukta Kaza
- Music by: Sachin–Jigar
- Production companies: Maddock Films; Jio Studios
- Distributed by: Pen Marudhar Entertainment (Hindi); Studio Green (Tamil); Geetha Arts Distributors (Telugu)
- Release date: 25 November 2022
- Running time: 156 minutes
- Country: India
- Language: Hindi
- Budget: est. ₹60 crore
- Box office: est. ₹89.97 crore

Bhediya (pronounced [ˈbʱeːɽɪjɑː]; transl. Wolf) is a 2022 Indian Hindi-language comedy horror film directed by Amar Kaushik. Produced by Dinesh Vijan from a story and screenplay by Niren Bhatt, it stars Varun Dhawan alongside Kriti Sanon, Abhishek Banerjee, Deepak Dobriyal and Paalin Kabak. The plot of the film is inspired by Arunachal Pradesh's folklore about a Yapum, a shape-shifting werewolf, who wants to protect the jungle, even if they have to kill somebody. This marks the second collaboration between Dhawan and Sanon since Dilwale (2015). It is the second installment in the Maddock Horror Comedy Universe.

Bhediya was theatrically released on 25 November 2022, garnering positive reviews. The film grossed ₹90 crore against a production budget of approximately ₹60 crore at the box office. It received 13 nominations at the 68th Filmfare Awards, including Best Film (Critics), Best Actor (Critics) and Best Special Effects. A sequel is in development.

== Plot ==
Road contractor Bhaskar, accompanied by his cousin Jana, visits downtown Ziro, Arunachal Pradesh, on a road construction assignment. There, they are welcomed by local residents Jomin, a friend of Bhaskar, and Panda, who show them around. One night, a wolf attacks Bhaskar on his rear end, and he is immediately rushed to Anika, a local veterinarian. Despite her inexperience, she treats him. The next day, Bhaskar finds himself miraculously cured and notices heightened senses of smell and hearing; he also realises that he can now communicate with animals. Meanwhile, local tribes and residents strongly oppose his project, as it requires deforestation.

Following the deaths of two officials involved in the project due to alleged animal attacks, Bhaskar reveals to his friends that he has become a shape-shifting werewolf ever since being bitten by the wolf, and that he has been committing the murders while having no control over his actions. They decide to chain Bhaskar up at a remote location each night to prevent further attacks. Nevertheless, a police officer discovers the truth and intimidates Bhaskar, but is subsequently attacked and killed by the wolf that bit him. Horrified, Bhaskar and his friends consult a Shaman, who asserts that Bhaskar can only be cured if he is bitten by the same werewolf on a new moon night at the same place. He then goes there with Jana and Jomin and realises that Anika is the werewolf.

Anika reveals that she was bitten by a werewolf over a century ago and has since served as the guardian of the forest. She tells them that she initially intended to kill Bhaskar for his involvement in the project, but chose to spare him upon realising that he possesses kindness and humanity. Anika is subsequently shot and captured by the local police, but Bhaskar transforms into a wolf and comes to her rescue. They subdue the police officers and go to a cliff, where Anika succumbs to her wounds and dies, leaving Bhaskar, who has fallen in love with her, devastated. He announces that the road will be rerouted along the forest's border, thereby avoiding deforestation.

In the post-credits scene, as Jana chains Bhaskar up to contain his transformations, his friends Vicky and Bittu pay him a visit and plead with him to return home, seeking his help with a new issue and asking for his assistance in finding Stree. Bhaskar transforms into a werewolf and suddenly appears in front of them, leaving them terrified.

== Cast ==
- Varun Dhawan as Bhaskar, a road contractor
- Kriti Sanon as Dr Anika Mittal, Bhaskar's love interest
- Deepak Dobriyal as Panda
- Abhishek Banerjee as Janardan "Jana"/ JD, Bhaskar's cousin; Banerjee reprises his role from Stree.
- Paalin Kabak as Jomin
- Manoj Bakshi as Bhaskar's father
- Baharul Islam as Engineer Neri
- Dosam Beyong as Prakash Paja
- Madang Pai as Ojha
- Tai Tugung as Police Inspector Tempol
- Ligang Sallu as Kaso, Forest Range Officer
- Nending Uttung as PSI
- Bengia Morto as a youngster at Lapong
- Hage Apa as the Doctor
- Tadu Omu as the Hunter
- Surbhi Verma as News Reporter

=== Special appearances ===
- Saurabh Shukla as Babanjeet Bagga
- Sharad Kelkar as Anika's father
- Amar Kaushik as the stud at the music festival
- Rajkummar Rao as Vicky, Jana's friend, reprises his role from Stree
- Aparshakti Khurana as Bittu, Jana's friend, reprises his role from Stree
- Shraddha Kapoor in the song "Thumkeshwari", reprising her role from Stree

== Production ==
The producer of the film, Dinesh Vijan, confirmed that Bhediya is part of his horror comedy universe consisting of films like Stree and Munjya. The shooting for Bhediya nikka took place in the regions of Arunachal Pradesh's Ziro (Lower Subansiri), Sagalee (Papum Pare) and parts of Pakke-Kessang district- over a span of two months, from March to April 2021. Over 70 percent of the artists in Bhediya are from Arunachal Pradesh, including a lead character, named Jomin. Besides that, Arunachal rapper K4 Kheko had sung and written the lyrics for the theme song of the film. While the film has several Arunachal dialogues, they are not subtitled, with the character of Panda acting as translator to the non-Arunachal characters. Sanon's bob cut hairstyle was inspired by her childhood looks.

During the shooting schedule, Varun Dhawan and his wife, designer Natasha Dalal donated ₹1 lakh (US$1,000) to the victims of a massive fire in Arunachal Pradesh's Tirap and Longding districts in April 2021. Chief Minister of Arunachal Pradesh, Pema Khandu also visited the set in Ziro. The shooting schedule in Arunachal Pradesh was completed on 19 April 2021. Filming wrapped on 10 July 2021.

== Themes ==
Bhediya explores wildlife conservation and speaks against deforestation. It also speaks against the racial discrimination that Northeast Indians face from other Indians, including being treated as non-Indians and accused of having stereotypes of Chinese, Japanese and Korean people, including kung fu expertise.

== Music ==
Bhediya

Soundtrack album by Sachin–Jigar
- Released: 22 November 2022
- Recorded: 2021–2022
- Genre: Feature film soundtrack
- Length: 13:09
- Language: Hindi
- Label: Zee Music Company
- Producer: Sachin–Jigar

Sachin–Jigar chronology
Dasvi (2022)	Bhediya (2022)	Govinda Naam Mera (2022)
External audio
- Audio Jukebox on YouTube

The music of the film is composed by Sachin–Jigar while the lyrics are written by Amitabh Bhattacharya. The first single titled "Thumkeshwari" was released on 28 October 2022. The second single audio titled "Apna Bana Le was released on 5 November 2022 while its video was released on 7 November 2022.

All lyrics are written by Amitabh Bhattacharya.

Bhediya (Hindi)
No.	Title	Singer(s)	Length
1.	"Thumkeshwari"	Rashmeet Kaur, Ash King, Divya Kumar, Sachin-Jigar	2:43
2.	"Apna Bana Le"	Arijit Singh, Sachin-Jigar	4:21
3.	"Jungle Mein Kaand"	Vishal Dadlani, Sukhwinder Singh, Siddharth Basrur, Sachin-Jigar	2:46
4.	"Baaki Sab Theek"	Sachin–Jigar, Amitabh Bhattacharya	3:19
Total length:			13:09

All lyrics are written by Yanamandra Ramakrishna.

Thodelu (Telugu)
No.	Title	Singer(s)	Length
1.	"Thumkeshwari" (Telugu)	Karthik, Anusha Mani	2:43
2.	"Chilipi Varaale Ivvu"	Karthik	4:23
3.	"Adavullo Chichu Regeraa"	Benny Dayal	2:46
4.	"Anthaa Oke Naa"	Santhosh Hariharan, Velu, KJ Iyenar	3:27
Total length:			13:19

All lyrics are written by S. Sunandhan.

Onai (Tamil)
No.	Title	Singer(s)	Length
1.	"Thumkeshwari" (Tamil)	Karthik, Anusha Mani	2:43
2.	"Ennakai Pirathavale Neeya"	Karthik	4:23
3.	"Kaduna Thrillu Thanada"	Benny Dayal	2:46
4.	"Ellam Ok Va"	Santhosh Hariharan, Velu, KJ Iyenar	3:27
Total length:			13:19

== Release ==
=== Theatrical ===
The film was released theatrically on 25 November 2022 along with the dubbed versions in Telugu (titled Thodelu) and Tamil (titled Onai).

=== Home media ===
Six months after its theatrical release, the film began streaming on JioCinema from 26 May 2023 in Hindi and the dubbed versions of Bengali, Marathi, Tamil, Telugu, Kannada, and Malayalam languages.

== Reception ==
=== Box office ===
Bhediya grossed ₹7.48 crore on its opening day and approximately ₹42.05 crore in its first week. The film was produced on a budget of ₹60 crore and, during its theatrical run, grossed ₹89.97 crore at the worldwide box office.

=== Critical response ===
Bhediya received positive reviews from critics and audiences. On the review aggregator website Rotten Tomatoes, 62% of 13 critics' reviews are positive, with an average rating of 6.3/10.

Amandeep Naang of ABP News rated the film 4 out of 5 stars and wrote, "Bhediya is a mad ride of a horror-comedy which feels different in the current climate of remakes, thrillers and period dramas." Siby Jeyya of India Herald rated the film 4 out of 5 stars and wrote, "The impact of the film's visuals is by far its most noteworthy aspect. The VFX are incredible, and cinematographer Jishnu Bhattacharjee has masterfully captured the dark and fascinating realm of werewolves with the backdrop of the full moon in the midnight sky, ziro jungles, and mountains." Bollywood Hungama rated the film 3.5 out of 5 stars and wrote, "Bhediya works due to its novel idea, memorable performances, captivating climax, and VFX." Dhaval Roy of The Times of India rated the film 3.5 stars out of 5 and wrote, " Director Amar Kaushik handles both genres skillfully in his latest outing and strikes a fine balance to deliver a movie that’s spine chilling in some instances, rib-tickling in almost all, and leaves you with something to think about." Tushar Joshi of India Today rated the film 3.5 out of 5 stars and wrote "Performances feel genuine and Kaushik’s USP of infusing humour and wit at the right moments helps in keeping the narrative engaging and entertaining."

Saibal Chatterjee of NDTV rated the film 3.5 out of 5 stars and wrote, "Bhediya is both enjoyable and thought-provoking, is helped along by lively performances. Varun Dhawan gives the unconventional role his best shot. Abhishek Banerjee and Paalin Kabak are terrific as much with their comic timing as with their dramatic flourishes." Devesh Sharma of Filmfare rated the film 3.5 out of 5 stars and wrote, "The film’s creature effects and computer generated imagery is excellent. Cinematography and the background score are good as well." Shubhra Gupta of The Indian Express rated the film 3 out of 5 stars and wrote "Varun Dhawan does a good job of aligning with the tone of the film-- the horror is pretty much ‘naam-ke-vaaste’, comedy is what it is interested in and does it well." Rohit Bhatnagar of The Free Press Journal rated the film 3 out of 5 stars and wrote, "Bhediya is a good one-time popcorn entertainment and a decent distraction from the monotony." Sonil Dedhia of News 18 rated the film 3 out of 5 stars and wrote, "Bhediya has a message that resonates with current times. The film has its heart in the right place but it falters in its execution and writing." Sukanya Verma of Rediff rated the film 3 out of 5 stars and wrote "Varun Dhawan ups his entertainer game exponentially in Bhediya."

In a less positive review, Anna M. M. Vetticad of Firstpost rated it 2.5 out of 5 stars and wrote, “Bhediya is not the first film in this world to sideline characters from social groups sidelined in reality, even while purportedly being about those communities... All the noble intentions in the world and even Abhishek Banerjee’s comedic genius cannot compensate for such mindlessness.” Himesh Mankad of Pinkvilla rated the film 3 out of 5 stars and wrote "Bhediya rides primarily on the strength of gags, visual effects, and performances, but warranted a bigger conflict with regard to a hero and villain in the second half." Rahul Desai from Film Companion wrote, "Bhediya is silly, stylish – and surprisingly poignant."
