= Amar Kaushik =

Indian filmmaker (born 1983)

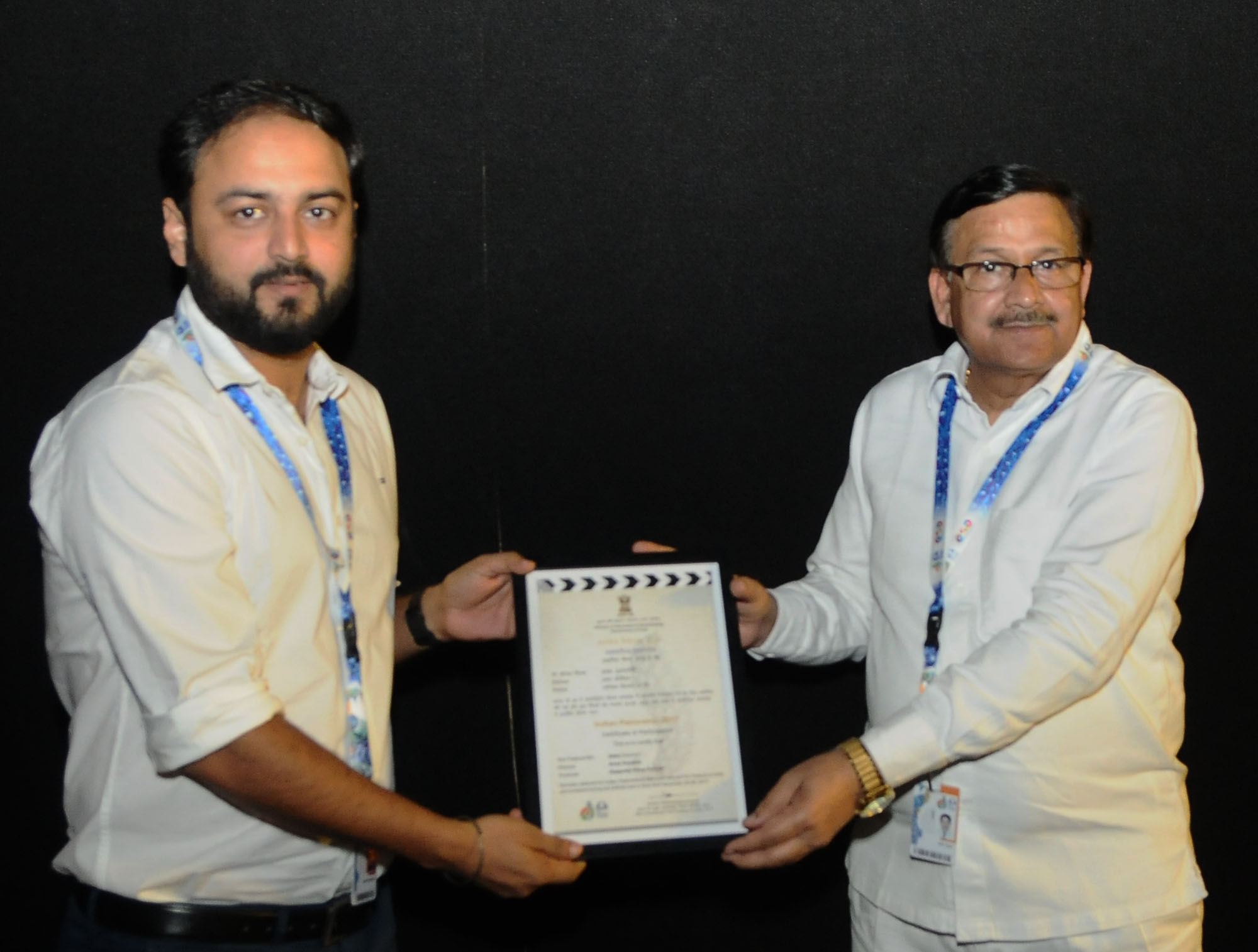
- Amar Kaushik, IFFI (2017)
- Born: 4 August 1983 (age 43); Kanpur, Uttar Pradesh, India
- Occupations: Film director; film producer; screenwriter

Amar Kaushik is an Indian filmmaker. He is best known for directing the Maddock Horror Comedy Universe films Stree (2018), Bhediya (2022), and Stree 2 (2024), as well as the satire Bala (2019).

== Early life ==
He was born in Kanpur city in the state of Uttar Pradesh in a Gaur Brahmin family. Amar Kaushik grew up in Medo, Arunachal Pradesh where his father was a forest ranger who worked for the Indian Forest Service and his mother Shashi was a school teacher. When he was 10 years old, the family moved to Kanpur, Uttar Pradesh. He later studied mass communications in Delhi and moved to Mumbai in 2006.

== Career ==
Kaushik began his film career in 2008, working as Raj Kumar Gupta's assistant director on Aamir. He teamed up with Gupta again to serve as associate director for No One Killed Jessica and Ghanchakkar. In addition to crew duties, Kaushik had small acting roles in each of the three films. After working as an associate director on the Onir films Sorry Bhai!, I Am and Shab, Kaushik ventured into solo directing with his short film Aaaba. The script was written by Kaushik and based on a story by his mother. It was funded with loans from his friends, including Raj Kumar Gupta. Shot entirely in Ziro, Arunachal Pradesh, "Aaba" was screened at the Toronto International Film Festival and won the Special Jury Prize for Best Short Film at the 2017 Berlin International Film Festival.

Kaushik began shooting his debut feature film Stree in January 2018. Starring Rajkummar Rao and Shraddha Kapoor, the horror film was released on 31 August 2018. Stree became a surprise hit, earning ₹175 crore and spawned a series of films constituting the Maddock Horror Comedy Universe. His next directorial venture was Bala (2019), a comedy film starring Ayushmann Khurrana, Bhumi Pednekar and Yami Gautam, which explored premature balding and social prejudice. Kaushik was also slated to direct Mimi, a film based on surrogacy, but was eventually replaced by Laxman Utekar. In 2022, Kaushik directed Bhediya, a horror comedy starring Varun Dhawan and Kriti Sanon. The sequel to Stree, titled Stree 2, was released theatrically on 15 August 2024. The film received positive reviews and became a major box-office success. Kaushik's upcoming projects include Mahavtar, a mythological drama starring Vicky Kaushal as Parashurama, scheduled to begin filming in January 2027, and Stree 3, which is planned for release in 2028.

== Personal life ==
In November 2009, Kaushik was reportedly assaulted by passengers on a Mumbai local train after being mistaken for filmmaker Anurag Kashyap, whom he resembled. Kaushik had been discussing Kashyap's film Dev.D with friends when passengers confronted him over remarks attributed to Kashyap about Raj Thackeray, the leader of the Maharashtra Navnirman Sena.

== Filmography ==
=== Feature films ===
Year	Title	Director	Writer	Producer	Actor
2018	Stree	Yes	No	No	Yes
2019	Bala	Yes	No	No	Yes
2022	Bhediya	Yes	No	No	Yes
2023	Chor Nikal Ke Bhaga	No	Yes	Yes	No
2024	Munjya	No	No	Yes	No
2024	Stree 2	Yes	No	No	Yes
2025	Sky Force	No	No	Yes	No
2025	Thamma	No	No	Yes	Yes
2027	Mahavatar	Yes	No	No	Yes

==== Other credits ====
Year	Title	Role
2008	Aamir	Assistant director
2008	Sorry Bhai!	Assistant director
2010	I Am	Assistant director
2011	No One Killed Jessica	Associate director
2013	Go Goa Gone	Assistant director
2013	Fukrey	Second unit director
2013	Ghanchakkar	Associate director
2014	Mumbai Delhi Mumbai	Post Production supervisor
2017	Shab	Associate director
2017	Beyond the Clouds	Assistant director
2019	Line of Descent	Assistant director

=== Television ===
As director only
Year	Title	Notes
2018	Table No. 5	Zee5 series; 6 episodes
