= Naale Ba =

Folk legend from Karnataka, India

Creature information
- Other name: ನಾಳೆ ಬಾ
- Grouping: Indian folk mythology

Origin
- Country: India
- Region: Karnataka
- Details: English: "Come tomorrow"

Naale Baa (Kannada: ನಾಳೆ ಬಾ, romanized: Nāḷe Bā [n̪aːɭe baː]; lit. 'Come Tomorrow') is a popular folk legend which features prominently in areas across Karnataka, India. "Naale Baa" has been found written on the doors and walls of the towns and villages for certain years. People write this on walls to prevent the entry of a malevolent spirit into their homes. It is believed that a malevolent spirit or witch roams around at night to take children away. In some variations, people believed that a demon roams around, knocks on doors and calls out names of people imitating the voice of their kin. If the person replies, they are said to die vomiting blood or by heart failure. There are also variations of the story where the spirit is believed to be a female ghost in search of her husband. She is known to take away the man of the house, often target those between 20 to 50 years of age, who is often the sole earning member of the family, thereby bringing bad luck to the entire household.

Naale Baa went viral during the 1990s in Karnataka specially in rural Bangalore, gaining widespread popularity from the areas of Malleswaram and Rajajinagar which were considered sub-urban Bangalore at that time. The residents came up with the smart idea of writing "Naale Baa" outside the doors and the walls of their houses. It was believed that when the ghost read this sign, it goes back to come again the next day, only for the cycle to keep repeating.

Practically, some claim it was a mass hysteria faced by young men living in those areas while some others claim that it was the behaviour of a sexually narcissistic women who might have targeted young men of that area. Every year, April 1 is also celebrated as Naale Baa day.

== Origin ==
There was a renewed interest in the legend after reports of similar happenings occurring in a village in Thailand wherein healthy young men began to disappear right under their beds.

== Similar beliefs in other Indian region ==
In West Bengal, Bihar and Jharkhand, there is a similar belief about a malevolent spirit called Nishi Dak.

== Popular culture ==
The 2018 Hindi film Stree, starring Shraddha Kapoor and Rajkumar Rao, is based on the Naale Baa tale from Karnataka. Horror and thriller writer K. Hari Kumar has penned a story inspired from Naale Baa incident in his 2019 book India's Most Haunted - Tales of Terrifying Places published by HarperCollins India. This concept can also be found in the core thematic plot of the 1990 Kannada movie Nigooda Rahasya.
