= Abhay Verma =

Indian actor (born 1998)

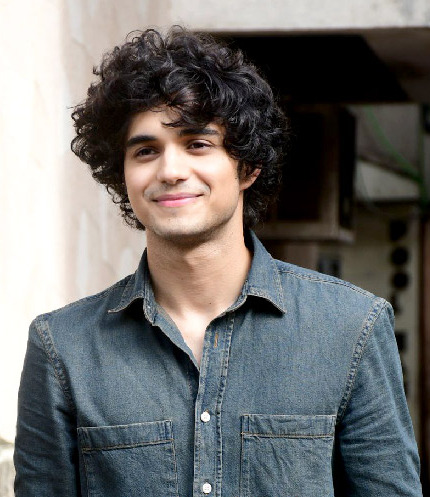
- Verma in 2024
- Born: 27 July 1998 (age 28); Panipat, Haryana, India
- Occupation: Actor
- Years active: 2019–present

Abhay Verma (born 27 July 1998) is an Indian actor who works in Hindi cinema. He first gained recognition for his supporting role on the second season of the thriller series The Family Man (2021), and had his first lead role in the independent film Safed (2023). Verma had his breakthrough with a starring role in the comedy horror film Munjya (2024), a commercial success. In 2026, Verma was placed by Forbes Asia in their 30 Under 30 list.

== Early life ==
Verma is from Panipat, Haryana. He completed his schooling from St. Mary's Convent School, pursued Science but faced failure three times. He then enrolled in BBA but felt it was a waste of time. He came to Mumbai with his parents to pursue a career in acting. His brother, Abhishek Verma (actor), is also an actor.

== Career ==
Verma began his acting career with Marzi and subsequently featured in Little Things. Alongside these projects, he has been involved in television commercials. Verma revealed that during his time as a junior artist on the set of Super 30, where he earned ₹800 rupees per day, he learned extensively from observing others. Inspired by the experience of working alongside 200 people daily, he resolved that his future lay in pursuing greater achievements in cinema rather than continuing in his current role for an extended period.

It was his role opposite Manoj Bajpayee in The Family Man 2 that gained him recognition. He played Kalyan, Dhruti's (played by Ashlesha Thakur) friend involved with terrorists. In 2023, he made his film debut appearing in Safed in the role of a transgender. Sana Farzeen of India Today wrote, "Given his age and lack of experience, Abhay Verma tries to give an honest performance", adding that he "falter[s] when it comes to acing the body language, and also overacts in a few emotional moments".

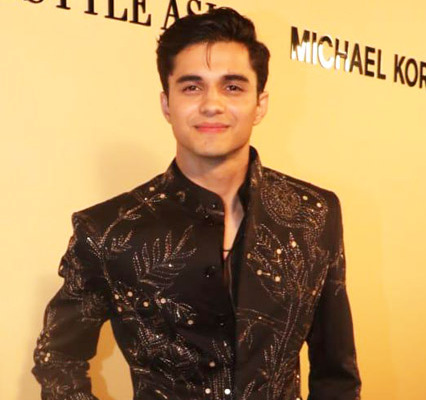
Verma in 2024

In 2024, he featured in the biographical drama Ae Watan Mere Watan, starring Sara Ali Khan as Usha Mehta. Zinia Bandyopadhyay of India Today noted that his performance stood out in a poorly written film. In the same year, he had his breakout role as the lead character of a young man terrorised by a monster in the comedy horror film Munjya. The fourth installment in the Maddock Horror Comedy Universe, the film was inspired by Indian folklore and mythology, focusing on the legend of munjya. Shubhra Gupta of The Indian Express took note of how well he played his "earnest-and-bewildered" character. It emerged as the eighth highest grossing Hindi film of 2024.

Verma filmed a role portraying a young version of India's Prime Minister Narendra Modi in the film Mann Bairagi, which was filmed in the late 2010s and has not-yet been released. He will next feature among an ensemble led by Shah Rukh Khan in Siddharth Anand's action thriller film King. He will also star opposite Rasha Thadani in the romantic action film Laikey Laikaa and with Shanaya Kapoor in Shujaat Saudagar’s as-yet untitled romantic film.

== Filmography ==
=== Film ===
Key
†	Denotes films that have not yet been released

Year	Film	Role	Notes	Ref.
2019	Super 30	—N/a	Junior artist	
2023	Safed	Chaandi	Released on ZEE5	
2024	Ae Watan Mere Watan	Kaushik	Released on Amazon Prime Video	
2024	Munjya	Bittu		
2026	Jacob Cardoso †	TBA	Completed	
2026	Laikey Laikaa †	TBA	Filming	
2026	King †	TBA	Filming	

=== Television ===
Year	Title	Role	Notes	Ref.
2019	Little Things	Unnamed	Season 3, episode 7	
2020	Marzi	Ayaan		
2020	Gormint	Babloo Kumar		
2021	The Family Man	Kalyan/Salman	Season 2	
2026	Operation Safed Sagar	Rajpal "Dhali" Singh Dhaliwal	Main Role	

== Awards and nominations ==
Year	Award	Category	Work	Result	Notes	Ref.
2025	Zee Cine Awards	Zee Cine Award for Best Male Debut	Munjya	Won	Shared with Lakshya for Kill	
