= King Kaazi =

American singer-songwriter

- Born: Ludhiana
- Genres: Zee music
- Occupation: Singer
- Years active: 2014
- Label: Zee music

King Kaazi is an American singer, composer, and songwriter. He was born in India. He is best known for his work in the Punjabi and Urban Desi music scenes.
