= Dinesh Vijan =

Indian film producer (born 1981)

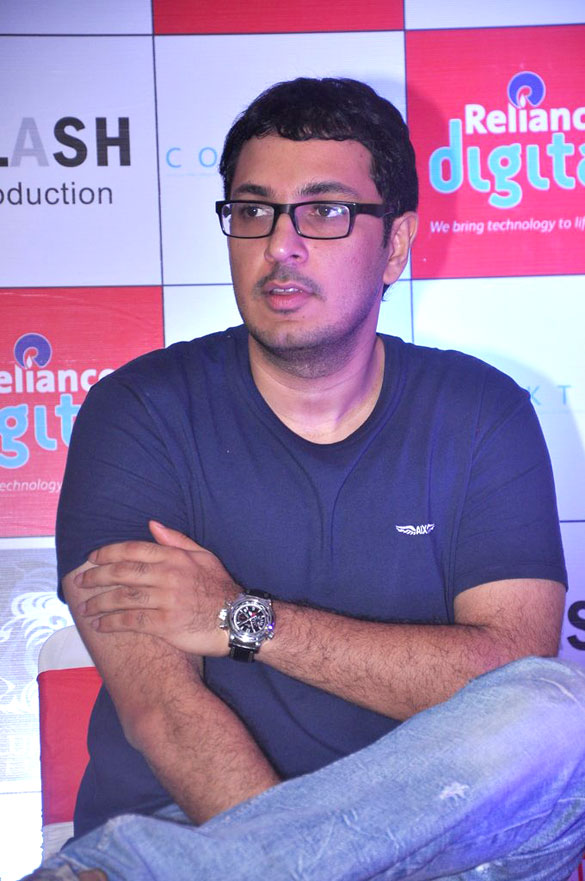
- Vijan in 2012
- Born: 26 July 1981 (age 45); Mumbai, Maharashtra, India
- Occupation: Film producer
- Years active: 2005–present
- Organization: Maddock Films
- Spouse: Pramita Tanwar (m. 2018)

Dinesh Vijan is an Indian film producer and founder of entertainment company Maddock Films. He has produced over 35 films under this banner.

== Early life and career ==
Vijan gave up his banking job in 2004 to pursue a career in films. In 2018, he married Pramita Tanwar.

From 2007 to 2014, he co-owned the production house, Illuminati Films, alongside actor Saif Ali Khan. However, they eventually parted ways following creative differences after the box-office failures of Agent Vinod (2012) and Happy Ending (2014).

He has produced more than 30 films. Some of his notable productions include, Love Aaj Kal (2009), Cocktail (2012), Badlapur (2015), Hindi Medium (2017), Stree (2018), Luka Chuppi (2019), Bala (2019), Angrezi Medium (2020), Mimi (2021), Bhediya (2022), Zara Hatke Zara Bachke (2023), Teri Baaton Mein Aisa Uljha Jiya (2024), Munjya (2024), Stree 2 (2024), Chhava (2025) and Cocktail 2.

== Filmography ==
=== Films ===
Year	Title	Notes
2005		
2008	Hijack	
2009	Love Aaj Kal	
2012	Agent Vinod	
2012	Cocktail	
2013	Go Goa Gone	
2014	Lekar Hum Deewana Dil	
2014	Finding Fanny	
2014	Happy Ending	
2015	Badlapur	
2015	My Choice	Short film
2017	Hindi Medium	
2017	Raabta	Also director
2018	Stree	
2019	Luka Chuppi	
2019	Arjun Patiala	
2019	Made In China	
2019	Bala	
2020	Love Aaj Kal	
2020	Angrezi Medium	
2021	Roohi	
2021	Mimi	
2021	Shiddat	
2021	Hum Do Hamare Do	
2022	Dasvi	
2022	Bhediya	
2023	Chor Nikal Ke Bhaga	
2023	Zara Hatke Zara Bachke	
2023	Sajini Shinde Ka Viral Video	
2024	Teri Baaton Mein Aisa Uljha Jiya	
2024	Murder Mubarak	
2024	Munjya	co-produced with Amar Kaushik
2024	Stree 2	
2024	Sector 36	
2025
2025	Sky Force	
2025	Chhaava	
2025	Bhool Chuk Maaf	
2025	Tehran	
2025	Param Sundari	
2025	Thamma	
2026	Ikkis	
2026	Cocktail 2	

=== Television ===
Executive producer

- Chutzpah (2021)
- Saas, Bahu Aur Flamingo (2023)
- Jee Karda (2023)
