= Aditya Sarpotdar =

Indian film director

- Born: Mumbai, Maharashtra
- Occupations: Costume designer, Film director
- Father: Ajay Sarpotdar

Aditya Sarpotdar is an Indian director and costume designer best known for the 2015 film Classmates. His first movie as a director was Uladhaal, starring Ankush Chaudhari and Subodh Bhave.

== Personal life ==
Aditya is the son of Ajay Sarpotdar, former president of the Akhil Bharatiya Marathi Chitrapat Mahamandal, the apex Marathi film body, and the grandson of the filmmaker Vishwas Sarpotdar.

== Filmography ==
Key
†	Denotes films that have not yet been released

- All films are in Marathi, unless mentioned otherwise.

Year	Film	Language	Notes
2008	Uladhaal	Marathi	
2012	Satrangi Re	Marathi	
2013	Narbachi Wadi	Marathi	
2015	Classmates	Marathi	
2017	Faster Fene	Marathi	
2017	Thodi Thodi Si Manmaaniyan	Hindi	
2018	Mauli	Marathi	
2019	The Sholay Girl	Hindi	
2020	The Raikar Case	Hindi	
2022	Zombivli	Marathi	
2023	Unaad	Marathi	
2024	Munjya	Hindi	
2024	Kakuda	Hindi	
2025	Thamma	Hindi	
2027	Shakti Shalini †	Hindi	
TBA	Mahesh Cha Badla †	Marathi	
