= Munjya =

Folk legend from Maharashtra, India

In Hindu and Jain traditions, the muṇḍana ceremony marks a boy's entry into formal education, involving the tying of a sacred thread around the torso and a girdle made of munja grass around the waist, typically at the age of seven. He is known as Munjya when he puts on the munja grass girdle.

According to folklore in Maharashtra and the Konkan coast, Munjya is believed to be the ghosts of boys who died after this ceremony but before marriage, inhabiting peepal trees. Munjya's are described as restless bachelor ghosts who roam trees at night, possessing cleverness and multilingual abilities. While most Munjya's are not harmful, they may retaliate against those who defile their tree homes, potentially pelting offenders with stones or causing accidents. Some stories depict more malevolent Munjya's causing harm to humans, such as causing accidents or possessing living beings with dangerous intentions, including forcing them to commit acts of violence.

One feasible rationale for the belief in Munjya is that peepal trees, known for their expansive canopies, emit substantial carbon dioxide during the night. The apprehension surrounding Munjya probably deterred individuals from lingering under these trees after dusk.

== In popular culture ==
- The Hindi-language horror-thriller Munjya is based on this legend.
- Vikram Aur Munja, an animated TV show on Big Magic.
