= Munjya (film) =

2024 Indian film by Aditya Sarpotdar

- Theatrical release poster
- Directed by: Aditya Sarpotdar
- Written by: Niren Bhatt
- Story by: Yogesh Chandekar
- Produced by: Dinesh Vijan; Amar Kaushik
- Starring: Abhay Verma; Sharvari; Sathyaraj; Mona Singh
- Cinematography: Saurabh Goswami
- Edited by: Monisha R. Baldawa
- Music by: Songs: Sachin–Jigar; Score: Justin Varghese
- Production company: Maddock Films
- Distributed by: Pen Marudhar
- Release date: 7 June 2024
- Running time: 123 minutes
- Country: India
- Language: Hindi
- Budget: ₹30 crore
- Box office: est. ₹132.13 crore

Munjya is a 2024 Indian Hindi-language comedy horror film directed by Aditya Sarpotdar, written by Niren Bhatt from a story by Yogesh Chandekar, and produced by Dinesh Vijan and Amar Kaushik under Maddock Films. The film stars Abhay Verma, Sharvari, Sathyaraj and Mona Singh. The titular character was entirely created using CGI. The third installment in the Maddock Horror Comedy Universe, it focuses on a legend inspired by Indian folklore and mythology.

Munjya was theatrically released worldwide on 7 June 2024, garnering mixed-to-positive reviews from critics. The film emerged as a sleeper hit, grossing ₹132.13 crore worldwide against a production cost of ₹30 crore, becoming the eighth highest-grossing Hindi film of 2024. At the 70th Filmfare Awards, the film won the award for Best Special Effects.

== Plot ==
In 1952, in a village in Konkan, a boy named Gotya is obsessed with Munni, a neighbour seven years older than him. After a failed attempt to harm her suitor, he undergoes his munja ceremony while Munni is married off. Desperate to marry her, Gotya decides to perform a human sacrifice ritual beneath a peepal tree in the Chetukwadi forest, using his sister Gita as the intended victim. However, Gita escapes, and Gotya accidentally kills himself. His remains are buried beneath the tree to contain his vengeful spirit, which manifests as a supernatural entity called Munjya.

In present-day Pune, timid young Bittu works at his mother Pammi's beauty salon and shares a close bond with his grandmother, Gita. Heartbroken by the engagement of his childhood friend and crush, Bela, to her English companion Kuba, Bittu and his family travel to their ancestral village for his cousin Rukku's wedding. There, Bittu overhears a conversation between Gita and his uncle Balu about his late father's mysterious death, which is linked to the haunted peepal tree. Disturbed, Bittu visits the tree and inadvertently releases Munjya. Gita saves Bittu but is killed in the process.

Back in Pune, Munjya begins haunting Bittu, insisting that he arrange a marriage with Munni or Pammi will be harmed. Bittu confides in his cousin Spielberg, and the two learn from Rukku that Munni is Bela’s wheelchair-bound grandmother. Upon seeing Bela, who resembles a young Munni, Munjya shifts his obsession to her, planning to marry her by performing a ritual that involves transferring his soul into a goat (Parakāyapraveśa) and sacrificing Bela beneath the same tree.

Following advice from an eccentric exorcist named Elvis, Bittu, Spielberg, Pammi, and Bela travel back to the village under the pretence of filming an advertisement for Bela’s Zumba centre. Kuba also arrives but is attacked by the jealous Munjya. On the wedding day, the group transfers Munjya's soul into a goat by drawing a mystical symbol on its head and attempts to behead it to destroy him, but a drunken Bela draws the same symbol on her own forehead, causing Munjya to possess her while her soul enters the goat. As the possessed Bela attacks the group, Balu abducts the goat and presumably cooks it, allegedly transferring Bela’s spirit into him. Elvis draws the symbol on Balu's forehead to help Bela's soul return to her body, but it is revealed that a different goat was slaughtered. Munjya then possesses Balu, while Bela’s soul returns to her body. Bittu and Bela flee but are pursued by the possessed Balu. Guided by Gita’s spirit, Bittu overcomes his fears and subdues Munjya by trapping him within the peepal tree and setting it ablaze.

Later, Bittu confesses his love to Bela, but she prefers to remain friends. The final scene shows burnt logs from the peepal tree being transported elsewhere, hinting at Munjya’s lingering presence.

In the post-credits scene, Bhaskar is seen stranded naked in the forest. Jana brings him clothes, including underwear from the "Munni" brand, inadvertently attracting Munjya’s attention.

== Cast ==
Adapted from the opening and closing credits:

- Abhay Verma as Bittu
- Sharvari as Bela / young Munni
- Sathyaraj as Elvis Karim Prabhakar
- Mona Singh as Pammi, Bittu's mother
- Suhas Joshi as Gita (Ajii), Bittu's grandmother and Munjya's sister
  - Khushi Hajare as Young Gita
- Taranjot Singh as Diljit Singh Dhillon a.k.a. Spielberg
- Ajay Purkar as Balu Kaka
- Bhagyashree Limaye as Rukku
- Ayush Ulagadde as Gotya / Munjya
- Shruti Marathe as Gotya's mother
- Richard Lovatt as Kuba
- Anay Kamat as Gotya's father
- Padmini Sardesai as Munni Kanitkar a.k.a. "Akka"
- Shrikant Mohan Yadav as Jaggu
- Reema Chaudhary as Mahua
- Rasika Vengurlekar as lady in bus
- Radhika Vidyasagar as Savitri
- Akshay Vengulikar as Bittu's father
- Abhijeet Chavan as Doctor
- Abhishek Banerjee as Janardan aka "Jana" (cameo appearance)
- Varun Dhawan as Bhaskar (cameo appearance)

== Production ==
=== Inspiration ===
Talking with Mid-Day, Bhatt discussed the traditional four stages of life in Hinduism: Brahmacharya (student life), Gṛhastha (householder life), Vanaprastha (retirement), and Sannyasa (renunciation). He mentions the Upanayan ceremony known as Munja in Marathi, which marks the beginning of the student phase, and the Sod Munja ceremony, which marks the transition from student life to householder life. Essentially, he's explaining the significance of these ceremonies in the context of life's stages according to Hindu tradition. If a man passes away without getting married after his munja ceremony but before his Sod Munja, he transforms into a Munjya—a spirit dwelling in peepal trees or close to wells. Peepal trees emit significant amounts of carbon dioxide after nightfall, and the apprehension of encountering Munjya deters people from sitting under them after sunset. According to Bhatt, Munjya is perceived as a creature that is both monstrous and childlike due to dying at a young age. Munjya tends to trouble people to fulfill its desires, often fixating on marriage. Munjya's are not usually malevolent; rather, they are seen as immature and petty nuisances. They have a peculiar fondness for throwing stones at individuals standing beneath trees.

=== Development ===
Bhatt states that the tale initially entered their sphere through screenwriter Yogesh Chandekar, who introduced a renowned figure from his region to Maddock Films. Bhatt and Kaushik spent three years to developing the story, conducting research by exploring numerous wadas and orchards in the Dapoli and Ganpatipule regions where Munjya's are said to have been "tied down". Munjya is acclaimed as inaugural CGI film starring an animated character. The film is helmed by Aditya Sarpotdar, and explores the legendary creature from Indian folklore, according to a statement from the makers. Sarpotdar and his team, in collaboration with DNEG, spent nearly a year to crafting the eerie and mischievous main character entirely through computer-generated imagery. Sarpotdar explained in an interview with PTI, "Half of the film's budget went into VFX, a significant allocation underscoring its importance. We meticulously developed a CGI creature through extensive research and development to ensure accuracy".

=== Casting ===
Abhay Verma has been selected to star alongside Sharvari in the film. Describing her role, Sharvari mentioned, "I play a contemporary woman determined to pursue her dreams above all else, a sentiment many can identify with in today's world. Her dating experiences add to the relatability of the character, resonating with numerous women." The film features Mona Singh, Sathyaraj in other pivotal roles supported by Suhas Joshi, Ajay Purkar, and Bhagyashree Limaye. Singh opened her role in the film during an interview with ANI News, she cast in the role of Pammi, the mother of Bittu, played by Abhay. Pammi is depicted as strict and overly protective of her son, leading to a journey marked by various challenges and surprises. The Marathi actress Rasika Vengurlekar was seen in the teaser is playing a bit part in the film. Radhika Vidyasagar made her film debut, playing the role of housewife in Konkan.

=== Filming ===
The film was shot in Kudal and Guhagar in the Konkan region of Maharashtra.

== Music ==
Munjya

Soundtrack album by Sachin–Jigar
- Released: 17 June 2024
- Recorded: 2023
- Genre: Feature film soundtrack
- Length: 13:09
- Language: Hindi
- Label: Zee Music Company

Sachin–Jigar chronology
Murder Mubarak (2023)	Munjya (2024)	Stree 2 (2024)

Official audio
- Munjya (Audio Jukebox) on YouTube

Sachin–Jigar composed the music for the film, while "Hai Jamalo" is co-composed by Skeletron. Lyrics are written by Amitabh Bhattacharya.

Tracks
No.	Title	Singer(s)	Length
1.	"Taras"	Jasmine Sandlas, Sumonto Mukherjee, Sachin–Jigar	3:08
2.	"Tainu Khabar Nahi"	Arijit Singh, Sachin-Jigar	3:08
3.	"Hai Jamalo"	Nakash Aziz, Amitabh Bhattacharya, Jigar Saraiya	2:29
4.	"Lori"	Hansika Pareek, Sachin-Jigar	2:58
5.	"Tainu Khabar Nahi" (Climax Version)	Varun Jain	1:26
Total length:			13:09

== Release ==
=== Theatrical ===
The film was released on 7 June 2024 in cinemas.

=== Home media ===
The digital streaming rights were acquired by Disney+ Hotstar and it premiered on the streaming service from 25 August 2024. The film was first premiered on 24 August 2024 on Television channel named Stargold.

== Reception ==
=== Box office ===
Munja grossed approximately ₹4 crore on its first day and ₹35.30 crore in its first week. In two weeks, it grossed around ₹70 crore. With a production budget of ₹30 crore, the film grossed ₹127.95 crore in India and ₹4.18 crore internationally during its theatrical run, for a total worldwide gross of ₹132.13 crore.

=== Critical reception ===
Munjya received mixed-to-positive reviews from critics, with praise for its storyline, humour and visual effects, but criticism for its screenplay and pacing. On the review aggregator website Rotten Tomatoes, 56% of 9 critics' reviews are positive, with an average rating of 5.3/10.

Bhawna Arya of Times Now rated the film 3.5 stars out of 5 and wrote "In conclusion, Munjya appears to be an entertaining film that successfully combines elements of comedy and horror. While it may not satisfy hardcore horror fans, it promises to be a fun and thrilling ride for those who enjoy a good laugh with their scares." Ganesh Aaglave of Firstpost rated the film 3.5 stars out of 5 and wrote "Film aces in the technical departments, especially in VFX, camera and SFX with crisp editing. Talking about the performances, everyone in the cast has done a splendid job but it’s a VFX character of Munjya, who has stolen the show. Munjya is a theatrical experience and deserves a watch for its novelty and authenticity."

A critic for Bollywood Hungama rated the film 3 stars out of 5 and wrote "Munjya is an entertaining horror-comedy with a gripping second half. At the box office, the film might start slow but it has the potential to pick up due to the genre, word of mouth and connection with the Maddock Cinematic Universe." Dhaval Roy of The Times of India rated the film 3 stars out of 5 and wrote "The movie leaves some questions unanswered, and certain elements fail to add up. Nevertheless, the atmospheric setting, hilarious moments, and engaging performances make it an entertaining watch, especially for viewers seeking a horror- comedy experience with a youthful energy."

Shubhra Gupta of The Indian Express rated the film 2/5. Rishil Jogani of Pinkvilla rated the film 2.5 stars out of 5 and wrote "Munjya has redeeming qualities but the irritating monster, formulaic tropes and the outrageous climax make it the horror show that it doesn't intend to be." Saibal Chatterjee of NDTV rated the film 1.5 stars out of 5 and wrote "Munjya is the sort of film that you want off your back as desperately as Bittu wants Munjya off his! It outlives its welcome well before it is into its second half. It is easy to see that a great deal of effort has gone into its making. What it yields is hardly commensurate."
