= Filmfare Award for Best Special Effects =

Annual award for Hindi films

The Filmfare Best Special Effects Award is given by the Filmfare magazine as part of its annual Filmfare Awards for Hindi films. It was first awarded in 2007, when five films, Dhoom 2, Don - The Chase Begins Again, Jaan-E-Mann, Krrish and Rang De Basanti, were nominated. Krrish became the inaugural winner of the award.

== Multiple wins ==
| Wins | Recipient |
|---|---|
| 5 | Red Chillies VFX |
| 2 | NY VFXWAALA |
| 2 | ReDefine |

== List ==
| Year | Film | Recipient |
|---|---|---|
| 2024 | Munjya | ReDefine |
| 2023 | Jawan | Red Chillies VFX |
| 2022 | Brahmāstra: Part One – Shiva | Dneg, ReDefine |
| 2021 | Sardar Udham | NY VFXWAALA and Edit FX Studios |
| 2020 | Tanhaji | Prasad Sutar for NY VFXWAALA |
| 2019 | War | Sherry Bharda And Vishal Anand for YFX |
| 2018 | Zero | Red Chillies VFX |
| 2017 | Fan | Red Chillies VFX |
| 2016 | Bombay Velvet | Prana Studios |
| 2014 | Dhoom 3 | Tata Elxsi |
| 2012 | Ra.One | Red Chillies VFX |
| 2010 | Kaminey | Govardhan Vigraham |
| 2009 | Love Story 2050 | Weta Workshop and John Cox |
| 2008 | Om Shanti Om | Red Chillies VFX |
| 2007 | Krrish | Marc Kolbe & Craig Mumma, Sham Kaushal |
