= Jaypee =

Jaypee may refer to:

- Jaypee Group, Indian conglomerate company based in Noida, Uttar Pradesh
  - Jaypee Sports City, sports complex in Greater Noida, India
    - Jaypee Group Circuit, motor racing circuit in Jaypee sports city
  - Jaypee Institutes and Universities, private universities of the Jaypee Group in India
    - Jaypee Institute of Information Technology, in Noida
    - Jaypee University of Engineering and Technology, in Guna, Madhya Pradesh
    - Jaypee University of Information Technology, in Solan, Himachal Pradesh
    - Jaypee University, Anoopshahr, in Bulandshahr, Uttar Pradesh
- Jaypee Brothers, Indian medical publisher based in New Delhi
- Jaypee de Guzman, Filipino child actor
- Jaypee Institute (disambiguation)
- Jaypee University (disambiguation)

== See also ==
- JP (disambiguation)
