= Jaypee University =

Jaypee University refers to universities belonging to the Jaypee Group and may refer to:

- Jaypee University, Anoopshahr
- Jaypee Institute of Information Technology, Noida
- Jaypee University of Information Technology, Waknaghat
- Jaypee University of Engineering and Technology, Guna
