= List of awards and nominations received by Kriti Sanon =

Kriti Sanon awards and nominations
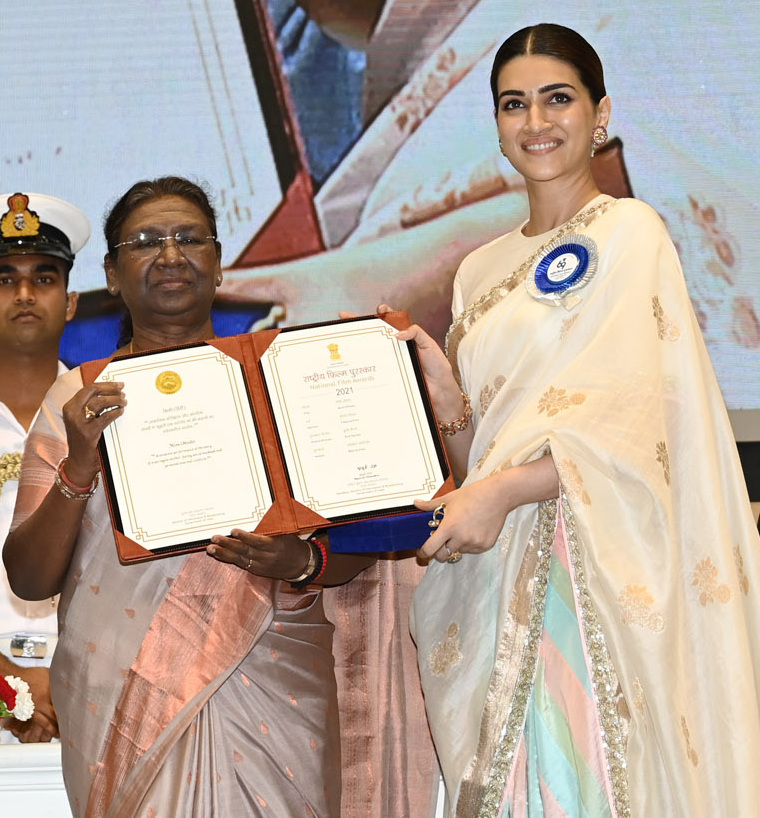
- President of India Droupadi Murmu presenting Sanon with the National Film Award for Best Actress for Mimi
Awards and nominations
Award	Wins	Nominations
National Film Awards	1	N/A
Filmfare Awards	2	3
Filmfare OTT Awards	0	1
Screen Awards	1	3
Zee Cine Awards	2	6
SIMA Awards	0	1
Stardust Awards	0	1
Star Guild Awards	1	1
IIFA Awards	3	3
Big Star Entertainment Awards	1	1
Indian Television Academy Awards	0	2
Iconic Gold Awards	4	4
Others	15	21

Totals (Note: Certain award groups do not simply award one winner. They acknowledge several different recipients, have runners-up, and have third place. Since this is a specific recognition and is different from losing an award, runner-up mentions are considered wins in this award tally. For simplification and to avoid errors, each award in this list has been presumed to have had a prior nomination.)
- Wins: 28
- Nominations: 44

Kriti Sanon is an Indian actress who works predominantly in Hindi cinema. She is the recipient of 24 accolades into her credit. These include two Filmfare Awards, three IIFA Awards and a Zee Cine Award. Sanon won the National Film Award for Best Actress for her performance in the title role of a surrogate mother in the comedy-drama Mimi (2021).

== Film awards ==
Year	Award	Category	Film	Result	Ref.
2014	South Indian International Movie Awards	Best Female Debut Telugu	1: Nenokkadine	Nominated	
2015	Stardust Awards	Superstar of Tomorrow Female	Heropanti	Nominated	
2015	Big Star Entertainment Awards	Most Entertaining Debut Actress	Heropanti	Won	
2015	Producers Guild Film Awards	Best Female Debut	Heropanti	Won	
2015	Screen Awards	Best Female Debut	Heropanti	Nominated	
2015	Filmfare Awards	Best Female Debut	Heropanti	Won	
2015	International Indian Film Academy Awards	Star Debut of the Year Female	Heropanti	Won	
2018	Hello Hall of Fame	Rising Star of the Year	Bareilly Ki Barfi	Won	
2018	Zee Cine Awards	Best Actor Female	Bareilly Ki Barfi	Nominated	
2018	Screen Awards	Best Actress	Bareilly Ki Barfi	Nominated	
2020	Zee Cine Awards	Best Actor Female	Luka Chuppi	Nominated	
2021	National Film Awards	Best Actress	Mimi	Won	
2022	Hello Hall of Fame	Best Actress Popular Choice	Mimi	Won	
2022	International Indian Film Academy Awards	Best Actress	Mimi	Won	
2022	Filmfare Awards	Best Actress	Mimi	Won	
2022	Iconic Gold Awards	Best Actress Film Popular	Mimi	Won	
2022	Indian Television Academy Awards	Best Actress Film OTT	Mimi	Nominated	
2023	Zee Cine Awards	Best Actor Female	Bhediya	Nominated	
2025	IIFA Digital Awards	Best Actress Film	Do Patti	Won	
2025	Iconic Gold Awards	Best Actress OTT Critics	Do Patti	Won	
2025	Iconic Gold Awards	Best Actress Film Popular	Teri Baaton Mein Aisa Uljha Jiya	Won	
2025	Zee Cine Awards	Best Actor Female Jury	Teri Baaton Mein Aisa Uljha Jiya	Won	
2025	Zee Cine Awards	Best Actor Female	Teri Baaton Mein Aisa Uljha Jiya	Nominated	
2025	Filmfare Awards	Best Actress	Teri Baaton Mein Aisa Uljha Jiya	Nominated	
2025	Bollywood Hungama India Entertainment Awards	Actor of the Year Female	Do Patti	Won	
2025	Filmfare OTT Awards	Best Actor Female	Do Patti	Nominated	
2025	Indian Television Academy Awards	Best Actress OTT Film Jury	Do Patti	Nominated	
2026	Zee Cine Awards	Best Actor Female	Tere Ishk Mein	Won	
2026	Zee Cine Awards	Best Actor Female Jury	Tere Ishk Mein	Nominated	
2026	Screen Awards	Best Actress	Tere Ishk Mein	Nominated	
2026	Pinkvilla Screen and Style Icons Awards	Best Actress Popular Choice	Tere Ishk Mein	Won	

== Other awards ==
Year	Award	Category	Result	Ref.
2018	International Indian Film Academy Awards	Style Icon of the Year	Won	
2019	Lokmat Stylish Awards	Most Stylish Entertainer	Won	
2022	Pinkvilla Screen and Style Icons Awards	Super Stylish Female Readers Choice	Won	
2022	Femina Beauty Awards	Style Icon of the Year	Won	
2023	Navbharat Awards	Women of the Year	Won	
2023	Bollywood Hungama Style Icons	Most Stylish Leading Entertainer of the Year Female	Nominated	
2023	Bollywood Hungama Style Icons	Most Stylish Power-Packed Performer of the Year Female	Won	
2023	Bollywood Hungama Style Icons	Most Stylish Ground Breaking Star of the Year Female	Nominated	
2024	Bollywood Hungama Style Icons	Most Stylish Power-Packed Performer of the Year Female	Nominated	
2024	Bollywood Hungama Style Icons	Most Stylish Leading Entertainer of the Year Female	Nominated	
2024	Bollywood Hungama Style Icons	Most Stylish Ground Breaking Star of the Year	Nominated	
2024	Grazia Beauty Superstars	Beauty Entrepreneur of the Year	Won	
2024	Elle Beauty Awards	Beautypreneur of the Year	Won	
2024	Harper's Bazaar Awards	Women of the Year	Won	
2025	Bollywood Hungama Style Icons	Most Loved Youth Idol of the Year Female	Nominated	
2025	Elle Beauty Awards	Beautypreneur of the Year	Won	
2025	Bollywood Hungama OTT India Fest	Youth Icon of the Year Female	Nominated	
