= Jaypee Institute =

Jaypee Institute may refer to:

- Jaypee Institute of Information Technology, Noida
- Jaypee University of Information Technology, Waknaghat
- Jaypee University of Engineering and Technology, Guna
