= Raanjhan =

Song performed by Parampara Tandon

- Raanjhan song cover featuring actors Kriti Sanon and Shaheer Sheikh

Song by Parampara Tandon

from the album Do Patti
- Language: Hindi
- Released: 4 October 2024
- Recorded: 2023
- Length: 4:00
- Label: T-Series
- Composer: Sachet–Parampara
- Lyricist: Kausar Munir

Music video
- "Raanjhan" on YouTube

"Raanjhan" (transl. Beloved one) is an Indian Hindi-language song for the soundtrack album of the 2024 Netflix Hindi film Do Patti. It was performed by Parampara Tandon with music composed by the duo Sachet–Parampara. The lyrics were penned by Kausar Munir. The song was released on 4 October 2024. It was the first single released from the film's soundtrack. The music video of the song is picturised on the lead pair of the film, Kriti Sanon and Shaheer Sheikh. It hints at the film's central mystery, showing Kriti's character drinking at a club in sadness while Shaheer looks on disapprovingly.

According to a review from Business Standard, "Raanjhan" effectively captures the "pain and longing that follow a breakup". The publication noted that the calming melody and lyrics resonated with audiences. "Raanjhan" accumulated over 300 million streams on Spotify. The song peaked at #1 on "India Songs" for consecutive five weeks through 5 April 2025 to 3 May 2025. The song peaked at #3 on "Official Asian Music Chart" for consecutive three weeks through 3 January 2025 to 17 January 2025. It also entered the "Billboard Global 200" chart and peaked at the 194th position in the week of 26 April 2025. "Raanjhan" peaked at #86 on the "Billboard Global Excl. US" chart, in the week of 26 April 2025. On the "UAE Mena Chart", the song peaked at #11, in the week of 28 March 2025.

In August 2025, nearly a year after its release, "Raanjhan" was at the center of a plagiarism controversy. International music producer KMKZ had claimed that the T-Series label and the composing duo Sachet-Parampara had copied his beats without permission or credit. In response, the composing duo denied the plagiarism claims and also announced they are pursuing legal action, including filing a defamation case against the producer.
