= JP =

JP may refer to:

== Arts and media ==
- JP (album), 2001, by American singer Jesse Powell
- Jp (magazine), an American Jeep magazine
- Jönköpings-Posten, a Swedish newspaper
- Jovem Pan, a Brazilian radio station, based in São Paulo
- TV Jovem Pan, a Brazilian television station, based in São Paulo
- Jyllands-Posten, a Danish newspaper
- J.P. Shibayama, a Digimon Frontier character
- JP, a Street Fighter character

== People ==
- JP (musician) (born 1984), American singer-songwriter
- JP Duminy (born 1984), South African cricket player
- J.P. (rapper) (born 2004), American rapper
- Jean Pormanove (1979–2025), French streamer also known as JP
- Jayaprakash Narayan (1902–1979), Indian independence activist
- Jonathan Putra (born 1982), British–American actor and television host
- JP Pietersen, (born 1986) South African rugby player
- Jordan Peterson (born 1962), Canadian psychologist, author and pundit
- J. P. Crawford (born 1995), American baseball player
- JP Hurlbert (born 2008), American ice hockey player
- JP Karliak (born 1981), American actor, voice actor and comedian
- J. P. McManus (born 1951), Irish businessman
- JP Sears (born 1981), American conservative YouTuber and comedian
- JP Tokoto (born 1993), American basketball player, now in Israel's premier league
- J. P. Nadda (born 1960), Indian politician and lawyer
- J. P. Souzalin (1904–1976), Indian playwright and theatre director
- Kim Jong-pil (1926–2018), Korean politician, former Prime Minister of South Korea
- JP Richardson, co-founder and CEO of Exodus

== Places ==
- Japan (ISO 3166-1 country code: JP)
- Jamaica Plain, Massachusetts, neighborhood of Boston, U.S.
- Jaipur Junction railway station (station code: JP), Rajasthan, India

== Political parties ==
- Jatiya Party (disambiguation), several parties in Bangladesh
- Janata Party, India
- Jubilee Party, Kenya
- Justice Party (South Korea)

== Science and technology ==
- .jp, the Internet country-code top-level domain for Japan
- Jackson-Pratt drain, a surgical drain
- Military prefix for jet propellant fuels such as JP-4, JP-7, JP-8
- "JP", Formula 3 cars built by Joe Potts
- Julian Period

== Other uses ==
- Justice of the peace, a judicial officer
- Adria Airways (IATA code: JP)

== See also ==
- Jaypee (disambiguation)
- JPS (disambiguation)
- Jean-Pierre (disambiguation)
- Jean-Pierre (given name)
