= JPS =

JPS may refer to:

== Businesses and organizations ==
- Jamaica Public Service, the electricity utility in Jamaica
- Jamestown Public Schools (disambiguation)
- Japan Pension Service
- Japan Photographic Society (19th century)
- Japan Photographic Society (1924–)
- Japan Professional Photographers Society
- Jefferson Pilot Sports, now called Lincoln Financial Sports, a sports production company
- Jewish Publication Society
  - Jewish Publication Society of America Version, an English-language Bible translation from 1917
  - New Jewish Publication Society of America Tanakh (JPS Tanakh), an English-language Bible translation from 1985
- Independent Jewish Press Service (active in the 1940s)
- John Peter Smith Hospital in Fort Worth, Texas, United States
- John Player & Sons, a former cigarette manufacturer and current tobacco brand
- John Player Special, a British and Canadian cigarette brand
- Jyväskylän Seudun Palloseura, a Finnish sport club
- Physical Society of Japan

== Schools and school districts ==
- J. P. Stevens High School, in Middlesex County, New Jersey, United States
- Jackson Public School District, in Mississippi, United States
- Jackson Public Schools (Michigan), in the United States
- Jonesboro Public Schools, in Arkansas, United States

== Other uses ==
- JPEG Stereoscopic, a 3D image format
- JPS Experience, a rock band
- John Paul Stevens, Associate Justice of the Supreme Court of the United States (1975-2010)
- John Philip Sousa, American composer
- Jump point search, a routing algorithm

== See also ==
- JP (disambiguation)
