= JP1 =

JP1 may refer to:

- JP1 remote, a universal remote
- Joss JP1, an Australian supercar
- JP-1, Jet Propellant 1, an early jet fuel
- Pope John Paul I
- Jurassic Park (film), the 1993 film, first in the Jurassic Park film series
- JP1, Hitachi's System Management Software

== See also ==
- JP (disambiguation)
