= Jean Pierre (priest) =

Breton missionary and martyr (1831–1873)

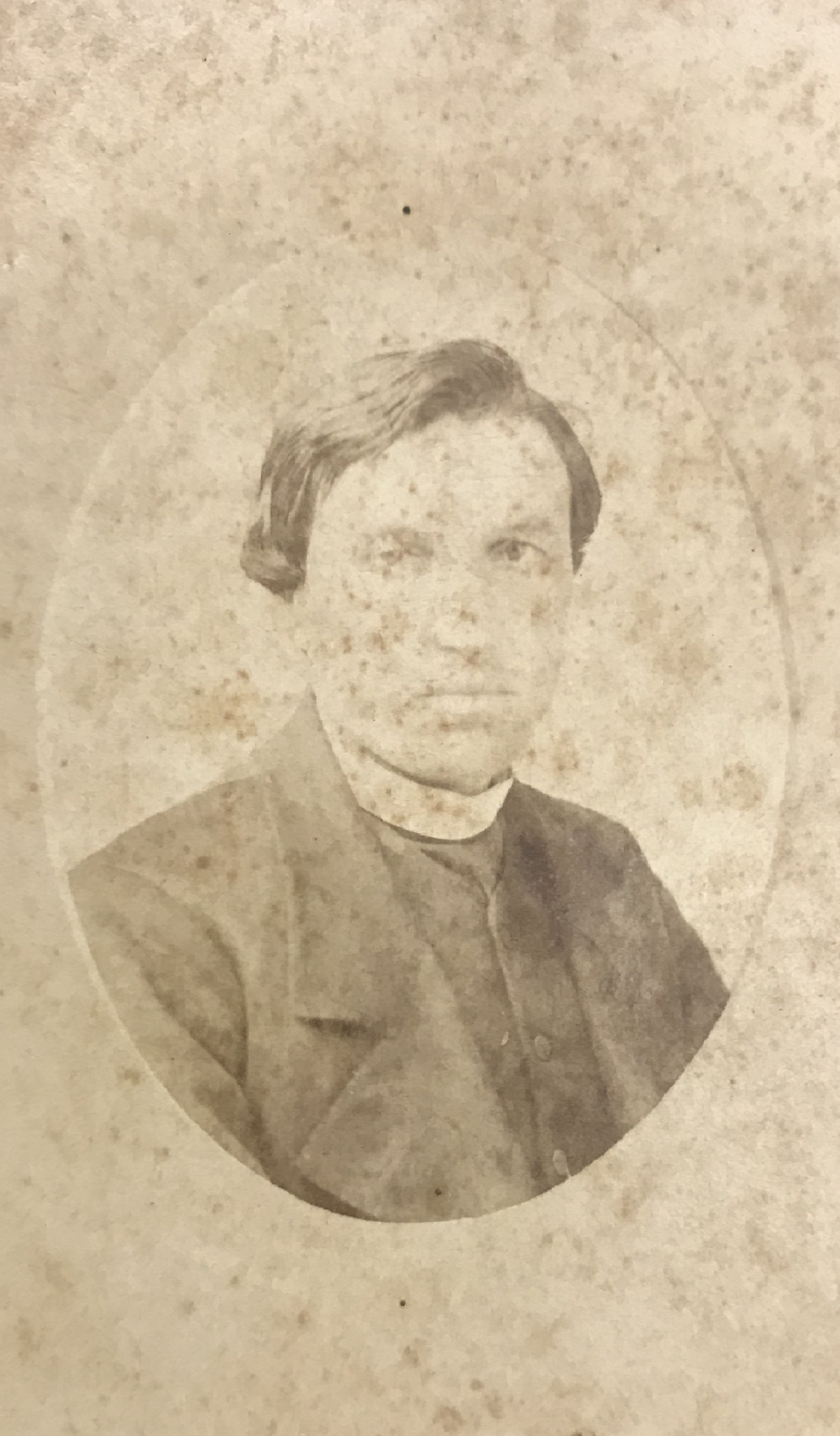
Photograph of Father Jean Pierre, photographer unknown, circa 1860s Shreveport. Files of the Diocese of Alexandria, Louisiana.

Jean Pierre (29 September 1831 – 16 September 1873) was one of five Breton missionary priests to Louisiana who made a sacrifice of their lives in the 1873 Yellow Fever Epidemic in Shreveport, Louisiana. The group is collectively known as the Shreveport Martyrs. On December 8, 2020, Bishop Francis Malone of the Diocese of Shreveport declared him to be a Servant of God, opening the diocesan phase of inquiry into a Cause of Beatification and Canonization. In 2022, the Vatican's Dicastery for the Causes of Saints permitted Father Pierre and the other four Shreveport Martyrs to proceed for consideration as a single Cause. Peter B. Mangum serves as the Episcopal Delegate for the Cause.

Born in Lanloup, France to Guillame and Claudine Pierre, he entered the Petit Seminaire de Tréguier on 3 August 1845, weeks before his fourteenth birthday. He joined a student association known as The Congregation of the Most Holy Virgin, a community dedicated to the cultivation of deeper personal piety. This association required a formal written pledge which Pierre signed, which reads, “after satisfying a time of approval, Jean Pierre of Lanloup is received into the Congregation of the Most Holy Virgin established in the ecclesiastical school.”

On 1 October 1852, Pierre entered the Grand Seminaire de Saint-Brieuc. A signed document from the bishop of Saint-Brieuc, Jacques-Jean-Pierre Le Mée, acknowledged Pierre’s placement as second in his graduating class. Bishop Augustus Marie Martin recruited him to come to the newly erected Diocese of Natchitoches in Louisiana and Pierre departed the port of Le Havre on 8 October 1854.

Ordained to the priesthood for the Diocese of Natchitoches on 22 September 1855, Pierre's first assignment was the construction of a church and rectory at Bayou Pierre, Louisiana. He completed this by mid-1856, when Bishop Martin assigned him to the task of building a permanent church for Shreveport. Pierre became the first pastor of Holy Trinity Catholic Church (Shreveport, Louisiana) and was serving there when the Yellow Fever Epidemic of 1873 struck the city.

Pierre was among the first to volunteer for the relief effort that the Howard Association organized in the city on 2 September. He worked with his assistant pastor, Isidore Quémerais, along with religious sisters from the Daughters of the Cross Convent in Shreveport, to care for fever victims in what was designated as Fever Ward Number 1 (most of downtown Shreveport). Pierre and his assistant pastor fell ill with the fever within the first ten days of their field hospital mission work, and Pierre succumbed to the disease on 16 September 1873, just one day after Father Quémerais died. At Father Pierre's bedside to administer the final sacraments of the Catholic Church was Father Jean Marie Biler, chaplain of the Daughters of the Cross, who was the third Shreveport priest to respond to the fever-stricken city and who then took the place of Pierre in leading a compassionate relief effort.

Pierre was originally buried beneath the church he built in Shreveport, Holy Trinity Catholic Church (Shreveport, Louisiana), before his remains were moved in 1884 to St. Joseph's Catholic Cemetery in Shreveport. There he is buried with three of the other Shreveport Martyrs beneath a large Calvary monument.
