= Jean-Pierre (given name) =

Jean-Pierre is a French male given name (in English "John-Peter"). It may refer to:

- Jean-Pierre Aumont (1911–2001), a French actor
- Jean-Pierre Bataille (born 1963), French politician
- Jean-Pierre Bemba (b. 1962), a Congolese politician and rebel leader
- Jean-Pierre Blanchard (1753–1809), a French inventor and aviation pioneer
- Jean-Pierre Cassel (1932–2007), a French actor
- Jean-Pierre Changeux (b. 1936), a French neuroscientist
- Jean-Pierre Chantin (born 1961), a French historian of religion
- Jean-Pierre Chauveau (b. 1942), a French politician
- Jean-Pierre Chevènement (b. 1939), a French politician
- Jean-Pierre Claris de Florian (1755–1794), a French poet and romance writer
- Jean-Pierre Corteggiani (1942–2022), a French Egyptologist
- Jean-Pierre Côté (1926–2002), a Canadian politician
- Jean-Pierre Dardenne (b. 1951), the elder of the Dardenne brothers filmmaking duo
- Jean-Pierre Demailly (1957–2022), a French mathematician
- Jean-Pierre Egger (1943–2025), a Swiss shot putter
- Jean-Pierre Elkabbach (1937—2023), a French journalist
- Jean-Pierre Faye (1925–2026), a French philosopher and writer of fiction and prose poetry
- Jean Pierre Flourens (1794–1867), a French physiologist and pioneer in anesthesia
- Jean-Pierre Foucault (b. 1947), a French television host
- Jean-Pierre Gorin (b. 1943), a French filmmaker and professor
- Jean-Pierre Grivois, French writer and music schola
- Jean-Pierre Haigneré (b. 1948), a French astronaut
- Jean-Pierre Houdin (b. 1951), a French architect
- Jean-Pierre Jeunet (b. 1953), a French film director
- Jean-Pierre Léaud (b. 1944), a French actor
- Jean-Pierre Mader (b. 1955), a French singer-songwriter
- Jean-Pierre Melville (1917–1973), a French film director
- Jean-Pierre Papin (b. 1963), a French football player and manager
- Jean-Pierre Protzen (1934–2021), Swiss architect
- Jean-Pierre Pury (1675–1736), Swiss explorer
- Jean-Pierre Raffarin (b. 1948), a French politician
- Jean-Pierre Rampal (1922–2000), a French flautist
- Jean-Pierre Richard (1922–2019), a French writer and literary critic
- Jean-Pierre Rouget (b. 1941), a French racing driver
- Jean-Pierre Serre (b. 1926), a French mathematician
- Jean-Pierre Thiollet (b. 1956), a French writer
- Jean-Pierre Tokoto (b. 1993), American basketball player for Hapoel Tel Aviv of the Israeli Basketball Premier League
- Jean-Pierre Verdet (b. 1932), a French astronomer and historian of astronomy
- Jean-Pierre Vernant (1914–2007), a French historian and anthropologist
- Jean-Pierre Vigier (b. 1969), French politician
- Jean-Pierre Vigier (1920–2004), French physicist
- Jean-Pierre Winter (1951–2025), French psychoanalyst and writer
- Jean Pierre (priest) (1831–1873), Breton missionary priest
- Jean Pierre (Rwandan informant), an anonymous Rwandan informant to Roméo Dallaire in the run-up to the 1994 Rwandan Genocide

Fictional characters bearing the name include:

- Jean-Pierre (Metalocalypse character), the chef in American animated television series "Metalocalypse"
- Jean-Pierre Delmas, the father of Elisabeth Delmas and headmaster of Kadic Junior High School in the French animated television series Code Lyoko
- Jean Pierre, a character in Fighter's History
- Jean-Pierre Polnareff (1989), the French crusader possessing Silver Chariot in JoJo's Bizarre Adventure: Stardust Crusaders and later making an appearance in Golden Wind.
- Jean Pierre Colored Pencils the 12th, the first member of the Legion of Stationery in Paper Mario: The Origami King, and the second major boss of said game.
- Jean-Pierre LaFitte, the mid-90s WWF wrestler who was billed as a descendant of the pirate Jean LaFitte

== See also ==
- Jean (male given name)
- John (given name)
- Pierre
- Peter (given name)
