= IIFA Award for Style Icon of the Year =

Film award in India

The IIFA Style Icon Award is chosen by the viewers and was given on behalf of Samsung and then International Drama and Theatre Education Association-IDEA later on. The recipient also gets prizes such as a TV.

== Multiple wins ==
Wins	Recipient
3	Hrithik Roshan

== Winners ==
Year	Winner
2003	Fardeen Khan
2004	Saif Ali Khan
2005	Hrithik Roshan
2007	Hrithik Roshan
2008	Abhishek Bachchan
2009	Hrithik Roshan
2017	Alia Bhatt
2018	Kriti Sanon

== See also ==
- IIFA Awards
- Bollywood
- Cinema of India
