= Shreveport Martyrs =

Group of five martyered Catholic priests

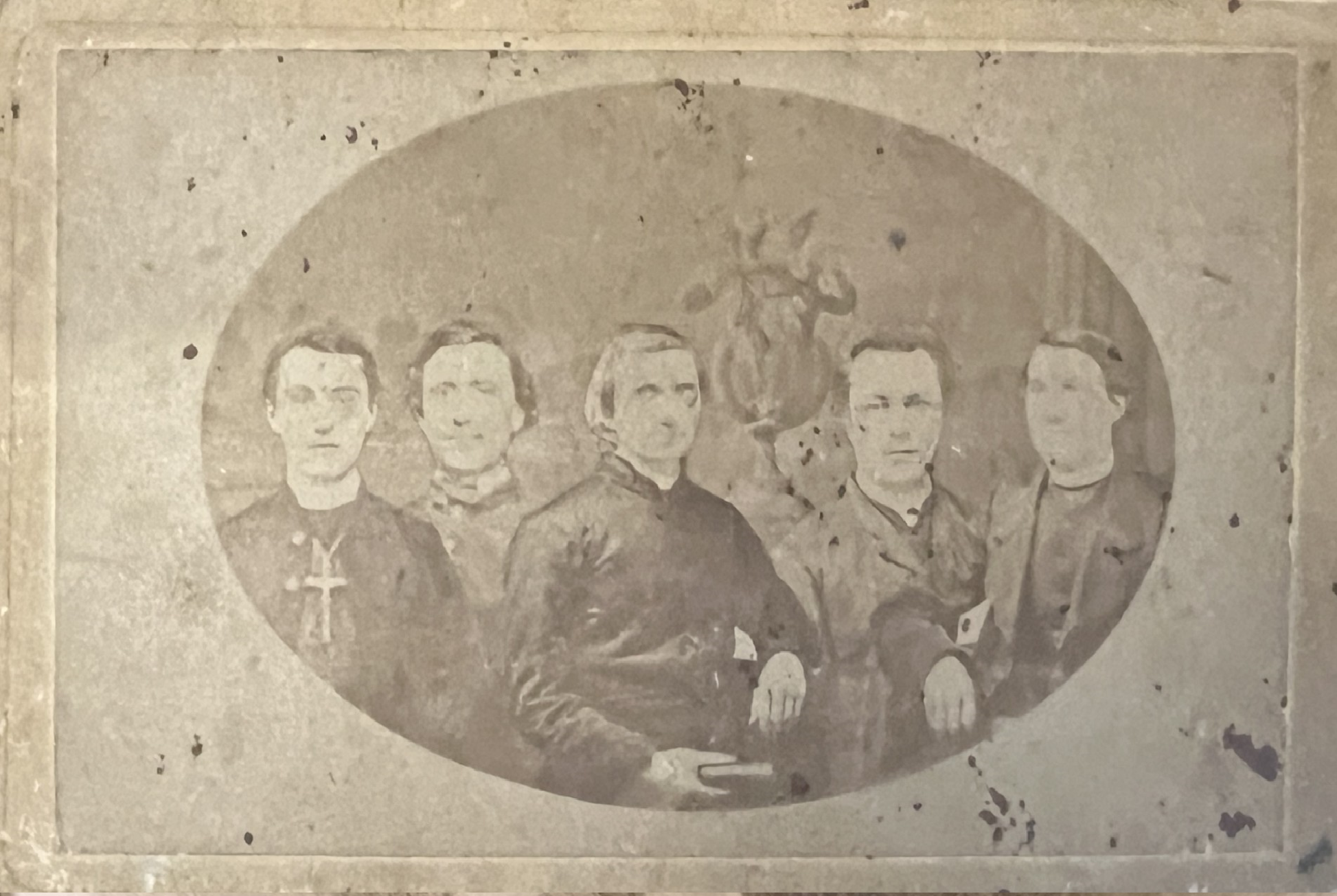
Earliest known photographic composite of the five Shreveport Martyrs, circa 1870s.

The Shreveport Martyrs were five Roman Catholic priests who died while caring for individuals affected by the 1873 Yellow Fever Epidemic of Shreveport, Louisiana. All five were missionary priests from Brittany, France, who came to serve the Diocese of Natchitoches under Augustus Marie Martin. They are (listed in the order of their deaths): Isidore Quémerais of Pleine-Fougères, Jean Pierre of Lanloup, Jean-Marie Biler of Plourivo, Louis Gergaud of Heric, and Francois Le Vézouët of Brélidy.

== Events and martyrdom ==
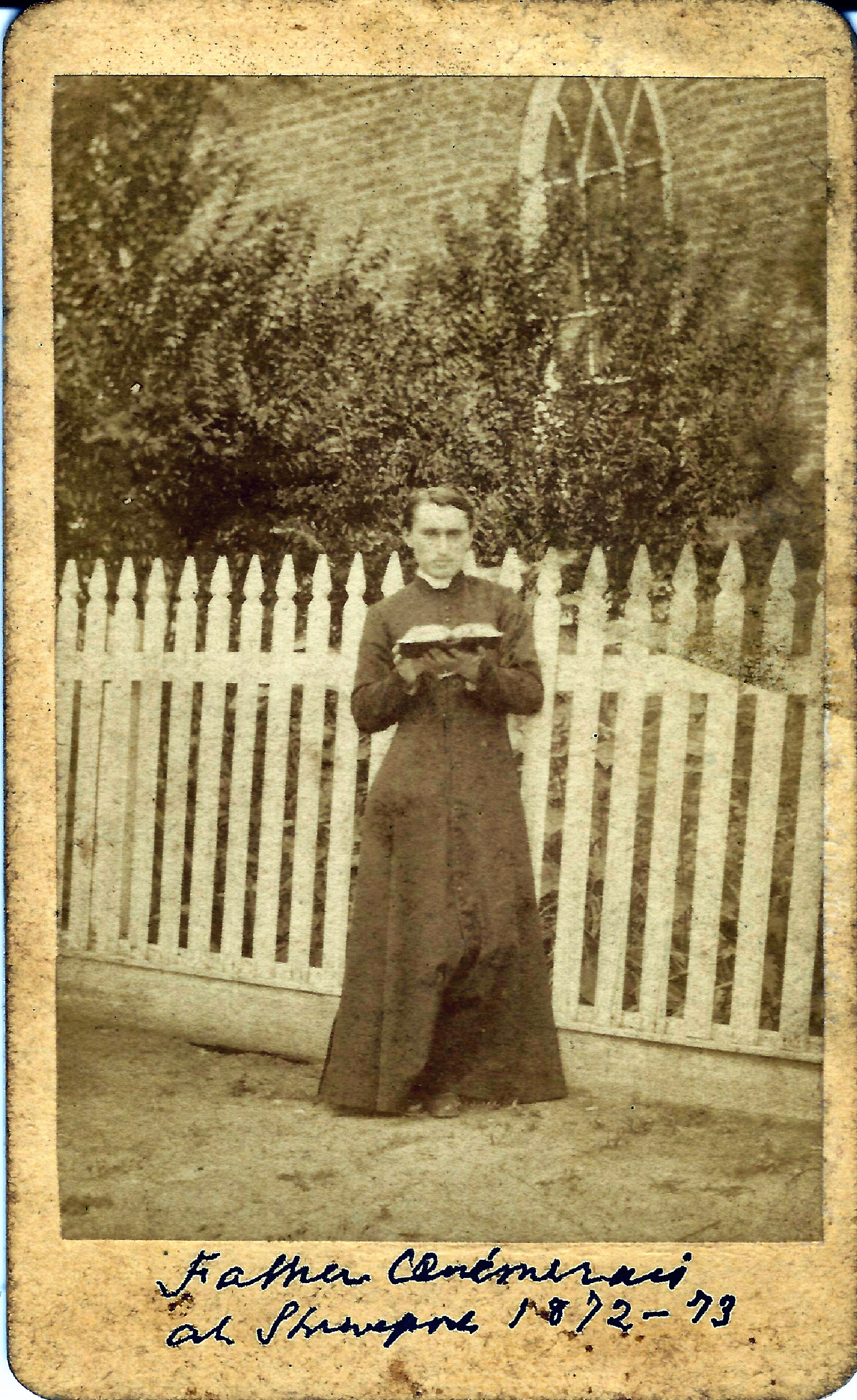
Photograph of Père Quémerais outside Holy Trinity Church, Shreveport (1872).

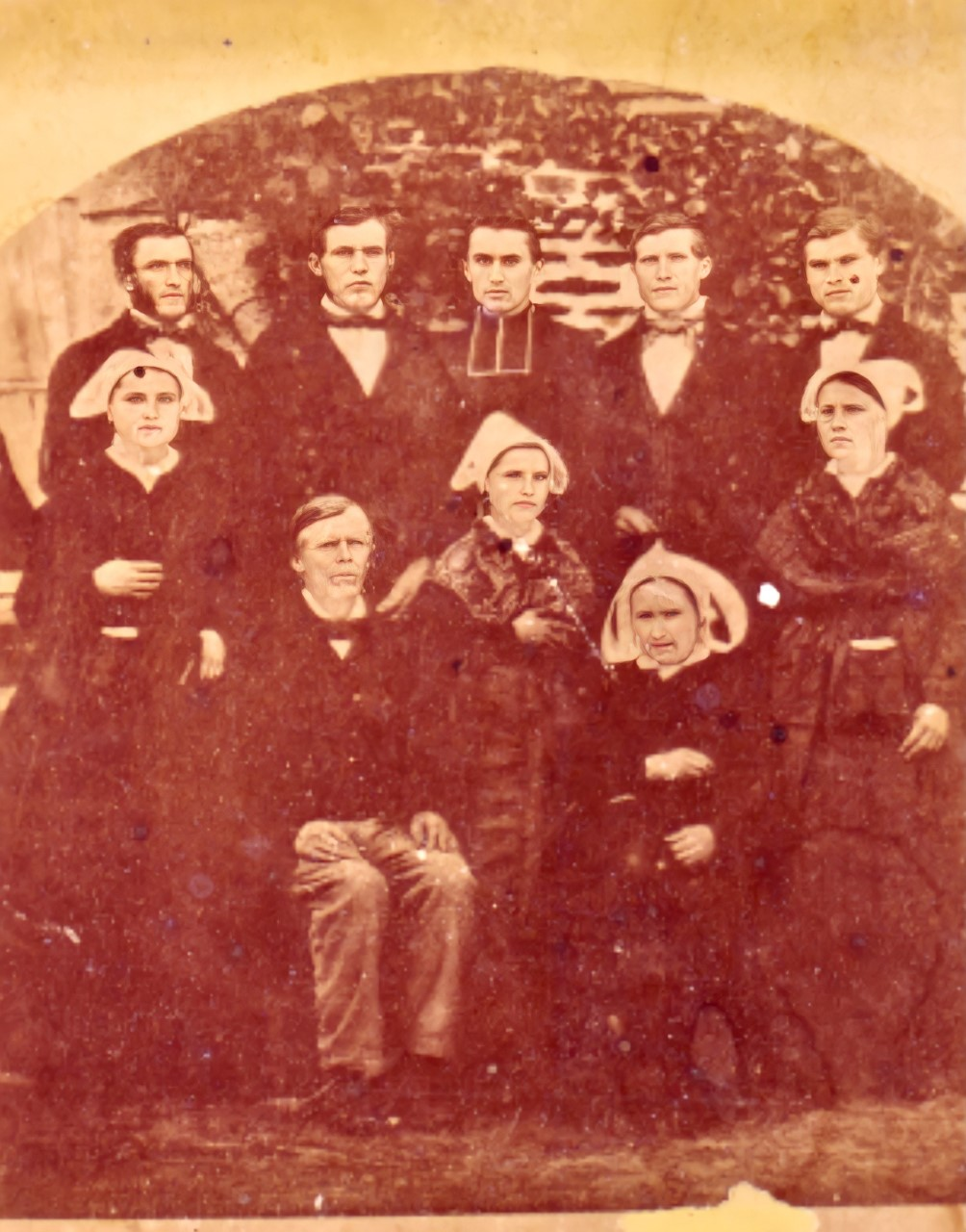
Père Quémerais with his family in Pleine-Fougeres, France (c. 1870).

During a large-scale epidemic of yellow fever, the city of Shreveport lost one-quarter of its population within twelve weeks, from August 21 to November 18, 1873. The original humanitarian response was led by Jean Pierre, pastor of Holy Trinity Catholic Church (Shreveport, Louisiana), and his assistant, Isidore Quémerais. When they both contracted the disease by mid-September, Pierre appealed to Jean-Marie Biler for assistance. Biler was chaplain of the Daughters of the Cross community at Fairfield, approximately two miles from the town center. Biler responded and was able to provide the final Sacrament for Quémerais and Pierre, who died on September 15 and 16, respectively. Soon ill with yellow fever, Biler sent for the assistance of Louis Gergaud of Monroe, Louisiana, and Francois Le Vézouët of Natchitoches, Louisiana. Both priests arrived just before the death of Biler on September 26. While continuing to minister to the ill and dying, Gergaud contracted the disease and died on October 1, and Le Vezouet died soon after on October 8.

== Promotion of sainthood ==
In December 2020, Francis Malone of the Diocese of Shreveport recognized the five priests as Servants of God, thereby beginning the Diocesan phase of inquiry for the Cause of Beatification and Canonization. The Vatican's Dicastery for the Causes of Saints combined the five to be considered as a single cause. At its 2023 plenary session, the United States Conference of Catholic Bishops gave its unanimous assent to the Cause. The Diocesan Tribunal, gathering testimony and assessing the report of the Historical Commission, will refer their Cause for the commencement of the Roman phase. Peter B. Mangum serves as the Episcopal Delegate for the Cause.

The Cause for Beatification and Canonization for the Shreveport Martyrs is based upon the 2017 motu proprio of Pope Francis entitled Maiorem Hac Dilectionem (No Greater Love), which provided a new way forward for beatification for those who, “inspired by charity, have heroically offered their life for their neighbour, freely and voluntarily accepting certain and untimely death in their determination to follow Jesus."

In the earliest public record following the epidemic, the five priests were collectively identified as a "heroic brotherhood," and the earliest post-epidemic image was a composite photograph of them depicted together. They are commemorated together in stained glass windows in the west nave of Holy Trinity Church in Shreveport.

== Documentary ==
A full-length documentary titled The Five Priests won multiple awards at international film festivals including the Cannes World Film Festival in 2024.
