= Jaypee Institute of Information Technology =

Deemed University in Uttar Pradesh, India

- Motto in English: Education, Enlightenment, Empowerment
- Type: Public
- Established: 2001; 25 years ago
- Accreditation: UGC, AICTE
- Academic affiliations: AIU
- Chancellor: Manoj Gaur
- Vice-Chancellor: [Late] Dr. Bodh Raj Mehta
- Academic staff: 242+
- Location: Noida, Uttar Pradesh, India; 28°37′47.3″N 77°2′20.2″E
- Campus: 46.94 acres; Urban
- Colours: Blue & navy blue
- Website: www.jiit.ac.in

Jaypee Institute of Information Technology (JIIT) is a private deemed-to-be-university, situated in Noida, Gautam Buddha Nagar district, Uttar Pradesh, India.

== History ==
The institute was founded in 2001 by Jaypee Group and commenced its operation in the start of academic year in July 2001. Initially it was affiliated to the state university Jaypee University of Information Technology, Waknaghat and started offering only diploma courses. By 1 November 2004, it was declared as a Deemed University by UGC.

JIIT, Noida is located in the corporate and housing hub at Sector-62. The Sector-128 campus is an extension to the main campus. It commenced operations from the start of the academic session in August 2009.

=== Chancellor and academic head ===
Jaiprakash Gaur was the founder chairman and chancellor of the institute followed by his son Manoj Gaur, who served as the 2nd chancellor of the institute. He was succeeded by Dr. Yajulu Medury, who is serving as the current chancellor of the institute. Dr. J. P. Gupta was the institute founder director and first vice-chancellor. He was followed by Dr. S. C. Saxena and he is serving as the current vice-chancellor (acting) from 1 July 2011, onward. Dr. Shankar Lall Maskara was the first Dean of Academic & Research of Sector-62 campus; he was followed by Dr. Krishna Gopal.

== Campus ==
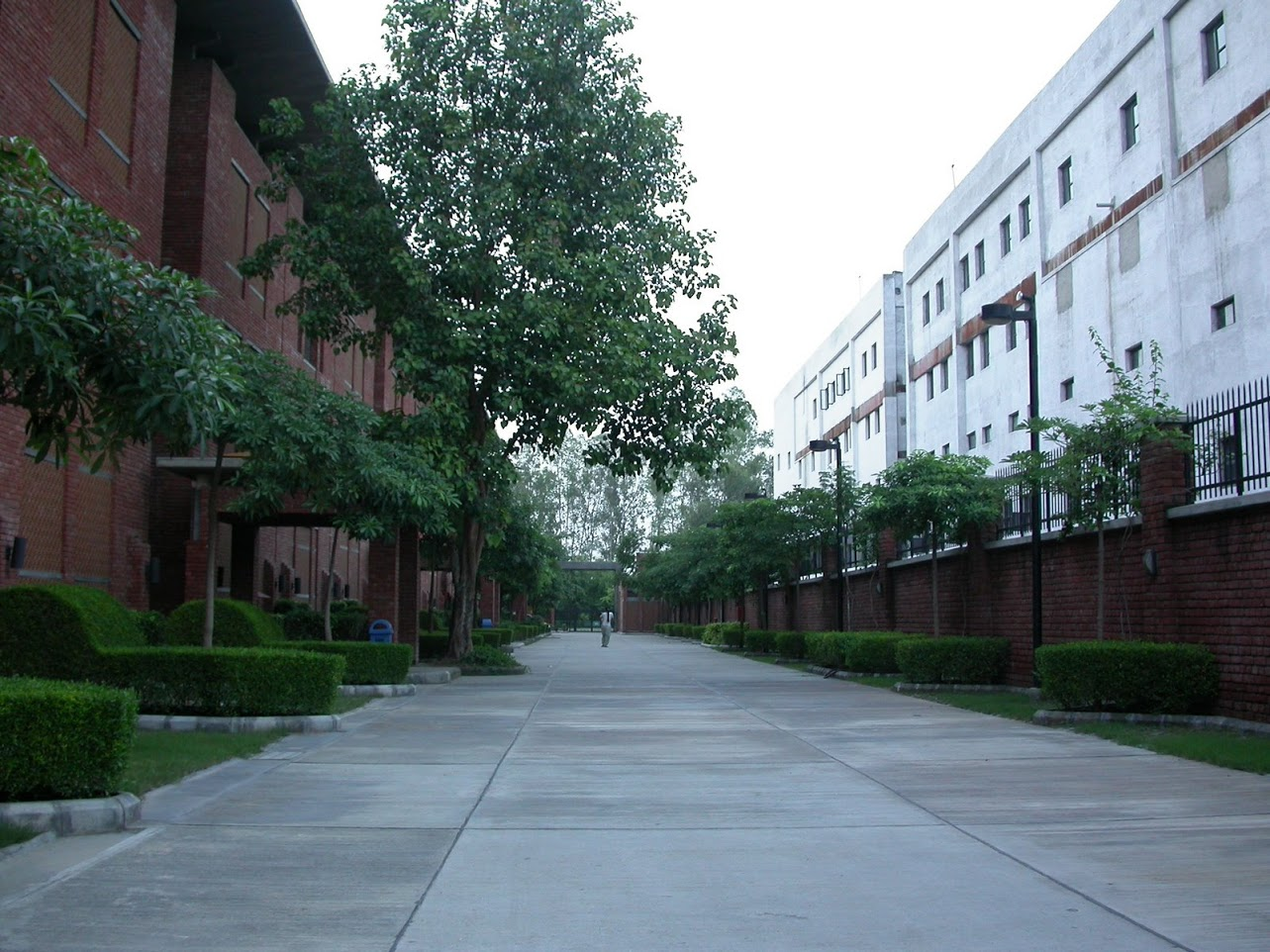
ABB-I towards Gate No - 2

The institute has two campuses in Noida, the main campus located in Sector-62, and the other located in Sector-128.

== Academics ==
Institute offers undergraduate programs leading to a Bachelor of Technology degree and postgraduate program leading to a Master of Technology degree. A five-year dual degree program and doctorate research programs are also offered. The institute also offers BBA & MBA programs under its constituent Jaypee Business School(JBS) which offers specialization in various major and minor subjects like digital marketing, business analytics etc.

All undergraduate and postgraduate programs of the institute have been accredited by the National Board of Accreditation of AICTE.

== Controversies ==
In 2010, the Government of India decided to derecognise 44 universities including JIIT. However, this matter is still pending. In its recent judgement the Supreme Court of India directed the University Grants Commission to conduct a fresh physical verification of infrastructure and faculty strength of deemed universities, which were black-listed by the Tandon Committee. However, in early 2017, JIIT regained its deemed university status. JIIT received approval by AICTE in 2018.

== Rankings ==
University and College rankings

Engineering – India
- NIRF (2023): 101-150

The university was ranked in the 101-150 band in India by the NIRF in the engineering ranking in 2023.

== Notable alumni ==
=== Entertainment ===
- Kriti Sanon, actress, model
- Sakshi Malik (actress), Indian actress

== See also ==
- Jaypee University of Information Technology
- Jaypee University of Engineering & Technology
