= Jatiya Party =

Jatiya Party is the name of four political parties in Bangladesh:

- Jatiya Party (Ershad)
- Jatiya Party (Manju)
- Jatiya Party (Zafar)
- Bangladesh Jatiya Party, previously known as the Jatiya Party (Naziur)

== See also ==
- Jatiya League, political party in Bangladesh
