= Jaypee University of Information Technology =

Private university in Solan, Himachal Pradesh

Coordinates: 31°0′59″N 77°4′13″E

- Jaypee Sūcnā Praudyogikī Viśvavidyālay
- Motto: विद्या तत्त्व ज्योतिस्मः (Sanskrit)
- Type: Private university
- Established: May 2002; 24 years ago
- Founders: Jaiprakash Gaur
- Accreditation: NAAC; NBA
- Affiliations: AIU; AICTE; UGC
- Chairperson: Manoj Gaur
- Chancellor: Governor of Himachal Pradesh
- Vice-Chancellor: Dr. Rajendra Kumar Sharma
- Academic staff: 150
- Undergraduates: 2000
- Postgraduates: 100
- Location: Solan, Himachal Pradesh
- Campus: 25 acres; Suburban
- Newsletter: Hilly Ramblings
- Colours: Navy blue and Sky blue;
- Website: www.juit.ac.in

Jaypee University of Information Technology (JUIT) is a private university in Solan, Himachal Pradesh. Established in 2002, Jaypee University of Information Technology is one of the four universities established by the Jaypee Group.

== History ==
Jaypee University of Information Technology was conceived by a joint vision of the Government of Himachal Pradesh and Jaiprakash Gaur, founder of Jaypee Group, in the year 2000. Government of Himachal Pradesh provided land on lease for the establishment of the university. It was set up by Act No. 14 of 2002 vide Extraordinary Gazette notification of Government of Himachal Pradesh dated 23 May 2002. JUIT was approved by the University Grants Commission under section 2(f) of the UGC Act, the university commenced academic activities from July 2002.

== Location ==
The university is located 3 kilometers off National Highway 22 (22 km from Shimla) (from Waknaghat) which runs from Kalka to Shimla (India).

The campus is spread over 25 acres (100,000 m^{2}) on the green slopes of Waknaghat.

The nearest railway station is Kaithleeghat, 4 kilometers from Waknaghat and the nearest airport is Shimla.

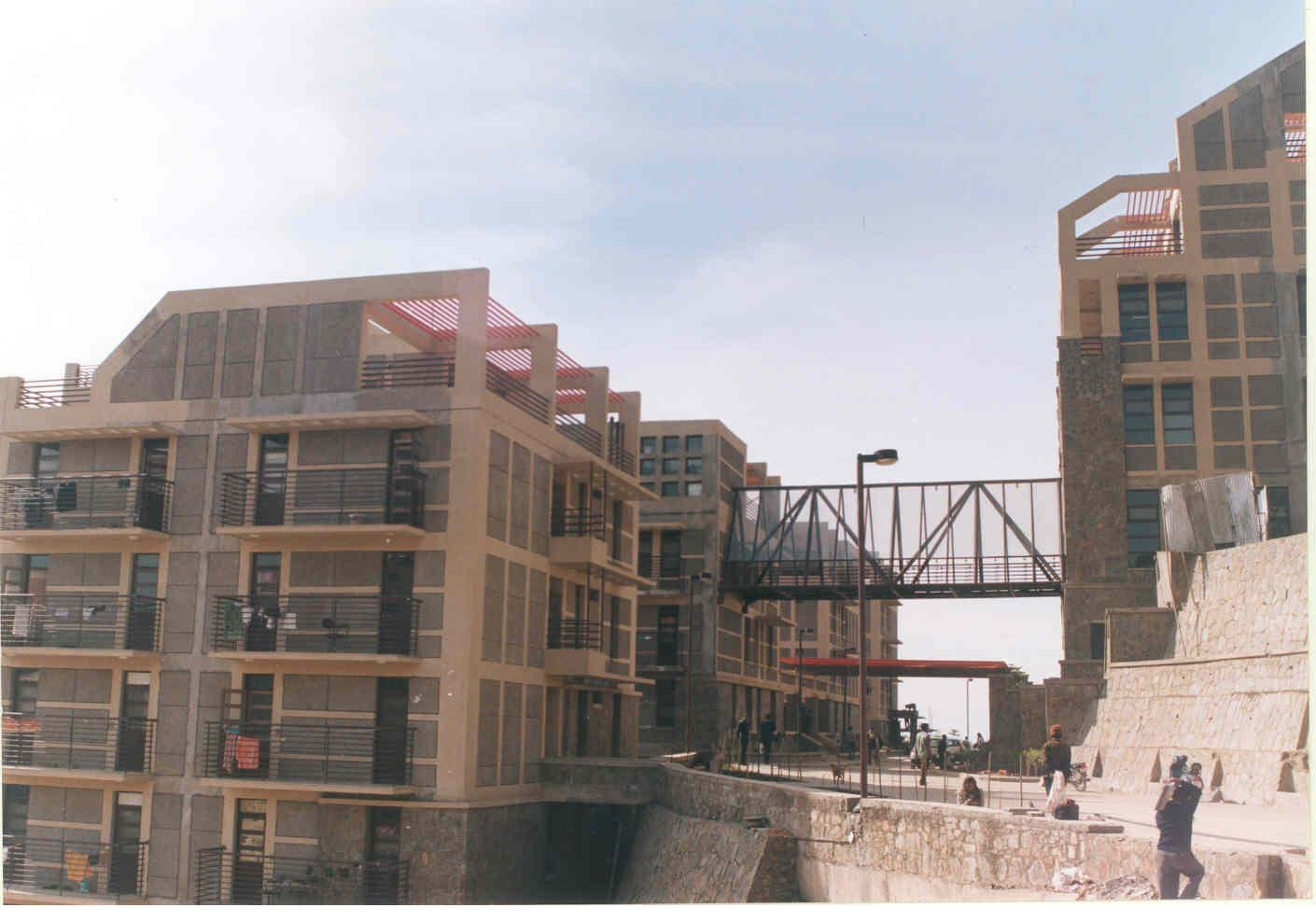
Academic Block, JUIT

== Academics ==
The university offers Bachelor of Technology programmes in various fields. It also offers Bachelor of Pharmacy and Master of Pharmacy as well as various doctoral programmes. In addition to the above-mentioned programs, a dual degree program is offered, wherein a student spends four years at JUIT attending aforementioned programs and one year of the MBA program at the Jaypee Business School, Jaypee Institute of Information Technology.

=== Rankings ===
College rankings

Engineering – India
- NIRF (2024): 201-300

Jaypee University of Information Technology was ranked in 201-300 band among engineering colleges by the National Institutional Ranking Framework (NIRF) in 2024.

== Departments ==
The university includes the following departments:

- Department of Computer Science Engineering and IT
- Department of Electronics and Communication Technology
- Department of Civil Engineering
- Department of Biotechnology and Bioinformatics
- Department of Physics and Material Sciences
- Department of Mathematics

=== Department of Pharmacy ===
The JUIT Department of Pharmacy was approved by the Pharmacy Council of India (PCI) for BPharma from 2008.

== People ==
=== Faculty and staff ===
==== Head of Department ====
A few distinguished members of the faculty have held the title of Head of Department in recognition of their dedication to their respective departments.

Name	Department	Year	Highest Qualification	Notes
P.B. Barman	Physics & Materials Science	2005	Doctor of Philosophy	
Rakesh Kumar Bajaj	Mathematics	2003	Doctor of Philosophy	
Amit Srivastava	Humanities and Social Sciences	2003	Doctor of Philosophy	

== Gallery ==
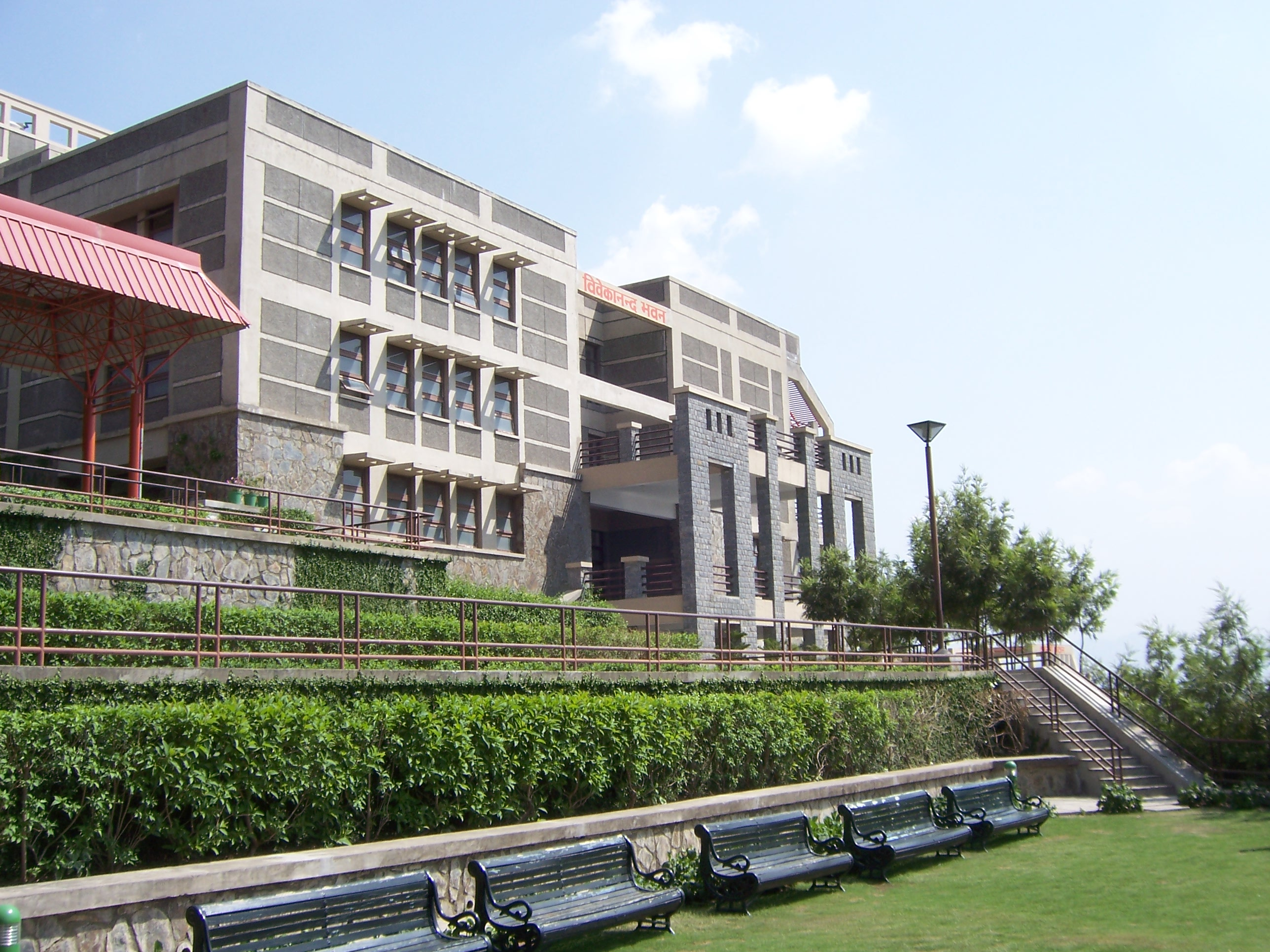
The Mughals

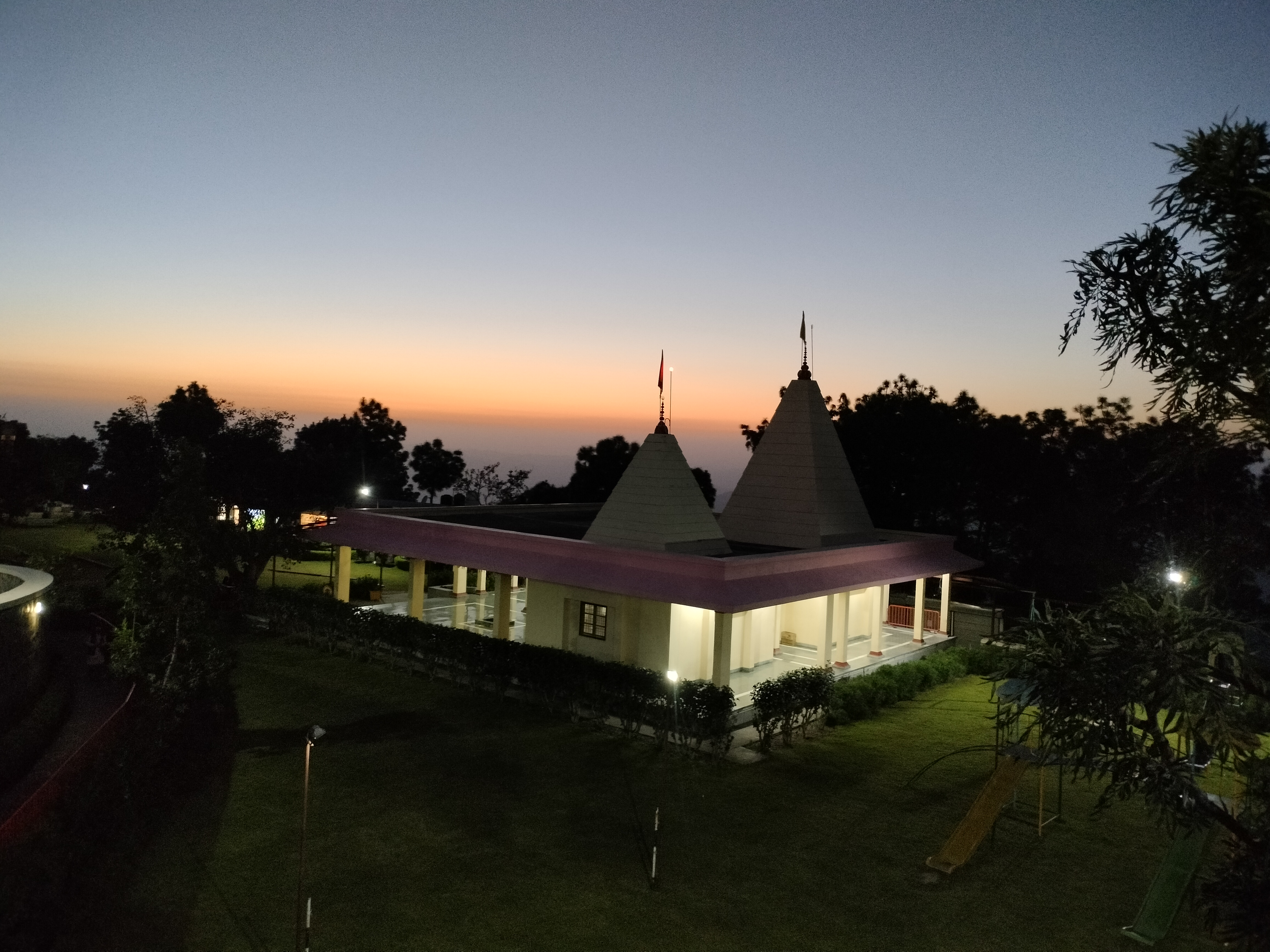
The Temple

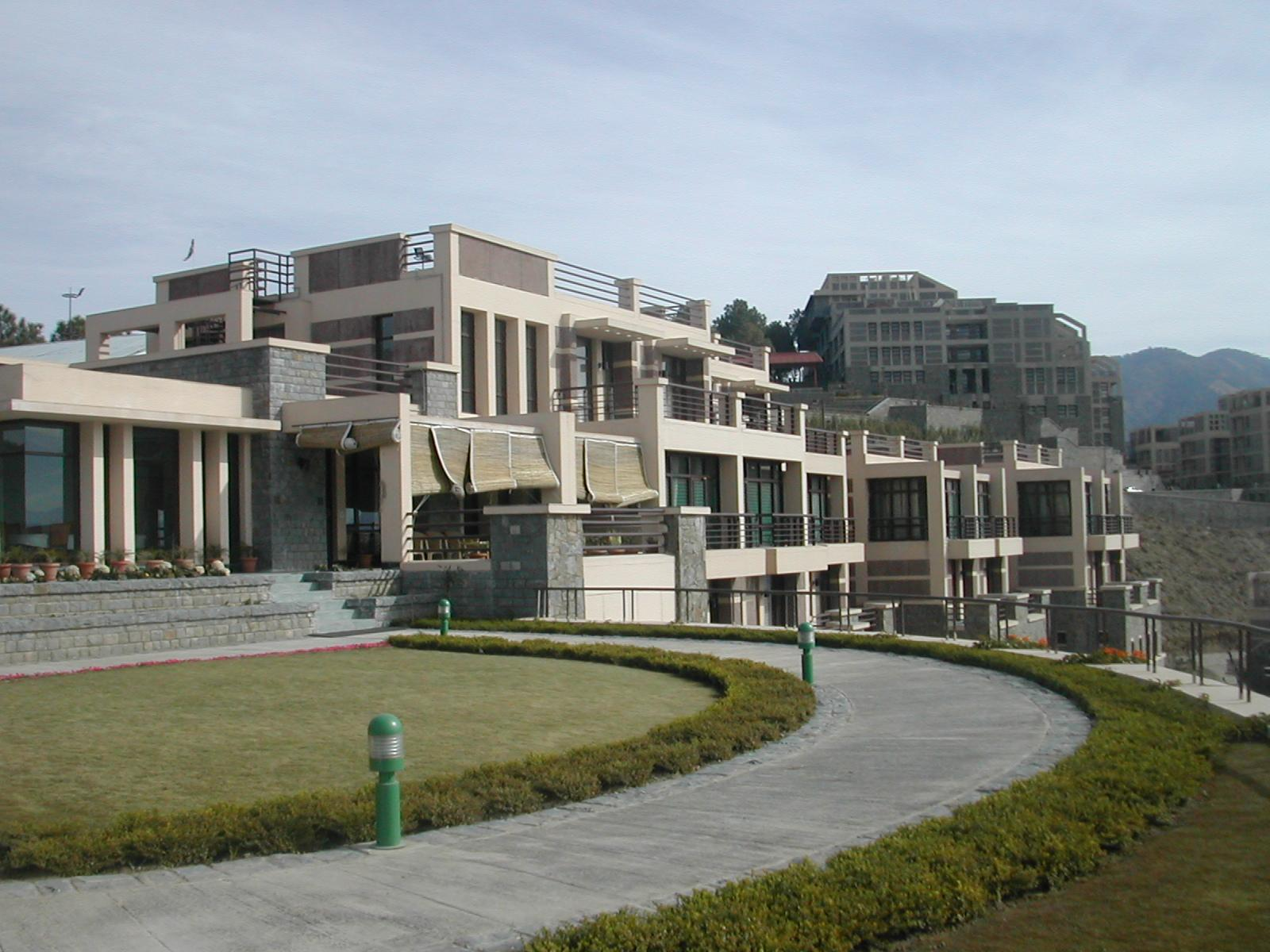
Vasant Bhawan

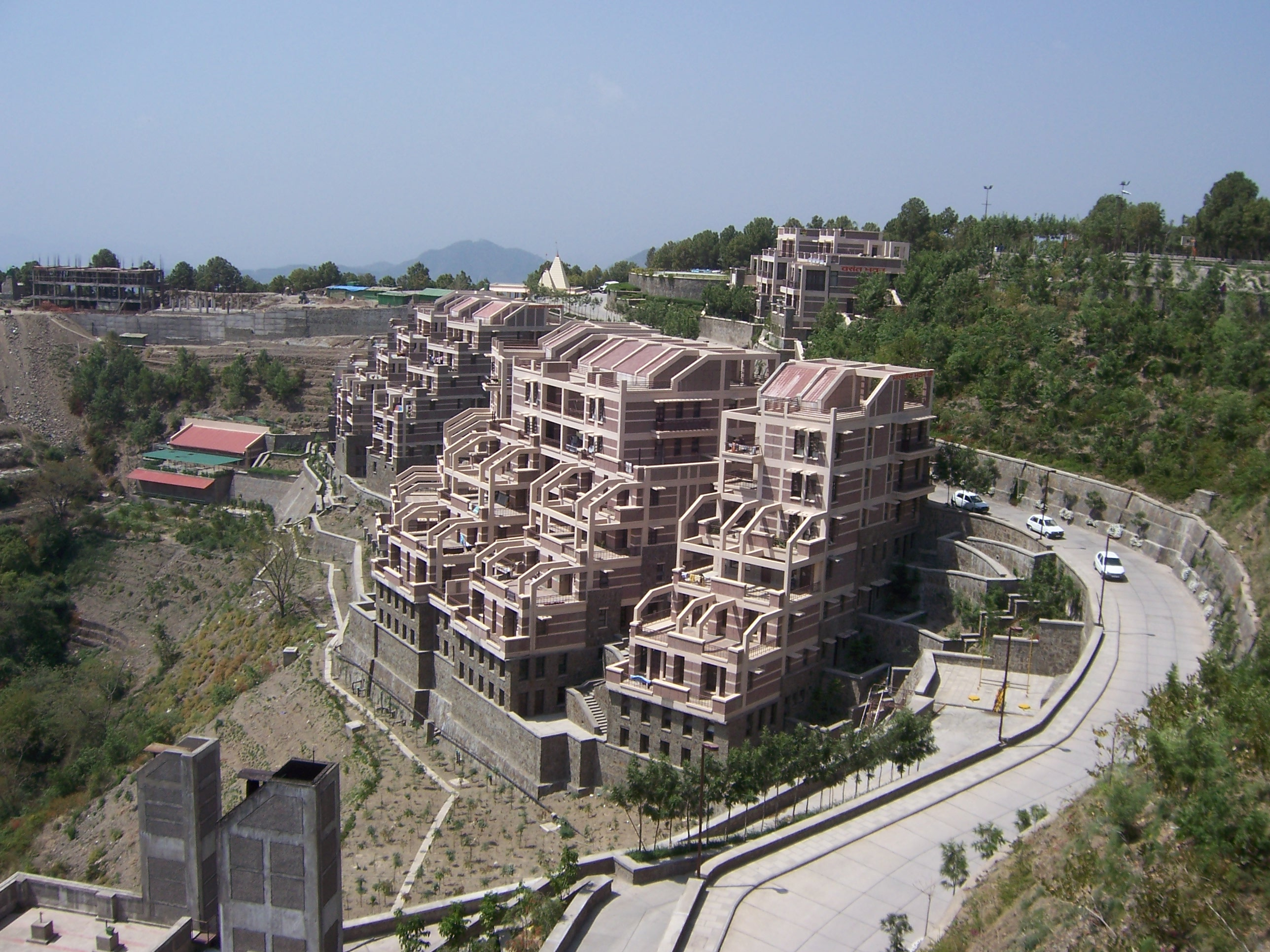
Faculty Housing

== See also ==
- Jaypee University of Engineering and Technology.
- Jaypee institute of information technology.
