= Jaypee University, Anoopshahr =

Private university in Uttar Pradesh

Jaypee University
- Motto: विद्या तत्व ज्योतिसमः
- Type: Private
- Established: 2014
- Vice-Chancellor: Prof Rajiv Saxena ji
- Location: Anoopshahr, Bulandshahr, Uttar Pradesh, India
- Website: Official website

Jaypee University is a private university located in Anoopshahr, Bulandshahr in Uttar Pradesh.It is part of the Jaypee Group.It has been established under UP act no 8 of 2014.
