= Jean-Pierre =

Jean-Pierre or Jean Pierre may refer to:

== People ==
- Karine Jean-Pierre b.1974, White House Deputy Press Secretary 2021-2022, White House Press Secretary 2022-2025 under Joe Biden
- Jean-Pierre, Count of Montalivet (1766–1823), French statesman and Peer of France
- Jean Pierre (netball) (1944–2002), Trinidad and Tobago netball player, coach and politician

== Places ==
- Jean-Pierre Bay, on the Gouin Reservoir in Quebec, Canada

== Arts and entertainment ==
- "Jean Pierre", song by Miles Davis from Miles! Miles! Miles!
- Jean-Pierre, chef on television series Metalocalypse
- Jean-Pierre Delmas, in French animated television series Code Lyoko
- Jean Pierre, a character in Fighter's History
- Jean Pierre Polnareff, a character from JoJo's Bizarre Adventure
