= Tere Ishk Mein =

2025 Indian film by Aanand L. Rai

- Theatrical release poster
- Directed by: Aanand L. Rai
- Written by: Himanshu Sharma; Neeraj Yadav
- Produced by: Aanand L. Rai; Himanshu Sharma; Bhushan Kumar; Krishan Kumar
- Starring: Dhanush Kriti Sanon
- Cinematography: Tushar Kanti Ray
- Edited by: Hemal Kothari
- Music by: A. R. Rahman
- Production companies: Colour Yellow Productions; T-Series Films
- Distributed by: AA Films
- Release date: 28 November 2025
- Running time: 169 minutes
- Country: India
- Language: Hindi
- Budget: est. ₹85 crore
- Box office: est. ₹148.5 crore

Tere Ishk Mein (transl. 'In your love') is a 2025 Indian Hindi-language romantic drama film directed by Aanand L. Rai from a screenplay written by Himanshu Sharma and Neeraj Yadav. Billed as a spiritual sequel to Raanjhanaa (2013), the film stars Dhanush and Kriti Sanon. It follows Shankar, who develops a relationship with Mukti while she conducts her PhD research on him. After she ends the relationship and moves on, Shankar joins the Indian Air Force, and years later their unresolved past resurfaces when they meet again.

Produced by Colour Yellow Productions and T-Series Films, the film was officially announced in June 2023, coinciding with the 10th anniversary of Raanjhanaa. Principal photography took place from October 2024 to July 2025, with filming taking place in Delhi, Varanasi, Leh, and Mumbai. The film has music composed by A. R. Rahman, cinematography handled by Tushar Kanti Ray and editing by Hemal Kothari.

Tere Ishk Mein was released on 28 November 2025 in theatres. It was also screened at the Gala Premiere section at the 56th International Film Festival of India (IFFI) in Goa on the same date. The film received mixed reviews from critics, with praise for Dhanush and Sanon's performances and the music, but criticism for the story and screenplay. It was a commercial success, grossing ₹148.5 crore (US$15 million) worldwide.

== Plot ==
Indian Air Force Flight Lieutenant Shankar Gurukkal flies his fighter jet when he suspects a Chinese aircraft entering Indian territory with hostile intent. Instead of following protocol, Shankar aggressively intimidates the plane and forces it to turn back. His senior, Group Captain Shekhawat, is shocked by this behaviour and grounds him until he clears a psychological evaluation.

The case is sent to Mukti Beniwal, a military psychologist. Mukti is heavily pregnant and is battling alcoholism. When she sees Shankar's name in the file, she is shaken and asks to personally handle his evaluation. She travels to the Air Force base in Leh to meet him. Their meeting brings back memories from seven years ago.

Back then, Shankar was a hot-headed student and president of the Delhi University Students Union. Mukti was a calm and brilliant psychology research scholar. She believed aggressive behaviour could be changed, and chose Shankar as the subject of her PhD research. Over time, Shankar fell in love with her, but Mukti did not return his feelings. She was afraid of his emotional intensity and anger.

Unable to reject him directly, Mukti arranged for her father to set a condition for marriage — that Shankar must clear the UPSC exam. Over the course of three years, while Shankar prepared seriously for the exam, Mukti went to the United States. Just when Shankar cleared the UPSC prelims, Mukti announced her marriage to Jasjeet, a man she had met in the US. In rage and heartbreak, Shankar burned her house with Molotov cocktails. Mukti's father gets Shankar arrested for this, forcing Shankar's father, Raghav Gurukkal to apologise and beg on his behalf to get him out of jail. While Shankar and Raghav were returning home they meet with an accident in which Raghav dies. Shankar goes to Benaras to perform his last rites where he meets Murari who tells Shankar that he should transform his pain into something more powerful. Shankar turns his attention to his father Raghav's dream of becoming a pilot and joins the Indian Air Force.

A heartbroken Shankar goes to Mukti's wedding ceremony and pours the holy water from Banaras on her head. He tells her that he had prayed she gives birth to a son who loves like Shankar. Mukti and Jasjeet's wedding is called off when Jasjeet unties the wedding knot in the altar. Mukti becomes restless and desperate when she finds Shankar's home abandoned, and soon becomes an alcoholic, which later leads to her becoming sick from liver cirrhosis. After her diagnosis, Mukti's father pushes her to marry Jasjeet in a civil court.

In the present, Jasjeet is an officer in the Indian Navy, and Mukti is the head counsellor of the military. Shankar wants Mukti to clear his psychological evaluation so he can return to combat. Mukti refuses at first, knowing she is dying from her liver cirrhosis and reveals to Shankar that she had fulfilled his prayers of giving birth to a son and that he must now take care of her baby once she is gone. Shankar promises that the baby will not grow up an orphan, and she signs his papers.

Shankar returns to duty. When a Chinese ship attacks the Indian naval vessel carrying Jasjeet, Shankar refuses to eject and crashes his jet into the enemy ship, saving Jasjeet and the fleet. Mukti dies during childbirth, weakened by her illness.

== Cast ==
- Dhanush as Flt Lt Shankar Gurukkal
- Kriti Sanon as Mukti Beniwal
- Prakash Raj as Raghav Gurukkal, Shankar's father
- Priyanshu Painyuli as Ved
- Tota Roy Chowdhury as Yashwant Beniwal, Mukti's father
- Paramvir Singh Cheema as Jasjeet Shergill, Navy officer at (INS) Vijay
- Chittaranjan Tripathy as Prof. Mathur
- Jaya Bhattacharya as a Prof. Shabnum
- Vineet Kumar Singh as Group Captain V. Shekhawat
- Mohammed Zeeshan Ayyub as Murari Gupta
- Sushil Dahiya as Inspector
- Maahir Mohiuddin as Rana

== Production ==
=== Development and casting ===
Rai revealed the idea of making Tere Ishk Mein was to put forward the sensibilities of Raanjhanaa keeping the Gen Z audience in mind. The film marks the third collaboration between Rai and Dhanush. (Note: After Raanjhanaa (2013) and Atrangi Re (2021)) Rai cast Dhanush once again because the actor falls within his creative "comfort zone". Kriti Sanon was cast as the female lead, replacing Sonam Kapoor in January 2025. The film was written by Rai's frequent collaborator Sharma, who had also written Raanjhanaa, and Neeraj Yadav, who made his writing debut with Rai's and Sharma's production of the 2022 film An Action Hero. The film was described as a spiritual sequel to Raanjhanaa. Dhanush and Sanon were officially confirmed as the lead cast. Tere Ishk Mein was first announced in June 2023 but did not begin filming until October 2024 due to Dhanush's scheduling conflicts except for a promo shoot.

=== Filming ===
Principal photography began in October 2024, following the release of a promotional video that had been shot in June 2023 to mark the 10th anniversary of Raanjhanaa. The film was shot in Delhi and Benaras with Kriti Sanon joining the schedule in February 2025. Filming was completed in July 2025. Some scenes were shot at the Shri Ram College of Commerce. In April 2025, the Leh schedule of the film was completed. The final leg of shooting was completed in Mumbai. The climax scene was shot over a week, it left the actress Kriti Sanon emotionally drained.

== Soundtrack ==
The film's soundtrack was composed by A. R. Rahman with lyrics written by Irshad Kamil. The audio rights were acquired by T-Series. The film's title track "Tere Ishk Mein" was released on 18 October 2025. The second song "Usey Kehna" was released on 2 November 2025. The Tamil version of the film's title track "O Kadhale" was sung by Aditya RK, with the lyrics written by Mashook Rahman the song was released on 29 October 2025.

== Marketing ==
An initial teaser was released on YouTube on 27 January 2025. A full teaser was released on 1 October 2025. The latter was screened with Kantara: Chapter 1 and Sunny Sanskari Ki Tulsi Kumari as part of the producers’ strategy to capitalize on the Dusshera and Diwali theatrical periods. As a promotional event, the complete soundtrack album was launched at an event in Mumbai attended by the film's cast and crew. The official trailer was released on 14 November 2025.

The official trailer received coverage from several media outlets. The Times of India noted its focus on themes of grief and unfulfilled desire. Hindustan Times noted the strong audience response and compared the narrative intensity to Raanjhanaa. NDTV also reviewed the trailer, commenting on the dramatic stakes and visual boldness.

== Release ==
The film was released on 28 November 2025 worldwide in Hindi, Tamil and Telugu languages. The film was also screened at the Gala Premiere section at the 56th International Film Festival of India (IFFI) in Goa on the same date. and released under same title in Tamil. The film was distributed by T-Series Films all over India. The film received an U/A certificate from CBFC on 24 November 2025 without any cuts. The film was distributed by AA Films nationally. The distributors asked single-screen theatres to agree to allot 4 shows in the opening week and 2 shows next week. The film released in over 5100 screens across India in Hindi, Tamil and Telugu.

=== Pre-release business ===
As of 27 November 2025 the film made nearly ₹5.5 crore from advance booking that started on 24 November 2025. The film registered maximum advance booking in multiplex chains of Cinepolis and PVR INOX.

=== Home media ===
The film began streaming on Netflix on 23 January 2026.

== Copyright lawsuit ==
Eros International accusing Aanand L Rai and his production banner, Colour Yellow Productions of unlawful leveraging of the intellectual property of Raanjhanaa, said that he while promoting the film Tere Ishk Mein, presented the film as a spiritual successor of Raanjhanaa. Eros filled a case of ₹84 crore against the director and his production house in Bombay High Court accusing the film makers of suggesting a connection between the two films. T-Series Films has also been made party to the lawsuit. Eros said in lawsuit, it holds the copyright, registered trademark, characters, dialogues, and sequel or remake rights of Raanjhanaa. The director has however downplayed the lawsuit.

== Reception ==
=== Box office ===
In India, Tere Ishk Mein opened to ₹17.93 crore (US$1.9 million) on its opening day, with an additional ₹1.34 crore (US$140,000) from overseas markets. The worldwide collection total as of Wednesday stood at approximately ₹94.78 crore (US$9.8 million).

Tere Ishk Mein equalled a lifetime domestic box-office total of its spiritual predecessor, Raanjhanaa after four days, which had collected approximately ₹60.25 crore in India.

As of 29 December 2025, Tere Ishk Mein has grossed ₹134.2 crore (US$14 million) domestically and ₹14.3 crore (US$1.5 million) overseas for a worldwide gross of ₹148.5 crore (US$15 million).

In Malaysia, the film opened at ninth place at the box office ahead of Indonesian movie Klepet, with the majority of its earnings attributed to the Tamil-language version of the film.

=== Critical reception ===
On the review aggregator website Rotten Tomatoes, 29% of 14 critics' reviews are positive, with an average rating of 4/10.

Kiran Jain of Amar Ujala gave 3/5 stars and wrote "Overall, the film is must watch, especially for those who like to watch 'love stories".

Bollywood Hungama gave 3/5 stars and wrote "an intense love saga" supported by memorable dramatic moments and strong performances by the lead actors, though it critiqued the "overlong runtime and a weak second half" as factors that "severely curb its impact".

Rishabh Suri of Hindustan Times gave 3/5 stars and wrote "A turbulent, uneven romance by Aanand L Rai, elevated by Dhanush, Kriti Sanon's powerful act".

Sana Farzeen of India Today gave 2.5/5 stars and wrote "Tere Ishq Mein attempts to portray a complex story of toxic love and obsession. Despite powerful performances, the film's problematic narrative leaves audiences unsettled and triggered".

Yatamanyu Narain of News18 gave 2.5/5 stars and wrote "Dhanush, Kriti Sanon Film Is An Angry Love Letter Written In Blood, Sprinkled With Petrol"

Dhaval Roy of The Times of India gave 2.5/5 stars and wrote "Dhanush and Kriti Sanon shine in this intense but inconsistent love drama".

Aavishkar Gawande, popular film critic and trade analyst gave 2/5 stars and wrote “It is flawed, immature and deeply problematic”. However he praised the performances of the leads.

Saibal Chatterjee of NDTV gave 2/5 stars and wrote "It is a love story that is an advertisement that love can do without".

Lachmi Deb Roy of Firstpost gave 2/5 stars and wrote "Aanand L Rai should have understood that films that work for Tamil audiences may not work nationally. Toxic masculinity or misogyny is a very accepted fact in South films and even in some Bollywood films, but that doesn’t really work for today’s evolved, educated and cultured audience!".

Shubhra Gupta of The Indian Express gave 1/5 and wrote "Dhanush, Kriti Sanon star in a film which ends up being a confused, heavy-on-melodrama-and-glycerine mish-mash of genres that glorifies an 'aggressive, angry, alpha’ man".
