= Jamestown Public Schools =

Jamestown Public Schools may refer to:

- Jamestown Public Schools (New York)
- Jamestown Public Schools (North Dakota)
