= Jaiprakash Gaur =

Indian entrepreneur (born c. 1930)

- Born: 1 January 1931 (age 95)
- Education: University of Roorkee (1950)
- Relatives: Manoj Gaur, Rita Dixit, Sameer Gaur

Jaiprakash Gaur (born c.1930) is an Indian entrepreneur. He founded and, until his retirement in 2010, was the chairman of Jaypee Group, a conglomerate with a heavy emphasis on engineering and construction (particularly for infrastructure and power projects), cement, and hydropower production. In 2012 he was ranked by Forbes magazine as the 70th-richest person in India, with an estimated net worth of US$855 million. Gaur has been associated with the construction industry for more than five decades.

== Early life ==
Gaur was born in a Gaur Brahmin family of the village Chitta near Bulandshahr in present Uttar Pradesh. His father was an agricultural inspector in the British government and worked as a serviceman in Beej Godam, Pakki Sarai at Anupshahr. He completed his secondary education at LDAV Inter College, Anupshahr. After graduating as a civil engineer from the University of Roorkee (now IIT Roorkee), he worked as a junior engineer in the Uttar Pradesh State Irrigation Department.

== Career ==
After graduation, Gaur joined the state government's irrigation department as a junior engineer. Subsequently he started his own venture as a civil contractor. Two decades later, he laid the foundation for the Jaypee Group by setting up Jaiprakash Associates, a civil engineering and construction company. To leave a secure government job and pursue contractorship in 1958, when it was considered to be most prestigious, required courage. In 1967, he led and transformed a motley group of persons into a company which took pride in its cable address "Iron Will" and went on to execute:

- Sardar Sarovar Dam – India’s largest dam with 7.2 million cu.m. of chilled concrete; larger by 75% in terms of volume than Bhakra Nangal Dam
- Tehri Dam - Asia's largest rockfill dam
- Nathpa Jhakri (powerhouse) - The largest underground powerhouse in India

In 2010 he was ranked by Forbes magazine as the 48th-richest person in India, with an estimated wealth of US$1.5 billion.

== Awards and honours ==
- 2005 "Distinguished Alumni Award" by Indian Institute of Technology Roorkee (erstwhile University of Roorkee), in recognition of his contribution in the field of corporate development/administration/entrepreneurship
- 2005 "Lifetime Achievement Award" by Builders' Association of India, in recognition of his outstanding contribution to the Indian construction industry
- 2005 "Udyog Ratna" award by the Progress Harmony Development (PHD) Chamber of Commerce & Industry, in recognition of his contribution to the economic development of Madhya Pradesh
- 2008 "Entrepreneur of Year Award", by Ernst & Young, for his exceptional contribution to the infrastructure and construction sector
- 2010 "Lifetime Achievement Award" by Merchants' Chamber of Uttar Pradesh, Kanpur, for creating new milestones in infrastructure development and for his achievement in corporate social responsibility
