= Do Patti =

2024 Indian film by Shashanka Chaturvedi

- Release poster
- Directed by: Shashanka Chaturvedi
- Written by: Kanika Dhillon
- Produced by: Kanika Dhillon; Kriti Sanon
- Starring: Kajol Devgan; Kriti Sanon; Shaheer Sheikh
- Cinematography: Mart Ratassepp
- Edited by: Naman Arora; Hemal Kothari
- Music by: Score: Anurag Saikia; Songs: Sachet–Parampara; Tanishk Bagchi
- Production companies: Kathha Pictures; Blue Butterfly Films
- Distributed by: Netflix
- Release date: 25 October 2024
- Running time: 127 minutes
- Country: India
- Language: Hindi

Do Patti (transl. Two Cards) is a 2024 Indian Hindi-language mystery thriller film directed by debutante Shashanka Chaturvedi and written by Kanika Dhillon, who makes her production debut under her venture Kathha Pictures alongside actress Kriti Sanon in her production debut under her venture Blue Butterfly Films. Apart from Kriti Sanon, the film stars Kajol Devgan, and marks the Hindi film debut of Shaheer Sheikh, with Tanvi Azmi playing a supporting role. The story follows a police officer's troubled ordeals with a couple wherein the wife, who has a jealous twin sister, accuses the husband of attempting to murder her, leading to the rivalry between the twins also coming under scrutiny.

Do Patti was released on Netflix on 25 October 2024 to mixed reviews from critics with praise towards the performances of all leads. The film went on to become the most-watched Netflix India Original of the year, and made it to Variety's Top Ten list of Most Watched Streaming Originals in the world.

The film was nominated for several awards under the categories including Best Film, Best Story, and Best Actor. Dhillon went on to win the IIFA 2025 Digital Award for ‘Best Story’ for Do Patti.

== Plot ==
The film opens with Saumya and Dhruv at Devipur village police station in Uttarakhand, where Saumya accuses Dhruv of attempting to kill her. The story flashes back to an earlier incident when police officer Vidya Jyothi (VJ) receives a call regarding domestic abuse but finds it dismissed as a false alarm. However, Maaji, a maternal figure to Saumya, privately reveals that she had placed the call out of concern, explaining that Saumya gets brutally abused by her husband, Dhruv, though Saumya decides to remain silent about it.

Through Maaji's account, we learn that Dhruv, the son of a minister and owner of a paragliding company in Devipur, met Saumya, who developed feelings for him. When Saumya introduces him to her family, her identical twin sister, Shailee, becomes infatuated with Dhruv. Having been the focus of care due to numerous phobias and mental health issues since their mother's death, Saumya has always been prioritised, which now fuels Shailee's resentment. Dhruv and Shailee start dating, but due to Shailee's unpredictable and bold behaviour, Dhruv starts having second thoughts, and a business deal gone wrong causes his father to pressurise him, get a hold of himself and find a homely spouse. Consequently, Dhruv marries Saumya, though Shailee continues to pursue him, causing conflict.

VJ learns of the sisters' rivalry and Dhruv's violent behaviour. Maaji recounts that whenever Saumya suggests having a child, Dhruv's temper flares, often leading to physical abuse. In one incident, he pushes her down the stairs, leaving her half-dead. Determined to bring Dhruv to justice, VJ confronts him, but Dhruv insists her fall was accidental, a claim Saumya initially supports, stating her intent to start afresh with him and not wanting to lose to Shailee.

At home, Saumya proposes a paragliding trip, hoping Dhruv will recreate his initial proposal. Maaji, meanwhile, works to gather evidence against Dhruv, who dismisses her warnings to mend his ways. During a Holi celebration, Shailee and Dhruv share a moment, prompting Saumya to lead Dhruv on a paragliding outing. Mid-flight, Dhruv's harness fails, but both narrowly escape. Dhruv is arrested based on Saumya's accusation of attempted murder: she claims that Dhruv loosened her harness to push her out. With compelling evidence, he is convicted of attempted murder and domestic violence and sentenced to prison.

VJ senses inconsistencies in the case's details. She realises that Saumya and Shailee orchestrated a deception: they had swapped roles before the paragliding, with Shailee sabotaging the harness mid-flight and then joining Saumya to accuse Dhruv. When VJ confronts them, Shailee argues that their actions were justified, revealing the family's history of concealed domestic abuse. She admits that remaining silent about their mother's suffering was wrong, while VJ reflects on domestic violence as a social, not merely private, issue. Since punishment for domestic abuse is much less than attempted murder, VJ withdraws her appeal, convinced that not always going by the book delivers justice, and the film concludes as Saumya finds closure.

== Cast ==
- Kriti Sanon in a dual role as
  - Saumya Pundir Sood: Shailee's twin sister; Dhruv's wife; the reserved and simple sister
  - Shailee Pundir: Saumya's twin sister; Dhruv's former girlfriend; the wild and outgoing sister
- Kajol Devgan as Inspector Vidya Jyothi "VJ" Kanwar: the official investigating the case
- Shaheer Sheikh as Dhruv Sood: Saumya's husband; Shailee's former boyfriend
- Tanvi Azmi as Maaji: Saumya and Shailee's caretaker
- Brijendra Kala as Katoch: Vidya's assistant
- Vivek Mushran as Deepak Pundir: Saumya and Shailee's uncle
- Prachee Shah Paandya as Shobhana Pundir: Saumya and Shailee's mother
- Rohit Tiwari as Niren Pundir: Saumya and Shailee's father
- Chittaranjan Tripathy as Kumar: Defence lawyer
- Manoj Bakshi as Tyagi: A politician
- Mohit Chauhan as Prithvi Singh Sood: Dhruv's father
- Prachi Desai as Suzzy Simp
- Sohaila Kapur as Justice Aruna Goel
- Eisha Singh as Aditi Apte
- Vridhi and Vristhi as young Saumya and Shailee
- Darius Chinoy as Justice Anurag Saxena

== Production ==
=== Development ===
The film was officially announced on 5 July 2023 as a Netflix thriller, titled Do Patti and led by Kriti Sanon and Kajol Devgan, in their second film post Dilwale (2015). It also marks Kanika Dhillon's production debut under Kathha Pictures, with Kriti Sanon turning producer as well, under her banner Blue Butterfly Films. In October 2023, television actor Shaheer Sheikh joined the cast.

=== Filming ===
Principal photography commenced in August 2023. Filming took place in Mumbai, Nainital, and Dehradun. The filming wrapped up in December 2023.

== Music ==
Do Patti

Soundtrack album by Sachet-Parampara and Tanishk Bagchi
- Released: 24 October 2024
- Recorded: 2023
- Genre: Feature film soundtrack
- Length: 16:44
- Language: Hindi
- Label: T-Series
External audio
- Do Patti (Audio Jukebox) on YouTube

The first single titled "Raanjhan" was released on 4 October 2024. The second single titled "Akhiyaan De Kol" was released on 18 October 2024.

The song "Akhiyaan De Kol" was a remake of the song "Ankhiyan Nu Rehan De" by the Pakistani singer Reshma.

Track listing
No.	Title	Lyrics	Music	Singer(s)	Length
1.	"Raanjhan"	Kausar Munir	Sachet–Parampara	Parampara Tandon	4:00
2.	"Akhiyaan De Kol"	Kausar Munir, Mellow D	Tanishk Bagchi	Shilpa Rao, Mellow D	2:52
3.	"Jaadu"	Kausar Munir	Sachet–Parampara	Sachet Tandon	3:26
4.	"Maiyya"	Kausar Munir	Sachet–Parampara	Sachet Tandon, Parampara Tandon	3:42
5.	"Thaaein Thaaein"	Kausar Munir	Sachet–Parampara	Shreya Ghoshal, Sachet Tandon	2:44
Total length:					16:44

== Reception ==
Do Patti received mixed reviews from critics. On the review aggregator website Rotten Tomatoes, 50% of 10 critics' reviews are positive, with an average rating of 5.2/10. It received mixed reviews from audiences.

Sukanya Verma of Rediff.com rated the film 2 out of 5, writing, "Dysfunctionality triggered by scarred childhood is a valid point but doesn't find an active voice in Do Patti's half-baked diabolism, which needed to be more Dead Ringers than The Parent Trap. Shubhra Gupta of The Indian Express gave the film 1.5 out of 5, writing, "There’s enough in Kriti Sanon-Kajol film for a juicy, substantive drama. But the unpacking turns more into an unravelling, mainly because the writing is shallow, and the characters lack depth."

Aakriti Agarwala of The Statesman writes, "Do Patti aimed to connect several social issues of generational trauma, domestic violence, and discourse around patriarchy and its inherent nature via a thriller. Additionally, the film hinged upon the dichotomy between the ‘word of law’ and the ‘spirit of law’ but it lacked the punch to do so. Despite harbouring good intentions, the unidimensional characterisations and a convenient storyline don't leave much scope to weigh on the issues."

It trended on the Netflix Global Top Ten Charts (Non-English) Film in over 30 countries, and stayed on the trending charts for over 50 days. It also broke records by being the only Indian film across all platforms to be on the prestigious Variety's Top Ten list of Most Watched Streaming Originals, on position 9, garnering a whopping 92.4 Million views. It is considered to be one of the most successful films of the year on Netflix. As per Ormax reports, Do Patti was the Number 1 - Most Watched Film and Most Buzzed Film in 2024, across all streaming platforms in India. It also features in the top 10 list of the Most Liked Films of 2024, as per the statistics.
