= Kriti Sanon =

Indian actress (born 1990)

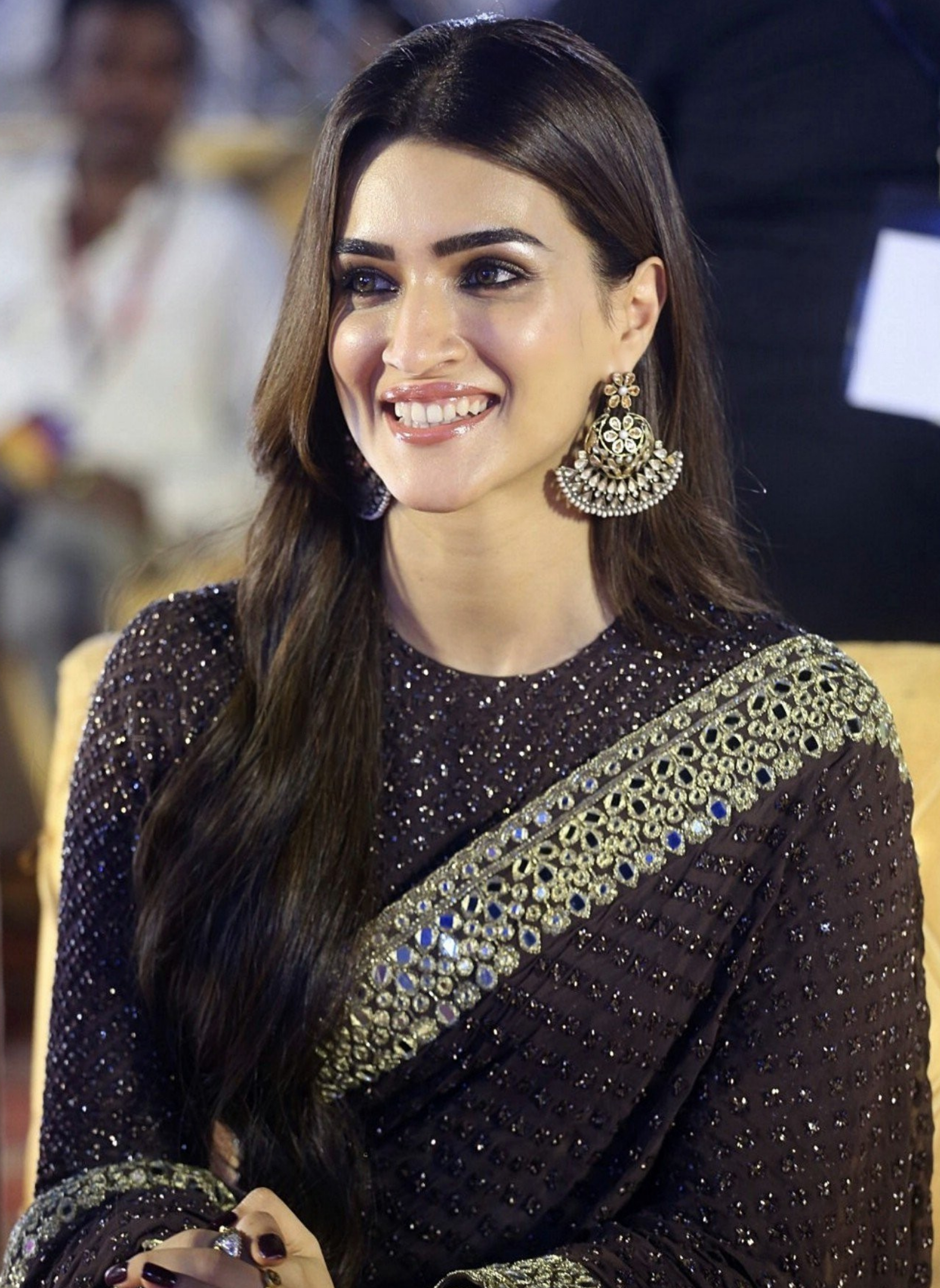
- Sanon in 2023
- Born: 27 July 1990 (age 36); New Delhi, India
- Education: Jaypee Institute of Technology
- Occupation: Actress
- Years active: 2014–present
- Relatives: Nupur Sanon (sister); Stebin Ben (brother-in-law)
- Awards: Full list

Kriti Sanon (/ˈkrɪti ˈsænɒn/ KRIT-ee SAN-on; born 27 July 1990) is an Indian actress who primarily works in Hindi films. She is a recipient of several accolades including a National Film Award and two Filmfare Awards. Sanon was featured in Forbes India's Celebrity 100 list of 2019.

After pursuing a degree in engineering from the Jaypee Institute of Information Technology, Sanon briefly worked as a fashion model. She began her acting career by playing the female lead in the 2014 action films 1: Nenokkadine and Heropanti. The latter earned her the Filmfare Award for Best Female Debut. Her career progressed with starring roles in the commercially successful romantic comedies Bareilly Ki Barfi (2017) and Luka Chuppi (2019), and her highest-grossing releases came with the ensemble comedies Dilwale (2015) and Housefull 4 (2019).

Sanon won the National Film Award and the Filmfare Award for Best Actress for her performance in the title role of a surrogate mother in the comedy-drama Mimi (2021). This was followed by a series of commercially unsuccessful films, including the mythological film Adipurush (2023), with the exception of the horror-comedy Bhediya (2022), in which she had a brief role. She has since achieved commercial successes with the comedies Teri Baaton Mein Aisa Uljha Jiya and Crew (both 2024), and the romantic drama Tere Ishk Mein (2025).

In addition to acting, she is a celebrity endorser for several brands and products. Sanon has launched her clothing line Ms. Taken, fitness company The Tribe, skin-care brand Hyphen, as well as her production company Blue Butterfly Films.

== Early life ==
Sanon was born on 27 July 1990 in New Delhi to Rahul Sanon, a chartered accountant, and Geeta Sanon, a physics professor at the University of Delhi. She comes from a Punjabi Hindu family and has a younger sister, Nupur, who is also an actress.

Sanon began training in Kathak at the age of eight and enrolled in a five-year professional course at the Kathak Kendra, attending classes three times a week. She attended Delhi Public School, R. K. Puram before obtaining a Bachelor of Technology degree in Electronics and Telecommunication Engineering from the Jaypee Institute of Information Technology in Noida.

Before entering the film industry, Sanon briefly worked as a model. While pursuing acting, she also prepared for a Master of Business Administration (MBA) to address her parents' concerns about the uncertainty of an acting career. She took the GMAT, but her score, which was valid for five years, eventually expired after she established herself in the film industry.

== Career ==
=== Early work and recognition (2014–2020) ===
Sanon began pursuing a modelling career during her second year of university. After winning an online 'Fresh Face' contest hosted by Ibibo, she secured a two-year contract with Elite Model Management and a portfolio photoshoot with fashion photographer Dabboo Ratnani. During her modelling career, she appeared in a print campaign for Reliance Trends, walked the runway at Wills Lifestyle India Fashion Week in 2010, and participated in Lakmé Fashion Week. She also appeared in television commercials for brands including Amul and Samsung Hero Mobile, the latter alongside Aamir Khan.

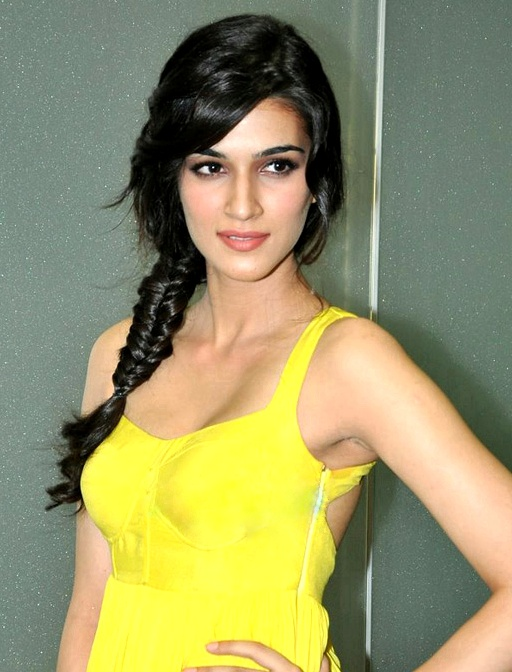
Sanon at an event for Heropanti in 2014

Sanon made her acting debut in 2014 with the Telugu psychological action thriller 1: Nenokkadine, playing the love interest of Mahesh Babu's character. The part required her to participate in action sequences filmed at sea; she has said that the experience made her nervous as she did not know how to swim. Reviewers for The Times of India and Sify took note of her beauty and were encouraging of her acting prowess. After completing the first schedule of 1: Nenokkadine, Sanon was signed on for Heropanti, a Hindi action film opposite newcomer Tiger Shroff; she divided her time between both films. Trade journalist Taran Adarsh opined that Sanon "has the trappings of a star", but critic Srijana Das of The Times of India criticised her emoting, calling it "more cheesy than sharp". Heropanti emerged as a commercial success. Sanon won the Filmfare Award for Best Female Debut and the IIFA Award for Star Debut of the Year – Female for Heropanti.

The following year, Sanon had her second Telugu film release in the crime drama Dohchay, co-starring Naga Chaitanya. She was next cast in Rohit Shetty's action comedy Dilwale with Varun Dhawan, Shah Rukh Khan and Kajol, which emerged as one of the highest-grossing Indian films at that time, grossing more than ₹3.72 billion (US$40 million) worldwide. Anupama Chopra disliked the film and wrote that Sanon and Dhawan "work as bait, meant to bring in the critical youth segment".

After a yearlong absence from the screen, Sanon teamed with Maddock Films producer Dinesh Vijan, in their first of many collaborations, in his directorial debut Raabta (2017), which featured her and Sushant Singh Rajput as star-crossed lovers. In a scathing review, Sukanya Verma of Rediff.com labelled the film "embarrassingly daft" but took note of Sanon's "statuesque, spirited presence". The film failed commercially. Sanon's starring role as a headstrong small-town woman aspiring to a better life in Ashwiny Iyer Tiwari's romantic comedy-drama Bareilly Ki Barfi was better received. Co-starring Ayushmann Khurrana and Rajkummar Rao as her love interests, the film was an adaptation of French writer Nicholas Barreau's novel The Ingredients of Love. Saibal Chatterjee of NDTV noted that "the burden of making Bareilly Ki Barfi work rests upon Kriti Sanon and she doesn't put a foot wrong", but Shubhra Gupta of The Indian Express thought that despite Sanon's effort, her performance lacked naturalism.

Sanon worked in two of Vijan's productions in 2019. She starred in cinematographer Laxman Utekar's Hindi directorial debut, Luka Chuppi, a satire on live-in relationships, which paired her opposite Kartik Aaryan. Devesh Sharma of Filmfare was appreciative of her comic timing. A commercial success, Luka Chuppi grossed ₹1.29 billion (US$14 million) worldwide. Following an appearance in the unremarkable comedy Arjun Patiala, Sanon played one of the female leads in the reincarnation comedy Housefull 4, the fourth instalment of the Housefull franchise, which paired her opposite Akshay Kumar. Despite poor reviews, Housefull 4 was one of the biggest grossers of the year, earning over ₹2.8 billion (US$30 million). In her final appearance of 2019, Sanon portrayed Parvatibai opposite Arjun Kapoor's Sadashivrao Bhau in Ashutosh Gowariker's period drama Panipat, based on the Third Battle of Panipat, which emerged as a box-office bomb.

=== Mimi and career fluctuations (2021–2023) ===
Sanon collaborated once again with Vijan and Utekar in the comedy-drama Mimi (2021), which proved to be a turning point in her career. A remake of the 2011 Marathi drama Mala Aai Vhhaychy!, it starred her in the title role of an aspiring actress who becomes a surrogate mother. Sanon gained 15 kg of weight for scenes involving her character's pregnancy. The film was released digitally on Netflix and JioCinema. Critics were generally unimpressed with the film, but Sanon's performance received praise, with Mashable India deeming it a career-best. Saibal Chatterjee praised Sanon's ability to navigate a wide range of emotions, describing her performance as a "solid account of herself" despite his criticism of the film. Sanon received several awards for her performance, including the Filmfare Award for Best Actress and the National Film Award for Best Actress (shared with Alia Bhatt for Gangubai Kathiawadi). Her next release, the comedy Hum Do Hamare Do (2021) opposite Rajkummar Rao, premiered on Disney+ Hotstar. Saibal Chatterjee found hers to be "the most noteworthy performance in [the] unfunny caper".

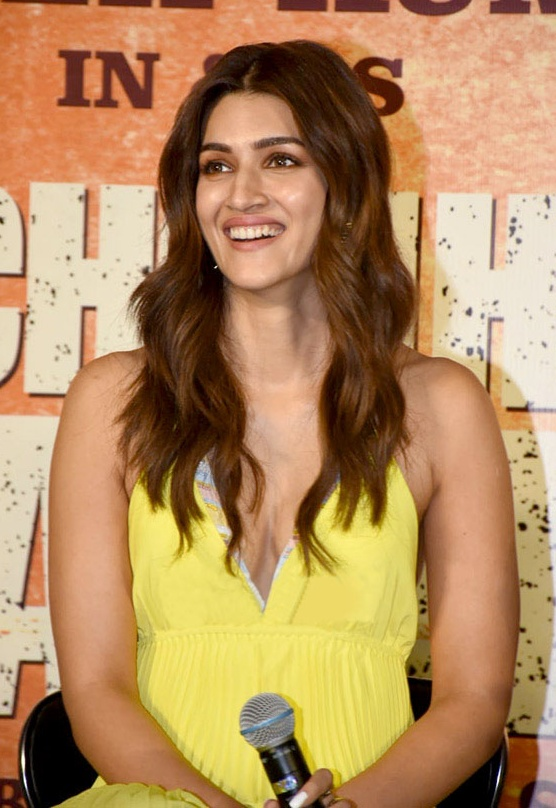
Sanon at an event for Bachchhan Paandey in 2022

Sanon’s first release in 2022 came with the action comedy Bachchhan Paandey, which marked her second collaboration with Akshay Kumar. Adapted from the 2014 Tamil film Jigarthanda, Sanon played a part originally portrayed by a male actor. The film was unable to recoup its ₹180 crore (US$19 million) investment. Sanon starred with Varun Dhawan in Bhediya, the third instalment in Dinesh Vijan's horror-comedy universe. It was shot over a span of two months in various locations of Arunachal Pradesh. Sonal Dedhia of News18 noted how much she stood out in the film despite her limited screen time.

In 2023, Sanon played the female lead opposite Kartik Aaryan in Shehzada, a remake of the Telugu film Ala Vaikunthapurramuloo. The film was a critical and commercial failure, with Zinia Bandyopadhyay of India Today dismissing her as "completely wasted". She played Janaki in Om Raut's mythological film Adipurush, based on the Hindu epic Ramayana, co-starring Prabhas as Raghava. She agreed to the project as she deemed such films "educational for kids". Filmed simultaneously in Hindi and Telugu, it had a production budget of around ₹6 billion (US$64 million), making it one of the most-expensive Indian films. Critical reception to the film was negative; Devesh Sharma opined, "Sanon is divinely beautiful as Janki but doesn't have much to do here, except look the part of a damsel in distress." Amidst several controversies, it emerged as another box-office bomb for Sanon. She then reunited with Tiger Shroff in Vikas Bahl's science fiction action film Ganapath. Once again, it was a critical and commercial failure.

=== Renewed success (2024–present) ===
In 2024, Sanon starred with Shahid Kapoor in Teri Baaton Mein Aisa Uljha Jiya, a science fiction romantic comedy between a man and a robot, in which she played Sifra, a humanoid robot. Monika Rawal Kukreja of Hindustan Times was appreciative of her look and body language as a robot, but bemoaned that "the poor storyline doesn't really let her go all out". She next starred with Tabu and Kareena Kapoor Khan in the female-led heist comedy Crew, in which the trio played flight attendants. In preparation, they received training from former cabin crew members. Zinia Bandyopadhyay of India Today was appreciative of Sanon for holding her own in the presence of Tabu and Kapoor Khan. Both Teri Baaton Mein Aisa Uljha Jiya and Crew emerged as commercial successes, ranking among the highest-grossing Hindi films of 2024.

Sanon at an event for Crew in 2024

Sanon launched her own production company, named Blue Butterfly Films, under which she produced Do Patti, a mystery film for Netflix co-starring Kajol and Shaheer Sheikh. She expressed that her role in Mimi inspired her to seek out more well-written roles and pursue greater creative freedom in her career. Sanon played dual roles of Saumya and Shailee, twin sisters with contrasting personalities. In a negative review of the film, Nandini Ramnath of Scroll.in praised Sanon for being "compelling in her anguish as well as her inner strength".

In Aanand L. Rai's romantic drama Tere Ishk Mein (2025), Sanon starred opposite Dhanush in a role where she said she "completely surrendered" herself to Rai's vision. News18's Titas Chowdhury reviewed: "After Do Patti, here we’ve Kriti Sanon playing another abuse victim in yet another problematic fashion, setting a dangerous precedent". It emerged as a successful financial venture for the actress. The following year, Sanon, Shahid Kapoor and Rashmika Mandanna starred as a trio involved in a love triangle in the romantic comedy Cocktail 2 (2026), a spiritual sequel to the 2012 film Cocktail. Prachi Arya of India Today found Sanon's character less compelling than Deepika Padukone's in the predecessor due to the role's poor characterisation. The film failed commercially.

== Other work and media image ==
Commenting on her career growth in 2017, Chandni Sehgal from Vogue India wrote that she was "more introspective, focused and less insecure" than when she started out. A journalist for Hindustan Times called Sanon a "confident performer" who "can switch from glamourous [sic] to small town personas with ease." In 2021, Sukanya Verma featured her in Rediff.com's list of "Best Bollywood Actresses". Harper's Bazaar's Meghna Sharma stated: "Counted amongst the top female actors in the country today, Kriti's quiet determination can be credited for her steady rise." Nibandh Vinod from News 18 calls Sanon "one of the most versatile actresses of Bollywood" and credits her "dedication and hard work over the years" for carving "a place for herself in the film industry".

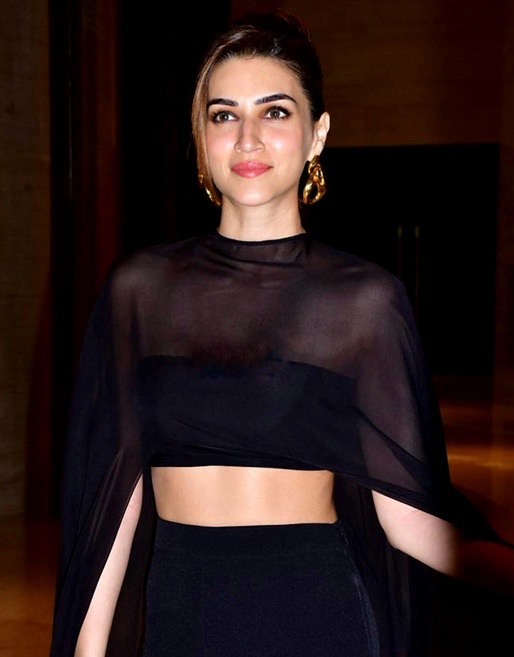
Sanon in 2026

In 2019, Sanon appeared in Forbes India's Celebrity 100 list, ranking 38th with an estimated annual income of ₹80.9 million (US$860,000). In 2022, the Indian edition of GQ featured her among the nation's "30 Most Influential Young Indians" list. In 2024, she was placed 25th on IMDb's List of 100 Most Viewed Indian Stars. Sanon has often gained attention for her sense of style. Sanon has a large social media footprint, with over 54 million followers on Instagram. In 2021, she modelled for designer Manish Malhotra's bridal collection "Nooraniyat". During the COVID-19 pandemic, Sanon donated a sum to government's fund. She later collected funds for Kailash Sathyarthi Children's Foundation. Sanon has performed at the opening ceremony of the 2017 Indian Premier League and the 2023 Women's Premier League.

Sanon is an endorser for several brands and products including Coca-Cola, Titan's Raga, Parachute and Tissot. In the Times of India's 50 Most Desirable Women list, she ranked 14th in 2017, 13th in 2018, 15th in 2019 and 19th in 2020. Sanon has been vocal on various topics, including pay disparity in Hindi cinema and the "patriarchal mindset" prevalent in the industry. In 2016, Sanon launched her own clothing line, named Ms. Taken. In 2022, she co-founded a fitness startup called The Tribe, and the following year, she launched her skincare brand Hyphen. Within its first year, Hyphen generated revenue of ₹100 crore (US $12 million), which grew to ₹400 crore (US $47 million) in its second year.

In 2026, Sanon appeared in a Raksha Bandhan-themed advertisement for the jewellery brand GIVA, which attracted criticism over her Indo-Western attire, deemed by some to be inappropriate for the traditional festival. Responding to the controversy, Sanon defended her outfit, stating that "ethnic fashion has evolved over the years" and asserting that "a woman's respect for her culture should not be measured by her clothes". The advertisement was subsequently withdrawn.

== Filmography ==
Key
†	Denotes films that have not yet been released

All films are in Hindi unless otherwise noted.

Year	Title	Role	Notes	Ref.
2014	1: Nenokkadine	Sameera	Telugu film	
2014	Heropanti	Dimple "Dimpy" Chaudhary		
2015	Dohchay	Meera Varma	Telugu film	
2015	Dilwale	Ishita Malik		
2017	Raabta	Saira Singh / Saiba Qazi (Note: Sanon played dual roles in the film.)		
2017	Bareilly Ki Barfi	Bitti Mishra		
2018	Stree	—	Special appearance in song "Aao Kabhi Haveli Pe"	
2019	Luka Chuppi	Rashmi Trivedi		
2019	Arjun Patiala	Ritu Randhawa		
2019	Kalank	—	Special appearance in song "Aira Gaira"	
2019	Pati Patni Aur Woh	Neha Khanna	Cameo appearance	
2019	Housefull 4	Rajkumari Madhu / Kriti Thakral		
2019	Panipat	Parvati Bai		
2021	Mimi	Mimi Rathore		
2021	Hum Do Hamare Do	Aanya Mehra		
2022	Bachchhan Paandey	Myra Devekar		
2022	Heropanti 2	—	Special appearance in song "Whistle Baja 2.0"	
2022	Bhediya	Dr. Anika Mittal		
2023	Shehzada	Samara Singh		
2023	Adipurush	Janaki	Hindi-Telugu bilingual film	
2023	Ganapath	Jassi Singh		
2024	Teri Baaton Mein Aisa Uljha Jiya	SIFRA		
2024	Crew	Divya Rana		
2024	Do Patti	Saumya Pundir / Shailee Pundir	Also producer	
2025	Tere Ishk Mein	Mukti Beniwal		
2026	Cocktail 2	Alisha "Ally"		
2026	Hai Jawani Toh Ishq Hona Hai	Disha	Cameo appearance	

== Awards and nominations ==
Sanon received a National Film Award for Best Actress in 2023 for her performance in Mimi (2021). She has received three Filmfare Awards nominations: Best Female Debut for Heropanti (2014), Best Actress for Mimi (2021), and Teri Baaton Mein Aisa Uljha Jiya (2025), winning the former two.

== See also ==
- List of Indian film actresses
