= Holy Trinity Catholic Church (Shreveport, Louisiana) =

Historic church in Louisiana, United States

- U.S. National Register of Historic Places
- U.S. Historic district – Contributing property
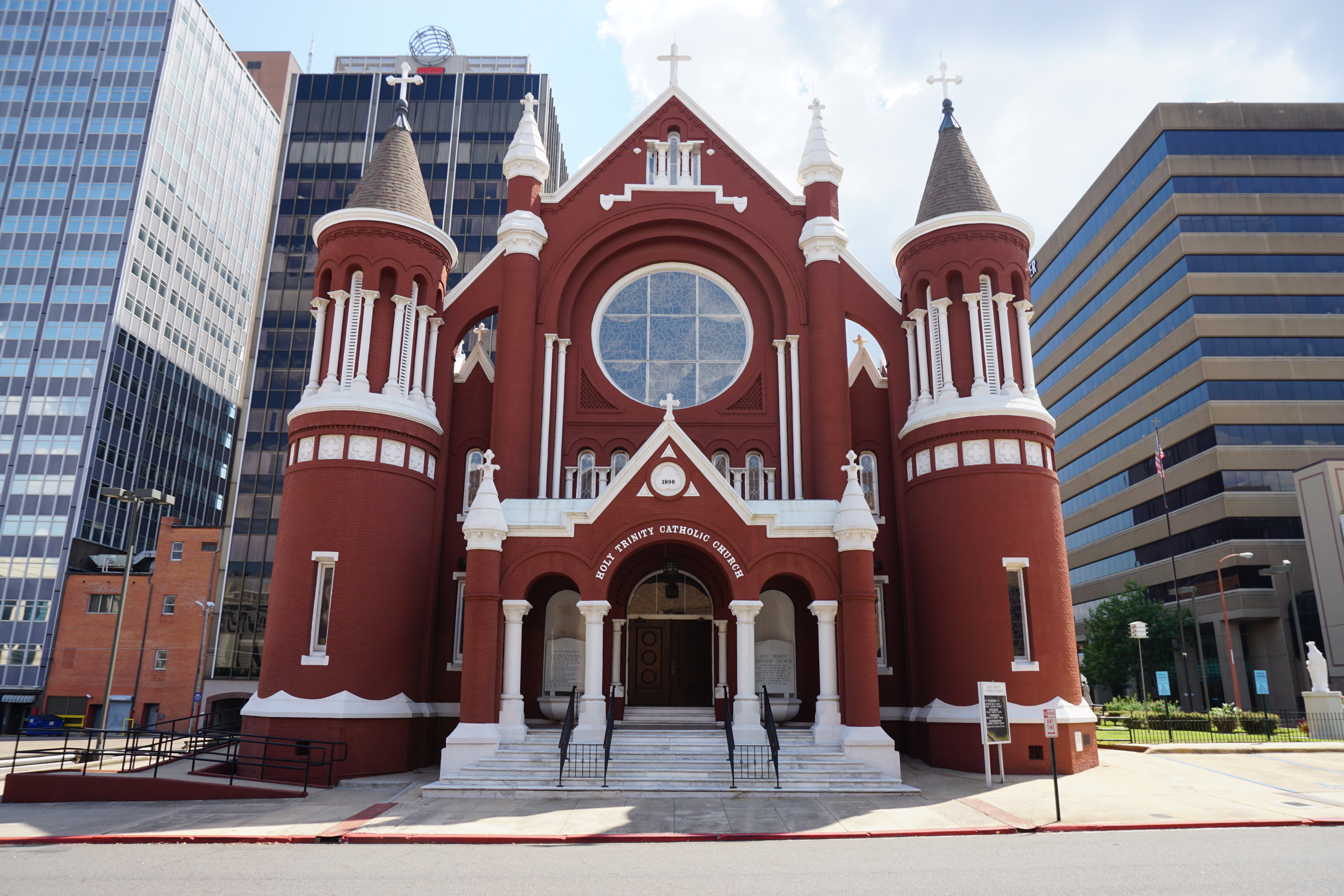

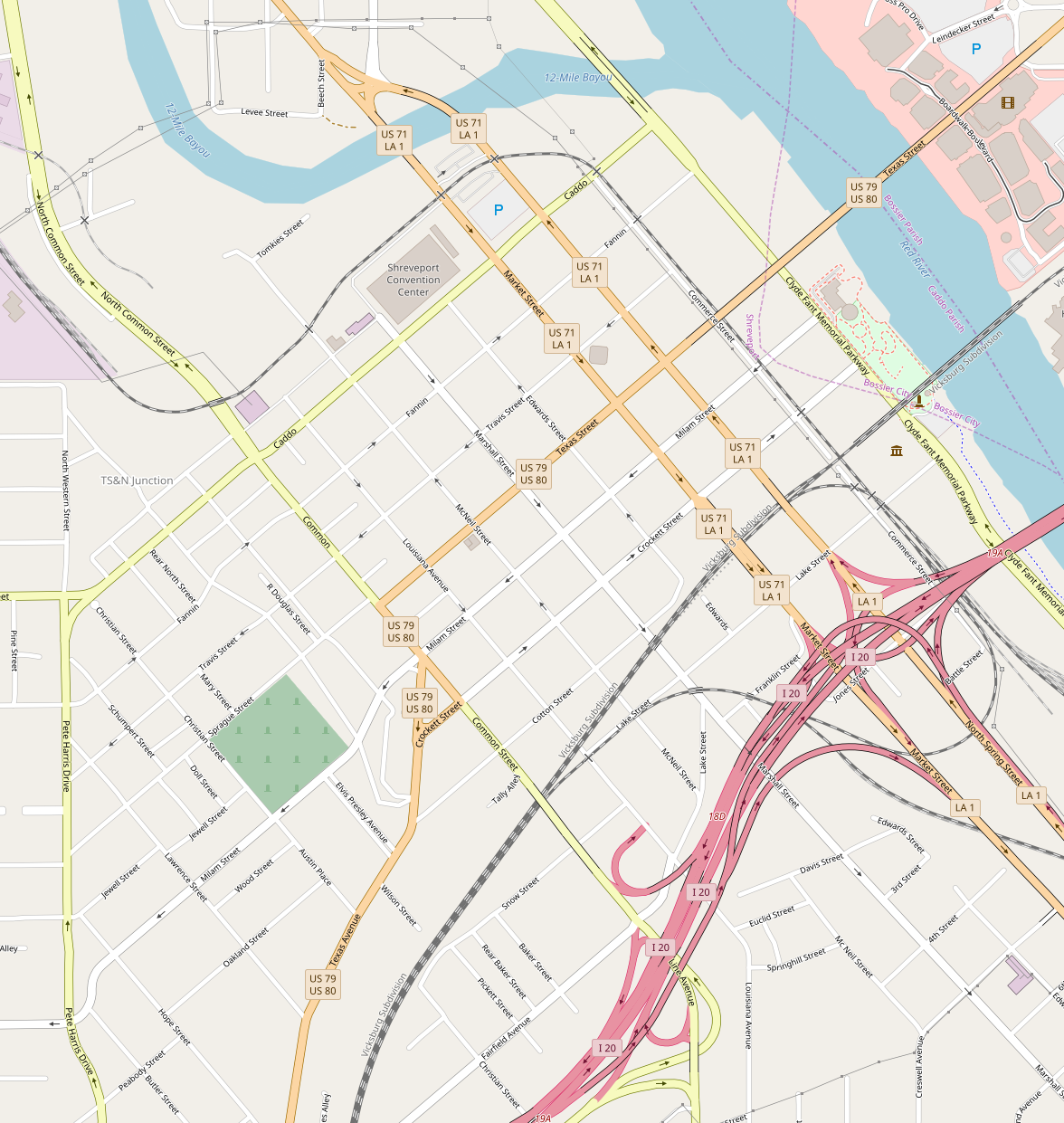
- Location within Shreveport Downtown
- Location: 315 Marshall Street, Shreveport, Louisiana
- Coordinates: 32°30′52″N 93°45′03″W
- Area: 0.75 acres (0.30 ha)
- Built: 1896
- Architect: Nicholas J. Clayton
- Architectural style: Romanesque
- Part of: Shreveport Commercial Historic District (ID82002760)
- NRHP reference No.: 84001261

Significant dates
- Added to NRHP: September 27, 1984
- Designated CP: April 29, 2015

Holy Trinity Catholic Church in Shreveport, Louisiana was built in 1896. It was listed on the National Register of Historic Places in 1984. The current structure is the third church, with the first being constructed in 1856 by Fr. Jean Pierre, who became the first pastor. During the city's Yellow Fever epidemic of 1873, Fr. Jean Pierre and his assistant pastor, Fr. Isidore Quemerais, both gave their lives while caring for the sick and dying.

The church also became a contributing property of Shreveport Commercial Historic District when its boundaries were increased on April 29, 2015.

== Interior ==
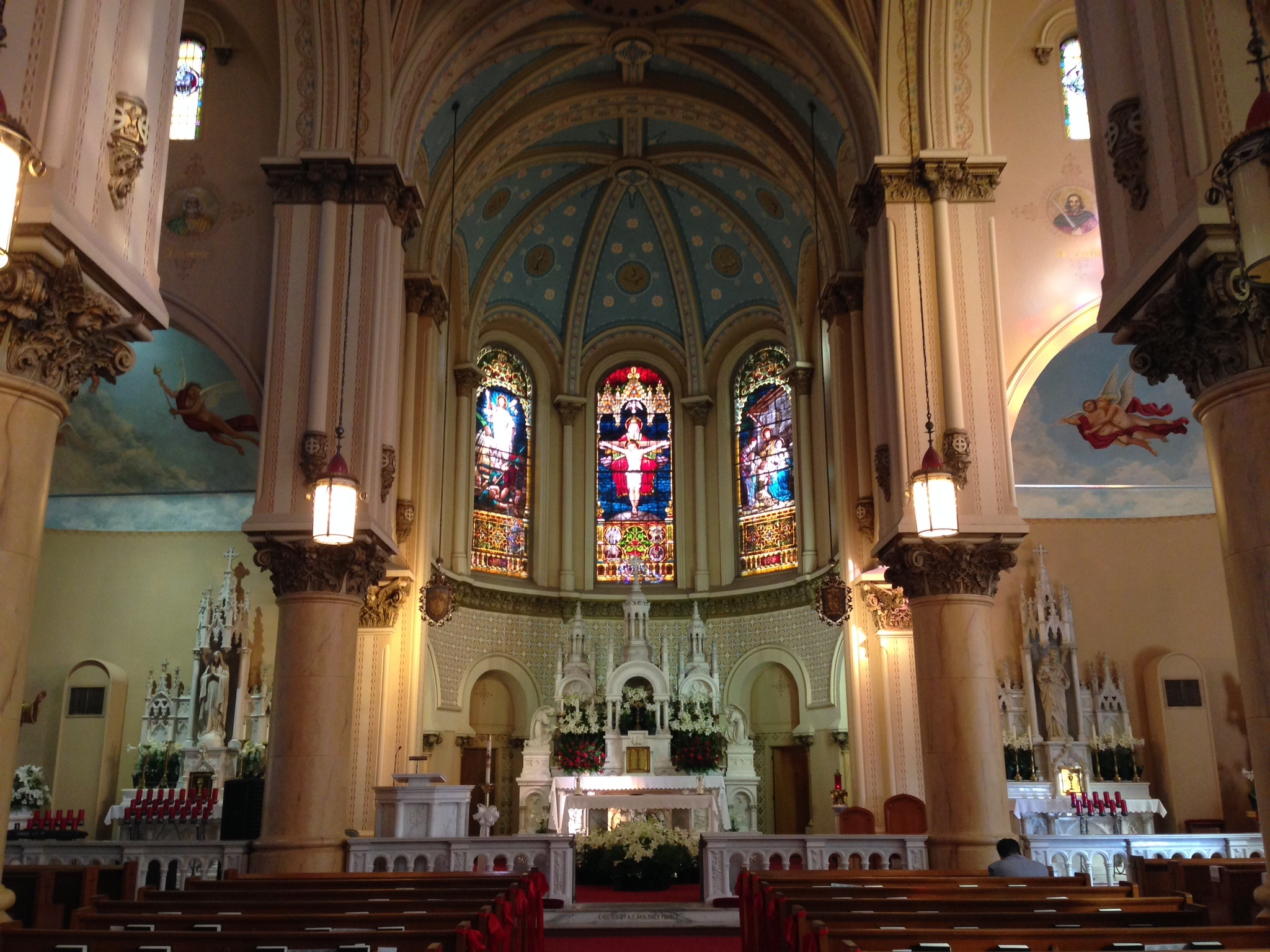
The interior of Holy Trinity Catholic Church

The Romanesque Revival interior of the church. Note the Communion Rail, as it is one of the last fully present Communion Rails in a Catholic church in the City of Shreveport. The side Altars are not original to the church. The two Gothic Revival side Altars are from a former church in the area. The church was extensively renovated and restored under Monsignor O'Hanlon starting in the 1970s.

== See also ==
- Cathedral of St. John Berchmans
- National Register of Historic Places listings in Caddo Parish, Louisiana
