= Jaypee University of Engineering and Technology =

Private university in Madhya Pradesh

- Other name: JUET
- Former names: Jaypee Institute of Engineering and Technology
- Motto: Education, Enlightenment, Empowerment
- Type: Private
- Established: 2003
- Accreditation: UGC
- Chancellor: Sh. Jaiprakash Gaur
- Vice-Chancellor: Prof. D. K. Rai
- Dean: Prof. Vipin Tyagi
- Undergraduates: 1650
- Location: Raghogarh, Guna, Madhya Pradesh, India; 24°26′07″N 77°09′39″E
- Campus: JUET Campus
- Colors: Blue and white
- Website: www.juet.ac.in

Jaypee University of Engineering and Technology (JUET), formerly Jaypee Institute of Engineering and Technology, is a private engineering University located at Raghogarh, Guna, Madhya Pradesh, India.

== University Status ==
Jaypee University of Engineering & Technology, Raghogarh, Guna (M.P.) has been established under Madhya Pradesh Private University (Sthapana Avam Sanchalan) Samsodhan Adhiniyam 2010 vide Act No. 23 of 2010 published in Madhya Pradesh Gazette (Extraordinary) Notification Sr. No. 420 dated 13 August 2010.

The university is approved by UGC under UGC Act, 1956, and is empowered to award degrees as specified under section 22 of UGC Act.

- JUET has been accredited with grade "A+" by NAAC
- JUET Ranked Amongst India's Top Private Universities : Seasonal Magazine 2015
- AICTE and UGC Approved University
- Approval/Membership - Association of Indian Universities

Establishment of university by Madhya Pradesh Act No. 23 of 2010 - Madhya Pradedh Niji Vishwavidyalaya (Sthapna Avam Sanchalan) Sansodhan Adhiniyam, 2010

== Campus ==
JUET is approved as a remote center of IIT Bombay under NME-ICT program of ministry of HRD.

== Departments ==
The university includes the following departments:

- Department of Computer Science and Engineering
- Department of Electronics and Communication Technology
- Department of Civil Engineering
- Department of Physics
- Department of Mathematics
- Department of Mechanical Engineering
- Department of Chemical Engineering
- Department of Chemistry
- Department of Humanities & Social Sciences
- Cement Research Development Centre
- Wind Engineering Application Centre

== Academics ==
=== Academic Programmes ===
Institute offers undergraduate programs leading to a Bachelor of Technology degree, postgraduate programs leading to a Master of Technology degree and PhD (Doctor of Philosophy) degree. Institute also offers BSc and MSc program.

=== Programs Offered ===
- Faculty of Engineering
  - B.Tech.
    - Chemical Engineering
    - Civil Engineering
    - Computer Science & Engineering
    - Computer Science & Engineering (Artificial Intelligence and Machine Learning)
    - Computer Science & Engineering (Data Science)
    - Computer Science & Engineering (Cyber Security)
    - Electronics & Communication Engineering
    - Electronics Engineering (VLSI Design & Technology)
    - Mechanical Engineering
    - Mechanical & Mechatronics Engineering (Additive Manufacturing)
  - M.Tech.
    - Chemical Engineering
    - Civil Engineering
      - Construction Management
      - Environmental Engineering
      - Structural Engineering
    - Computer Science & Engineering (Specialization offered in (i) AI & DS (ii) AI & ML)
    - Electronics & Communication Engineering (Specialization offered in (i) Microelectronics and VLSI Design (ii) Internet of Things)
    - Mechanical Engineering
      - Manufacturing Technology (Specialization offered in (i) Machine Design (ii) Thermal Engineering)
  - Ph.D.
    - Chemical Engineering
    - Civil Engineering
    - Computer Science & Engineering
    - Electronics & Communication Engineering
    - Mechanical Engineering
    - Chemistry
    - Humanities & Social Sciences
    - Mathematics
    - Physics
- Faculty of Mathematical Sciences
  - B.Sc. Hons. (Mathematics)
  - M.Sc. (Mathematics)
  - Ph.D. (Mathematics)
- Faculty of Sciences
  - B.Sc. (Hons.) in Chemistry
  - B.Sc. (Hons.) in Physics
  - M.Sc. (Chemistry)
  - M.Sc. (Physics)
  - Ph.D. (Chemistry)
  - Ph.D. (Physics)
- Management
  - Bachelor of Business Administration (BBA)
- Diploma
  - Civil Engineering
  - Mechanical Engineering

=== Philosophy of teaching and examination ===
The philosophy of teaching and examination aim to develop a number of qualities in students such as:

- Sustained Disciplined Work
- Self Learning
- Flexibility in Pace of Learning
- Design Orientation
- Quality Consciousness
- Co-operative working etc.

Accordingly, the course structure of each program have been prepared for credit based semester system. The Courses are designed to provide a strong blend of class room lectures, tutorials, laboratory work, hands-on practice oriented projects, design projects, plant visits and seminars. Provision of electives and flexibility of choosing extra credits give the students an opportunities to develop in areas of their interest.

The concept of transparent continuous evaluation is followed. The students have to appear in T-1, T-2 and T-3 examination in every semester, besides students are required to be regular in attendance. The results are announced within two weeks of examinations. Grade system is followed.

=== Rankings ===
JUET has been accredited with grade "A+" by NAAC in Cycle-2 w.e.f. 22 March 2023. JUET has been recognised as an ‘Excellent University' by Madhya Pradesh Private University Regulatory Commission (MPPURC), Bhopal in October 2018. JUET has been accredited with grade "A" by NAAC in Cycle-1 w.e.f. 5 November 2016 JUET Ranked Amongst India's Top Private Universities : Seasonal Magazine 2015

=== Collaboration and international relations ===
Jaypee University has international relations with University of Florida

== Student life ==
=== Hostel ===
The university has separate hostel facilities for boys and girls. Presently, there are 21 blocks of boy's hostels having the capacity to accommodate 2360 students. The girls hostel is having the capacity to accommodate around 424 inmates.

== See also ==
- Jaypee Institute of Information Technology
- Jaypee University of Information Technology
