= Jaypee Group =

Indian diversified conglomerate

- Type: Public
- Industry: Conglomerate
- Founded: 1958; 68 years ago
- Founder: Jaiprakash Gaur
- Headquarters: Noida, Uttar Pradesh, India
- Products: Engineering; Construction; Power; Fertilizer; Hospitality; Healthcare; Expressways; Information Technology
- Revenue: ▼₹6,612.88 crore (US$690 million) (2021)
- Number of employees: 8000 (2025)
- Website: www.jalindia.com

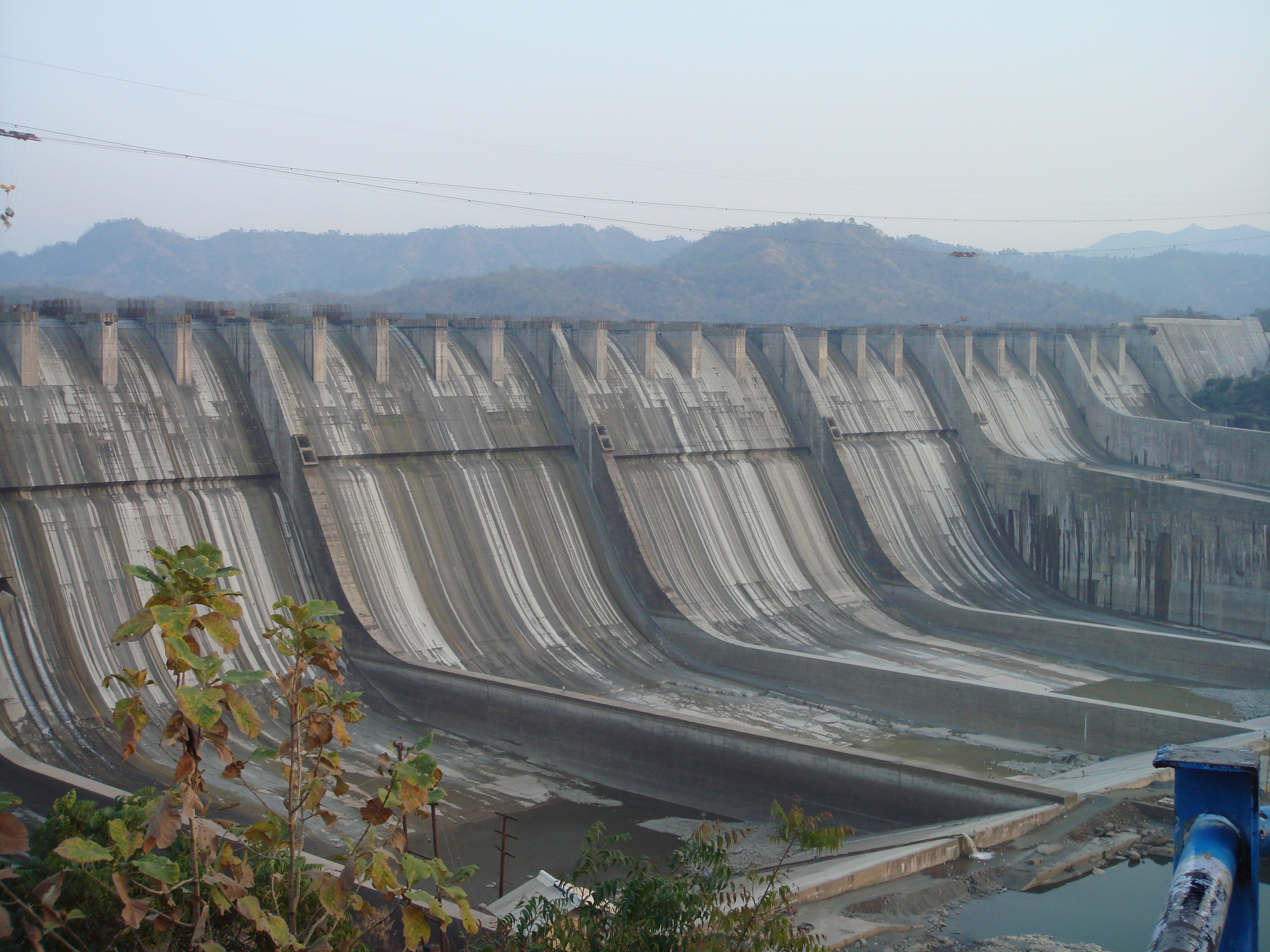
Sardar Sarovar Dam, India

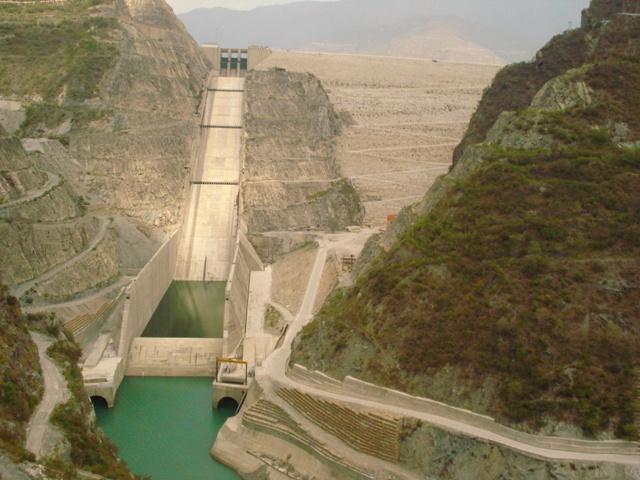
Tehri Dam India – the largest rock and earth fill dam in Asia, completed by Jaypee

Jaiprakash Associates Limited is an Indian conglomerate and the flagship company of the Jaypee Group. It is headquartered in Noida, Uttar Pradesh, with interests in engineering, construction, power, real estate, hospitality, IT, sports and education (non-profit). Facing claims of ₹57,185 crore from creditors, Allahabad bench of the National Company Law Tribunal admitted JAL for insolvency in 2024. The insolvency proceeding is being administered by resolution professional Bhuvan Madan of Deloitte. The firm is in the process of being acquired by Adani Enterprises.

== Overview ==
Manoj Gaur is the elder son of Jaiprakash Gaur. He is the Chairman of Jaiprakash Associates Limited. Jaypee has cement production and private sector hydropower company with 1,700 MW in operation. The Jaypee Group successfully completed projects in 18 states of India and Bhutan. Jaypee is the engineering and construction company for India's Yamuna Expressway, which opened 9 August 2012.

JIL, the group flagship, has an engineering and construction wing which mostly supports Jaypee projects. It also has the largest land bank in India's National Capital Region, i.e., New Delhi. Jaypee has two thermal power plants (Bina Thermal Power plant – 500 MW and Nigrie Thermal Power Plant – 2X660 MW).

== History ==
Jaiprakash Gaur founded the conglomerate in 1979. After acquiring a Diploma in Civil Engineering in 1950 from the now called Indian Institute of Technology Roorkee (IITR) in Roorkee, Uttarakhand, he had a stint with the Government of Uttar Pradesh. Later he became an entrepreneur, starting as a civil contractor in 1958.

- 2014 - In August 2014, Shree Cement announced that it is set to acquire Jaiprakash Associates' 1.5 million tonne grinding unit at Panipat for 360 crore. The Jaypee group has been selling most of its cement assets to reduce its debt.
- 2015 - In September 2015, JSW Energy acquired two hydropower Projects of Jaiprakash Associates in a deal worth ₹ 9,700 crore.
- 2017 - UltraTech Cement completed the ₹16,189 crore acquisition of Jaiprakash Associates' six integrated cement plants and five grinding units, having a capacity of 21.2 million tonnes.
- 2019 - Commissioning of 720 MW Hydro project (having 114 M high concrete dam and underground powerhouse having 4x180 MW generators) for Mangdechhu Hydro Electric Power Project Authority in Bhutan.
- 2022 - Dalmia Bharat signed a binding agreement to acquire Jaiprakash Associates’ cement, clinker and power plants at an enterprise value of ₹5,666 crore.
- July 2025 - Vedanta acquires Jaiparkash Associates in ₹17,000 crore (equivalent to ₹180 billion or US$1.8 billion in 2026) bid.
- November 2025 - Promoter Gaur family bids Rs. 18000 crores to regain control of the company, however, Manoj Gaur (Executive Chairman) gets arrested by ED a few days after the bid and the bid was ignored.
- 19 November 2025 - The Adani Group received an approval for this hostile takeover through its bid to acquire the debt-laden Jaiprakash Associates under a ₹14,535 crore (equivalent to ₹150 billion or US$1.6 billion in 2026) resolution plan from the Committee of Creditors (majority of what consisted BJP government backing) of Jaiprakash Associates. The group secured a majority votes from the lenders. This plan offered a higher upfront payment than competing bids. The firm received a Letter of Intent (LoI) from the "Resolution Professional" (RP) at 3:05 p.m.
- 17 March 2026 - According to Adani Enterprises, a part of the Adani Group, the National Company Law Tribunal (NCLT) has approved their resolution plan. However, according to Jaiprakash Associates, since the liquidation value of the Successful Resolution Applicant is insufficient to even satisfy the claims of secured creditors in full, NIL consideration is being offered to the shareholders of the Corporate Debtor as part of the delisting process under the Approved Resolution Plan, and the exit price for the existing shareholders is therefore NIL.
- 22 March 2026 - Vedanta Group moved NCLATagainst approval of Adani's resolution plan which secured 89% votes from the lenders of Jaiprakash Associates. The case will be heard of on 23 Match in front of a two member bend, including Chairperson Justice Ashok Bhushan and Member (Technical) Barun Mitra.
- 24 March 2026 - Vedanta lost the case as the NCLAT bench refused to provide any interim relief at this stage.
- 18 May 2026 - Adani Group's Ambuja Cement remained the only competitor with its ₹580 crore (equivalent to ₹599 crore or US$62 million in 2026) bid to acquire Jaypee Cements. The offer, however, is much lower than the liquidation value of ₹880 crore (equivalent to ₹909 crore or US$94 million in 2026). My Home Group was the only other bidder with an offer of ₹300 crore (equivalent to ₹310 crore or US$32 million in 2026) and has exited the procedure and the stakeholders are negotiating with the Adani Group to further raise the offer. If the negotiation does not improve the offer, the banks are likely to vote in favour of liquidation.
- 22 May 2026 - Dalmia Cement (Bharat) Ltd announced a deal to acquire key cement assets of Jaiprakash Associates Ltd (JAL) from the Adani Group-led insolvency resolution process for an enterprise value of ₹2,850 crore (equivalent to ₹29 billion or US$310 million in 2026). The Business Transfer Agreement was signed on 21 May with Adani Infra (India) Ltd and covered cement plants at Rewa, Madhya Pradesh and Churk, Chunar and Sadwa, Uttar Pradesh which have a combined 5.2 million tonnes per annum (MnTPA) cement capacity and 3.3 MnTPA clinker capacity. The acquisition also included 99 MW of thermal power capacity as well as railway sidings at Rewa and Chunar, along with a common railway siding at Churk.

== Controversies ==
- In November 2017, the Supreme Court of India barred the directors from selling their personal assets.
- Due to debt, Jaiprakash Associates did not pay back its fixed deposit holders on time. The National Company Law Tribunal had extended the deadline to 31 March 2017 to settle the same.
- As of 2022, the company had attracted the notice of several US-based mutual funds and ETFs, who reported owning significant positions in the company. Investors in the company include Dimensional Fund Advisors and WisdomTree.
