= Shailendra Singh (producer) =

Indian film producer

- Born: India
- Occupations: Entrepreneur, sports marketer, film producer, author
- Known for: Co-founder of Percept Limited; Inceptor of Sunburn Festival; Guestlist4Good; Boss Entertainment LLP
- Spouse: Nayana Singh

Shailendra Singh is an Indian film producer, entrepreneur, author, and media executive associated with the Indian entertainment industry. He is known for co-founding the entertainment and communications company Percept and co-creator of the Sunburn Festival, one of the largest electronic dance music festivals in Asia that contributed to the growth of the EDM scene in India.

In his career, he has been associated with the production and distribution of over 70 feature films, including Page 3, Dor, Malamaal Weekly, Makdee, Khuda Kay Liye, and created India's first commercial animation film Hanuman (2005).

== Career ==
Singh co-founded Percept Ltd, an entertainment and communications company in India. In the late 1990s he was involved in developing sports marketing initiatives and commercial sponsorship deals, including partnerships related to Indian cricket.

He later launched Percept Talent, a talent management company with Lachlan Murdoch, that managed Aishwarya Rai, Hrithik Roshan, Yuvraj Singh, Kapil Dev, and others for endorsements and media engagements.

In 2007, Singh co-created the Sunburn Festival at Candolim Beach in Goa. The event later expanded into formats such as Sunburn Arena, Reload, Campus and City Festivals. In 2014, the International Music Summit ranked Sunburn among the largest electronic music festivals globally. Singh was also included in the mix list of 50 influential people in electronic dance music, where he was the only Indian named.

Singh has been active in film production through Percept Picture Company and related initiatives. Over the course of his career he has been associated with the production and distribution of more than seventy feature films. Films linked to his production work include Makdee (2002), Phir Milenge (2004), Hanuman (2005), Malamaal Weekly (2006), Dor (2006), Bhool Bhulaiyaa (2007), and Kanchivaram (2008).

In 2016 he made his directorial debut with the Hindi road comedy-drama Sunshine Music Tours and Travels, which follows a group of young travelers traveling across India.

In 2017, he stepped down as Joint Managing Director of Percept Limited following a family settlement. Management control of the company transferred to his brother Harindra Singh, while Singh remained a shareholder.

Beyond film production, Singh has launched several ventures in entertainment, events and media. These include the social entertainment initiative Guestlist4Good, a platform that organizes concerts and performances in collaboration with charitable organizations.

== Film and media ==
Singh has been credited with producing and releasing 72 feature films through Percept's film operations and other ventures. At the International Film Festival of India, Shailendra Singh announced a slate of 11 feature films and stated his intention to prioritize storytelling as the central focus of his cinematic projects.

== Selected filmography ==
- Pyaar Mein Kabhi Kabhi (1999)
- Makdee (2002)
- Phir Milenge (2004)
- Hanuman (2005)
- Khuda Kay Liye (2007)
- Bhool Bhulaiyaa (2007)
- Kanchivaram (2008)

== Awards and recognitions ==
- National Film Awards – Kanchivaram (three awards, 2008)
- Dynamic Entrepreneur of the Year – India Leadership Conclave (2011)
- Brand Icon of the Year – India Leadership Conclave (2013)
- MTV Staying Alive Award (2004)
- Filmfare Power List – 12th most powerful in Bollywood (2009)
