= Stree =

Stree (transl. Woman) can refer to:

- Stree (1961 film), an Indian fantasy film
- Stree (1968 film), an Indian Odia film
- Stree (1972 film), an Indian Bengali film
- Stree (2018 film), an Indian horror comedy film by Amar Kaushik
  - Stree (soundtrack), its soundtrack album by Sachin–Jigar
- Stree (TV series), an Indian Bengali-language soap opera which premiered in 2016
- Stree (publisher), an imprint of Bhatkal and Sen, Calcutta

== See also ==
- Sthree (disambiguation)
- Stri, a 1995 Indian Telugu film
- Stri Parva, a book of the Mahabharata
