= Sunshine Music Tours and Travels =

Sunshine Music Tours & Travels
- Theatrical release poster
- Directed by: Shailendra Singh
- Written by: Shailendra Singh; Sehaj K Maini
- Starring: Sunny Kaushal; Ashrut Abhinan Jain; Jaswinder Singh; Suhas Joshi; Himayat Sayed; Divya Jyotee Sharma; Subha Rajput; Nida Chakaborty; Deepak Kalra
- Music by: Adam Avil; Eddie Avil
- Production companies: Hayre Entertainment; Percept Pictures
- Release date: 2 September 2016
- Country: India
- Language: Hindi

Sunshine Music Tours And Travels is a 2016 Indian road comedy-drama film, directed by Shailendra Singh (in his directorial debut) and produced by Hayre Entertainment and Percept Picture Company. The film revolves around the story of two young boys who are chasing their dreams and take up a road journey from Jammu and Kashmir to Goa along with several strangers. The film features an ensemble cast of debutantes, including Sunny Kaushal. The film was shot in Jammu and Kashmir, Delhi, Jaipur, Ahmedabad and Goa, while using real time footage of the Sunburn Festival of 2015.

== Cast ==
- Sunny Kaushal as Sunburn
- Ashrut Abhinan Jain as Rajma Romeo
- Farhana Bhatt as Kashmiri actress
- Jaswinder Singh as Sr. Sodhi
- Suhas Joshi as Peter Baba
- Himayat Sayed as Driver
- Divyajyotee Sharma as Pushpa
- Subha Rajput as Loveleen
- Nida Chakraborty as Kiran
- Deepak Kalra as Karan the Blogger
- Mayank Kalra as Pratab Singh Thakur
- Sooraj Ohri as Ayushmaan Singh
- Ruchi Malviya as DJ Aman
- Poonam Gurung as Kara
- Ajit Singh Arora as Jr. Sodi
- Sundip Ved as Arjun Kamthe
- Ketan Raste as Cop
- Sanjay Kota as Ghungru
