= Arjun Patiala =

2019 Indian film by Rohit Jugraj

- Theatrical release poster
- Directed by: Rohit Jugraj
- Written by: Ritesh Shah; Sandeep Leyzell
- Produced by: Bhushan Kumar; Dinesh Vijan; Krishan Kumar; Sandeep Leyzell
- Starring: Diljit Dosanjh; Kriti Sanon; Varun Sharma
- Narrated by: Yogesh Grover
- Cinematography: Sudip Sengupta
- Edited by: Huzefa Lokhandwala
- Music by: Songs: Sachin–Jigar; Akash D Guru Randhawa; Score: Ketan Sodha
- Production companies: T-Series; Maddock Films; Bake My Cake Films
- Distributed by: AA Films
- Release date: 26 July 2019
- Running time: 106 minutes
- Country: India
- Language: Hindi
- Budget: ₹25 crore
- Box office: est. ₹9.26 crore

Arjun Patiala is a 2019 Indian Hindi-language action spoof comedy film directed by Rohit Jugraj. Produced by Bhushan Kumar, Krishan Kumar, Dinesh Vijan and Sandeep Leyzell under T-Series, Maddock Films and Bake My Cake Films, it stars Diljit Dosanjh, Kriti Sanon and Varun Sharma. The narrative revolves around a newly appointed police officer who attempts to curb crime and corruption in his town with the help of his sidekick.

The film was theatrically released in India on 26 July 2019.

== Plot ==
A director meets a producer, and he queries about all elements of a masala film (songs, villain, fights, comedy scenes, etc.) and approves it without even reading the script.

The director insists on reading out the script to him, to which the producer agrees. The script is about Arjun Patiala, who wins the national Judo championship. As a reward, he is offered the post of Sub-Inspector in Punjab Police, and he takes charge of Ferozpur police station, where Onida Singh, a constable, becomes his sidekick. He earns the respect of his colleagues on the first day with his wit and integrity. There is a rendezvous with Baby Narula, and as the director narrates, there is a needless item song inserted for entertainment.

Sometime later, he meets Ritu Randhawa, a journalist, and sparks fly between them. The next day, DSP Amarjeet Singh Gill visits their police station and tells Arjun that a crime-free district is his dream. A local drug lord Baldev Singh Rana thrashes the constable from his station. Ritu expecting ignorance from the police for this incident, reaches the crime spot and berates the police for inaction. Arjun Singh also reaches the place and trashes Baldev, and arrests him. Ritu is impressed, and they start dating.

Arjun Singh meets her in her office and gets information on the crime scene in the district. She explains to him the rivalry between Baladev and Dilbaugh and Sakool, an emerging crime lord.

With limited resources and legal constraints, Arjun decides to instigate a gang war amongst the gangs, which is the only way to eliminate the criminals. He gives Sakool the location of Baladev, and he kills him in the presence of roadside vendors and Arjun Singh. At the media briefing, the police claim that there were no witnesses. Ritu believes that there have to be witnesses because the murder occurred on a busy street, she investigates and smells something fishy. She meets Arjun and expresses her concerns, and asks him to be honest with her. He lies to her that he has no role to play in this. DSP Gill introduces Arjun to MLA Makkad, who also appears to be upright and supports their action.

One by one, all the gangsters are killed except Sakool. Ritu is suspicious of all these gang wars and finally confronts Arjun. She offers him 2 choices, either she investigates all the killings, or they separate, which leads to their break-up. She meets Sakool and tells him about her suspicions, and tries to alert him of his possible death. Sakool tries to kill her because of her intricate knowledge of the crime world & she can become a possible witness to his plan of double-crossing the Police, but somehow she manages to escape.

While following a lead on Ritu's editor, Onida enters the home of Makkad and sees DSP Gill with the editor discussing their plans to take over the vacuum in the criminal world. Realising they are being toyed, he tries to alert Arjun. However, his cover is exposed, and he has to run for his life. The trio (MLA, DSP & editor) visit Arjun Singh, and Makkad gives him an ultimatum to kill Sakool and Onida. She further tells him that she would personally inspect their dead bodies in the morgue. Arjun calls Onida & asks him to meet near a bridge and shoots him in front of Makkad. Later in the day, he calls her to the morgue to inspect the bodies of Sakool & Onida. When she arrives at the morgue, Sakool and Onida shows up alive, and Arjun has double-crossed both Makkad and Sakool. There is a fist fight at the scene, and Arjun is able to escape with DSP Gill and Onida. Sakool and Makkad also escape in the morgue van. Sakool chases Arjun to his ancestral home, and after a long cat and mouse chase, Sakool is shot dead when his father accidentally fires Arjun's gun. Makkad is sent to jail, Arjun and Ritu reconcile, and there is a happy ending as expected of a Masala Film.

== Cast ==
- Diljit Dosanjh as Sub-Inspector Arjun Singh, aka Arjun Patiala
- Kriti Sanon as Reporter Ritu Randhawa
- Varun Sharma as Head Constable Onida Singh
- Ronit Roy as IPS Amarjeet Singh Gill
- Pankaj Tripathi as Producer
- Seema Pahwa as MLA Prapti Makkad
- Mohammed Zeeshan Ayyub as Sakool
- Amit Mehra as Baldev Singh Rana
- Yogesh Upadhyay as Danda
- Biswapati Sarkar as Editor
- Himanshu Kohli as Dilbaugh Singh
- Ritesh Shah as Arjun's father
- Nirmal Rishi as Arjun's mother
- Sumit Gulati as Anda
- Mithilesh Chaturvedi as Abhinav Bhatia Ji
- Ankush Kulshreshtha as Kundan
- Manvendra Tripathi as Dalbir Singh
- Tajender Singh as Gagandeep Mishra
- Pradeep Singh as Ajeet Singh
- Akshay Joshi as Kala Jamun
- Rajeev Tiwari as Doctor
- Jaspal Sandhu as ASI Kartar
- Nikita Grover as Nikki Ahuja
- Bharat Bhatia as Sukhi Bajwa
- Gurmeet Chawla as Jailor
- Sunny Leone as Baby Narula
- Abhishek Banerjee as Director
- Santosh Anand Pandey as PA of Producer
- Kanwalpreet Singh

== Production ==
The story is written by Ritesh Shah.

Principal photography began in February 2018 and ended in July 2018. It was shot in Chandigarh and some areas of Punjab.

== Soundtrack ==
Arjun Patiala

Soundtrack album by Sachin–Jigar, Akash D and Guru Randhawa
- Released: 20 June 2019
- Recorded: 2018–2019
- Genre: Feature film soundtrack
- Length: 16:09
- Language: Hindi
- Label: T-Series

Sachin–Jigar chronology
Stree (2018)	Arjun Patiala (2019)	Made In China (2019)
External audio
- Official Audio Jukebox on YouTube

The music is composed by Sachin–Jigar, Akash D and Guru Randhawa, with lyrics by Guru Randhawa, Priya Saraiya and Akash D.

The first song released was Main Deewana Tera, performed by Guru Randhawa.

Track listing
No.	Title	Lyrics	Music	Singer(s)	Length
1.	"Main Deewana Tera"	Guru Randhawa	Sachin–Jigar, Guru Randhawa	Guru Randhawa, Nikhita Gandhi	3:14
2.	"Crazy Habibi v/s Decent Munda"	Guru Randhawa	Sachin–Jigar	Guru Randhawa, Benny Dayal	3:03
3.	"Dil Todeya"	Guru Randhawa	Sachin–Jigar, Guru Randhawa	Diljit Dosanjh	3:15
4.	"Sachiya Mohabbatan"	Priya Saraiya	Sachin–Jigar	Sachet Tandon	3:31
5.	"Sip Sip"	Akash D	Akash D	Guru Bhullar	2:59
Total length:					16:02

== Marketing and release ==
The film was supposed to open on 13 September 2018 but was first postponed to 3 May 2019, then to 19 July and finally to 26 July.

Dinesh Vijan of Maddock Films has stated that the film won't be released in Pakistan due to the Pulwama Attack that happened in Kashmir, India.

== Reception ==
=== Critical response ===
Ronak Kotecha of The Times of India rated the film 2/5 stars, noting that in the second half, the writing, direction, and execution seemed childish. He felt the music was average except for one number. In concluding, Kotecha wrote, "Spoof comedies can be a tricky affair, and this one is way too underwhelming to tickle your funny bone for full two hours." Jyoti Sharma Bawa of the Hindustan Times gave 1/5 stars and felt that Shah and Leyzell's script failed and the film was lost between 'a parody and just another run-of-the-mill film'. Bawa opined, "Spoof as a genre has rarely been tried in Hindi cinema, and someone needs to crack that egg – heaven knows there is a lot waiting to be explored; Arjun Patiala, alas, isn’t that film." Devesh Sharma reviewing for Filmfare rated the film with 2.5/5 stars, praising the supporting cast of Seema Pahwa, Ronit Roy, and Mohammed Zeeshan Ayyub. He wrote, "More was expected from the film, but it just doesn’t aim high enough ... the ingredients are all there, but the execution isn’t up to mark. The film kind of over-promises but under-delivers."

=== Box office ===
Arjun Patiala had the opening day collection of ₹1.25 crore and the second day collection of ₹1.50 crore, whereas the third day collection was ₹1.75 crores, taking its total opening weekend collection to ₹4.50 crore. The opening week gross of the film was ₹9.18 crore.

As of 8 August 2019, with a gross of ₹7.88 crore in India and ₹1.38 crore overseas, the film has a worldwide gross collection of ₹9.26 crore.
