= Chor Nikal Ke Bhaga =

2023 Indian film by Ajay Singh

- Official release poster
- Directed by: Ajay Singh
- Written by: Siraj Ahmed; Amar Kaushik; Raj Kumar Gupta
- Produced by: Dinesh Vijan; Amar Kaushik
- Starring: Yami Gautam; Sunny Kaushal
- Cinematography: Gianni Giannelli
- Edited by: Charu Thakkar
- Music by: Score: Ketan Sodha; Songs: Vishal Mishra
- Production company: Maddock Films
- Distributed by: Netflix
- Release date: 24 March 2023
- Running time: 110 minutes
- Country: India
- Language: Hindi

Chor Nikal Ke Bhaga (transl. The thief has escaped) is a 2023 Indian Hindi heist thriller film directed Ajay Singh produced by Amar Kaushik. It stars Yami Gautam and Sunny Kaushal in the lead, with Sharad Kelkar, Indraneil Sengupta and Barun Chanda in pivotal roles. The film released on 24 March 2023, directly for streaming, on Netflix.

== Plot ==
In the fictional Middle Eastern city of Al-Barkat, Ankit Sethi owns a diamond insurance company and is heavily in debt after his workers misplace a client's diamonds worth ₹20 crores. On a flight, he meets Neha Grover, a flight attendant, and falls in love with her. They begin dating, and when Neha reveals that she is pregnant, Ankit proposes marriage. Before they can marry, two goons working for his creditor attack them, leaving Neha seriously injured and causing her to miscarry. With no other way to repay his debt, Ankit decides to rob a plane.

He discovers that Minister Harish Sanyal plans to smuggle diamonds from Al-Barkat to India by air. Concealed in a mobile phone casing, the diamonds are kept in a briefcase secured by a code. Ankit arranges a deal with Sanyal's secretary, agreeing to reveal the code in exchange for half the diamonds. Aboard the flight, Neha deliberately spills food on the courier carrying the briefcase, forcing him to visit the washroom. Ankit attempts to steal the diamonds but is interrupted when masked terrorists hijack the plane and take the passengers hostage.

The hijackers demand that the pilots land in Kullu and insist on the release of Adil-Mir, a terrorist imprisoned in Manali. Pretending to suffer from asthma, Ankit asks to retrieve his inhaler from another compartment, hoping to steal the diamonds. One hijacker sees through his deception and beats him. Later, while the hijackers negotiate with government officials in the cockpit, Ankit returns to the compartment, takes the diamonds and hides them in his bag. When a hijacker catches him, Ankit disarms him and fights back, but the other hijackers overpower him and lock him in the washroom. Sudhanshu Roy, claiming to be the Flight Marshal, then picks up a dropped gun and apparently shoots the hijackers dead, allowing the passengers to escape safely.

A bomb attached to Ankit's body is found to be fake. The hijackers' bodies have disappeared, as has Sudhanshu. Investigators discover that the real Flight Marshal, Bhanu Yadav, was unconscious throughout the flight and that Sudhanshu was an impostor. RAW officer Parvez Shaikh arrives with his team to question the passengers. Bhanu recalls drinking orange juice before losing consciousness, while Ankit discovers that the diamonds he stole are fake. It is revealed that Ankit had only pretended to love Neha to enlist her help in robbing the plane.

However, Neha had already discovered his deception after overhearing him speaking to the attackers following her miscarriage. Seeking revenge, she contacted Sudhanshu, an old associate from her father's mafia past, and devised a staged hijacking to steal the diamonds from Ankit. They recruited Jinu, Nikki and Abbas to board the plane as passengers before disguising themselves as hijackers, while Gaffar supplied fake guns. Neha drugged Bhanu's drink, rendering him unconscious. Sudhanshu, posing as the Flight Marshal, replaced the real diamonds with fakes, staged the hijackers' deaths using a blank shot and escaped, while the others blended back into the crowd of passengers.

Neha anonymously contacts Sanyal and forces him to order Parvez to halt the investigation and cover up the incident, threatening to expose his diamond-smuggling operation. The case is closed, and the public is told that a genuine hijacking occurred. Bhanu is celebrated as a national hero for supposedly killing the hijackers. Neha then sends Sanyal a text proving that Ankit received the briefcase code on his phone. Realising that Ankit had tried to steal the diamonds, Sanyal brutally tortures both his secretary and Ankit, who finally understands Neha's revenge. Neha visits Ankit in hospital as he recovers, reveals the truth behind her plan and leaves on a first-class flight.

== Cast ==
- Yami Gautam as Neha Grover
- Sunny Kaushal as Ankit Sethi
- Sharad Kelkar as RAW officer Parvez Shaikh
- Indraneil Sengupta as Sudhanshu Roy
- Barun Chanda as Home Minister Harish Sanyal
- Sunil Palwal as Azhar/Jinu Varghese
- Ajeet Singh as Zaheer/Nikki Ahuja
- Ghanshyam Lalsa as Irfaan/Abbas Ansari
- Krunal Pandit as Bhagat - Minister's Aide
- Priyanka Karunakaran as Vinita Matthew
- Vishal Om Prakash as Inspector Trilok
- Aru Krishansh Verma as Manmeet
- Aashit Chatterjee as Adil Mir
- Shahid Latief as Omar Bin
- Kamaal Malik as Bhanu Yadav
- Robin Das as Gaffar
- Purnendu Bhattacharya as Pilot
- Alex Reece as Carlson}}

== Release ==
The film was released on Netflix on 24 March 2023.

== Music ==
The music for the film is composed by Vishal Mishra.

No.	Title	Lyrics	Singer(s)	Length
1.	"Janiye"	Vishal Mishra	Vishal Mishra, Rashmeet Kaur	3:43

== Reception ==
The film overall received mixed response from critics as well as audience. On the review aggregator website Rotten Tomatoes, 67% of 9 critics' reviews are positive, with an average rating of 5.3/10.

Dhaval Roy of The Times Of India rated the film 3.5 stars out of 5 and wrote "The plotline and the double jeopardy situation of a heist and a hijack make Chor Nikal Ke Bhaga an exciting watch. The story may not seem convincing, and the events often get convenient, but the slick treatment and direction will keep you hooked throughout."

Saibal Chatterjee of NDTV rated the film 2.5 stars out of 5 stars and wrote "Chor Nikal Ke Bhaga, despite its taut and precise screenplay, is at best passable fare. The film takes some time to take off. When it does, it avoids deviations and stays firmly focussed on its course."

Shubhra Gupta for The Indian Express rating the film only 1.5 stars out of 5 wrote "The quick-fire romance between our lead pair leads to hot dates, and rumpled sheets. Having got the preliminaries out of the way, the film dives into its real business, and for a while we stay with it."
