= Shiddat =

2021 Indian film by Kunal Deshmukh

- Official release poster
- Directed by: Kunal Deshmukh
- Written by: Dheeraj Kedarnath Rattan; Pooja Ladha Surti; Shridhar Raghavan
- Story by: Sara Bodinar
- Produced by: Bhushan Kumar; Krishan Kumar; Dinesh Vijan
- Starring: Sunny Kaushal; Radhika Madan; Mohit Raina; Diana Penty
- Cinematography: Amalendu Chaudhary
- Edited by: A. Sreekar Prasad
- Music by: Songs: Sachin–Jigar; Manan Bhardwaj; Gourov Dasgupta; Background Score: Sachin–Jigar
- Production companies: T-Series Films; Maddock Originals
- Distributed by: Disney+ Hotstar
- Release date: 1 October 2021
- Running time: 146 minutes
- Country: India
- Language: Hindi

Shiddat: Journey Beyond Love, or simply Shiddat (transl. Passion), is a 2021 Indian Hindi-language romantic drama film directed by Kunal Deshmukh and produced by Bhushan Kumar, Krishan Kumar and Dinesh Vijan under their banners T-Series and Maddock Films. The film stars Sunny Kaushal, Radhika Madan, Mohit Raina and Diana Penty.

The film premiered on 1 October 2021 on Disney+ Hotstar.

== Plot ==
The film starts with the wedding ceremony of Gautam and Ira, who were fellow mates at a French university. Jaggi, a drunk guest at the wedding, creates a scene and gets caught with his friends for gatecrashing the party.

=== 3 months later ===
Jaggi crosses the border illegally, intending to reach London, but gets caught and taken back to the embassy where Gautam works. Jaggi explains that he has to reach London before Monday to prove his love, after being inspired by Gautam's speech on reception day. The film flashes back to three months ago.

Jaggi, a hockey player, meets Kartika, a swimmer, and though the two get off to a rocky start, they start spending time together and grow close. But Jaggi finds out Kartika is getting married. She asks him to meet her after three months in London, to prove that his love is true, in which case she would cancel the wedding. Jaggi enters the UK illegally and faces many hurdles trying to reach Kartika before her wedding and after falling off a plane Jaggi dies leaving Kartika heartbroken. The film ends with Kartika along with Gautam, Ira and all their friends trying to celebrate Jaggi's life, remembering him.

== Cast ==
- Sunny Kaushal as Joginder "Jaggi" Dhillon
- Radhika Madan as Kartika Singh
- Mohit Raina as Gautam Sehgal
- Diana Penty as Ira Sharma Sehgal
- Arjun Singh as Ketan
- Vidhatri Bandi as Sheena
- Gaurav Amlani as Pinkesh
- Gandharv Dewan as Rana "Rane" Chaudhry
- Chirag Malhotra as Bilal
- Hoomayun as Nazir
- Babraqk Akbari as Tarekh
- Atul Kumar as Rajesh Singh
- Nazneen Madan as Manjari Singhania
- Rajendra Shisatkat as Coach Damle
- Diljohn as Kersie Marfatia
- Floriane Andersen as Natalie
- Eric Mallett as French Shopkeeper

== Production ==
=== Development ===
The film was announced on 16 May 2019 by Dinesh Vijan.

=== Casting ===
Radhika Madan, Sunny Kaushal, Mohit Raina and Diana Penty were signed for the lead roles.

=== Filming ===
Principal photography commenced in November 2019.

== Soundtrack ==
Shiddat

Soundtrack album by Sachin–Jigar, Manan Bhardwaj and Gourov Dasgupta
- Released: 22 September 2021
- Genre: Feature film soundtrack
- Length: 26:38
- Language: Hindi
- Label: T-Series

Official audio
- Shiddat - Full Album on YouTube

The film's music was composed by Sachin–Jigar, Manan Bhardwaj and Gourov Dasgupta while lyrics written by Kausar Munir, Priya Saraiya, Kunwar Juneja and Manan Bhardwaj.

The song "Akhiyan Udeek Diyan" is a remake of a Punjabi qawwali that was originally composed and performed by Nusrat Fateh Ali Khan. The lyrics were written by Khawaja Pervaiz and Nusrat. Although Nusrat had been performing “Akhiyan Udeek Diyan” live since at least 1979, an official studio version was released in 1990. Kohinoor Mukherjee, mixing and mastering engineer received 'Best Mixing Mastering Award' for the song "Hum Dum".

Track listing
No.	Title	Lyrics	Music	Singer(s)	Length
1.	"Shiddat - Title Track"	Manan Bhardwaj	Manan Bhardwaj	Manan Bhardwaj	3:50
2.	"Akhiyan Udeek Diyan"	Manan Bhardwaj, Khawaja Pervaiz, Nusrat Fateh Ali Khan	Nusrat Fateh Ali Khan, Manan Bhardwaj	Master Saleem	4:33
3.	"Barbaadiyan"	Priya Saraiya	Sachin–Jigar	Sachet Tandon, Nikhita Gandhi, Madhubanti Bagchi, Sachin–Jigar	3:50
4.	"Hum Dum"	Kunwar Juneja	Gourov Dasgupta	Ankit Tiwari	5:05
5.	"Chitta"	Manan Bhardwaj, Traditional	Manan Bhardwaj	Manan Bhardwaj	3:48
6.	"Jug Jug Jeeve"	Kausar Munir	Sachin–Jigar	Sachet Tandon, Parampara Tandon, Sachin–Jigar	3:19
7.	"Shiddat" (Reprise)	Manan Bhardwaj	Manan Bhardwaj	Manan Bhardwaj	2:13
Total length:					26:38
