= Mili (2022 film) =

2022 film directed by Mathukutty Xavier

- Theatrical release poster
- Directed by: Mathukutty Xavier
- Screenplay by: Ritesh Shah
- Story by: Mathukutty Xavier
- Based on: Helen by Mathukutty Xavier
- Produced by: Boney Kapoor
- Starring: Janhvi Kapoor; Sunny Kaushal; Manoj Pahwa
- Cinematography: Sunil Karthikeyan
- Edited by: Monisha R. Baldawa
- Music by: A. R. Rahman
- Production companies: Bayview Projects; Zee Studios
- Distributed by: Zee Studios
- Release date: 4 November 2022
- Running time: 127 minutes
- Country: India
- Language: Hindi

Mili is a 2022 Indian Hindi-language survival thriller film directed by Mathukutty Xavier and produced by Bayview Pictures and Zee Studios. The film stars Janhvi Kapoor in the titular role, alongside Sunny Kaushal and Manoj Pahwa. It is a remake of the director's own 2019 Malayalam-language film Helen. The film follows Mili Naudiyal, who gets stuck in a storage freezer and fights to stay alive.

Principal photography took place from August to November 2021 in Mumbai and Dehradun. The film's music was composed by A. R. Rahman with lyrics written by Javed Akhtar. It was distributed by Zee Studios and released theatrically on 4 November 2022. The film received mixed-to-positive reviews from critics but failed at the box office, though Janhvi Kapoor's performance received praise, earning her a nomination for the Filmfare Award for Best Actress.

== Plot ==
Mili Naudiyal is a B.Sc Nursing graduate and attends IELTS coaching classes intended for a job abroad, specifically Canada. She works part-time at a restaurant named Doon's Kitchen, located within a plush mall. Mili lives with her father Niranjan Naudiyal, who is against her going to Canada. Unknown to Niranjan, Mili has a boyfriend Sameer Kumar, who also disagrees with her Canada plans.

One night, while Sameer is taking Mili home by scooter, they are stopped by police who penalise him for drunk driving and not wearing a helmet, and they are brought to the police station. Niranjan gets called into the station as well, and is extremely upset with seeing his daughter with a boy who has committed a crime. He does not talk to her for days. Mili also ends all contact with Sameer. He shows up to her workplace to try and reconcile, but is shut down by Mili.

One night after work, Mili is asked by her co-workers to put some boxes in the storage freezer before she leaves. As she is doing so, she is accidentally locked inside by her manager, Sudheer Malkoti, thinking that no one is inside the restaurant. As the temperature slowly decreases, eventually reaching -18 °C, Mili has to survive in the freezing cold temperature. She tries to block the exhaust fan but ends up dislocating her leg. She starts to get frostbite.

Niranjan starts getting worried that Mili has not reached home as it is getting late. He searches for Mili with the help of his neighbour. They resort to calling all her co-workers, but none of them seem to know anything. Sameer, who was on his way to Delhi half-heartedly for a job, returns after hearing that Mili is missing and also joins the investigation, much to Niranjan's dismay. Niranjan and his neighbour continuously suspect that Sameer knows something that they do not. The search party, which seems to grow by the hour, makes multiple attempts to call the police station and garner help, but are instead met with apathetic responses by Sub-inspector Satish Rawat, who tells them that Mili must have run away with Sameer and to keep looking on their own.

Eventually, the search party gets fed up with the police response they are getting, as is Rawat's partner. They decide to go to the police station to file a case for Mili, and are instead greeted by Rawat, which is when they realise he is the same police officer who arrested Sameer and Mili earlier. He is adamant that Sameer and Mili ran off together and that Sameer is lying. Although he did not believe Sameer's innocence at first, Niranjan tries to defend him, causing tension between Rawat and the search party. Rawat's boss, Inspector Ravi Prasad, arrives at the station, scolding Rawat for his behaviour and reassuring Niranjan and Sameer that they will try their hardest to find Mili. From this point on, Prasad takes over the case.

Meanwhile, Mili is desperately trying to save herself, while her phone is sitting in the restaurant buzzing every few minutes with calls from her father. At some point, Mili finds a mouse, and tries to save its life as well as her own. She starts growing extremely weak, and covers herself in boxes to try and stay warm; the mouse eventually dies from hypothermia.

Rawat, offended and vexed with Prasad and the search party, deliberately tries not to help them. Cyber Cell, the division that handles technology in cases, informs Rawat that the last tower location from Mili's phone was at the mall she works at. Rawat purposely delays informing Prasad about this news.

Sameer suddenly remembers an incident where some auto-drivers that hung out in front of the mall where Mili worked at harassed her one-day, causing Sameer and his friends to beat them up. He tells the search party that it is possible they might have done something to her in retaliation. The search party arrives at the mall to enquire about the auto-drivers, to which the one who harassed Mili denies the allegations, having an alibi.

Feeling defeated and lost, the group meets the watchman of the mall, who says he does not think that Mili left the mall. The group rushes inside the mall, with everyone searching high and low for Mili. Simultaneously, one of the inmates at the police station purposely causes a scene after overhearing Rawat and his partner arguing over the Cyber Cell message. While Rawat is dealing with the inmate, his partner steals his phone, sending the updated news to Prasad.

Just as Niranjan is about to give up, he sees a metal dish drop from a vent in the mall. He grabs the group, and they figure out that the vent leads to the storage freezer in Doon's Kitchen. Quickly, they rush to the freezer to find Mili passed out on the floor, in her last stages of hypothermia. She is taken to the hospital for treatment.

The next day, Mili reunites with her father and Sameer, and is extremely happy to see that the entire situation has brought Sameer and Niranjan closer; they have grown to like and accept one another. Niranjan gives his blessings to Mili and Sameer, and Mili cancels her Canada plans. Meanwhile, Malkoti is warned by Prasad to install an alarm in the storage freezer, or else his restaurant licence will be revoked. The watchman arrives, and Niranjan asks him how he was sure Mili never left the mall. He recalls the fact that he notices her going in and out of the mall every day, because she is the only person who actually smiles at him; he did not see her smile on her way out the day she went missing. When the watchman asks Niranjan what his daughter's name is, he proudly replies, "Mili".

== Cast ==
- Janhvi Kapoor as Mili Naudiyal
  - Khushi Hajare as young Mili
- Sunny Kaushal as Sameer Kumar
- Manoj Pahwa as Niranjan Naudiyal
- Seema Pahwa as Devki Negi
- Jackie Shroff as an inmate (special appearance)
- Hasleen Kaur as Hasleen
- Rajesh Jais as Mohan Chachu
- Vikram Kochhar as Sudheer Malkoti
- Anurag Arora as SI Satish Rawat
- Sanjay Suri as Inspector Ravi Prasad
- Joginder Goyat as Shyam
- Raghav Binani as Ladoo
- Rishad Mahmud as Hridoy

== Production ==
In August 2020, Boney Kapoor bought the rights to remake the Malayalam film Helen (2019) in Hindi. The title of the remake, Mili, was announced a year later. Mathukutty Xavier, the director of the original, was retained for the remake too. He recalled in 2021 that he had refused an offer to remake Helen in Hindi, but when contacted by Kapoor who wanted his daughter Janhvi to star in a potential remake, he agreed. Noble Babu Thomas who portrayed a major role in Helen, served as the remake's creative director. Ritesh Shah was hired as the screenwriter to help adapt the script to suit Hindi-speaking audiences. Ranjith Ambady, the makeup artist from the original, was retained in the same position.

Janhvi portrays the title character, Mili Naudiyal. Sunny Kaushal, who portrays Mili's boyfriend, sought not to imitate Noble Babu Thomas, who portrayed the role in the original, but give his own interpretation. Mathukutty Xavier considered having Boney portray Mili's father, but decided against it as he felt it was "gimmicky" to have one's real father portray their screen father too. The role went to Manoj Pahwa.

Principal photography was supposed to have begun in June 2021, but got delayed due to the second wave of the COVID-19 pandemic in India. It ultimately commenced on 5 August 2021 in Mumbai. The scenes depicting Mili stuck in a storage freezer were shot in an actual storage freezer. These scenes, along with other indoor scenes were filmed in Mumbai, while the scenes depicting the mall where Mili works were filmed in Dehradun due to malls in Mumbai being closed at the time. Janhvi underwent "intense preparation" to portray her character, and said the filming process affected her both "physically and mentally". Filming wrapped on 26 November 2021.

== Soundtrack ==
Mili

Soundtrack album by A. R. Rahman
- Released: 7 November 2022
- Recorded: 2021
- Genre: Feature film soundtrack
- Length: 18:29
- Language: Hindi
- Label: Zee Music Company

A. R. Rahman chronology
Heropanti 2 (2022)	Mili (2022)	Pippa (2023)

Official audio
- Mili – Full Album on YouTube

The music is composed by A. R. Rahman and the lyrics are written by Javed Akhtar. The first single "Sun Aye Mili" was released on 22 October 2022. The second single "Tum Bhi Raahi" was released on 27 October 2022.

Track listing
No.	Title	Singer(s)	Length
1.	"Tum Bhi Raahi"	A. R. Rahman, Shashaa Tirupati	4:15
2.	"Sun Aye Mili"	Vishal Mishra	4:27
3.	"Main Toh Main Hoon"	Abhilasha Sinha	3:47
4.	"Jeena Hoga"	Vishal Mishra	3:41
5.	"Tum Bhi Raahi" (Reprise)	Khatija Rahman	2:19
Total length:			18:29

== Release ==
Mili was released in theatres on 4 November 2022.

=== Home media ===
The film began streaming on Netflix from 30 December 2022.

== Reception ==
On the review aggregator website Rotten Tomatoes, 75% of 12 critics' reviews are positive, with an average rating of 6/10.

Mili received mixed-to-positive reviews from critics, with praise for Kapoor's performance, and mixed reviews from audiences.

Sukanya Verma of Rediff.com rated the film 3.5 out of 5 stars and wrote "Mili establishes Janhvi Kapoor as an actor striving to be taken seriously". Bollywood Hungama rated the film 3 out of 5 stars and termed the film as a "gripping thriller" and also praised the performance of Kapoor. Saibal Chatterjee of NDTV rated the film 3 out of 5 stars and wrote "It has its moments and a pivotal performance that demonstrates that Janhvi Kapoor is an actress who has the chops to carry an entire film on her shoulders". Avinash Lohana of Pinkvilla rated the film 3 out of 5 stars and called the film a "sincere attempt" and also appreciated the performance of Janhvi and the latter half, all combined the film doesn't create a strong impact.

Renuka Vyavahare of The Times of India rated the film 2.5 out of 5 stars and stated "Mili lacks the nerve-wracking, gripping intensity that is most essential to this genre." Shubhra Gupta of The Indian Express rated the film 2 out of 5 stars and wrote "The survival thriller has its moments and Janhvi Kapoor puts in the work. However, the pace slackens and bloat becomes the problem."
