= Gold (2018 film) =

2018 Indian Hindi-language film

- Theatrical release poster
- Directed by: Reema Kagti
- Screenplay by: Reema Kagti
- Dialogues by: Rakesh Devraj
- Story by: Reema Kagti; Rajesh Devraj
- Produced by: Ritesh Sidhwani; Farhan Akhtar
- Starring: Akshay Kumar; Mouni Roy; Kunal Kapoor; Amit Sadh; Vineet K. Singh; Sunny Kaushal; Nikita Dutta
- Cinematography: Álvaro Gutiérrez
- Edited by: Anand Subaya
- Music by: Songs: Sachin–Jigar; Additional Songs: Arko Pravo Mukherjee; Tanishk Bagchi; Background Score: Sachin–Jigar
- Production company: Excel Entertainment
- Distributed by: AA Films
- Release date: 15 August 2018 (India)
- Running time: 151 minutes
- Country: India
- Language: Hindi
- Box office: ₹158 crore

Gold: The Dream That United Our Nation, or simply Gold, is a 2018 Indian Hindi-language period sports film written and directed by Reema Kagti and produced by Farhan Akhtar and Ritesh Sidhwani under their banner Excel Entertainment. The film stars Akshay Kumar, Mouni Roy, Amit Sadh, Kunal Kapoor, Vineet Kumar Singh, Sunny Kaushal and Nikita Dutta.

Gold is based on the journey of India's national hockey team to the 1948 Summer Olympics and follows Tapan Das, the man who won India its first gold medal in the same event. Gold was theatrically released on 15 August 2018 during India's Independence Day. The film grossed ₹158 crore (US$17 million) against a budget of ₹61 crore (US$6.5 million) at the box office. Gold also became the first Bollywood film to be released in Saudi Arabia.

== Plot ==
The story begins around the time of the Berlin Olympics in 1936, when the Indian team played the hockey finals against Germany. Despite the Germans attempting to play rough against the Indian team, the Indians start winning in the second half, when the team's assistant manager, Tapan Das (Akshay Kumar), shows them the Indian Flag during the half time break. When the captain Samrat (Kunal Kapoor) and team receive the gold medal, the British National Anthem is played and the flag of British India is hoisted, but the Indian team promise themselves that they will win a Gold medal once again on behalf of their motherland, after India gets Independence.

The subsequent Olympics are cancelled because of World War II. After the war, a drunk and spoiled Tapan roams and loses in several bets but sobers up when he gets the news that the next Olympics will be held in London in 1948. He holds aspirations of making India play hockey as a free country, coaching a novice hockey team to earn independent India's first Olympic gold medal at the 1948 Summer Olympics.

Tapan now struggles to win his position as a joint manager of the team and promises to bring up best players from the new generation. He manages to convince Mr. Wadia, and goes out for his work back. He meets the former hockey captain Samrat, now retired, to lead to guide the team. But Samrat refuses and suggests teammate Imtiaz Ali Shah (Vineet Kumar Singh). Imtiaz, a great contributor of the 1936 Olympics along with Samrat, was a soldier for the Indian National Army. Tapan meets Imtiaz and they decide to continue their dream and oath to win the gold medal for an independent India. With Independence for India looming on the horizon, Tapan travels to different parts of India to scout for the best players for the team.

Finally Tapan keeps his promise and creates the national hockey team, taking players from several regions. Among them are Thakur Raghubir Pratap Singh (Amit Sadh) and Himmat Singh (Sunny Kaushal), a pair of talented centre forwards from Central India and Punjab.

Meanwhile, India gets Independence, but is also partitioned into India and Pakistan. During a riot, Imtiaz gets injured when some Hindus and Sikhs tried to burn him alive, but is saved by Tapan and Himmat. They reach Imtiaz's house come hockey club, but to their disappointment, his house is burnt and destroyed. A heartbroken Imtiaz refuses to stay further in India and leaves for Lahore. A heartbroken Tapan narrates that along with the division of the country, their dreams and aspirations also broke apart. Half the team ends up playing for Pakistan, while a few others - mainly Anglo-Indians - move to Australia.

Tapan decides to make it on his own, and brings up the team for practice at a small Buddhist School. The head monk of the ashram is convinced because he was a great fan of hockey and Samrat. The team is brought here through Tapan's own money. His wife, Monobina Das (Mouni Roy), also supports and helps him realize his dreams. The training begins but there is a lack of teamwork between the players due to several conflicts. Raghubir, who keeps on his pride, always tries himself to get over the hard working Himmat. On the other hand, Devang Chaturvedi is an efficient player with wit and wisdom. Tapan and Samrat finally teach the players a lesson of unity and conclude the training. Samrat makes Devang, the captain, Raghubir, the vice Captain and tells Tapan that Himmat is a hidden treasure to be used at the right time of the Olympics.

Mr. Wadia, as a chairperson of the Hockey Council, becomes the Head Coach and Tapan is once again honoured as the assistant manager of the team. A jealous Mehta (Atul Kale) deceives Tapan by mixing some alcohol in his drink and an intoxicated Tapan behaves very badly in the party organized by the Hockey Council and is fired from his position, being replaced by Mehta.

The team is now brought to the Olympic level in London by Mehta, But Mehta's usual ego and pride brings upon his bad image to the players when they complain against him. Mr. Wadia then sends for Tapan, and Tapan comes to London with the blessing of Mr. Wadia, who himself returned there from New York. The Olympics begin but Himmat is not allowed to play.

India plays well to reach and win the semi-finals. But since he is not in the player list, Himmat thinks it is a conspiracy by Raghubir just to let him down. During a celebration, Himmat starts fighting with Raghubir and a conflict grows between them, which tarnishes Himmat's image. Devang and Raghubir try to explain to Himmat that it was Tapan who selected the player list for the game, but all in vain.

Finally, in the semi-finals, Tapan has listed Himmat to play, but since other players had complained against his behaviour the previous night, Himmat is not allowed to play. Tapan explains the reason that in the league matches, the opponent players mark the good players, and in the semi-finals or finals, they have marked making it difficult for them to play well. Although India wins the semi-finals, it turns a hard match.

In the finals, during the first half against Great Britain, Himmat is benched again, and Great Britain scores 2 goals. During half time in the Indian dressing room Tapan has a heated argument with Mehta about the need of Himmat's playing when Mehta refuses to change the team at the last minute. Tapan shows everyone the Indian Flag and tells them he has been carrying it since Berlin Olympics to see his dream come true. He leaves the room telling Raghubir that if he doesen't understand the unity of team now it will be too late for him.

Then after, the second half starts Himmat is seen playing and then scores a goal with the help of Raghubir. Although bad weather conditions seemed in favor of the British, Tapan asks everyone to open their shoe to maintain grip on the ground. Finally India wins the match at 4–3 with Himmat scoring the last minute goal.

Finally, when the captain, Devang receives the gold medal, the National Flag of independent India is hoisted and the anthem "Jana Gana Mana" is played. A proud Tapan concludes the narration with the words "Vande Mataram" (Victory to Mother India) as the anthem ends and tears of happiness take place.

== Cast ==
- Akshay Kumar as Tapan Das (based on Pankaj Gupta)
- Mouni Roy as Monobina Das, Tapan's wife
- Kunal Kapoor as Samrat, a character inspired by Dhyan Chand
- Amit Sadh as Raghubir Pratap Singh, a character inspired by K. D. Singh
- Vineet Kumar Singh as Imtiaz Ali Shah, a character inspired by Ali Dara
- Sunny Kaushal as Himmat Singh, a character inspired by Balbir Singh Sr.
- Nikita Dutta as Simran
- Ivan Rodrigues as Sports Official
- Andrew Havill as Sir James Benson
- Lakshya Kochhar as Suryakant Pant
- Udaybir Sandhu as Devang Chaturvedi
- Bhawsheel Singh Sahni as Tej Singh Randhawa
- Abdul Quadir Amin as Haries
- Varun Singh Rajput as Aasim Bilal
- Pravin Jaiswal as Basheer Ahmed
- Atul Kale as Mr. Mehta
- Darius Shroff as Mr. Wadia
- Tejaswi Dev Chaudhary as Langford Adam, a character inspired by Leslie Claudius
- Scarlett Mellish Wilson as item number "Monobina"

== Production ==
=== Development ===
Gold was officially announced in October 2016 by Akshay Kumar, who was confirmed to play the leading role in a film written and directed by Reema Kagti and produced by Ritesh Sidhwani and Farhan Akhtar under Excel Entertainment, marking his maiden collaboration with Kagti, Sidhwani and Akhtar; Kumar was originally approached to star in Akhtar's 2006 remake of his father's 1978 film Don, but it did not materialize. Arjuna Award winner and former Indian national hockey team captain Sandeep Singh was signed to train the actors to improve their hockey skills. According to Kagti, the film is "a fictional take on what happened. Also, it is not just the golden victory in 1948 we will be looking at, but it will encompass 12 crucial years in India’s history." Akhtar was originally considered to play a supporting part in the film, but declined.

=== Filming ===
Principal photography began on 1 July 2017 in Bradford, England. The shooting of the film was carried out in Yorkshire at Bradford, Doncaster and Rotherham. After finishing the England schedule, production moved to Punjab in September 2017 for the second schedule in which shooting was conducted in Amritsar and Patiala. Some parts of the film were also shot in New Egerton Woolen Mills, Dhariwal a town in Punjab. The reason was the British infrastructure in the long established mill which resembled the post independence era. The final schedule of the film was completed in Mumbai in December 2017. On 10 December 2017, Kumar announced that filming had been completed.

== Soundtrack ==
Gold

Soundtrack album by Sachin–Jigar, Arko Pravo Mukherjee and Tanishk Bagchi
- Released: 23 July 2018
- Recorded: 2017–2018
- Genre: Feature film soundtrack
- Length: 25:27
- Language: Hindi
- Label: Zee Music Company
External audio
- Official Audio Jukebox on YouTube

Sachin–Jigar chronology
Parmanu: The Story of Pokhran (2018)	Gold (2018)	Stree (2018)

Arko Pravo Mukherjee chronology
Daas Dev (2018)	Gold (2018)	Satyameva Jayate (2018)

Tanishk Bagchi chronology
Fanney Khan (2018)	Gold (2018)	Satyameva Jayate (2018)

Singles from Gold
- 1. "Naino Ne Baandhi" Released: 6 June 2018; 2. "Chad Gayi Hai" Released: 30 June 2018; 3. "Ghar Layenge Gold" Released: 14 July 2018

The music and background score of the film were composed by Sachin–Jigar. Additional songs were composed by Arko Pravo Mukherjee and Tanishk Bagchi. The lyrics were written by Javed Akhtar, Vayu and Arko Pravo Mukherjee.

Track listing
No.	Title	Lyrics	Music	Singer(s)	Length
1.	"Naino Ne Baandhi"	Arko	Arko	Yasser Desai	4:01
2.	"Chad Gayi Hai"	Vayu	Sachin–Jigar	Vishal Dadlani, Sachin–Jigar	3:05
3.	"Ghar Layenge Gold"	Javed Akhtar	Sachin–Jigar	Daler Mehndi, Sachin–Jigar	3:23
4.	"Monobina"	Vayu	Tanishk Bagchi	Yasser Desai, Monali Thakur, Shashaa Tirupati, Farhad Bhiwandiwala	3:36
5.	"Khel Khel Mein"	Javed Akhtar	Sachin–Jigar	K. K., Sachin–Jigar	3:12
6.	"Rasta Rasta"	Javed Akhtar	Sachin–Jigar	Sukhwinder Singh, Sachin–Jigar	3:03
7.	"Jaaga Hindustan"	Javed Akhtar	Sachin Jigar	Divya Kumar, Sachin–Jigar	5:07
Total length:					25:27

== Release ==
In India, the film released on 15 August 2018 with 3040 screens, including IMAX, to coincide with the India's Independence Day and also clashing with Satyameva Jayate.

After having been released in India, Gold was released in China on 13 December 2019. It was banned by the Pakistan Central Board of Film Censors for apprehensions regarding the depiction of the 1947 partition.

=== Marketing ===
Some Emoji were launched on Twitter to promote the movie which worked by applying hashtag before specific keywords like #GoldMovie or #Gold2018. These emojis were effective until 16 August 2018.

== Reception ==
=== Box office ===
In India, Gold's advance booking collection was ₹13.25 crore. The film netted ₹25.25 crore on its opening day, becoming one of the year's biggest opening day releases. As it released on the day of Wednesday, it had a 5 days extended weekend, in which it netted ₹71.10 crore in India. The extended 9 days week nett collection of the film was ₹89.30 crore. By the end of its third week, Gold had netted ₹108 crore at the domestic box office. It netted ₹109.58 crore in full theatrical run in India.The film had a gross collection of ₹141.04 crore domestically.
