= Akhiyan Udeek Diyan (Qawwali) =

Qawwali performed by Nusrat Fateh Ali Khan

Song by Nusrat Fateh Ali Khan
- Language: Punjabi
- Released: 1982
- Recorded: 1979
- Genre: Qawwali
- Label: Oriental Star Agencies
- Composer: Nusrat Fateh Ali Khan
- Lyricists: Khawaja Pervaiz; Nusrat Fateh Ali Khan

"Akhiyan Udeek Diyan" (Punjabi: اکھیاں اڈیک دیاں transl. "My eyes yearn to see you") is a Punjabi qawwali that was originally composed and performed by Ustad Nusrat Fateh Ali Khan. The lyrics were penned by Khawaja Pervaiz and Nusrat Fateh Ali Khan. Nusrat began performing Akhiyan Udeek Diyan in the late 1970s. One of Nusrat's earliest documented live renditions of Akhiyan Udeek Diyan occurred during his 1979 UK tour, where it featured in a medley. That performance was recorded and later released in 1982 on VHS by Oriental Star Agencies Ltd, a British-based Asian music label. Although Akhiyan Udeek Diyan had been part of Nusrat's live repertoire since the late 1970s, a studio version was recorded and released in 1990 on the album Nusrat Fateh Ali Khan, Vol. 3. Subsequently, a live recording appeared as the title track on the 1993 album Akhiyan Udeek Diyan, Vol. 31. The enduring popularity of Akhiyan Udeek Diyan has inspired many artists to create their own cover versions, remakes, and reinterpretations across genres. Notable examples include Nusrat's nephew Rahat Fateh Ali Khan, who maintained the traditional qawwali style; an acoustic take by Asfar Hussain, Rizwan Butt, and Hamza Tanveer featured on Nescafe Basement Season 2 in 2016; and a film version by Master Saleem for the 2021 Bollywood movie Shiddat.

== Description ==
Akhiyan Udeek Diyan can be interpreted as a romantic lament of earthly love and separation between two human beings, or as a classic Islamic Sufi expression of the soul's yearning for divine union. On a romantic level, the qawwali conveys the heartache of a person who is desperately waiting for their beloved partner who has left or traveled far away (the "pardesiya"). It describes how every part of their being is filled with the constant, aching memory of the beloved, making life feel empty and pointless without them ("sada jeeuna kere chaj da ae" – what is the point of living anymore?). The refrain “akhiyan udeek diyan, dil vajaan marda" (my eyes yearn to see you, my heart is calling out to you) together with urgent entreaties like "chetti aaja dholna" (come back quickly, my sweetheart) express the pain of separation in a human relationship.

In the Sufi interpretation, the lyrics transcend earthly romance to become a metaphor for the devotee's spiritual journey. The “beloved” symbolizes Allah (God), the Divine Beloved, while the intense pain of separation is the devotee's experience of feeling separated from Allah in this worldly existence. In Islamic Sufi terminology, this love for Allah is known as Ishq-e-Haqiqi (real or true love), the highest and purest form of love directed solely towards God. The pleas to "come back home" and "come back quickly" are heartfelt cries for the ultimate spiritual return, and reunion with Allah. Through this lens, the qawwali invites listeners to embrace the Sufi truth that the deepest pain of separation from Allah is also the sweetest path leading back to Him.
