= The Forgotten Army – Azaadi Ke Liye =

Indian web television series by Kabir Khan

- Promotional poster
- Created by: Kabir Khan
- Written by: Kabir Khan; Heeraz Marfatia; Shubhra Swarup
- Directed by: Kabir Khan
- Starring: Sunny Kaushal; Sharvari
- Narrated by: Shah Rukh Khan
- Theme music composer: Pritam
- Composers: Julius Packiam; Joel Crasto
- Country of origin: India
- Original language: Hindi
- No. of seasons: 1
- No. of episodes: 5

Production
- Executive producers: Kabir Khan; Rajan Kapoor
- Production location: India
- Cinematography: Aseem Mishra
- Editors: Peter Alderliesten; Rameshwar S. Bhagat
- Running time: 30–45 Minutes
- Production company: Kabir Khan Films Pvt. Ltd

Original release
- Network: Amazon Prime Video
- Release: 24 January 2020

The Forgotten Army – Azaadi Ke Liye is a television series which premiered on Amazon Prime Video on 24 January 2020. The series is directed by Kabir Khan, and is based on true events about the men and women in the Indian National Army (INA) led by Subhash Chandra Bose. The series stars Sunny Kaushal and Sharvari. Kabir Khan made his directorial debut with a documentary titled The Forgotten Army in 1999 which was aired by Doordarshan; and during a promotional talk, Kabir Khan said the current series is a project that is 20 years in the making, based on his initial documentary. The shooting took place in locations such as Thailand, Singapore, Malaysia and Mumbai.

== Synopsis ==
The Forgotten Army – Azaadi Ke Liye, is based on the true story of Indian soldiers allied with the Japanese army, who marched towards the capital, with the war cry 'Challo Dilli' (lit. 'March on Delhi'), to gain Indian independence from colonial rule. The Indian National Army (INA), which was born out of Indian soldiers who defected to the Empire of Japan during WWII to fight against allied forces, was led by Subhash Chandra Bose and had the first women's infantry regiment since the Russian units of 1917–1918. While these soldiers (consisting of both men and women) fought against all odds to gain India its independence, their struggle and story somehow got lost and they became 'the forgotten army'. With the love story between two soldiers – Sodhi and Maya at the heart of it, the series raises several questions about identity, independence and the idea of motherland and the cost of freedom. Freedom, that is often taken for granted but freedom that costs countless lives and sacrifices. Fighting to keep freedom alive is often more difficult than fighting to gain freedom.

== Cast ==
- Sunny Kaushal as Lieutenant (when in the British Indian Army)/Captain (when in the Indian National Army) Surinder Sodhi
  - M. K. Raina as Old Surinder Sodhi,near end scene he died after shootout with Myanmar soldier's for protect Amar friends
- Sharvari as Maya Srinivasan
- Rohit Chaudhary as Arshad
- TJ Bhanu Parvathimurthy as Rasamma
- Karanvir Malhotra as Amar
- R Badree as Rajan
- Paloma Monnappa as Rani
- Shruti Seth as Captain Lakshmi Swaminathan
- Akhil Iyer as Shridhar
- Toshiji Takeshima as Daichi
- Amala Akkineni as Maya's mother
- Nizhalgal Ravi as Maya's father
- Kajol Muskan as a woman soldier (drill commander)
- Junichi Kajioka as Lieutenant General Iwaichi Fujiwara
- Bijou Thaangjam as Japanese soldier

== Critical reception ==
The New Indian Express writes that the series is filled with heartfelt nationalism but falls short on depth. Pratishruti Ganguly writes in the Firstpost that the short series has good performances by numerous actors as well as excellent camera-work, both contributing to a worthwhile cinematic experience.

== See also ==
- List of World War II television series
- Fourteenth Army (United Kingdom), 1943-1945 Commonwealth military formation known as the Forgotten Army
