= Sthree =

Sthree may refer to:

- SThree, an international recruitment business
- Sthree (film), a 1950 Indian Malayalam-language film directed by R. Velappan Nair

== See also ==
- Stree (disambiguation)
