= Makdee =

2002 Indian film by Vishal Bhardwaj

- Directed by: Vishal Bhardwaj
- Screenplay by: Vishal Bhardwaj
- Story by: Vishal Bhardwaj
- Produced by: Vishal Bhardwaj
- Starring: Shabana Azmi; Makrand Deshpande; Shweta Basu Prasad
- Cinematography: Hemant Chaturvedi
- Edited by: Aarif Sheikh
- Music by: Vishal Bhardwaj
- Distributed by: Percept Picture Company
- Release date: 22 November 2002
- Country: India
- Language: Hindi

Makdee (English: Spider), promoted as The Web Of The Witch, in English, is a 2002 Indian comedy horror film written and directed by Vishal Bhardwaj. It stars Shabana Azmi, Makrand Deshpande, Shweta Basu Prasad and Alaap Mazgaonkar. The film tells the story of a young girl in north India and her encounter with an alleged witch in an old mansion in the locality, believed by the locals to be haunted. It also explains the belief in witches and witchcraft across modern day India. The film was screened in the Critics' Week (Spotlight on India) section at the 2003 Cannes Film Festival.

When the film society and distributors were initially unsure about the film, Shailendra Singh believed in the director and the film. Percept Pictures backed the film, giving Vishal his directorial debut in Bollywood and proving that films made for children could be successful.

== Plot ==
Life in Chunni's village is peaceful. She fools the villagers, including her parents, with her impersonation of her twin sister, Munni.

In the village, there is a mansion that is said to be haunted, and legend goes that a witch called Makdee (Shabana Azmi) resides there. The legend has it that whoever wanders into the mansion comes out as an animal. No one in the village dares to enter the mansion.

Things are going fine for Chunni until the day one of her pranks gets quite out of hand. Chunni, her sister, and her friend Mughal-e-azam are constantly at odds with the local butcher, Kallu (Makarand Deshpande). Once Kallu chases Munni, Chunni's docile twin, to the mansion, mistaking her for Chunni in a fit of rage. As a result of this, Munni, her docile sister, enters the mansion, where presumably the witch has turned the little girl into a hen. Chunni is hysterical when she discovers this. She runs from pillar to post to get help, but her credibility is at an all-time low and the entire village refuses to believe her, so Chunni finally enters the haunted mansion alone to search for her sister.

In the mansion she comes face to face with the witch, she pleads with the witch to let her little sister go. The witch asks her to strike a deal. She will turn Munni back into a human only if Chunni can acquire for her hundred hens in exchange.

Chunni's schoolmaster visits the mansion, but a small puppy is seen exiting the mansion, and people presume the witch has turned him into a puppy. Mughal-e-azam after spotting the puppy, realizes it is his pet dog that had entered the mansion and has disappeared ever since. It's then Chunni realises that all this was just a ruse. Makdee is not a witch, and she does not really turn humans into animals; she merely locks them up and has some plans of her own. She is actually a conwoman who has been looking for a treasure that has been hidden in the village, and so she abducts many children to dig up the place to find the treasure. She is accompanied by those two policemen who are actually helping in her plan all the way.

However, as soon as Chunni finds the treasure, the conwoman traps everyone, including the policemen, in an attempt to flee the village. She is confronted by Kallu, who enters her mansion looking for the children. The kids and other people beat up the policemen for their notoriety and helped Chunni stop the conwoman. The conwoman and Kallu are engaged in a brief fight before Chunni shows up and traps the woman in a similar way that she did to all the people. The conwoman falls into her own trap and gets beaten by the children. All the people locked up are finally freed, and the village finds a new hero in Chunni.

== Cast ==
- Shweta Basu Prasad as Chunni/Munni (double role)
- Shabana Azmi as Makdee, the witch
- Makrand Deshpande as Kallu, the village butcher
- Daya Shankar Pandey as schoolteacher
- Aalap Mazgaonkar as Mughal-e-Azam
- Mohini Mathur as Dadi

== Awards ==
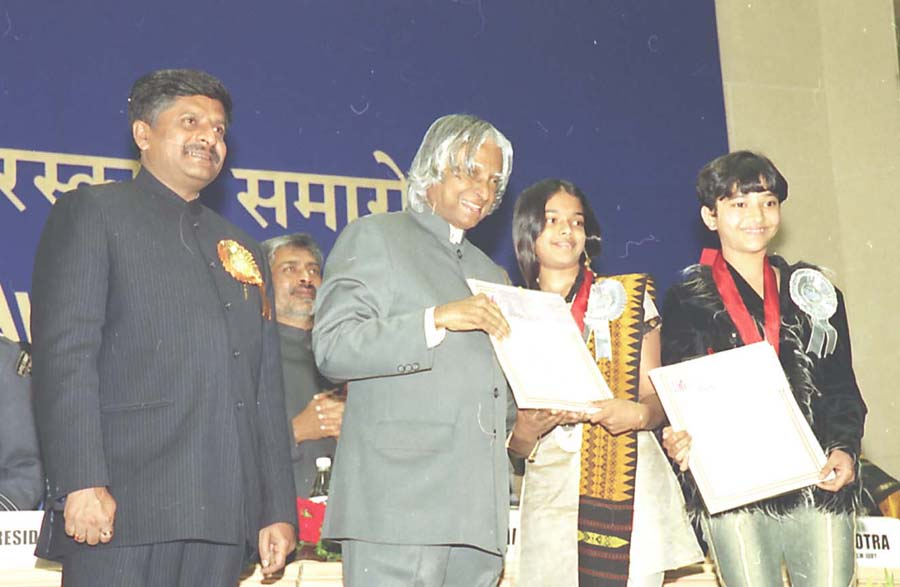
The President Dr. A.P.J. Abdul Kalam presenting the Best Child Artist Award for the year 2002 to Shweta Prasad for her role performance in this film (along with, P. S. Keerthana for Kannathil Muthamittal ) at the 50th National Film Awards

- Shweta Basu Prasad won the Indian National Film Award for Best Child Artist for 2003 for her role in the film.
- The film won the second prize at the Chicago International Children's Film Festival.
