= Sunny Kaushal =

Indian actor (born 1989)

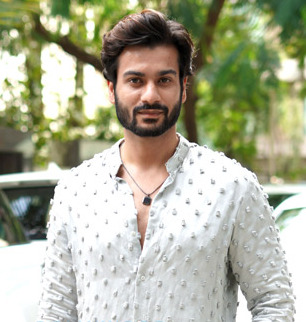
- Kaushal in 2022
- Born: 28 September 1989 (age 37); Bombay, Maharashtra, India
- Occupation: Actor
- Years active: 2016–present
- Relatives: Kaushal family

Sunny Kaushal (born 28 September 1989) is an Indian actor who works in Hindi films. Born into the Kaushal family, he worked as an assistant director on the films My Friend Pinto (2011) and Gunday (2014). He made his acting debut in the comedy-drama Sunshine Music Tours and Travels (2016), and gained recognition for his supporting part in the sports biopic Gold (2018). Kaushal has since starred in the streaming series The Forgotten Army - Azaadi Ke Liye (2020) and films Shiddat (2021), Chor Nikal Ke Bhaga (2023), and Phir Aayi Hasseen Dillruba (2024).

== Early life ==
Kaushal was born on 28 September 1989 in a suburban chawl in Mumbai to Sham Kaushal, an action director in Indian films and Veena Kaushal. His older brother is actor Vicky Kaushal. His family is Punjabi. Kaushal initially enrolled at The Institute of Chartered Accountants of India but later dropped out to pursue acting. He then started his acting career playing small roles in theatre plays and skits.

== Career ==
Kaushal made his Bollywood debut by playing the leading role in the 2016 comedy-drama road film Sunshine Music Tours and Travels and the TV Mini-Series Official Chukyagiri. He was also part of the short film Love at First Sight.

In 2018, Kaushal featured in Reema Kagti's period sports film Gold which is based on the national hockey team's title at the 1948 Summer Olympics. He portrayed the role of Himmat Singh, a character inspired by Balbir Singh Sr. For his role in Gold, he received critical recognition and also received a nomination at the 25th Screen Awards for Best Supporting Actor. That same year, he appeared in the TV Mini-Series Official CEOgiri, a spin-off of the 2016 series Official Chukyagiri. The short film The Embrace in which Kaushal plays the role of Siddharth was nominated in the Drama Short Film category at the Filmfare Awards.

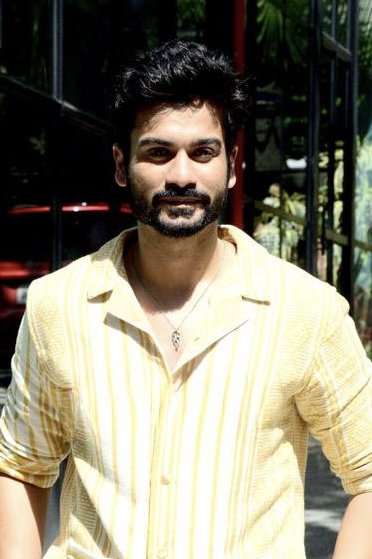
Kaushal promoting Shiddat in 2021

Kaushal's next was the dance based film Bhangra Paa Le alongside Rukshar Dhillon which released on 3 January 2020 in selected screens. Later that same year, Kaushal headlined Amazon Prime Video's original series The Forgotten Army - Azaadi Ke Liye. The series was directed by Kabir Khan based on true events of the Indian National Army fight for Indian Independence during World War II. The New Indian Express found his performance to be "splendid".

A year later, he starred in the romantic drama film Shiddat where he played the role of Jaggi Dil, a man who desperately tries to reach London to be with his love who is going to marry another man. After being indefinitely delayed due to the COVID-19 pandemic, the film premiered on 1 October 2021 on Disney+ Hotstar. Samriddhi Srivastava of India Today commented: "Kaushal’s dialogue deliveries and convincing performance will win your heart".

In 2022, Kaushal featured alongside Nushrratt Bharuccha and Vijay Varma in Hurdang, a love story set in the backdrop of the student agitation of 1990 in Allahabad. Then he was seen in the survival film Mili alongside Janhvi Kapoor and Manoj Pahwa.

In 2023, he featured opposite Yami Gautam in the Netflix suspense thriller film Chor Nikal Ke Bhaaga. He was then seen in the romantic thriller sequel Phir Aayi Hasseen Dillruba, alongside Taapsee Pannu and Vikrant Massey.

== In the media ==
Kaushal was ranked in The Times Most Desirable Men at number 45 in 2018 and at No. 38 in 2019.

== Filmography ==
=== Films ===
Key
†	Denotes films that have not yet been released

Year	Title	Role	Notes	Ref.
2011	My Friend Pinto	—N/a	Assistant director	
2014	Gunday	—N/a	Assistant director	
2016	Sunshine Music Tours and Travels	Sunburn		
2017	Love At First Sight	Kshitij	Short film	
2018	Gold	Himmat Singh		
2019	The Embrace	Siddharth	Short film	
2020	Bhangra Paa Le	Jaggi Singh / Kaptaan Singh (Note: Kaushal played dual roles in the film.)		
2021	Shiddat	Joginder "Jaggi" Dhillon		
2022	Hurdang	Daddu Thakur		
2022	Mili	Sameer		
2023	Chor Nikal Ke Bhaga	Ankit Sethi		
2024	Phir Aayi Hasseen Dillruba	Abhimanyu Pandit		
2026	Letters To Mr. Khanna†	Sunsunny Khez	Completed	

=== Television ===
Year	Title	Role	Ref.
2016	Official Chukyagiri	Spandan Chukya	
2018	Official CEOgiri	Spandan Chukya	
2020	The Forgotten Army - Azaadi Ke Liye	Lieutenant / Captain Surinder Sodhi (Note: Lieutenant, when in the British Indian Army and Captain, when in the Indian National Army.)	

=== Music video appearances ===
Year	Title	Singer(s)	Ref.
2020	"Taaron Ke Shehar"	Neha Kakkar, Jubin Nautiyal	
2021	"Dil Lauta Do"	Payal Dev, Jubin Nautiyal	
2021	"Ishq Mein"	Meet Bros, Sachet Tandon	
2024	"Mukke Paaye Si"	B Praak	
2025	"Jaana Nahi"	Faheem Abdullah	
2025	"Mid-Air Freeverse"	Himself as SunSunnyKhez	

== Discography ==
Year	Title	Album	Co-singer	Composer	Ref.
2023	"Jhandey"	Non-album single	—N/a	Himself and Bharg	
2025	"Mid-Air Freeverse"	Non-album single	—N/a	Himself, UpsideDown, ICONYK	

== Awards and nominations ==
Year	Award	Category	Film	Result	Ref.
2018	Screen Awards	Best Supporting Actor	Gold	Nominated	
2024	Bollywood Hungama OTT India Fest	Best Actor Male – Web Original Film	Phir Aayi Hasseen Dillruba	Won	
2025	Iconic Gold Awards	Best Actor Negative - OTT	Phir Aayi Hasseen Dillruba	Won	
2025	IIFA Digital Awards	Best Supporting Actor – Film	Phir Aayi Hasseen Dillruba	Nominated	
