= Sunburn Festival =

EDM Music Festival In India

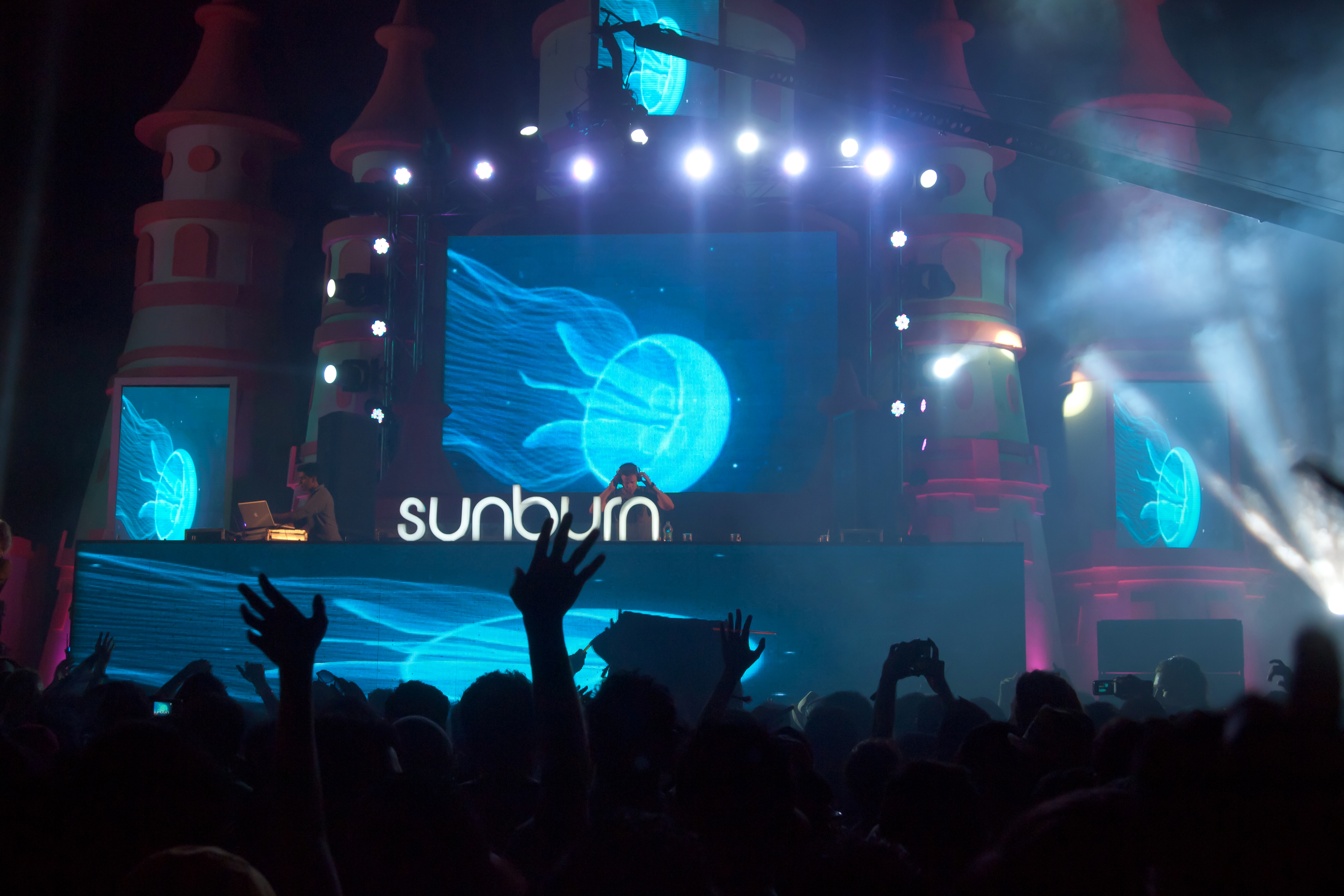
- Sunburn Festival in Candolim, Goa in 2010
- Genre: Electronic dance music
- Dates: Last Weekend/3 Days Of The Year
- Location: Vagator, Goa (2007–2015); Pune, Maharashtra (2016–2018); Vagator, Goa (2019–2024) Mumbai, Maharashtra (2025)
- Years active: 2007–present
- Participants: Armin Van Buuren, Above & Beyond, Ferry Corsten, Axwell, Shapeshifters, Sander Van Doorn
- Website: sunburn.in

Sunburn Festival is a commercial electronic dance music festival held in India. It was started by entrepreneur Shailendra Singh of Percept Ltd.

Spanning over three to five days, the festival has multiple stages with artists playing simultaneously. It was held annually in Vagator, Goa from 2007 to 2015, and shifted to Pune, Maharashtra in 2016. In 2019, the festival returned to Vagator, Goa.

According to a 2014 International Music Summit report, Sunburn was "as big as Tomorrowland and Ultra". It was ranked by CNN in 2009 as one of the Top 10 Festivals in the world.

In 2011, Percept Ltd launched the Sunburn Arena, featuring Avicii, at the Turf Club in Mumbai. In 2012, Percept launched Sunburn City Festival, Sunburn Campus and Sunburn Reload, as well as their first international festival, Sunburn Colombo. Over the years Sunburn has expanded internationally and has included many well known DJs, including Swedish House Mafia, Martin Garrix, Hardwell, David Guetta, Axwell, Dimitri Vegas and Like Mike, Paul Van Dyk, Marshmello, Chainsmokers, Afrojack, Pete Tong, Tiesto, Armin van Buren, DeadMau5, Carl Cox, DJ Snake, Skazi.

== History ==
Electronic music parties and similar festivals have been held in Goa, with the late 1980s seeing the start of free parties, events that included DJs, art, crafts and food stalls. This continued through 1990s to early 2000s at beaches such as Vagator Beach, Anjuna beach and Arambol beach.

As of 2023, there have been 17 editions of the festival.

=== 2007 (Goa) ===
In 2007, Shailendra Singh organized the first Sunburn as an international dance music festival. It took place on 28 and 29 December at Candolim Beach, Goa. Performers included Carl Cox, Above & Beyond and Axwell as headline acts. Held on two stages, with DJs playing simultaneously, other acts included John 00 Fleming, Pete Gooding, DJ Pearl, Jalebee Cartel, Super 8 & Tab. The festival was hosted by Nikhil Chinapa and Rohit Barker.

=== 2008 (Goa) ===
Sunburn Goa 2008 was themed Electric Circus and was held on two main stages: one for Trance acts and one for House music. Having tied up with Defected Records in 2008, the label brought house DJs Simon Dunmore, Shapeshifters, Copyright and percussionist Shovel playing. Headlining the festival were GMS, Gareth Emery and John 00 Fleming. The acts were Digital Blonde, Roger Shah, DJ Pearl, Brute Force, Nawed Khan, Vachan Chinnappa, Jalebee Cartel, Sanjay Dutta, and Ma Faiza. The event took place from 27 to 29 December at Candolim Beach.

=== 2010 (Goa) ===
Sunburn Goa 2010 took place from 27 to 29 December at Candolim Beach. Sunburn passes went live on 5 November with the early bird passes and pre-booking sale passes being sold out in 22 minutes. The headliners of the 2010 festival were Paul Van Dyk, Ferry Corsten and Axwell along with Sultan & Ned Shepard with Nadia Ali, Richard Durand, GMS, Pete Gooding, Aly & Fila and DJs Pearl, Ma Faiza, Anish Sood and Sanjay Dutta.

For the 2010 festival, Percept ran a "Sunburn Anthem Contest" for potential audio and visual producers, with participants in the visual category.

=== 2013 (Goa) ===
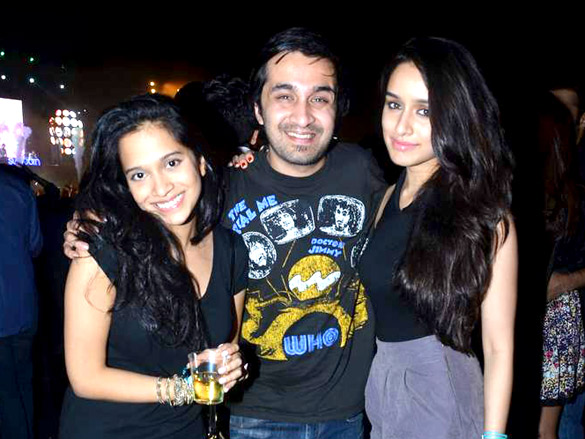
Shraddha Kapoor and Siddhanth Kapoor in Sunburn Goa 2013

The 7th Edition of Sunburn took place in Vagator. This event had 7 stages and around 120 artists across 200 hours. Headline DJs were Afrojack, Axwell, Pete Tong, Ummet Ozcan.

=== 2015 (Goa) ===
The 9th edition was a 4-day event at Vagator, Goa. On 20 November 2015 Sunburn Goa's international ticketing partner, Viagogo, announced that the festival has become one of the largest international music festivals in Asia, The artist lineup would have 120 artists, including Sam Feldt, KYGO, Seth Troxler, Dimitri Vegas & Like Mike, Martin Garrix, DJ SMITH, Kshmr, David Guetta, Dyro, Felix Jaehn, Zaeden and Art Department.

== Sunburn concerts in colleges ==
Multiple colleges across the country have hosted music festivals associated with Sunburn. These events are often part of the college's annual festivals, usually called Sunburn Campus.

== Gallery ==
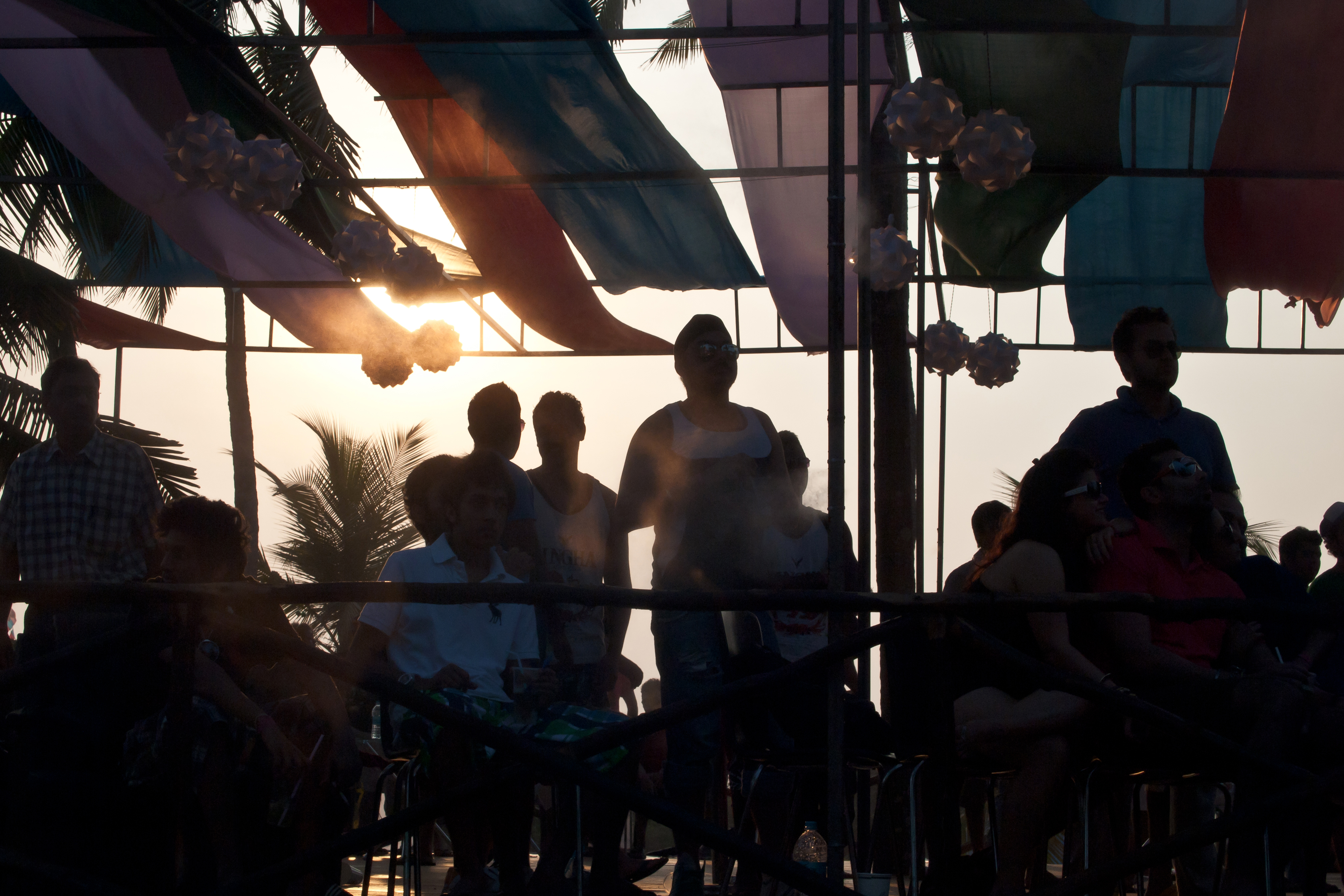

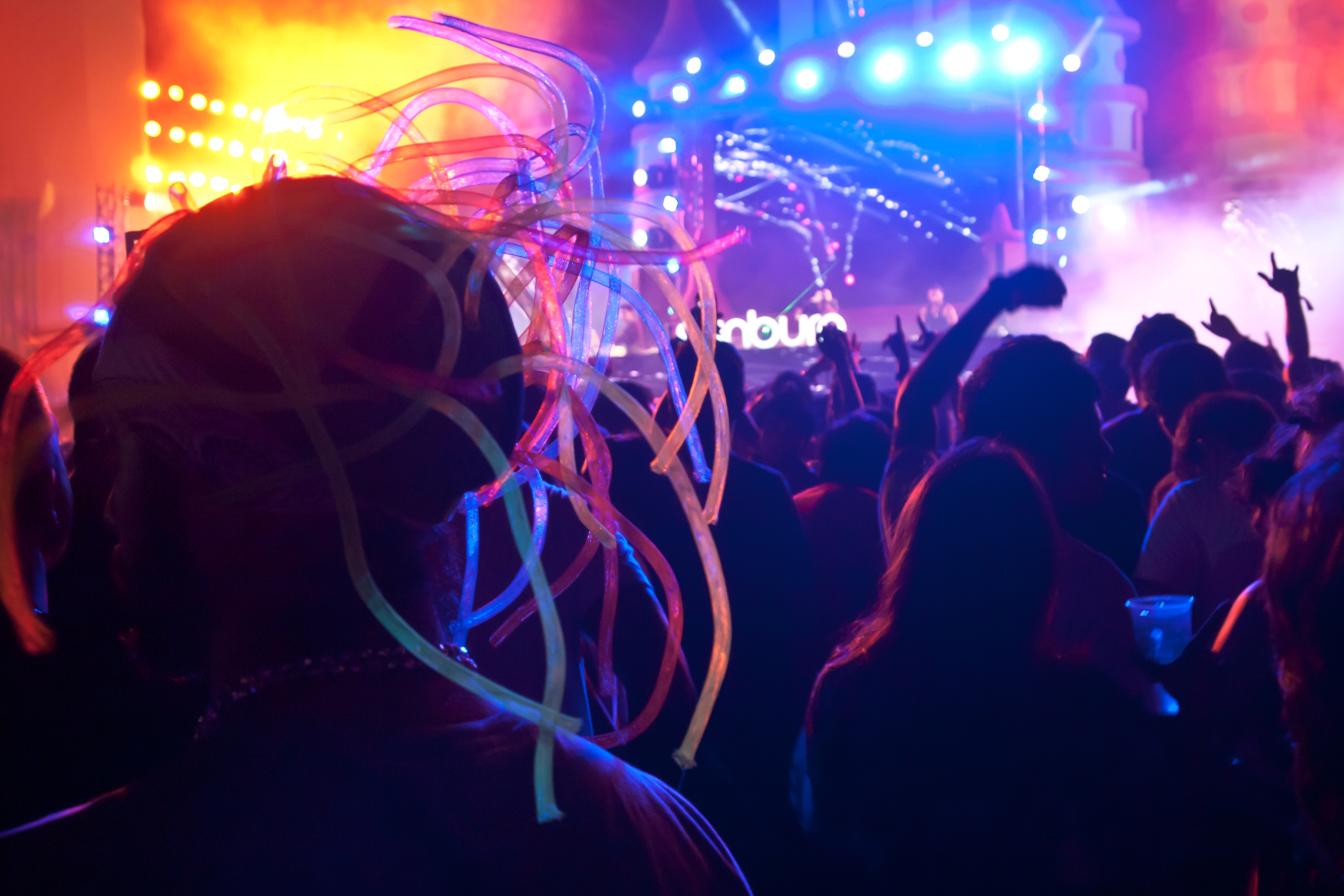

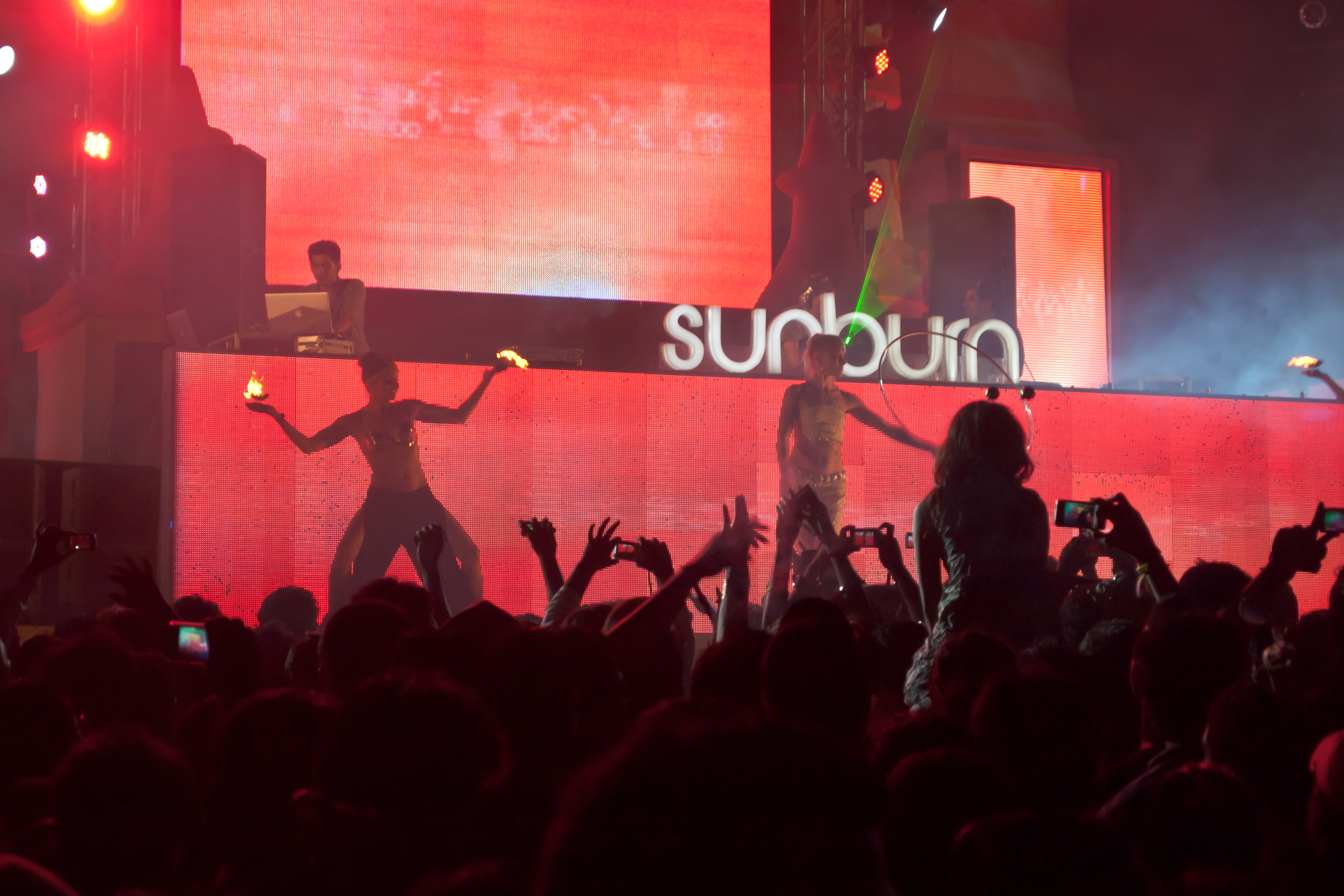

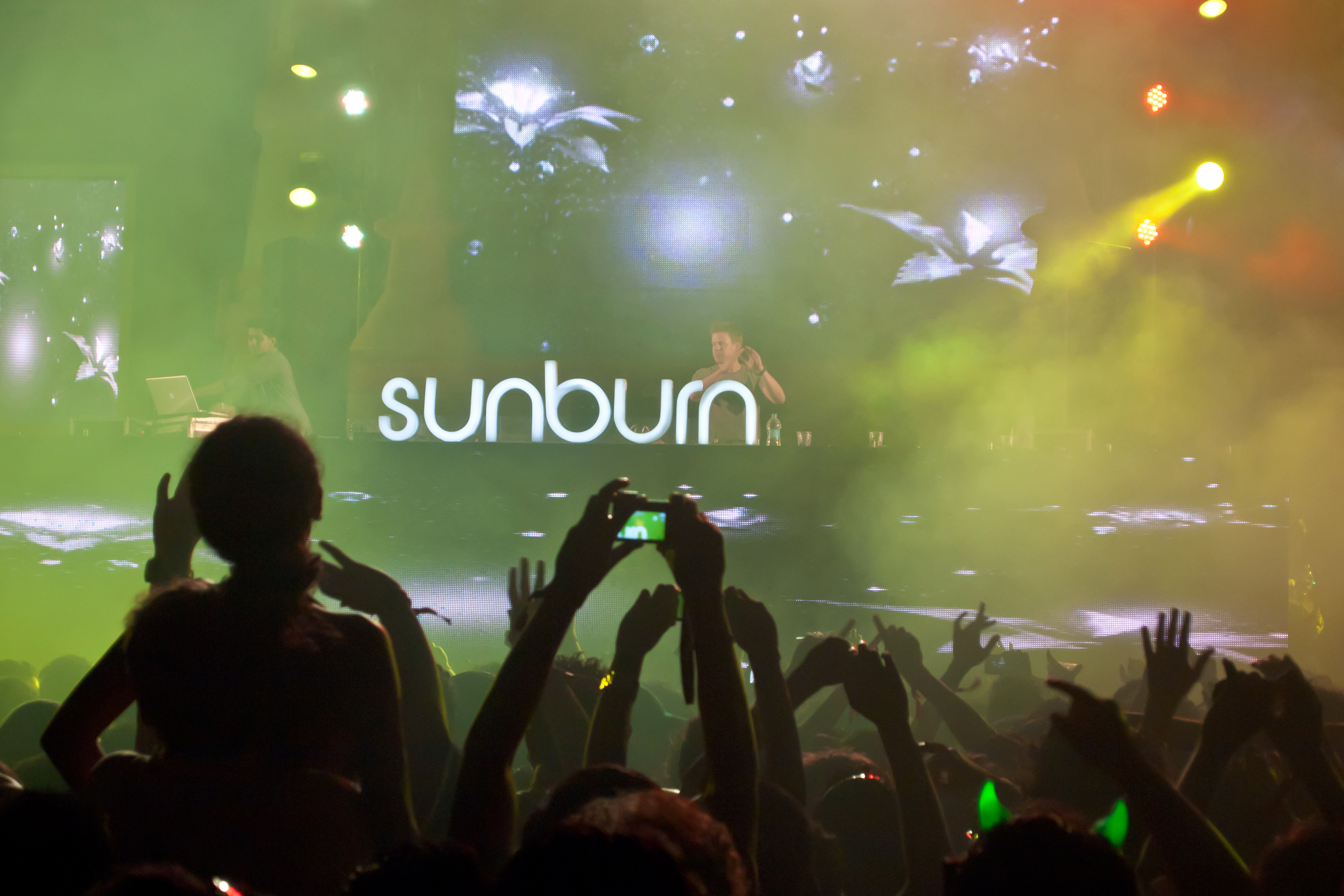

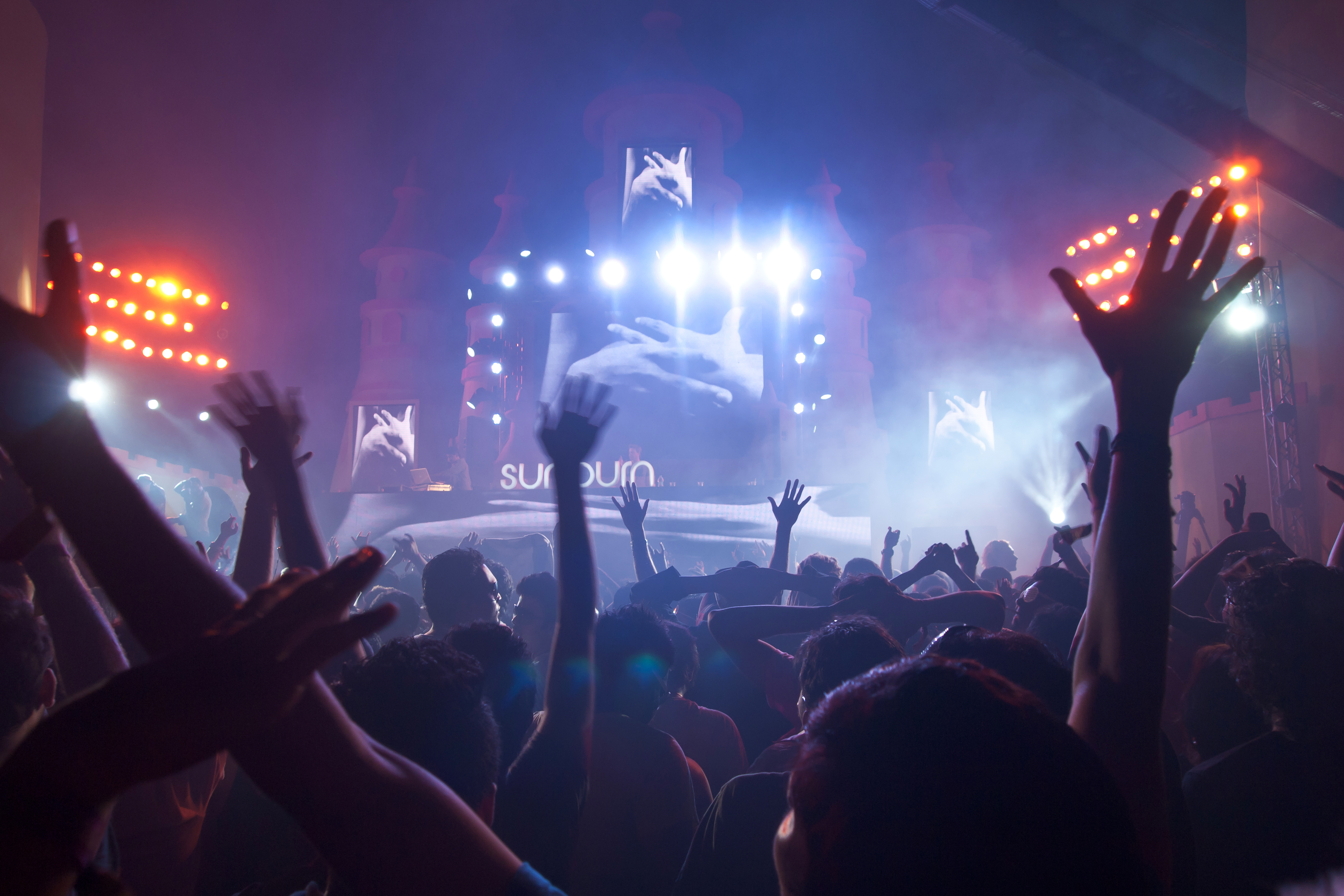

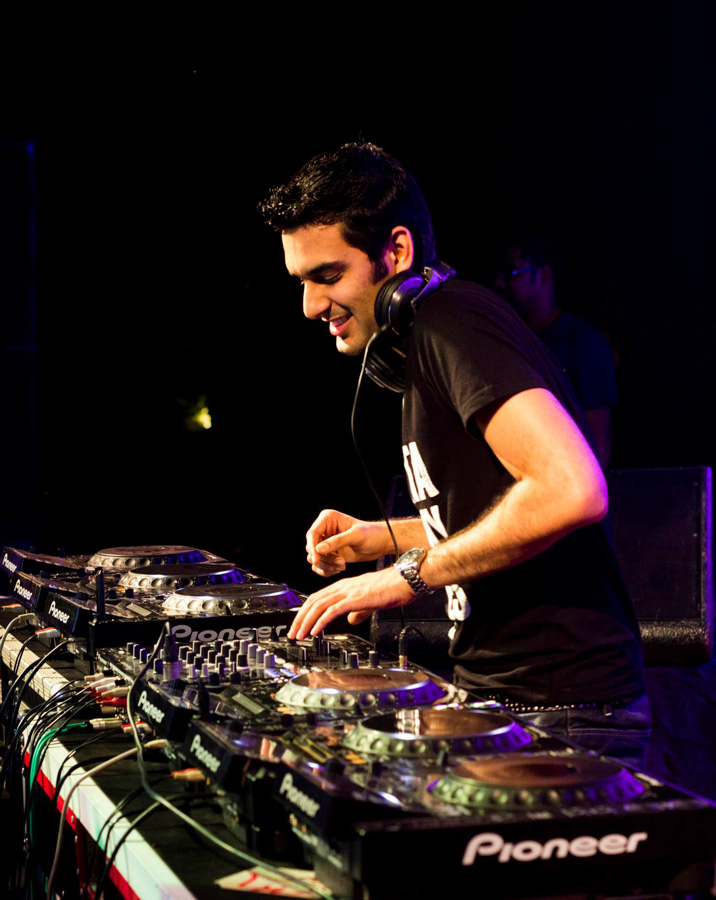

== See also ==
- List of electronic music festivals
- Music festival
