= Stree (soundtrack) =

- Soundtrack album cover

Soundtrack album by Sachin–Jigar
- Released: 17 August 2018
- Recorded: 2018
- Genre: Feature film soundtrack
- Length: 14:28
- Language: Hindi
- Label: T-Series

Sachin–Jigar chronology
Gold (2018)	Stree (2018)	Arjun Patiala (2019)
External audio
- Official Audio Jukebox on YouTube

Stree is the soundtrack album to the 2018 comedy horror film of the same name directed by debutant Amar Kaushik and produced by Dinesh Vijan and Raj & DK, starring Shraddha Kapoor and Rajkummar Rao , alongside Pankaj Tripathi, Aparshakti Khurana and Abhishek Banerjee. The film's soundtrack featured five songs composed by Sachin–Jigar and lyrics written by Vayu, Badshah and Jigar Saraiya. The soundtrack was released under the T-Series label on 17 August 2018.

== Development ==
Sachin–Jigar composed the film's soundtrack, after his previous associations with Vijan and Raj & DK helped them to be involved in the film. Being the sole composer of the film, the duo contributed nearly five songs which consisted of romantic, dance and peppy numbers, that blended traditional folk and modern instrumentation. The lyrics are written by Vayu except for one song "Aao Kabhi Haveli Pe" which is written by Badshah and Jigar Saraiya. Ketan Sodha composed the film score, where he included an extract of the theme song from Mission: Impossible (1996), with an Indian instrumentation in a comedic way.

== Release ==
The first single "Milegi Milegi" was released as a music video on 2 August 2018. The song is set in a royal courtroom sequence where Tripathi is seen as a king who orders for a performance in his durbar, and Shraddha being the main performer, who lures Rao with black magic to dance with her. According to Shaheen Irani of Deccan Chronicle, Rao's actions in the song reminded of Saif Ali Khan in the song "Pyaar Ka Pungi" from Agent Vinod (2012). The second single "Kamariya" was released on 9 August, with an accompanying music video featuring Nora Fatehi in an item number. The second song "Nazar Naa Lag Jaaye" was released on 14 August, that depicted the relationship between Rao and Shraddha. The song "Aao Kabhi Haveli Pe" which featured Kriti Sanon in a special appearance was released on 18 August.

The soundtrack album comprising four tracks, was released on 17 August 2018 under the T-Series label. Additionally, an extra song titled "Dil Ka Darzi" was released by Maddock Films. This song, which was not part of the official jukebox, was included in the film's title credits and was intended for Rao's character, a ladies' tailor. Written by Vayu, it saw him perform vocals alongside Prakriti Kakar, and was later reused in an introductory song in the sequel.

== Reception ==
Vipin Nair of The Hindu rated the soundtrack two-and-a-half out of five stars, noting that it is entertaining but familiar. Debarati S. Sen from The Times of India stated in her review that the album is likely to "appeal to the masses". Devansh Sharma of Firstpost summarized "The eccentric music and lyrics of Stree distract you well enough for you to miss out on a lone lurking figure, that waits for you to turn around as you sway to the inviting beats." Anish Mohanty of Planet Bollywood wrote "Stree is a very good album that is bound to get more popular with time." Swarup Chakravarthy of BollySpice wrote "With such a short album with punchy songs, the music doesn’t really get a chance to flourish."

== Track listing ==
Stree (Original Motion Picture Soundtrack) track listing
No.	Title	Lyrics	Singer(s)	Length
1.	"Milegi Milegi"	Vayu	Mika Singh, Sachin–Jigar	2:33
2.	"Kamariya"	Vayu	Aastha Gill, Divya Kumar, Sachin–Jigar	3:08
3.	"Nazar Na Lag Jaaye"	Vayu	Ash King, Sachin–Jigar	3:26
4.	"Aao Kabhi Haveli Pe"	Badshah, Jigar Saraiya	Badshah, Nikhita Gandhi, Sachin–Jigar	2:53
5.	"Dil Ka Darzi"	Vayu	Raftaar, Neha Bhasin	2.28
Total length:				14:28
