= Hanuman (2005 film) =

2005 Indian animated feature film

- Directed by: V. G. Samant
- Written by: Milind Ukey; Sulekha Bajpai; Shantanu Ganesh Rode
- Produced by: Mahesh Ramanathan; Shailendra Singh
- Starring: Mukesh Khanna
- Edited by: Huzefa Lokhandwala
- Music by: Tapas Relia
- Production companies: Silvertoons; Percept Picture Company
- Distributed by: Sahara One Motion Pictures
- Release date: 21 October 2005 (India)
- Running time: 99 minutes (Official version); 149 minutes (Alternate version)
- Country: India
- Language: Hindi
- Budget: ₹3.25 crore
- Box office: ₹11.68 crore

Hanuman (Note: also marketed as Hanuman: The Mighty Warrior.) is a 2005 Indian Hindi-language animated feature film directed by V. G. Samant and produced by Percept Picture Company and Silvertoons. The animated film dramatizes the life of its title character, Hanuman, a Hindu deity. The animation was provided by Silvertoons.

The film popularised animation and kickstarted the growth of India's animation industry. At the International Indian Film Academy Awards, the film won an award for "A Special Award for Innovation in Indian Cinema". The Telugu dubbed version was titled as Hanuman - Jai Bajarangabali and a game was released as part of the film's promotional strategy.

== Plot ==
This animated movie depicts Hanuman's life from birth. The narrator is actor Mukesh Khanna. The movie relays how Hanuman was born to Anjani (a female apsara) and Kesari with the blessings of Vayu, the Wind God. Hanuman, who is the 11th Rudra incarnation of Shiva, was blessed with supreme intelligence, strength, and divine powers. As a baby, Hanuman was quite naughty and used his powers to pester the saints living in the nearby forest. Once when he was hungry, he leapt to catch the sun thinking it was a fruit.

On the insistence of Vayu, Indra and the other gods came together to bless Hanuman with immortal life. Hanuman's blessings include: no fear or harm from the Brahmastra; no harm could befall him from weapons, fire, or water. He could overcome death, and he could transform his body to take the smallest form or attain the biggest form of life. Blessed with divine powers, Hanuman grew up to be powerful. He helped Rama and Lakshmana in their search for Sita. Hanuman burned the golden city of Lanka and with his superpowers, helped Rama and Lakshmana defeat Ravana and secure the release of Sita. Seeing his devotion and love towards him, Rama blessed Hanuman with the boon of immortality.

== Voice cast ==
- Mukesh Khanna as Hanuman
  - Chiranjeevi in Telugu version
- Viraj Adhav as Rama and Vishnu
- Sumit Pathak as Lakshmana
- Mona Shetty as Sita
- Manoj Pandey as Meghanada / Kesari / a demon working for Ravana
- Rajesh Jolly as Ravana
- Amar Babaria as Angada
- Sanjeev Jaiswal as Bali
- Shahnawaz Pradhan as Sugriva
- Manish Wadhwa as Indra/A street performer (Shiva in disguise)
- Anup Shukla as Vayu
- Tirthankar Mitra as Maruti
- Kumar Pravesh as Dasharatha
- Shailendra Pandey as Surya
- Chand Dhar as Brahma
- Saurabh Agarwal as Kubera
- Sandeep Karnik as Akshaya Kumara/Varuna
- Sanket Jaiswal as Narada
- Sushmita Mukherjee as Surasa
- Pinky Rajput as Anjani
- Kishore Bhatt as Shiva
- Anju Jamwal as Parvati
- Vinod Kulkarni as Sampati
- Parminder Ghumman as Kumbhakarna
- Pawan Shukla as Vibhishana
  - Anil Datt in the alternate version

== Soundtrack ==
Soundtrack was composed by Tapas Relia. The Telugu dubbed version lyrics were written by Veturi. The audio rights for the film were bagged by Times Music, marking their foray into the Telugu industry. Allu Arjun attended the audio launch of the Telugu version as the chief guest.

- "Mahabali Maharudra" - Vijay Prakash, Sonu Nigam, Shaan, Palash Sen, Kailash Kher, Madhushree, Sneha Pant
- "Akadam Bakadam Dekho Yeh Tikadam" - Shravan
- "Hanumaan Chalisa" - Vijay Prakash, Rashmi, Nandini Srikar
- "Jai Hanuman Gyan Gun Sagar" - Shankar Mahadevan, Kailash Kher
- "Jai Bajrangbali" - Palash Sen, Kinshuk Sen
- "Bridge Across The Ocean" - Vijay Prakash
- "Destroying The Ashok Vatika" - Vijay Prakash
- "Kumbhkaran" - Vijay Prakash

== Business ==
Percept entertained in to a merchandising deal with Kishore Biyani's Future Group, valued at ₹3.7 crore, with merchandise being sold exclusively, pan-India, at Big Bazaar.

== Successor ==
A companion film, Hanuman Returns (later retitled Return of Hanuman), was released on 28 December 2007. The sequel project was helmed by director Anurag Kashyap and produced by Shailendra Singh and Percept Pictures.

A third film called, Return of Ravan, was announced by Shailendra Singh in 2013, but has yet to be completed.

== See also ==
- List of indian animated feature films
