= Percept Picture Company =

Indian film production company

Percept Picture Company is an Indian film production company, established in 2002 and a division of Percept Limited, an entertainment, media and communications company based in Mumbai. It has produced films like Dhol, MP3: Mera Pehla Pehla Pyaar, Malamaal Weekly, Hanuman, Yahaan, and Pyaar Mein Twist.

In 2007, it joined hands with Music giant T-Series to co-produce a minimum of 5 films in the year 2007–2008. In Feb 2009, company's COO Navin Shah, announced its plans to invest Rs 100 crore in a new movie production banner christened 'Percept Horrotainment'.

== Filmography ==
- Pyaar Mein Kabhi Kabhi (1999)
- Phir Milenge (2004)
- Yahaan (2005)
- Pyaar Mein Twist (2005)
- Hanuman (2005)
- Home Delivery: Aapko... Ghar Tak (2005)
- Malamaal Weekly (2006)
- Sacred Evil – A True Story (2006)
- Dor (2006)
- Traffic Signal (2007)
- MP3: Mera Pehla Pehla Pyaar (2007)
- Dhol (2007)
- Return of Hanuman (2007)
- Jannat (2008)
- Khuda Kay Liye (2008) (Indian distribution only)
- Ugly Aur Pagli (2008)
- Ru Ba Ru (2008)
- Ramchand Pakistani (2008)
- Hello (2008)
- Jumbo (2008)
- Kanchivaram (2009)
- Firaaq (2009)
- 8 x 10 Tasveer (2009)
- Jail (2009)
- Raat Gayi, Baat Gayi? (2009)
- The New Adventures of Hanuman (2009)
- Bumm Bumm Bole (2010)
- Aashayein (2010)
- Allah Ke Banday (2010)
- Kamaal Dhamaal Malamaal (2012)
- Rush (2012)
- Bhopal: A Prayer for Rain (2014)
- Sabki Bajegi Band (2015)
- Sunshine Music Tours and Travels (2016)
- Hanuman: Da' Damdaar (2017)
- Akka Kuruvi (2022)
