= Baaghi (film series) =

Indian film series

- First film logo
- Directed by: Sabbir Khan (Baaghi); Ahmed Khan (Baaghi 2, Baaghi 3); A. Harsha (Baaghi 4)
- Produced by: Sajid Nadiadwala
- Starring: Tiger Shroff
- Production company: Nadiadwala Grandson Entertainment
- Distributed by: UTV Motion Pictures (1); Fox Star Studios (2,3); Pen Studios (4)
- Release dates: 29 April 2016 (Baaghi); 30 March 2018 (Baaghi 2); 6 March 2020 (Baaghi 3); 5 September 2025 (Baaghi 4)
- Running time: 133 minutes (Baaghi); 137 minutes (Baaghi 2); 143 minutes (Baaghi 3); 157 minutes (Baaghi 4)

Baaghi is an Indian action film series produced by Sajid Nadiadwala under Nadiadwala Grandson Entertainment. The protagonist of the series is portrayed by Tiger Shroff. The first film in the series, Baaghi, was released in 2016 and directed by Sabbir Khan, followed by its sequels, Baaghi 2 (2018) and Baaghi 3 (2020), both directed by Ahmed Khan. Baaghi 4 was released in 2025 and directed by A. Harsha. Baaghi 2 is the most successful film in the series to date, grossing over ₹250 crore worldwide.

== Films ==
Film	Release date	Director	Cast	Screenwriter(s)	Based on	Producer(s)	Installment(s)	Note(s)
Baaghi	29 April 2016	Sabbir Khan	Tiger Shroff, Shraddha Kapoor, Sudheer Babu, Sunil Grover	Sanjeev Datta	Varsham (2004) by Sobhan	Sajid Nadiadwala	First Installment	Baaghi film series
Baaghi 2	30 March 2018	Ahmed Khan	Tiger Shroff, Disha Patani, Prateik Babbar, Manoj Bajpayee, Randeep Hooda	Ahmed Khan, Abbas Hierapurwala, Niraj Kumar Mishra	Kshanam (2016) by Ravikanth Perepu	Sajid Nadiadwala	Second Installment	Baaghi film series
Baaghi 3	6 March 2020	Ahmed Khan	Tiger Shroff, Shraddha Kapoor, Ankita Lokhande, Riteish Deshmukh, Jackie Shroff, Ashutosh Rana	Farhad Samji, Sparsh Khetarpal, Tasha Bhambra, Madhur Sharma, Sajid Nadiadwala	Vettai (2012) by N. Lingusamy	Sajid Nadiadwala	Third Installment	Baaghi film series
Baaghi 4	5 September 2025	A. Harsha	Tiger Shroff, Harnaaz Kaur Sandhu, Sonam Bajwa, Sanjay Dutt	Sajid Nadiadwala, Rajat Arora	Ainthu Ainthu Ainthu (2013) by Sasi	Sajid Nadiadwala	Fourth and Final Installment	Baaghi film series

=== Baaghi (2016 film) ===
Baaghi is the 2016 Hindi remake of the 2004 Telugu film Varsham, with a climax inspired by the 2011 Indonesian film The Raid: Redemption. It stars Tiger Shroff and Shraddha Kapoor in the lead roles and Sudheer Babu in his Hindi debut, with Sunil Grover in a supporting role. Baaghi was released worldwide on 29 April 2016. Made on a budget of ₹370 million (US$3.8 million), the film earned over ₹1.27 billion (US$13 million) worldwide.

Ronny is an skilled martial artist. He faces his challenge when he goes to Thailand to save the woman he loves. His mission puts him directly in front of a world champion artist. That martial artist is also his enemy.

=== Baaghi 2 (2018 film) ===
Baaghi 2 (2018) is the second installment in this series. It stars Tiger Shroff as the titular protagonist with Disha Patani in the lead role. It is a remake of the 2016 Telugu mystery film Kshanam. Baaghi 2 was released worldwide on 30 March 2018 including 3500 screens in India. Although the action sequences and the cast performances received praise, the film was criticized for its inconsistent script and direction. The film grossed over ₹2.53 billion (US$26 million) worldwide to become the third highest-grossing Bollywood film of 2018.

Ronnie, an Indian Army officer, is contacted by his former girlfriend Neha, who asks for his helps in finding her missing daughter. He travels to Goa and begins investigating the disappearance, encountering criminals, drugs traffickers and other connected to the case. As his investigation progresses, Ronnie becomes involved in a series of violent confrontations while uncovering the circumstances surrounding the child's disappearance.

=== Baaghi 3 (2020 film) ===
A sequel, Baaghi 3, was commissioned after the success of the previous film and was also directed by Ahmed Khan, with both Tiger and Shraddha reprising their roles and Sunit Morarjee in a cameo role. The core plot of the film is based on the 2012 Tamil film Vettai. The film co-stars Jaideep Ahlawat, Vijay Varma, Jameel Khoury and Disha Patani, who played the female lead in the previous film, makes a special appearance in the song "Do You Love Me". The action sequences were choreographed by Ram Chella, Lakshman Chella, and Kecha Khampadkee.Baaghi 3 was theatrically released in India on 6 March 2020. The film's collections were affected by the COVID-19 pandemic as the theatres were shut down. There were plans for a re-release once the outbreak would end, but the makers instead decided to release it on digital platforms. The film became the second highest grossing Bollywood film of 2020.

=== Baaghi 4 (2025 film) ===
Before the film was announced, Ahmed Khan said: "The owner of the film is Sajid Nadiadwala. If he decides that we should go ahead with Baaghi 4 we will do it. But we will keep the franchise alive definitely". While interacting with Bollywood Hungama, Tiger Shroff said: "You know I have gotten so many messages and so many calls from people who've said they have unfortunately missed Baaghi 3, because of the situation in the world. They were really etching to see but could not, because of all that was happening. So, the only thing on my mind right now is Baaghi 3, and as you said, I hope they re-release the film. If not, then Baaghi 4 is definitely on the cards". Shroff announced on social media that Sanjay Dutt would be the main antagonist for the fourth movie. The film was announced in November 2024 and was theatrically released on 5 September 2025.

Ronnie returns in Baaghi 4 with a darker and more intense mission. This time, he is recruited by a covert international agency to stop a global terror network threatening world peace. As Ronnie travels across countries while thinking about his past life, he faces deadly assassins, cyber terrorists, and a ruthless antagonist played by Sanjay Dutt. The film blends large-scale action with emotional depth, exploring Ronnie's inner turmoil as he fights for justice.

Directed by A. Harsha in his Hindi directorial debut, the film features Tiger Shroff reprising his role as Ronnie, alongside Sonam Bajwa and Harnaaz Sandhu. The film promised to push the franchise into a more gritty and global narrative. A first look poster released in November 2024 showed Ronnie bloodied and battle-worn, signaling the franchise's darkest chapter yet.

== Recurring cast and characters ==
This table lists the main characters who appear in the Baaghi Franchise.

List indicator
- A dark grey cell indicates the character was not in the film.

Actor/Actress	Film			
Actor/Actress	Baaghi (2016)	Baaghi 2 (2018)	Baaghi 3 (2020)	Baaghi 4 (2025)
Tiger Shroff	Ranveer Pratap Singh aka Ronnie aka Ranveer Charan Chaturvedi			
Shraddha Kapoor	Siya Khurana		Siya Nandan Chaturvedi	
Shaurya Bhardwaj	Guruswami	Colonel Ranjit Singh Walia	Chacha Ji	
Sudheer Babu	Raghav Shetty			
Sunil Grover	Paresh Prakash "PP" Khurana			
Sanjay Mishra	Harry			
Disha Patani		Neha Rawat Salgaonkar		
Manoj Bajpayee		DIG Ajay Shergill		
Randeep Hooda		ACP Loha Singh Dhull "LSD"		
Deepak Dobriyal		Usman Langda		
Prateik Babbar		Sunny Salgaonkar		
Sunit Morarjee		Inspector Sharad Kute	Inspector Sharad Kute	Inspector Sharad Kute
Arravya Sharma		Rhea Pratap Singh		
Riteish Deshmukh			Vikram Charan Chaturvedi	
Ankita Lokhande			Ruchi Nandan Chaturvedi	
Jaideep Ahlawat			Inder Paheli Lamba (IPL)	
Vijay Varma			Akhtar Lahori	
Sanjay Dutt				Chacko
Shreyas Talpade				Jeetendra "Jeetu" Pratap Singh
Saurabh Sachdeva				Paulo
Sheeba Akashdeep Sabir				Catherine
Sonam Bajwa				Olivia / Prathistha
Harnaaz Sandhu				Alisha & Avantika (dual role)
Mahesh Thakur				Dr. Anand Pal Singh
Item Number		Jacqueline Fernandez	Disha Patani	Sonam Bajwa & Harnaaz Sandhu

== Additional crew and production details ==
Occupation	Film			
Occupation	Baaghi (2016)	Baaghi 2 (2018)	Baaghi 3 (2020)	Baaghi 4 (2025)
Director	Sabbir Khan	Ahmed Khan	Ahmed Khan	A. Harsha
Producer	Sajid Nadiadwala	Sajid Nadiadwala	Sajid Nadiadwala	Sajid Nadiadwala
Screenplay	Sanjeev Datta	Ahmed Khan; Shaan Yadav; Abbas Hierapurwala; Niraj Kumar Mishra	Farhad Samji; Sparsh Khetarpal; Tasha Bhambra; Madhur Sharma	Sajid Nadiadwala; Rajat Arora
Story	Sanjeev Datta	Sajid Nadiadwala	Sajid Nadiadwala	Sajid Nadiadwala
Cinematography	Binod Pradhan	Santhana Krishnan Ravichandran	Santhana Krishnan Ravichandran	Swamy J. Gowda
Editor	Manan Sagar	Rameshwar S. Bhagat	Rameshwar S. Bhagat	Kiran Gowda; Nitin Pathak
Composer(s)	Meet Bros; Amaal Mallik; Ankit Tiwari; Manj Musik; Pranaay Rijia	Mithoon; Arko; Sandeep Shirodkar; Gourov-Roshin; Pranaay Rijia	Vishal–Shekhar; Tanishk Bagchi; Sachet–Parampara; Rochak Kohli; Pranaay Rijia	Badshah; Agaaz; Tanishk Bagchi; Ganesh Waghela; Payal Dev; Aditya Dev; Siddhaant Miishhraa; Suyyash–Siddharth; Gourov Dasgupta
Background Score	Julius Packiam	Julius Packiam	Julius Packiam	Sanchit Balhara and Ankit Balhara
Production Companies	Nadiadwala Grandson Entertainment	Nadiadwala Grandson Entertainment	Fox Star Studios; Nadiadwala Grandson Entertainment	Nadiadwala Grandson Entertainment
Distributing Companies	UTV Motion Pictures	Fox Star Studios	Fox Star Studios	Pen Mardurdhar
Running Time	138 minutes	144 minutes	143 minutes	157 minutes

== Reception ==
Box office performance

Film	Release date	Budget	Worldwide Box Office
Baaghi	29 April 2016	₹35 crore (US$5.21 million)	₹129 crore (US$19.2 million)
Baaghi 2	30 March 2018	₹59 crore (US$8.63 million)	₹254.33 crore (US$37.19 million)
Baaghi 3	6 March 2020	₹80 crore (US$10.8 million)	₹137.07 crore (US$18.5 million)
Baaghi 4	5 September 2025	₹80 crore (equivalent to ₹83 crore or US$8.6 million in 2026)	₹66.39 crore (equivalent to ₹69 crore or US$7.1 million in 2026)
Total		₹254 crore (US$26 million)	₹586.79 crore (US$61 million)

Critical reception

Film	Rotten Tomatoes
Baaghi	14% (4.3/10 average rating) (7 reviews)
Baaghi 2	33% (4/10 average rating) (12 reviews)
Baaghi 3	0% (3.3/10 average rating) (12 reviews)
