= Disha Patani =

Indian actress (born 1992)

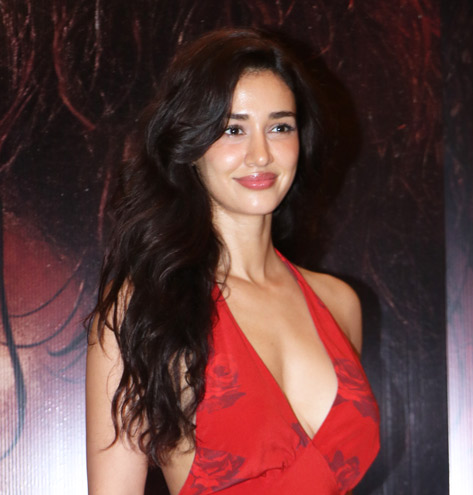
- Patani in 2026
- Born: 13 June 1992 (age 34); Bareilly, Uttar Pradesh, India
- Occupation: Actress
- Years active: 2015–present

Disha Patani (Note: Hindi pronunciation: [d̪ɪʃa paːʈəˈni]) (born 13 June 1992) is an Indian actress who works primarily in Hindi films. Known for her fitness and supporting roles, she has appeared in Forbes India's Celebrity 100 list of 2019.

Patani made her acting debut with the Telugu action drama Loafer (2015), and had her first Hindi film release with the biopic M.S. Dhoni: The Untold Story (2016). After appearing in the Chinese action comedy Kung Fu Yoga (2017), Patani featured in the action films Baaghi 2 (2018), Kalki 2898 AD (2024) and thrillers Malang (2020) and Awarapan 2 (2026) all of which were commercial success.

== Early life and education ==
Disha Patani was born on 13 June 1992 in Bareilly, Uttar Pradesh, in a Hindu Kumaoni Rajput family. Her father, Jagadish Singh Patani, is a former deputy superintendent of police and her mother, Padma Patani, is a health inspector. Her elder sister, Khushboo Patani served as a major in the Indian Army and is a fitness coach-cum-entrepreneur. She also has a younger brother, Suryansh Patani.

Patani completed her primary schooling at BBL Public School, Bareilly. Patani pursued a Bachelor of Technology in engineering at Amity University, Noida, (Note: Patani is reported as having gone to either Amity University, Noida or Amity University, Lucknow) and planned on joining the Indian Air Force and becoming a pilot. During her second year at Amity University in 2013, she participated in a modelling contest and ended up winning, and was brought to Mumbai as part of the contest's reward. There, she was spotted by a modelling agency, but Patani states that she turned down the agency's offer because she would not have been able to fulfill her college's minimum attendance requirements while modelling at the same time. Patani thusly participated in runway walks afterwards instead. She was the first runner up of Pond's Femina Miss India Indore 2013.

== Career ==
=== Early auditions (2013–2015) ===
Patani stated that she auditioned in 2013 for a film directed by Puri Jagannadh, but did not get the role. According to the Bangalore Mirror, in June 2014 Patani was shortlisted to play a role in Badtameez Dil, loosely based on the 1847-1848 novel Vanity Fair, but the producer for the film, Karan Johar, allegedly felt that Patani would instead be more apt for different production of his, that being Sonam Nair's No Sex Please, We're Indians. Badtameez Dil would later end up being indefinitely delayed, and afterwards No Sex Please, We're Indians would also be shelved after they failed to find a male lead.

In 2015, Patani auditioned for the role of Tiger Shroff's character's love interest in the film Baaghi (2016), and, according to Gaurav Dubey at Mid-Day, had begun prepping for the role when she was replaced in her role by Shraddha Kapoor. This was denied by Patani's manager, who told Mid-Day that she was "never in Baaghi", but that she was "doing a Nadiadwala film for sure".

=== Debut and early success (2015–2020) ===
Patani debuted with a Telugu film, Loafer alongside Varun Tej in 2015. She plays the role of Mouni, a girl who runs from home to escape a forced marriage. Directed by Puri Jagannadh and produced by C. Kalyan under C.K. Entertainment, the film was made on a budget of ₹200 million and performed poorly at the box office with a lifetime collection of ₹106 million. A review published in The Times of India praised Patani's acting, describing her as "an amazing find" and "a pleasure to watch in every frame despite being given limited scope to perform". In the following year, Disha appeared in a music video, Befikra along with Tiger Shroff which was produced by Bhushan Kumar and Krishan Kumar under T-Series and composed by Meet Bros. Written and directed by Meet Bros, the singer, Aditi Singh Sharma lent her voice.

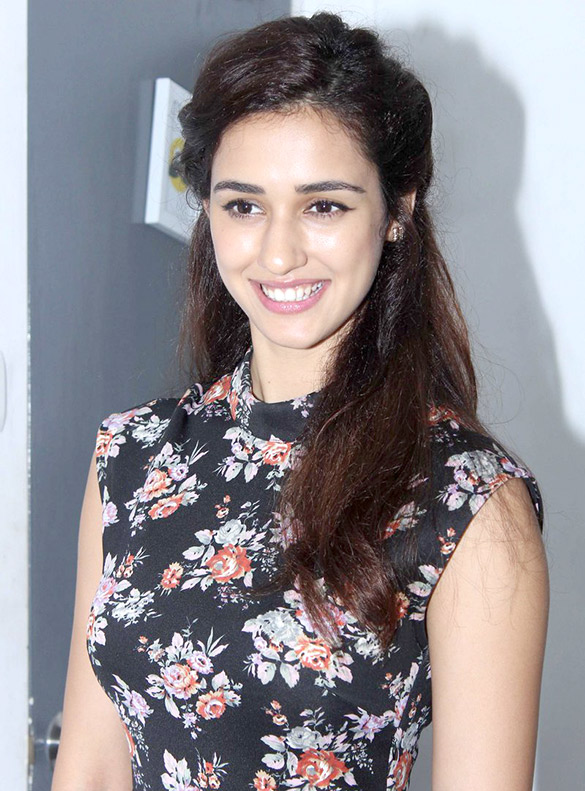
Patani during promotion of M.S. Dhoni: The Untold Story in 2017

Patani found her commercial break with Neeraj Pandey's M.S. Dhoni: The Untold Story, a biographical sports film based on the life story of MS Dhoni, the former captain of the Indian Cricket Team along with Sushant Singh Rajput and Kiara Advani. She plays the role of Priyanka Jha, the girlfriend of Rajput's character who dies in a car accident. Directed by Neeraj Pandey, the film emerged as a major commercial success, earning over ₹2.16 billion (US$23 million). Taran Adarsh from Bollywood Hungama and Shubhra Gupta from The Indian Express both commended Patani on a strong debut. At the IIFA Awards, she won the IIFA Award for Star Debut of the Year – Female). She also featured in Jackie Chan's Kung Fu Yoga, along with Sonu Sood, playing the role of an Indian professor tasked with finding India's lost treasure in Tibet. The film performed poorly among Indian moviegoers and critics, though Patani's performance was praised by HuffPost.

In 2018, Patani starred opposite Tiger Shroff in Baaghi 2, the second instalment of the Baaghi franchise. The film features Patani as Neha Rawat, the ex-girlfriend of Shroff's character. Saibal Chatterjee of NDTV wrote, "Patani is a pretty sight all right but is only required to sleepwalk through her role". Sukanya Verma of Rediff was more critical, describing her role in the film as "remarkably insipid". The romance subplot between Patani's and Shroff's characters, however, was described by Chatterjee as a "mere pretext for musical interludes". Patani's dancing in said musical interludes, namely in "Mundiyan", was praised by Firstpost, though The Quint described her as being "confined to the 'eye-candy' role in the song". Grossing over ₹258 crore (US$28 million) worldwide, the film ranks among the highest-grossing Hindi films of 2018. The film brought her recognition for her fitness-focused image and placed her into the action film space.

In 2019, Patani appeared in a brief role in the action drama film Bharat starring Salman Khan and Katrina Kaif. The film was a commercial success and one of the year's highest grosser. She began the new decade with Mohit Suri's action thriller film Malang co-starring Aditya Roy Kapur, Anil Kapoor and Kunal Khemu. Writing for Bollywood Hungama wrote that she, "gets the most screen time ever she looks gorgeous and delivers a heart-warming performance". It was a moderate commercial success. The following month, she appeared in the song "Do You Love Me" for the film Baaghi 3, the third instalment of the Baaghi franchise. The film received mixed reviews from critics, though Patani's performance in the song was praised by The Week, which stated that "It would take a lot of effort to look past the 'similarities' the song has to other people's work, but Disha moves like a dream". Patani, speaking in retrospect on her involvement in Baaghi 2 and Baaghi 3, stated the franchise with helped in "sharpening my dance skills".

=== Career downturn (2021–2024) ===
In 2021, Patani reunited with Salman Khan as the leading lady in Prabhu Deva's Radhe, which was delayed by a year due to the COVID-19 pandemic. The film was released coinciding with Eid al-Fitr, as premium video on demand on Zee Plex through ZEE5. Although the film had strong viewership on OTT, it was panned by critics. In 2022, Patani played a proxy killer in Mohit Suri's psychological thriller Ek Villain Returns opposite John Abraham. It underperformed commercially. Sukanya Vema of Rediff dismissed Patani's character as derivative.

In 2024, Patani played a terrorist disguised as an air hostess in the Sidharth Malhotra-starrer Yodha. Pratikshya Mishra of The Quint termed Patani a "potential action star", while praising her fight sequence, but added that her dialogues fail to make an impact. The film emerged as a box-office bomb. The same year she had a brief role of Roxie which critics describing it as an "unnecessary" and "out of place" 10-minute cameo of Bhairava's love interest (played by Prabhas) in the Telugu film Kalki 2898 AD. The film was a major success commercially earning over ₹12 billion (US$130 million), emerging as the year's highest-grossing Indian film and Patani's first success since Malang. Following this, she expanded to Tamil films with Kanguva, playing a bounty hunter opposite Suriya. The film opened to mixed reviews with criticism for her "insignificant part" from India Today's Janani K. It underperformed at the box office.

=== Commercial success (2025-present) ===
After no release in 2025, Patani had three film releases in 2026. She first briefly appeared in Vishal Bhardwaj ensemble romantic action O'Romeo starring Shahid Kapoor, where she played Julie, a dancer. The film failed commercially. She next starred in the ensemble comedy Welcome to the Jungle opposite Akshay Kumar. The film received mixed reviews, with critics stating, "Patani is largely cosmetic, serving as a high-glamour visual presence and feature for "musical sequences" rather than a heavy narrative driver." In her final release of the year, Patani played the female lead in Emraan Hashmi's romantic drama, Awarapan 2, a sequel to the 2007 film. Sreeju Sudhakaran of Rediff opined, "There is a noticeable improvement in Patani's performance, even when she is styled in "distractingly glamorous" outfits but dismissed the chemistry between her and Hashmi. Both Awarapan 2 and Welcome to the Jungle emerged as commercial success, and the eighth and ninth highest-grossing Hindi film of the year respectively.

== Other work and media image ==
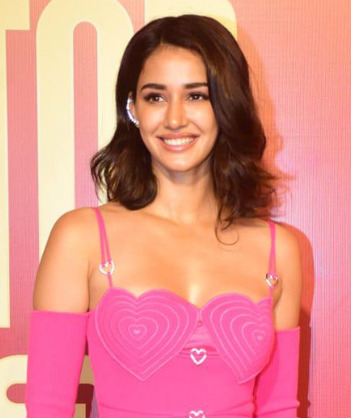
Patani in 2023

Critics have frequently noted that Patani's roles in many of her films are often "insignificant," characterised by limited screen time, a focus on her physical appearance, and little to no emotional depth. While she is recognised for her impressive fitness, dance skills, and screen presence, she has been described as a "starlet" or "eye candy" in several high-profile projects.

Patani was placed fifth in the list of most searched celebrities on Google of 2016. She is one of the most followed celebrities on social media with over 57.5 million Instagram followers. In 2019, Patani appeared in Forbes India's Celebrity 100 list, ranking 43rd with an estimated annual income of ₹58.0 million (US$620,000).

Patani has frequently featured in Times' 50 Most Desirable Woman list. She ranked 19th in 2017 and 9th in 2018. Patani was named the Times' Most Desirable Woman in 2019 and ranked 3rd in 2020. Patani is a prominent celebrity endorser for brands and products including Joy personal care, Bata footwears and Fossil watches. Patani has performed at the opening ceremony of the 2017 Indian Premier League, in Indore. In March 2023, Patani performed in various cities in the United States for "The Entertainers" tour, alongside Akshay Kumar, Mouni Roy, Nora Fatehi, Sonam Bajwa, Aparshakti Khurana, Stebin Ben, and Zahrah S Khan. she also performed at the opening ceremony of the 2025 Indian Premier League. In 2024, she was placed 21st on IMDb's List of 100 Most Viewed Indian Stars.

Patani has featured in several magazine editorials as part of her fashion and travel activities internationally. She appeared on the cover of Grazia India in a 2017 editorial photographed in Kuala Lumpur, was featured on the cover of Travel + Leisure India's Middle East special in a 2018 editorial photographed in Israel, and appeared in ELLE India's digital cover story in 2024, photographed in Thailand.

== Filmography ==
Key
†	Denotes films that have not yet been released

=== Films ===
- All films are in Hindi unless otherwise noted.

Year	Title	Role(s)	Notes	Ref.
2015	Loafer	Mouni / Parijatam	Telugu film	
2016	M.S. Dhoni: The Untold Story	Priyanka Jha		
2017	Kung Fu Yoga	Ashmita	Chinese film	
2018	Welcome to New York	Herself	Cameo appearance	
2018	Baaghi 2	Neha Rawat		
2019	Bharat	Radha Mathur		
2020	Malang	Sara Nambiar		
2020	Baaghi 3	Dancer	Special appearance in the song "Do You Love Me"	
2021	Radhe	Diya Abhyankar		
2022	Ek Villain Returns	Rasika Mapuskar		
2024	Yodha	Laila Khalid		
2024	Kalki 2898 AD	Roxie	Telugu film	
2024	Kanguva	Angelina	Tamil film	
2026	O'Romeo	Julie	Cameo appearance	
2026	Holiguards Saga — The Portal of Force	Jessica	English film	
2026	Welcome to the Jungle	Nadia Daruwala		
2026	Awarapan 2	Zara Singh		
2027	Sajid Khan’s untitled comedy †	TBA	Filming	

=== Television ===
Year	Title	Role(s)	Notes	Ref(s)
2025	The B***ds of Bollywood	Herself	Cameo appearance	

== Awards and nominations ==
Year	Award	Category	Work	Result	Ref.
2017	BIG Star Entertainment Awards	Most Entertaining Actor in a Drama Film – Female	M.S. Dhoni: The Untold Story	Nominated	
2017	BIG Star Entertainment Awards	Most Entertaining Actor Debut – Female	M.S. Dhoni: The Untold Story	Won	
2017	Stardust Awards	Superstar of Tomorrow – Female	M.S. Dhoni: The Untold Story	Won	
2017	Stardust Awards	Best Debut (Female)	M.S. Dhoni: The Untold Story	Won	
2017	International Indian Film Academy Awards	Star Debut of the Year – Female	M.S. Dhoni: The Untold Story	Won	
2017	International Indian Film Academy Awards	Best Supporting Actress	M.S. Dhoni: The Untold Story	Nominated	
2017	Screen Awards	Best Female Debut	M.S. Dhoni: The Untold Story	Won	
2023	Bollywood Hungama Style Icons	Stylish Mould Breaking Star Female	—N/a	Nominated	
2023	Bollywood Hungama Style Icons	Most Stylish Trendsetter	—N/a	Nominated	
2023	Bollywood Hungama Style Icons	Stylish Glam Star	—N/a	Nominated	
2023	Pinkvilla Style Icons Awards	Glamorous Trendsetter of the Year	—N/a	Won	
2024	Pinkvilla Screen and Style Icons Awards	Most Stylish Game Changer	—N/a	Won	
2025	Pinkvilla Screen and Style Icons Awards	Most Stylish Glam Star	—N/a	Won	
