= Ankita Lokhande =

Indian actress (born 1984)

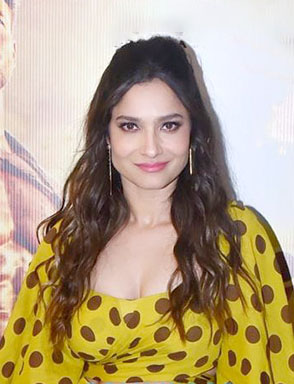
- Lokhande in 2021 at Baaghi 3 Promotions
- Born: Tanuja Lokhande; 19 December 1984 (age 41); Indore, Madhya Pradesh, India
- Other name: Ankita Lokhande Jain
- Occupation: Actress
- Years active: 2007–present
- Notable work: Pavitra Rishta; Manikarnika: The Queen of Jhansi; Bigg Boss 17
- Spouse: Vicky Jain (m. 2021)

Ankita Lokhande Jain (pronounced [əŋˈkɪt̪a ˈloːkʰəɳɖeː]; born Tanuja Lokhande; 19 December 1984) is an Indian actress known for her work in Hindi films and television. She made her acting debut with the role of Archana Manav Deshmukh in Pavitra Rishta and is the recipient of 3 Gold Awards, 1 ITA Award, and 2 Indian Telly Award. She also appeared in the films Manikarnika: The Queen of Jhansi, Baaghi 3 and Swatantrya Veer Savarkar. In 2023, she participated in Bigg Boss 17.

== Early life ==
Lokhande was born as Tanuja Lokhande, on 19 December 1984 in Indore She was born in a Marathi family, to Shashikant Lokhande and Vandana Phadnis Lokhande, a teacher. She also has two brothers Sooraj and Arpan, and a sister Jyoti. After graduating she moved to Mumbai in 2005 to pursue a career in acting. She has been a badminton champion, during her early days.

== Career ==
=== Debut and establishment (2009–2018) ===
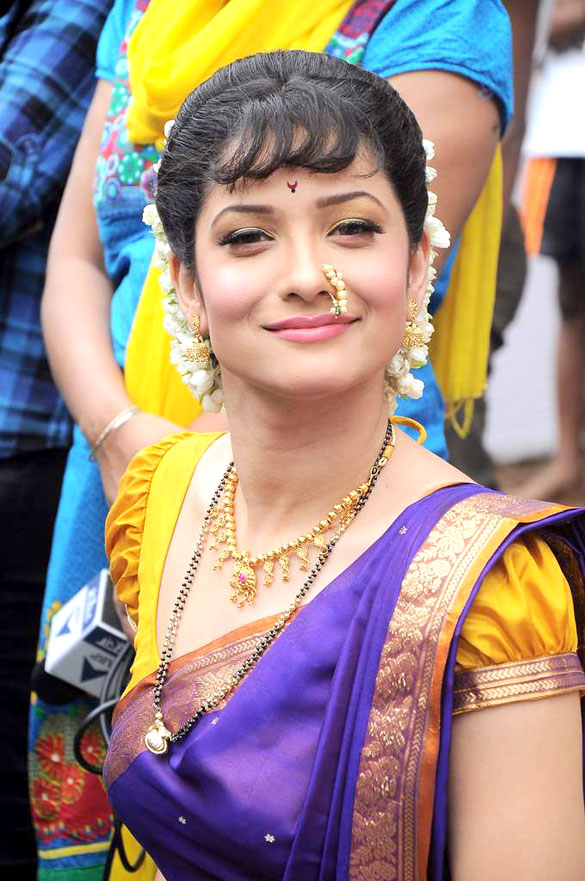
Lokhande on the sets of Pavitra Rishta in 2013

After participating in India's Best Cinestars Ki Khoj (2007–09), Lokhande bagged the lead role of Archana Deshmukh in Ekta Kapoor's daily soap Pavitra Rishta. She portrayed Archana opposite Sushant Singh Rajput and Hiten Tejwani from 2009 to 2014. Pavitra Rishta took a generation leap in 2013 and Lokhande also began playing Archana's granddaughter Ankita Karmarkar, opposite Karan Veer Mehra, until the series ended in 2014.

Lokhande participated in Jhalak Dikhhla Jaa 4, where she was ranked 5th and Comedy Circus ka Naya Daur. She did two episodes for Ek Thhi Naayka, opposite Sachin Shroff.

After a two-year hiatus from acting and her separation from Rajput, there were reports that Lokhande was set to make her film debut in Sanjay Leela Bhansali's period drama Padmaavat (2018). However, she left the film, stating that she was not ready for films at that time. The following year, speculation spread that she had been signed for Girish Malik's film Torbaaz along with Sanjay Dutt. However, rumours proved to be untrue after Malik stated that Lokhande was not going to be involved with the film.

=== Expansion to films (2019–2022) ===
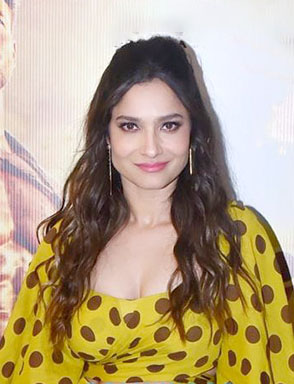
Lokhande snapped at Baaghi 3 promotions

In 2018, Lokhande announced that she would make her film debut in the role of Jhalkaribai, a warrior in Krish and Kangana Ranaut's joint directorial venture Manikarnika: The Queen of Jhansi, an epic drama based on the life of Rani Lakshmi Bai. The film was released on the eve of Republic Day 2019 and emerged as a hit at the box office. Bollywood Hungama noted, "Lokhande as Jhalkari Bai is excellent and leaves a tremendous mark in her limited screen time."

Lokhande next starred in Sajid Nadiadwala's action thriller film Baaghi 3 in 2020, the third part of the Baaghi trilogy, alongside Tiger Shroff, Shraddha Kapoor and Riteish Deshmukh. She played the role of Kapoor's elder sister married to Deshmukh's character. The film was released prior to the shutdown of theatres owing to the COVID-19 pandemic in India, which affected the box office performance. Filmfare stated, "The two girls Shraddha and Ankita, despite the build-up about them both being fiery characters, have nothing to do really in the film."

Lokhande reprised her role as Archana Deshmukh in the web series Pavitra Rishta: It's Never Too Late along with Shaheer Sheikh from 2021 to 2022. In her review, Archika Khurana said, "As Archana, Ankita gives a well-balanced and likeable performance. She makes us believe that this role was custom-made for her." In February 2022, Lokhande participated in StarPlus' Smart Jodi with her husband, Vicky Jain, subsequently becoming the winner of the season.

=== Further career and recent work (2023-present) ===
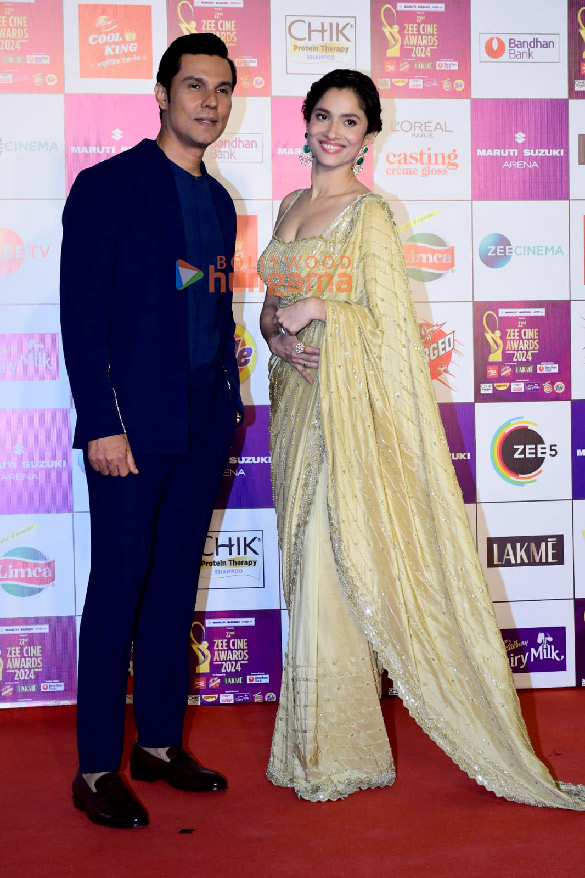
Lokhande and Randeep Hooda snapped at Zee Cine Awards 2024

In 2023, she played a woman going through a divorce in the film The Last Coffee. Times of India wrote, "Lokhande looks stunning and shines brightly in emotional scenes." From 2023 to 2024, Lokhande appeared as a contestant on the reality TV show Bigg Boss 17. She joined the show alongside her husband, Vicky Jain. Lokhande was placed as the 3rd runner-up of the show.

In 2024, Lokhande appeared in Swatantrya Veer Savarkar , playing Yamunabai Savarkar opposite Randeep Hooda. Sana Farzeen of India Today stated, "Ankita Lokhande gives an honest performance even though she doesn't have much to do."

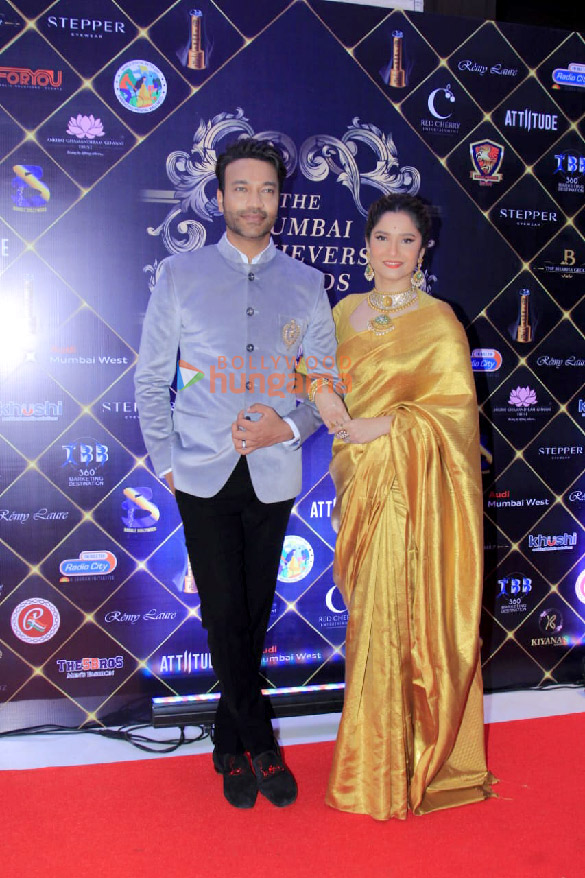
Lokhande with husband Vicky Jain at The Mumbai Achievers Awards 2023

== Personal life ==
Lokhande co-starred with Sushant Singh Rajput in Pavitra Rishta, and they began dating in 2010. Rajput proposed to her on the dance reality show Jhalak Dikhhla Jaa 4. In a 2016 interview, the couple spoke of marrying each other. But the same year, the couple parted their ways. She later said in an interview that Rajput wanted to focus on his career and hence they parted ways.

In 2019, Lokhande revealed her relationship with Vicky Jain, a businessman from Bilaspur. Lokhande married Jain on 14 December 2021 in a traditional ceremony in Mumbai.

== Media image ==
Lokhande has established herself as one of the most popular and highest-paid television actresses in India. She was placed 7th in Rediff.com's "Top 10 Television Actresses" list of 2014. In UK-based newspaper Eastern Eye's "50 Sexiest Asian Women" list, Lokhande was placed 29th in 2013. In 2024, she was featured on the Times Square's billboard.

== Filmography ==
=== Films ===
Year	Title	Role	Ref.
2019	Manikarnika: The Queen of Jhansi	Jhalkaribai	
2020	Baaghi 3	Ruchi Chaturvedi	
2023	The Last Coffee	Iram Qureshi	
2024	Swatantrya Veer Savarkar	Yamunabai Savarkar	

=== Television ===
Year	Title	Role	Notes	Ref.
2007	India's Best Cinestars Ki Khoj	Contestant		
2009–2014	Pavitra Rishta	Archana Karanjkar Deshmukh / Ankita Deshmukh Karmarkar		
2011	Jhalak Dikhhla Jaa 4	Contestant	5th place	
2011	Comedy Circus Ka Naya Daur	Contestant		
2013	Ek Thhi Naayka	Pragya		
2022	Smart Jodi	Contestant	Winner	
2023–2024	Bigg Boss 17	Contestant	4th place	
2024–2026	Laughter Chefs – Unlimited Entertainment	Contestant	Season 1–3	

==== Special appearances ====
Year	Title	Role	Ref.
2009	Saat Phere – Saloni Ka Safar	Archana	
2009	Chotti Bahu	Archana	
2020	The Kapil Sharma Show	Herself	
2023	The Kapil Sharma Show	Herself	
2022	Lock Upp	Herself	
2024	Dance Deewane 4	Herself	
2024	Bigg Boss 18	Herself	

=== Web series ===
Year	Title	Role	Notes	Ref.
2021–2022	Pavitra Rishta: It's Never Too Late	Archana Deshmukh		
2024	Amrapali	Amrapali	Filming	

=== Music videos ===
Year	Title	Singer	Ref.
2024	Laa Pila De Sharaab	Vishal Mishra	

== Awards and nominations ==
Year	Award	Category	Work	Result	Ref.
2009	Indian Television Academy Awards	Best Actress (Popular)	Pavitra Rishta	Nominated	
2009	Indian Telly Awards	Fresh New Face - Female	Pavitra Rishta	Nominated	
2010	Indian Telly Awards	Best Actress in a Lead Role	Pavitra Rishta	Nominated	
2010	Gold Awards	Debut in a Lead Role - Female	Pavitra Rishta	Won	
2010	Gold Awards	Best Actress in a Lead Role	Pavitra Rishta	Nominated	
2010	Indian Television Academy Awards	GR8! Face of The Year	Pavitra Rishta	Won	
2010	Indian Television Academy Awards	Best Actress (Popular)	Pavitra Rishta	Nominated	
2011	Indian Television Academy Awards	Best Actress (Popular)	Pavitra Rishta	Nominated	
2011	Gold Awards	Best Actress in a Lead Role	Pavitra Rishta	Won	
2011	Producers Guild Film Awards	Best Actress in Drama Series	Pavitra Rishta	Won	
2012	Indian Telly Awards	Best Actress in a Lead Role	Pavitra Rishta	Nominated	
2012	Indian Telly Awards	Best Onscreen Couple (with Sushant Singh Rajput)	Pavitra Rishta	Nominated	
2012	Indian Telly Awards	Best Television Personality of the Year	Pavitra Rishta	Won	
2012	Gold Awards	Best Actress in a Lead Role	Pavitra Rishta	Won	
2013	Producers Guild Film Awards	Best Actress in Drama Series	Pavitra Rishta	Nominated	
2014	Producers Guild Film Awards	Best Actress in Drama Series	Pavitra Rishta	Won	
2020	Zee Cine Awards	Best Female Debut	Manikarnika: The Queen of Jhansi	Nominated	
2023	Iconic Gold Awards	Power TV Couple (with Vikas Jain)	—N/a	Won	
2024	Pinkvilla Screen and Style Icons Awards	Most Stylish TV Actress	—N/a	Won	
