= Kick (disambiguation) =

A kick is an attack using a foot, knee or leg.

Kick, Kicking, Kicks, or The Kick may also refer to:

== Places ==
- Kicking, Austria (disambiguation)

== People ==
- Kick (comedian) (born 1979), Japanese comedian and writer
- Kick Gurry (born 1978), Australian actor
- Cornelis Kick (1634–1681), Dutch painter
- Russ Kick (born 1969), American writer, editor, and publisher
- Simon Kick (1603–1652), Dutch painter

== Art, entertainment, and media ==
=== Dancing ===
- Kick (b-boy move), a move akin to a hand stand
- Kick (dance move), a dance move

=== Films ===
- Kick (1999 film), an Australian film directed by Lynda Heys
- Kick (2009 film), a Tollywood film starring Ravi Teja
  - Kick 2, its 2015 sequel
- Kick (2014 film), a Bollywood remake of the Telugu film, starring Salman Khan
  - Kick 2 (2024 film), a sequel to the above, remake of the 2015 film
- Kicks (film), a 2016 American adventure film
- The Kick (film), a 2011 Thai-Korean martial arts film

=== Games ===
- Kick (video game), a 1981 arcade game

=== Music ===
- Kick drum, a bass drum played with a foot pedal

==== Albums ====
- Kick (White Rose Movement album), 2006
- Kick (INXS album), 1987, or the title song
- Kick, a 2019 album by Dave Hause
- Kick, a 2022 compilation by Arca
  - Kick I, a 2020 album by Arca
  - Kick II, a 2021 album by Arca
  - Kick III, a 2021 album by Arca
  - Kick IIII, a 2021 album by Arca
  - Kick IIIII, a 2021 album by Arca
- Kicks (1990s album), a 2009 album by 1990s
- Kicks (Rickie Lee Jones album), a 2019 album by Rickie Lee Jones
- Kickin', a 1989 album by Rick James
- Kickin', a 1988 album by The Brothers Johnson
- Kickin, a 1975 album by Mighty Clouds of Joy
- The Kick (album), a 2022 album by Foxes, or the title song

=== Songs ===
- "Kicks" (song), a 1966 song by Paul Revere & the Raiders
- "Kick", a song by f(x) from their 2013 album Pink Tape
- "Kick", a song by White Zombie from their 1987 EP Psycho-Head Blowout
- "Kicks", a song by Lights on her 2017 album Skin&Earth
- "Kicks", a song by Lou Reed on his 1976 album Coney Island Baby
- "The Kick", a 1963 song by The Capitols

=== Television ===
- Kick (TV series), an Australian television series
- Kicks, a TV movie starring Shelley Hack and Anthony Geary
- Kicks (Brooklyn Nine-Nine), an episode of Brooklyn Nine-Nine

== Brands ==
- Kick (soft drink), a citrus soft drink in North America
- Kicks, a Beanie Baby bear produced in 1999
- Kicks, or sneakers
- Nissan Kicks, a sport utility vehicle model

== Computing ==
- Kick (service), a live streaming service
- KICK, a common Internet Relay Chat command to remove a person from a channel
- CICS, pronounced "Kicks", a transaction server that runs primarily on IBM mainframe

== Recoil ==
- Kick, an attempt by an oil well being drilled to blowout
- Kick, the recoil of a firearm

== Sports ==
- Kick (football), an action used in various forms of football
  - Kick (association football), kicking in the association (soccer) code of football
- Kick (snooker), or kick shot, a type of shot in the game snooker
- Kick, an attack in professional wrestling
- Kick (running), a strong sprint at the finish of a race
- Kick, a colloquial term in chess used to describe when a pawn attacks a piece, forcing it to move or be captured

== See also ==
- KICK (disambiguation)
- Kiick, surname
- Kik (disambiguation)
