= Kix =

Kix or KIX may refer to:

== Music ==
- Kix Brooks (born 1955), member of the country music duo Brooks & Dunn
- Kix (band), American band who achieved popularity in the 1980s
  - Kix (album), 1981 debut album by Kix
- "Kix" (song), a 1997 song released by Per Gessle (from Roxette)
- Lee Thompson (saxophonist) (born 1957), nicknamed Kix, member of the band Madness

== Broadcasting ==
- Kix 87.6 FM, Wellington, New Zealand, radio station
- Kix 96.2 FM, British radio station
- Kix 106, former name of radio station Mix 106.3
- KIX Country, a narrowcast country music radio station in Australia
- Kix FM, a community radio station in Kangaroo Island, Australia
- Kix (UK and Ireland TV channel), a UK children's and teen's television channel (now Pop Max)
- Kix (Asian TV channel), a television channel owned by a Hong Kong–based company

== Transportation ==
- Kansai International Airport, IATA code KIX, serving the Osaka, Kyōto, Kōbe regions in Japan

== Computing and science ==
- KiXtart, a Windows scripting language
- KIX domain, protein interaction domain in the P300-CBP coactivator family
- Kix, the codename for the Google Docs edit surface and rendering engine

== Other ==
- Kix (cereal), a breakfast cereal
- KIX barcode (Klant index), a barcode type; see RM4SCC

== See also ==
- Kixx (disambiguation)
- Kick (disambiguation), includes uses of the plural, "kicks"
