= Kixx =

Kixx may refer to:

- Kixx (U.S. Gold), a defunct budget video game label associated with former publisher U.S. Gold
- KIXX, a radio station broadcasting a Hot AC format serving the Watertown, South Dakota, USA area
- Philadelphia KiXX, an American indoor soccer team
- Kixx, a South Korean motor oil brand manufactured by GS Group
- Kixx, also known as Experiment 601, a fictional alien character in Disney's Lilo & Stitch franchise
- "Kixx", an episode of Lilo & Stitch: The Series that features the alien

== See also ==
- Kix (disambiguation)
- Kick (disambiguation), includes uses of the plural, "kicks"
