= Baaghi (2016 film) =

2016 Indian film by Sabbir Khan

- Theatrical release poster
- Directed by: Sabbir Khan
- Written by: Sanjeev Datta
- Based on: Varsham by Veeru Potla
- Produced by: Sajid Nadiadwala
- Starring: Tiger Shroff; Shraddha Kapoor; Sudheer Babu
- Cinematography: Binod Pradhan
- Edited by: Manan Ajay Sagar
- Music by: Score: Julius Packiam; Songs: Meet Bros; Amaal Mallik; Ankit Tiwari; Manj Musik; Pranaay Rijia
- Production company: Nadiadwala Grandson Entertainment
- Distributed by: UTV Motion Pictures
- Release date: 29 April 2016
- Running time: 133 minutes
- Country: India
- Language: Hindi
- Budget: ₹35 crore
- Box office: est. ₹129 crore

Baaghi is a 2016 Indian Hindi-language action thriller film directed by Sabbir Khan and produced by Sajid Nadiadwala under his banner Nadiadwala Grandson Entertainment. A remake of the 2004 Telugu film Varsham, while also sharing some similarities with the 2011 Indonesian film The Raid, the film stars Tiger Shroff and Shraddha Kapoor and Sudheer Babu in his Hindi debut, with Sunil Grover in a supporting role.

Baaghi was released worldwide on 29 April 2016 and received mixed reviews from critics. Made on a budget of ₹35 crore (US$3.6 million), the film earned over ₹129 crore (US$13 million) worldwide. Later, it spawned three spiritual sequels titled Baaghi 2 (2018), Baaghi 3 (2020) and Baaghi 4 (2025), thus becoming the first installment in the Baaghi film series.

== Plot ==
Raghav Shetty, a powerful don and a martial arts world champion, abducts Siya Khurana from her film set in Hyderabad and takes her to Bangkok. Siya's father, P.P. Khurana, along with Dasanna, a film producer, seeks the government officers and cops for help, but no one is ready to assist them as Raghav is an influential person and there is no extradition treaty between India and Thailand. Khurana then suggests to Dasanna that Ranveer "Ronny" Pratap Singh, Siya's ex-boyfriend and a rebellious martial artist, can destroy Raghav and rescue Siya. Initially hesitant, Ronny agrees as he needs money to treat Subbu, a mute young boy who is being treated for his vocal cords.

Past: Ronny meets Siya on a train and falls in love with Siya at first sight. He also sees that Siya also carries a rebellious personality. Raghav also sees Siya and lusts for her. At the behest of his late father, Colonel Samarjit Singh, Ronny unwillingly becomes a student in the Kalaripayattu Royal Academy of Martial Arts in Kerala, headed by Kailash Shetty a.k.a. Guruswamy, Samarjit's former army colleague and Raghav's father. In due course of time, Guruswamy disciplines Ronny into a rebel with a cause, thus making Ronny a rebellious martial artist and the master of the art of Kalaripayattu. As time goes on, Ronny and Siya fall in love with each other.

A money-minded Khurana agrees to marry Siya off to Raghav, who lures him with bundles of money. On learning that Siya is in love with Ronny, Khurana rats Ronny out to Raghav, who swears to kill him. Guruswamy overhears the plan and objects to it strongly. Feeling humiliated and enraged, Raghav kills Guruswamy by poisoning him to death. Later, Raghav tells his henchmen to get Ronny in front of him. The henchmen tries to harm Ronnie and Subbu, but Ronny beats up Raghav's henchmen brutally. Following a confrontation with Raghav and later at Guruswamy's funeral, Khurana creates an atmosphere of misunderstanding in league with Raghav, causing Ronny and Siya to break up and part ways.

Present: Ronny reaches Bangkok and visits Raghav's fight club, beating the most potent fighter to attract Raghav's attention. Raghav sends his henchmen to kill Ronnie, but Ronnie beats them up brutally. The next day, Ronny breaks into the house of Biju, Raghav's right-hand man, and holds Biju's wife at gunpoint, forcing him to reveal Siya's location. Learning that she is at the local hospital, Ronny saves Siya and escapes with her under both of them being disguised. Raghav manages to spot them, but couldn't do anything. The two stop at an island on their way back to India, where Siya discovers her father's deceit and the couple reunite. Raghav and his men suddenly attack the couple off-guard, where Biju shoots Ronny, who falls off a cliff.

Raghav takes Siya back to his place, but Siya realises that Ronny is alive, with Raghav being alerted to his invasive underbelly moments later. Realising Biju's treachery, Raghav questions him and Biju affirms that he spared Ronny as he had spared his wife earlier. Raghav is unconvinced and kills Biju. Ronny storms Raghav's building and single-handedly fights all the killers and swordsmen in Raghav's employ. Ronny reaches Raghav, who initially overpowers him. Raghav also reveals himself as the mastermind behind Guruswamy's death. Enraged, Raghav and Ronny uses Guruswamy's signature moves and kills Raghav, thus avenging Guruswamy's death. Now happily together with Siya, Ronny becomes the new teacher in Guruswamy's school.

== Cast ==
- Tiger Shroff as Ranveer "Ronny" Pratap Singh
- Shraddha Kapoor as Siya Khurana
- Sudheer Babu as Raghav Shetty (voiceover by Viraj Adhav)
- Sourav Chakraborty as Biju
- Shifuji Shaurya Bhardwaj as Kailash Shetty alias Guruswamy, Raghav's father
- Sunil Grover as Paresh Prakash Khurana "P. P.", Sia's father
- Kota Srinivasa Rao as Dasanna, a film producer
- Buddya Sunari Magar as Referee
- Sanjay Mishra as Harry
- Sumit Gulati as Sukhi
- Biswapati Sarkar as Hari, Ronny's friend
- Prashant Singh as Gopi
- Aryan Prajapati as Subbu
- Arun Bali in a voiceover as Col. Samarjit Singh, Ronny's father

== Production ==
Shroff trained and took up stunt classes for the film. Sajid Nadiadwala hired a special team of 50 people to keep Shroff's look under wraps. The makers did not want his look to be revealed because of his role in the film being distinct from his role in Heropanti. Telugu actor Sudheer Babu was signed to play a negative role, making his Bollywood debut. Shooting for Baaghi started on 27 May 2015. The shooting of the film completed on 21 February 2016. The film was extensively shot in India and Thailand. Soma Kerala Palace, Kochi was shown in the movie as the KARMA Institute (school of Guruswamy). Song "Sab Tera" was shot in the Poda Island.

== Soundtrack ==
Baaghi

Soundtrack album by Meet Bros, Amaal Mallik, Ankit Tiwari, Manj Musik and Pranaay Rijia
- Released: 14 March 2016
- Genre: Feature film soundtrack
- Length: 25:42
- Language: Hindi
- Label: T-Series
- Producer: Sajid Nadiadwala

Singles from Baaghi
- 1. "Sab Tera" Released: 18 March 2016; 2. "Let's Talk About Love" Released: 25 March 2016

The music of the film was composed by Meet Bros, Amaal Mallik, Ankit Tiwari, Manj Musik and Pranaay Rijia, while the score was composed by Julius Packiam. The song lyrics were written by Kumaar, Abhendra Kumar Upadhyay, Sanjeev Chaturvedi, Raftaar, Sabbir Khan and Rahul B. Seth. The first song of the film, "Sab Tera" was released on 18 March 2016, which was sung by Shraddha Kapoor and Armaan Malik. The second song of the film titled as "Let's Talk About Love", which was sung by Raftaar and Neha Kakkar was released on 25 March 2016. The album was released on 29 March 2016, which includes 6 songs.

Track listing
No.	Title	Lyrics	Music	Singer(s)	Length
1.	"Agar Tu Hota"	Abhendra Kumar Upadhyay	Ankit Tiwari	Ankit Tiwari	5:28
2.	"Cham Cham"	Kumaar	Meet Bros	Meet Bros, Monali Thakur	4:44
3.	"Girl I Need You"	Kumaar	Meet Bros	Meet Bros, Arijit Singh, Roach Killa, Khushboo Grewal	4:57
4.	"Let's Talk About Love"	Raftaar, Sabbir Khan	Manj Musik	Raftaar, Neha Kakkar	3:21
5.	"Sab Tera"	Sanjeev Chaturvedi	Amaal Mallik	Armaan Malik, Shraddha Kapoor	3:48
6.	"Get Ready To Fight"	Rahul B. Seth, Sabbir Khan	Pranaay Rijia	Benny Dayal, Siddharth Basrur	3:24
Total length:					25:42

== Reception ==
Baaghi received mixed reviews from critics with praise for its action choreography.

=== Critical response ===
On the review aggregator website Rotten Tomatoes, 14% of 7 critics' reviews are positive, with an average rating of 4.3/10.

Bollywood Hungama gave 3.5/5 stars and wrote, "Baaghi is a typical masala entertainer which scores high on action and performances from the lead cast." Mohar Basu of The Times of India gave 2.5/5 stars and wrote, "You could try finding thrill in Tiger's kicks but the film has nothing more to offer."

Ananya Bhattacharya of India Today gave 2/5 stars and wrote, "Watch Baaghi this week if you want to whistle along to Tiger and Shraddha's bone-breaking punches." Rohit Vats of Hindustan Times gave 2/5 stars and wrote "In short, The Karate Kid enters Bloodsport and appears in a hurry to become Ong Bak without losing the essential Bollywood qualities."

Anupama Chopra of Film Companion gave 2/5 stars and wrote, "Baaghi will best serve people who are interested in moves rather than movies."

=== Box office ===
Released on Friday, Baaghi netted ₹119.4 million and ₹155.1 million respectively on its first three days, bringing in a total of ₹38.58 crore net on its opening weekend and meeting its ₹37 crore production cost. By its seventh day, the film had netted ₹59.72 crore. Baaghi's daily collection peaked at ₹15.51 crore net on day three and began to decline thereafter, losing 79% of business by the end of the second week. The movie ultimately grossed ₹106.03 crore from India and ₹21.02 crore overseas. The total worldwide gross estimates ₹127.05 crores, thus becoming one of the highest-grossing films of Shroff's career.

== Sequel ==
On 1 May 2017, Shroff posted the first look poster of the sequel and the second installment of the Baaghi series Baaghi 2 on his Twitter account. Nadiadwala collaborated with Fox Star Studios following the dissolution of UTV Motion Pictures and the film was released under Fox Star Studios and Nadiadwala Grandson Entertainment. Directed by Ahmed Khan, the film was released worldwide on 30 March 2018. A third installment was also announced under the title of Baaghi 3, with Nadiadwala the producer, Khan the director, and Shroff in the lead role.
