= Nadiadwala Grandson Entertainment =

Indian film studio

Nadiadwala Grandson Entertainment Pvt. Ltd
- Formerly: Nadiadwala Theatre Productions
- Type: Private
- Industry: Entertainment
- Founded: 1992; 34 years ago, Mumbai, Maharashtra
- Founder: Sajid Nadiadwala
- Headquarters: Mumbai, Maharashtra, India
- Key people: Dipti Jindal (CEO)
- Products: Films, Music
- Owner: Sajid Nadiadwala
- Website: www.nadiadwalagrandson.com

Nadiadwala Grandson Entertainment Pvt Ltd (NGE) is an Indian film production company based in Mumbai. It was established by Sajid Nadiadwala in 1992. The company is a part of the Hindi film industry that is involved in Motion picture, radio, television and other entertainment activities. Rakesh Madhotra is the current CEO of the company.

== Background ==
The Nadiadwala family, who migrated to Mumbai from Nadiad, Kheda district (Gujarat), have been in the film industry for three generations, starting with A. K. Nadiadwala followed by his son Sulieman Nadiadwala and now grandson Sajid Nadiadwala. As of June 2025, they are celebrating 75 years of their existence in the film industry. The first film to be produced under their legacy was Inspector (1956) by Abdul Karim Nadiadwala. He further went on to produce movies like Taj Mahal (1963) and Chitralekha (1964). Continuing this legacy, Sajid Nadiadwala founded this company in 1992.

== Filmography ==
Key
†	Denotes films that have not yet been released

Year	Film	Director	Notes
1992	Zulm Ki Hukumat	Bharat Rangachary	
1993	Waqt Hamara Hai	Bharat Rangachary	
1995	Andolan	Aziz Sejawal	
1996	Jeet	Raj Kanwar	
1997	Judwaa	David Dhawan	
2000	Har Dil Jo Pyar Karega	Raj Kanwar	
2004	Mujhse Shaadi Karogi	David Dhawan	
2006	Jaan-E-Mann	Shirish Kunder	
2007	Heyy Babyy	Sajid Khan	
2009	Kambakkht Ishq	Sabbir Khan	
2010	Housefull	Sajid Khan	
2010	Anjaana Anjaani	Siddharth Anand	
2012	Housefull 2	Sajid Khan	
2014	Highway	Imtiaz Ali	
2014	2 States	Abhishek Varman	
2014	Heropanti	Sabbir Khan	
2014	Kick	Sajid Nadiadwala	
2015	Phantom	Kabir Khan	
2015	Tamasha	Imtiaz Ali	
2016	Baaghi	Sabbir Khan	
2016	Housefull 3	Farhad Samji and Sajid Samji	
2016	Dishoom	Rohit Dhawan	
2017	Rangoon	Vishal Bhardwaj	
2017	Judwaa 2	David Dhawan	
2018	Baaghi 2	Ahmed Khan	
2019	Kalank	Abhishek Varman	
2019	Super 30	Vikas Bahl	
2019	Chhichhore	Nitesh Tiwari	
2019	Housefull 4	Farhad Samji	
2020	Baaghi 3	Ahmed Khan	
2021	Tadap	Milan Luthria	
2021	83	Kabir Khan	
2022	Bachchhan Paandey	Farhad Samji	
2022	Heropanti 2	Ahmed Khan	
2023	Satyaprem Ki Katha	Sameer Vidwans	
2023	Bawaal	Nitesh Tiwari	Released on Amazon Prime Video
2024	Chandu Champion	Kabir Khan	
2024	Yek Number	Rajesh Mapuskar	Marathi language film
2025	Sikandar	A. R. Murugadoss	
2025	Housefull 5	Tarun Mansukhani	
2025	Baaghi 4	A. Harsha	
2026	O'Romeo	Vishal Bhardwaj	
2026	Dhabkaaro	Abhishek Shah	Gujarati language film
2027	Aisi Deewangi Dekhi Nahi Kahin †	Shashank Khaitan	
