= KICK =

KICK may refer to:

- KICK (AM), a radio station (1340 AM) licensed to serve Springfield, Missouri, United States
- KICK-FM, a radio station (97.9 FM) licensed to Palmyra, Missouri
- CKIC-FM, a radio station (92.9 FM) licensed to Winnipeg, Manitoba, Canada, branded as KICK-FM
- Karate International Council of Kickboxing
- KICK (Detroit), a Michigan non-profit business
- Kick, Swedish pop music duo

== See also ==
- Kick (disambiguation)
