= Sabbir Khan =

Indian filmmaker

Sabbir Khan is an Indian film director and screenwriter.

== Life and career ==
His father Noor Dewasi was a lyricist in the late 1960s and early 1970s.

He made his directorial debut with Kambakkht Ishq, a 2009 Indian Hindi-language romantic comedy film produced by Sajid Nadiadwala. The film was based on the 2002 Tamil film, Pammal K. Sambandam. It featured Akshay Kumar and Kareena Kapoor in the lead roles, along with Aftab Shivdasani and Amrita Arora in supporting roles. Hollywood actors Sylvester Stallone, Denise Richards, Brandon Routh, and Holly Valance appeared in cameos, playing themselves. The film was released on 3 July 2009.

Sabbir Khan then directed Heropanti. It was a remake of the 2008 Telugu romantic drama, Parugu. It starred Tiger Shroff and Kriti Sanon in their Hindi film debuts, alongside Prakash Raj in a supporting role. The film was released Worldwide on 23 May 2014.

Sabbir Khan's next was Baaghi. It was produced by Sajid Nadiadwala, under Nadiadwala Grandson Entertainment. It was third successive film with Khan. It starred Tiger Shroff, Shraddha Kapoor, and Sudheer Babu, in his Hindi debut. Khan reunited with Tiger Shroff, for the third time, for Munna Michael, starring Nidhi Agerwal and Nawazuddin Siddiqui in the lead roles. It was produced by Viki Rajani and Eros International. The film was released on 21 July 2017.

Khan's next film was Nikamma, is a 2022 Indian Hindi-language action comedy film starring Abhimanyu Dassani, Shirley Setia, and Shilpa Shetty. It was a remake of Middle Class Abbayi.

== Filmography ==
Year	Title	Director	Producer	Writer	Notes
2009	Kambakkht Ishq	Yes	No	Yes	Debut
2014	Heropanti	Yes	No	No	
2016	Baaghi	Yes	No	No	
2017	Munna Michael	Yes	No	No	
2022	Nikamma	Yes	Yes	Screenplay	
2024	Adbhut	Yes	Yes	Yes	
2027	Laajawaab	Yes	Yes	No	
