= Baaghi 4 =

2025 Indian film by A. Harsha

- Theatrical release poster
- Directed by: A. Harsha
- Written by: Sajid Nadiadwala; Rajat Arora
- Based on: Ainthu Ainthu Ainthu by Sasi
- Produced by: Sajid Nadiadwala
- Starring: Tiger Shroff; Sanjay Dutt; Harnaaz Sandhu; Sonam Bajwa
- Cinematography: Swamy J. Gowda
- Edited by: Kiran Gowda; Nitin Pathak
- Music by: Songs: See Soundtrack; Score: Sanchit Balhara and Ankit Balhara
- Production company: Nadiadwala Grandson Entertainment
- Distributed by: Pen Marudhar
- Release date: 5 September 2025
- Running time: 157 minutes
- Country: India
- Language: Hindi
- Budget: ₹80 crore
- Box office: est. ₹66.39 crore

Baaghi 4 (transl. Rebel 4) is a 2025 Indian Hindi-language action thriller film directed by A. Harsha in his Hindi film debut, and produced by Sajid Nadiadwala under Nadiadwala Grandson Entertainment. The film stars Tiger Shroff, Sanjay Dutt, Harnaaz Sandhu (in her Hindi film debut) and Sonam Bajwa. It is the fourth installment in the Baaghi film series. It is an unofficial remake of the 2013 Tamil film Ainthu Ainthu Ainthu. In the film, a grieving man awakens from a coma and sets out to uncover the truth about his missing girlfriend who nobody believes even exists.

Baaghi 4 was released theatrically on 5 September 2025. The film was panned by critics, who criticized its story, screenplay, direction and graphic violence but praised the action sequences. It was a box-office bomb, grossing ₹ 67 crore worldwide at the box office.

== Plot ==
After surviving an attempted suicide by a train, a grief-stricken man descends into chaos as reality blurs. His loved ones question what's real while a hidden truth draws him into a web of obsession and enduring love.

Ranveer "Ronnie" Pratap Singh, an Indian naval officer, ends up in a massive car accident and goes in a coma. Seven months later he gains consciousness and lives in a depressive state. One night, a drunken and high Ronnie disrupts a funeral and proceeds to brutally beat most of the attendees when they try to restrain him. The next morning, Ronnie's therapist Dr. Anand Pal Singh and his brother Jeetu show him a video clip showing Ronnie hitting nothing but empty air, revealing he is suffering from major hallucinations and only imagined the entire fight. Dr. Singh privately asks Jeetu if he has a hunch on Ronnie's sudden depression, to which Jeetu states that Ronnie keeps telling him that his supposed girlfriend Alisha was killed in the crash but that there wasn't another body in Ronnie's car, that Jeetu personally never met Alisha and feels that Alisha never existed and it was too hallucinations, which Ronnie feels around him. The matter goes to police when Ronnie tries to attack a lady; he tries to prove everyone that Alisha existed and before his accident they spent time together. But whatever he tries to prove about Alisha's existence has no evidence. During this phase he finds solace in Olivia who tries to help him.

Ronnie reaches Alisha's house which is in an abandoned state, where he is attacked by many masked men and he realizes that it's all real and nothing about hallucinations. Ronnie manages to overcome all masked men. He then realizes that a powerful person is controlling everything and has erased Alisha's existence.

== Cast ==
- Tiger Shroff as Ranveer "Ronnie" Pratap Singh
- Sanjay Dutt as Chacko
- Harnaaz Sandhu in a dual role as
  - Dr. Alisha Pratap Singh, Ranveer's wife
  - Avantika, Chacko's fiancée
- Sonam Bajwa as Olivia / Prathistha
- Shreyas Talpade as Jeetendra "Jeetu" Pratap Singh, Ronny's brother
- Mahesh Thakur as Dr. Anand Pal Singh
- Saurabh Sachdeva as Paulo, Chacko's brother
- Upendra Limaye as HBP
- Sunit Morarjee as Inspector Sharad Kute
- Sheeba Akashdeep Sabir as Catherine
- Sudesh Lehri as Pali Pehelwan
- Melvin Louis as Peter
- Nikhat Khan as Christy
- Vishal Singh as Pedro
- Prashant Sindhu as Wilson
- Rajen Sanathara as Pandit

== Production ==
=== Development ===
The film was announced on 18 November 2024 by Tiger Shroff and Nadiadwala Grandson Entertainment.

=== Casting ===
Sanjay Dutt was cast as the antagonist. Sonam Bajwa and Harnaaz Sandhu were cast as the leading actresses.

=== Filming ===
The principal photography for the film began on 18 November 2024, and wrapped up on 9 July 2025.

== Soundtrack ==
Baaghi 4

Soundtrack album by Tanishk Bagchi, Agaazz, Josh Brar, Salamat Ali Matoi, Mani Moudgill, Badshah, Payal Dev, Aditya Dev, Siddhaant Miishhraa, Suyyash-Sidhaarth and Gourov Dasgupta
- Released: 3 September 2025
- Genre: Feature film soundtrack
- Length: 35:15
- Language: Hindi
- Label: T-Series
- Producer: Bhushan Kumar
External audio
- Official Audio Jukebox on YouTube

The film soundtrack was composed by Tanishk Bagchi, Agaazz, Josh Brar, Salamat Ali Matoi, Mani Moudgill, Badshah, Payal Dev, Aditya Dev, Siddhaant Miishhraa, Suyyash-Sidhaarth and Gourov Dasgupta with lyrics written by Sameer Anjaan, Kumaar, Jagdeep Warring, Josh Brar, Mani Moudgill, Badshah, Danish Sabri, Paradox, Gopi Sidhu, Star Boy Loc and Farhan Memon. The film score was composed by Sanchit Balhara and Ankit Balhara, who replaced franchise regular Julius Packiam. The music rights of the film ware acquired by T-Series. The first single titled "Guzaara" was released on 18 August 2025. The second single titled "Bahli Sonhi" was released on 22 August 2025. The third single titled "Akeli Laila" was released on 26 August 2025. The fourth single titled "Yeh Mera Husn" was released on 2 September 2025. The fifth single titled "Marjaana" was released on 4 September 2025.

Track listing
No.	Title	Lyrics	Music	Singer(s)	Length
1.	"Guzaara"	Kumaar, Jagdeep Warring, Josh Brar	Agaazz, Josh Brar, Salamat Ali Matoi	Josh Brar, Parampara Tandon	4:04
2.	"Bahli Sohni"	Mani Moudgill, Badshah	Mani Moudgill, Badshah	Mani Moudgill, Badshah, Nikhita Gandhi	3:01
3.	"Akeli Laila"	Danish Sabri, Paradox	Payal Dev, Aditya Dev	Payal Dev, Paradox	2:48
4.	"Yeh Mera Husn"	Sameer Anjaan	Tanishk Bagchi	Shilpa Rao	3:59
5.	"Marjaana"	Sameer Anjaan	Siddhaant Miishhraa	B Praak, Siddhaant Miishhraa	5:18
6.	"Get Ready to Fight - Khauf Hai"	Gopi Sidhu, Star Boy Loc	Suyyash-Sidhaarth	Suyyash Rai, Krishna Beuraa	3:10
7.	"Maar Maar"	Star Boy Loc	Suyyash-Sidhaarth	Star Boy Loc, Suyyash Rai	3:38
8.	"Rona Sikha Diya"	Farhan Memon	Gourov Dasgupta	Parampara Tandon	3:58
9.	"Tera Khayal"	Sameer Anjaan	Siddhaant Miishhraa	Stebin Ben	5:19
Total length:					35:15

== Marketing ==
The first look poster was released on 18 November 2024. The teaser was released on 11 August 2025. The trailer was released on 30 August 2025.

== Release ==
=== Theatrical ===
Baaghi 4 was released on 5 September 2025.

The film received an A certificate (Adults only) from the Central Board of Film Certification (CBFC) for strong violence. However, 23 cuts were made to the film's content. The makers further trimmed the film's runtime post-certification, bringing it down to 157 minutes from the earlier 163 minutes.

=== Home media ===
The film began streaming on Amazon Prime Video from 31 October 2025.

== Reception ==
Baaghi 4 was panned by critics. Bollywood Hungama rated the film 3 stars out of 5 and wrote "On the whole, BAAGHI 4 impresses in its first half with gripping action and engaging drama. The second half takes a more commercial route with an emphasis on songs and heightened emotions, catering largely to mass audiences. At the box office, the film is well-positioned to take a strong start at the box office, driven by its franchise value and star appeal. Its long-term performance, however, will hinge on word of mouth and repeat audience pull." Saibal Chatterjee of NDTV rated the film 2.5 stars out of 5 and called it "strictly for Tiger Shroff fans".

Dhaval Roy of The Times of India rated the film 2 stars out of 5 and wrote "Baaghi 4 relies on stylised action but often goes overboard. It also fails to back it up with a gripping story, leaving this franchise outing more exhausting than entertaining." Tanmayi Savadi of Times Now rated the film 2 stars out of 5 and wrote "The slow-mos and cheesy romance offer nothing new. The story confuses between being gritty and superficially staged. Action pieces, walking and dancing shots are stitched together aimlessly, creating a broken and weak narrative."

Shachi Chaturvedi of News18 rated the film 2 stars out of 5 and wrote "Violence? Over the top. Story? Barely there. Acting? Suffocated by poor writing. Baaghi 4 delivers clichés, making the film feel more like an exhausting action reel than a coherent drama. Best advice? Save yourself." Vinamra Mathur of Firstpost rated the film 1.5 stars out of 5 and wrote "It's a film that's so pretentious in its telling that swag soon turns into silliness. It's a film where the editing is so inconsistent that you lose interest in the action even before it begins."

Vineeta Kumar of India Today rated the film 1 star out of 5 and wrote "This is plain bad cinema, you see. There's no grey area here. You can't defend 'Baaghi 4'. Action, romance, settings, costumes - everything simply crumbles into nothingness, led by the most bizarre story you've ever been subjected to, and an even ridiculous treatment." Shalini Langer of The Indian Express rated the film 1 star out of 5 and wrote "One star to Tiger Shroff film for surprising us every time we think Ronny surely has butchered enough, or when you think Sanjay Dutt can't be doing his maniacal laugh one more time."

Rishabh Suri of Hindustan Times rated the film 2 stars out of 5 and wrote "I was reminded of the classic 'dabbe mein dabba' prank. You keep opening box after box, expecting treasure, only to end up with nothing. This film is the same, except at the end, you get a mirror, forcing you to stare at your own delusion that the film could be better than the trailer."
