= Producers Guild Film Award for Best Actress in a Drama Series =

Annual Indian film award

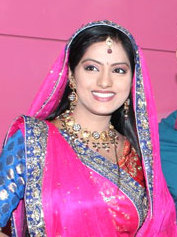
- 2015 Recipient Deepika Singh
- Awarded for: Best Performance by an Actress in a Lead Role on Television
- Sponsored by: Film & Television Producers Guild (Mumbai, India)
- First award: 2003
- Final award: 2015

Highlights
- Total awarded: 10
- First winner: Mona Singh, for Jassi Jaissi Koi Nahin (2003)
- Last winner: Deepika Singh, for Diya Aur Baati Hum (2015)

Producers Guild Film Award for Best Actress in a Drama Series is an award given by Apsara Producers Guild to recognize excellence in film and television, to recognize a male actor in television drama series who has delivered an outstanding performance in a leading role.

The award was first awarded in 2003 under the title Best Actress in a Drama Series and is awarded every year annually thereafter.

== Superlatives ==
Superlative	Actor	Record
Maximum Awards	Sakshi Tanwar, Ankita Lokhande	2
Maximum Nominations	Sakshi Tanwar, Ankita Lokhande	3

== Multiple winners ==
- 2 Wins: Sakshi Tanwar, Ankita Lokhande
- 1 Win: Mona Singh, Niki Aneja Walia, Tina Datta, Ragini Khanna, Drashti Dhami, Deepika Singh

== Multiple nominations ==
- 3 Nominations: Sakshi Tanwar, Ankita Lokhande
- 2 Nominations: Niki Aneja Walia, Rashami Desai, Divyanka Tripathi, Deepika Singh

== Winners ==
Year	Result	Actor	Role	Show
2004
2004	Winner	Mona Singh	Jassi	Jassi Jaissi Koi Nahin
2004	Nominated	Niki Aneja Walia	Dr Simran Mathur	Astitva...Ek Prem Kahani
2004	Nominated	Sangeeta Ghosh	Parminder Kaur	Des Mein Niklla Hoga Chand
2005	Not Held			
2006
2006	Winner	Niki Aneja Walia	Dr Simran Mathur	Astitva...Ek Prem Kahani
2006	Nominated	Mona Singh	Jassi	Jassi Jaissi Koi Nahin
2006	Nominated	Ratna Pathak	Maya Sarabhai	Sarabhai vs Sarabhai
2006	Nominated	Supriya Pathak	Hansa Parekh	Instant Khichdi
2006	Nominated	Divya Dutta	Shanno	Shanno Ki Shaadi
2007	Not Held			
2008	Nominated	Mugdha Chaphekar	Samyukta	Dharti Ka Veer Yodha Prithviraj Chauhan
2008	Nominated	Divyanka Tripathi	Vidya Singh	Banoo Main Teri Dulhann
2008	Nominated	Sarita Joshi	Godavari Thakkar	Baa Bahoo Aur Baby
2008	Nominated	Suhasi Dhami	Urmila Mehta	Aek Chabhi Hai Padoss Mein
2008	Nominated	Surveen Chawla	Kaajjal Behl	Kaajjal
2009	N/A			
2010
2010	Winner	Tina Datta	Iccha Bundela	Uttaran
2010	Nominated	Reena Kapoor	Rani/Pari	Woh Rehne Waali Mehlon Ki
2010	Nominated	Ratan Rajput	Lalli	Agle Janam Mohe Bitiya Hi Kijo
2010	Nominated	Parul Chauhan	Ragini Rajvansh	Sapna Babul Ka...Bidaai
2010	Nominated	Ashita Dhawan	Bubbly Chadda	Ladies Special
2011	Nominated			
2011	Winner	Ankita Lokhande	Archana Deshmukh	Pavitra Rishta
2011	Nominated	Rashami Desai	Tapasya Thakur	Uttaran
2011	Nominated	Reena Kapoor	Rani/Pari	Woh Rehne Waali Mehlon Ki
2011	Nominated	Pooja Gor	Pratigya	Mann Kee Awaaz Pratigya
2011	Nominated	Disha Vakani	Daya Gada	Taarak Mehta Ka Ooltah Chashmah
2012
2012	Winner	Sakshi Tanwar	Priya Ram Kapoor	Bade Achhe Lagte Hain
2012	Winner	Ragini Khanna	Suhani Kashyap	Sasural Genda Phool
2012	Nominated	Rashami Desai	Tapasya Thakur	Uttaran
2012	Nominated	Surekha Sikri	Dadisa	Balika Vadhu
2012	Nominated	Hina Khan	Akshara Singhania	Yeh Rishta Kya Kehlata Hai
2013
2013	Winner	Sakshi Tanwar	Priya Ram Kapoor	Bade Achhe Lagte Hain
2013	Nominated	Ankita Lokhande	Archana Manav Deshmukh	Pavitra Rishta
2013	Nominated	Kirti Nagpure	Sidhi Kunal Chopra	Parichay – Nayee Zindagi Kay Sapno Ka
2013	Nominated	Toral Rasputra	Anandi Shekhar	Balika Vadhu
2013	Nominated	Dipika Kakar	Simar Prem Bhardwaj	Sasural Simar Ka
2014
2014	Winner	Ankita Lokhande	Archana Manav Deshmukh	Pavitra Rishta
2014	Winner	Drashti Dhami	Madhu	Madhubala – Ek Ishq Ek Junoon
2014	Nominated	Sakshi Tanwar	Priya Ram Kapoor	Bade Achhe Lagte Hain
2014	Nominated	Paridhi Sharma	Jodhabai	Jodha Akbar
2014	Nominated	Deepika Singh	Sandhya Rathi	Diya Aur Baati Hum
2014	Nominated	Divyanka Tripathi	Dr. Ishita Bhalla	Ye Hai Mohabbatein
2015
2015	Winner	Deepika Singh	Sandhya Rathi	Diya Aur Baati Hum
