= Santhana Krishnan Ravichandran =

Indian cinematographer

- Education: LASALLE College of the Arts
- Occupation: Cinematographer
- Spouse: Manini Mishra (married 2023–present)

Santhana Krishnan Ravichandran is an Indian cinematographer who predominantly works in the Hindi film industry. His debut film Two Countries (2015) was in Malayalam, directed by Shafi and Bollywood debut with Tiger Shroff's Baaghi 2 (2018).

== Personal life ==
Krishnan is the eldest son of Ravi K. Chandran. On 29 June 2023, Krishnan married Manini Mishra in Park Hyatt Chennai, Tamil Nadu.

== Filmography ==
=== As cinematographer ===
Year	Film	Language	Notes
2015	Two Countries	Malayalam	
2018	Baaghi 2	Hindi	
2018	NOTA	Tamil	
2019	Kabir Singh	Hindi	
2020	Baaghi 3	Hindi	
2023	Tu Jhoothi Main Makkaar	Hindi	
2023	Sesham Mike-il Fathima	Malayalam	
2025	Sky Force	Hindi	
2025	Param Sundari	Hindi	
2026	Cocktail 2	Hindi	

=== As additional cinematographer ===
Year	Film	Language	Notes
2024	Munjya	Hindi	All songs
2024	Bad Newz	Hindi	1 song: "Tauba Tauba"
2024	Stree 2	Hindi	1 song: "Aayi Nai"
