= Heropanti 2 =

2022 Indian film by Ahmed Khan

- Theatrical release poster
- Directed by: Ahmed Khan
- Written by: Rajat Arora
- Story by: Sajid Nadiadwala
- Produced by: Sajid Nadiadwala
- Starring: Tiger Shroff; Nawazuddin Siddiqui; Tara Sutaria
- Cinematography: Kabir Lal
- Edited by: Rameshwar S. Bhagat
- Music by: A. R. Rahman
- Production company: Nadiadwala Grandson Entertainment
- Distributed by: AA Films
- Release date: 29 April 2022
- Running time: 142 minutes
- Country: India
- Language: Hindi
- Budget: ₹70 crore
- Box office: est. ₹35.13 crore

Heropanti 2 (transl. Heroic antics 2) is a 2022 Indian Hindi-language action film directed by Ahmed Khan, written by Rajat Arora and produced by Sajid Nadiadwala under the banner of Nadiadwala Grandson Entertainment. The film serves as a spiritual sequel to the 2014 film Heropanti. It stars Tiger Shroff, Nawazuddin Siddiqui and Tara Sutaria.

It was released on 29 April 2022 to negative reviews from critics, with criticism towards the story, screenplay, direction, and the cast performances, especially of the lead pair, emerging as a box-office bomb.

== Plot ==
RJ is an innocent young man who lives with his mother Hema in Yorkshire and works as a bouncer in a bar. RJ leaves for a job interview where Inaaya, a self-made millionaire from the gaming industry, sees RJ and alleges that he is her ex-boyfriend Babloo Ranawat. RJ makes it clear that he doesn't know her at all. However, Inaaya's suspicion turns out to be true. Babloo was an infamous hacker recruited by CBI officer Azaad Khan, who offers him a handsome reward to help them in thwarting the plans of Laila, who is a psychopathic magician and cyber-criminal. Laila has designed an app which steals the data of the users and also usurps the money from their bank accounts.

Babloo infiltrates Laila's gang by wooing Laila's sister Inaaya and begins into getting a good impression of Laila and also gets lured by the money offered by him and betrays Azaad, but soon realizes that the latter is achieving to destroy lives when he meets an ambulance driver's wife Hema where he learns that her husband had saved money for his grandson's education and their dreams, but learns that their bank account had been hacked and the money went missing. Due to this, the driver committed suicide. Due to guilt, Babloo rejoins Azaad and subdues the henchmen and destroys the app's transaction. He fakes his identity as RJ and leaves to start a new life along with his adopted mother Hema.

In the present day, Laila learns that Babloo is hiding in Yorkshire and sends his men to nab him, but Babloo subdues them and fakes his death again. Babloo reveals to Inaaya about Laila's crimes, who joins him in the fight. Babloo leaves for Egypt, Russia and China where Laila had established his crime syndicate and kills the syndicate members. Babloo and Inaaya leaves for Heathrow Airport to receive Hema (Hema had left Bablu to visit Kedar Ghat, India). Laila orders his henchmen to kidnap Babloo's mother and Laila challenges Babloo to stop the extraction of money by throwing various challenges. Babloo overcomes various challenges where he defeats Laila and stops the extraction and leaves with Inaaya and Hema. Humiliated by the defeat, Laila commits suicide. 6 months later, Babloo, Inaaya and Babloo's mother are living in Vietnam where a mission awaits for Babloo.

== Cast ==
- Tiger Shroff as Babloo Ranawat / RJ
- Nawazuddin Siddiqui as Laila
- Tara Sutaria as Inaaya
- Zakir Hussain as Azaad Khan
- Amrita Singh as Hema, Babloo's mother
- Naresh Gosain as Dogra
- Kecha as Wong
- Oliver as Zahid Malik
- Vikas Verma as Ustad
- Udayabhanu Maheshwaran as Hussain
- Mark Smith as Mark
- Sajjad Delafrooz as Ranjit Shenoy
- Saharsh Kumar Shukla as Babloo’s friend
- Kanwalpreet Singh as Babloo’s friend
- Nikul Bhupinder Singh Sachdev as Babloo’s friend
- Pankaj Kansara as Babloo’s friend
- Navneet Malik as Inaaya’s boyfriend
- Kriti Sanon Special appearance in song "Whistle Baja 2.0"

== Production ==
Principal photography began in the first week of June 2021. and first schedule was wrapped up in October 2021.

== Soundtrack ==
Heropanti 2

Soundtrack album by A.R. Rahman
- Released: 3 May 2022
- Genre: Feature film soundtrack
- Length: 23:53
- Language: Hindi
- Labels: T-Series; Saregama Music

A.R. Rahman chronology
| Atrangi Re (2021) | Heropanti 2 (2022) | Mili (2022) |

Official audio
- Heropanti 2 - Full Album on YouTube

The film's music was composed by A.R. Rahman with lyrics written by Mehboob.

The song "Whistle Baja 2.0" was recreated by A.R. Rahman from the track "Whistle Baja" from 2014 film Heropanti which was sung by Manj Musik, Nindy Kaur, Raftaar and written by Raftaar.

Track listing
| No. | Title | Singer(s) | Length |
|---|---|---|---|
| 1. | "Dafa Kar" | A.R. Rehman, Hiral Viradia | 3:59 |
| 2. | "Jalwanuma" | Pooja Tiwari, Javed Ali | 3:45 |
| 3. | "Miss Hairan" | Tiger Shroff, Nisa Shetty | 3:34 |
| 4. | "Whistle Baja 2.0" | Mika Singh, Neeti Mohan | 2:48 |
| 5. | "Rehnuma" | A.R. Rahman, Swagath Rathod, Faiz Mustafa | 6:24 |
| 6. | "Mauka Parast" | Mayank Kapri, Thoughts For Now | 3:23 |
| Total length: | | | 23:53 |

== Reception ==
=== Box office ===
Heropanti 2 earned ₹6.50 crore at the domestic box office on its opening day. On the second day, the film collected ₹5.50 crore. On the third day, the film collected ₹4 crore, taking total domestic weekend collection to ₹16 crore.

As of 12 May 2022 the film had a gross collection of ₹29.11 crore in India and ₹6.02 crore overseas, for a worldwide gross collection of ₹35.13 crore.

=== Critical response ===
Heropanti 2 received negative reviews from critics and audience.

Tanushree Roy of India Today gave the film a rating of 3/5 and wrote "Tiger Shroff, Tara Sutaria and Nawazuddin Siddiqui's Heropanti 2 is a paisa vasool entertainer. But, it comes with its own flaws". Taran Adarsh of Bollywood Hungama gave the film a rating of 3/5 and wrote "Despite lavish production value and fantastic stunts by Tiger Shroff, HEROPANTI 2 suffers from a poor storyline". Archika Khurana of The Times of India gave the film a rating of 2.5/5 and wrote "Heropanti 2 offers a little bit of everything—action, drama, music, romance and exotic locations". A Reviewer from Pinkvilla gave the film a rating of 1.5/5 and wrote "Tiger Shroff doesn’t even try to act in this one. It lacks everything that a “genuine commercial film” warrant – heroism, thrill, romance, emotion, comedy, and action. Nandini Ramnath of Scroll.in gave the film a rating of 1/5. Shubhra Gupta of The Indian Express gave the film a rating of 1/5 and wrote "This film has no plot. It’s basically a series of set pieces featuring Tiger Shroff prancing, romancing, and dancing, when he is not mowing down bunches of baddies". Saibal Chatterjee of NDTV gave the film a rating of 1/5 and wrote "This is a smashup of a film built upon a heap of inanities that grows bigger every passing minute. Neither Tiger nor Nawazuddin can salvage it".

== Release ==
=== Theatrical ===
Heropanti 2 was released theatrically on 29 April 2022.

=== Home media ===
The film was premiered on Amazon Prime Video from 27 May 2022.
