= Zulm Ki Hukumat =

1992 film by Bharat Rangachary

- Directed by: Bharat Rangachary
- Written by: Faiz-Saleem, Anees Bazmee
- Produced by: Sajid Nadiadwala, Kamlesh Chugh
- Starring: Dharmendra; Moushumi Chatterjee; Govinda; Kimi Katkar; Shakti Kapoor; Neena Gupta; Raza Murad; Paresh Rawal
- Narrated by: Amitabh Bachchan
- Cinematography: Nirmal Jani
- Edited by: Deepak Wirkud; M. D. Worlikar
- Music by: Dilip Sen-Sameer Sen
- Production company: Nadiadwala Theatre Productions
- Release date: 17 July 1992
- Running time: 153 minutes
- Country: India
- Language: Hindi

Zulm Ki Hukumat (transl. Tyrannical rule) is a 1992 Indian Hindi-language action crime film directed by Bharat Rangcharay and produced by Sajid Nadiadwala. The film stars Dharmendra, Govinda, Moushumi Chatterjee, Kimi Katkar, Shakti Kapoor, Neena Gupta, Paresh Rawal and Archana Puran Singh. The film is a remake of the 1972 American film The Godfather. The story revolves around an underworld don and his younger brother.

Zulm Ki Hukumat released worldwide on 17 July 1992,

== Plot ==
Pitamber Koli lives a powerful mafia boss existence with his wife and two brothers, Yeshwant and Pratap. Pratap is not like the business of his brothers hence he choose another path and lived separately. The trio get in the bad books of another crime boss named Swami, whose offer of drug business is rejected by Pitamber Koli. As a result, Pitamber is killed, and Yeshwant is seriously injured due to firing on them. Pratap takes the place of his elder brother Pitamber and joins the hand with Swami only to avenge the death of his brother. As soon as Swami get to know the true intentions of Pratap, he makes his move - Pratap's sister and brother-in-law are abducted and held at gunpoint. When Yeshwant goes to rescue them, he is gunned down. Now Pratap, the only remaining Koli brother, is the only target of Swami. How Swami entraps Prat, who will be quite helpless, especially with his sister still a captive with Swami, forms the crux of the story.

== Cast ==
- Dharmendra as Pitamber Koli
- Moushumi Chatterjee Wife of Pitamber Koli
- Govinda as Pratap Koli (Brother of Pitamber)
- Kimi Katkar as Kiran, Pratap's Wife
- Shakti Kapoor as Yashwant Koli (Pritamber & Pratap's Brother)
- Paresh Rawal as Swami
- Neena Gupta as Yashwant's Wife
- Imtiaz Khan as Natwar Soorma
- Raza Murad as Captain
- Mushtaq Khan as Prabhakar
- Amita Nangia as Kusum, Sister of Pitamber and Pratap Koli
- Navin Nischol as Kusum Father in Law
- Archana Puran Singh as Chitra
- Sharat Saxena as Reddy
- Amrit Pal as Tandiya
- Mahesh Anand as Tandiya's Son
- Sudhir Dalvi as Police Commissioner
- Beena Banerjee as Kiran's Mother
- Salim Ghouse as Police Inspector Tiger Suryavanshi, friend of Pratap
- Dinesh Hingoo as Bahadur, Guest House Manager
- Guddi Maruti as Kiran's Friend
- Kishore Bhanushali as Pratap's Friend

== Reception ==
India Today wrote: "Although Dharmendra is a pale shadow of Brando and Govinda tries his best to ape Pacino, this desi godfather comes as a pleasant surprise."

== Music ==
"O Dilruba" was written by Anwar Sagar and the rest were written by Sameer Anjaan.

| Song | Singer |
|---|---|
| "Kathmandu Kathmandu" | Kumar Sanu |
| "Chiklo Chiklo" | Alka Yagnik, Amit Kumar |
| "Hum Aap Ki Zulfon Se Khele" | Asha Bhosle, Amit Kumar |
| "O Dilruba Humse Ankh To Mila" | Kavita Krishnamurthy |
| "Yaha Zulm Ki Hukumat Hai" | Kavita Krishnamurthy |
