= Kik =

Kik or KIK may refer to:

== Organisations ==
- KiK, a textile discounter based in Bönen, Germany
- KIK FM, a dance music station located in Darwin, Australia
- Klub Inteligencji Katolickiej, a Polish organization grouping Catholic intellectuals

== Other uses ==
- County Kilkenny, Ireland, Chapman code KIK
- Kik, Croatia, a village near Lovinac
- Kik (app), instant messenger application for smartphones
- The Kik, a Dutch music group
- Kik Pierie, Dutch football player
- Kill It Kid, a British band
- KIK, a South Korean band led by Wooseok

== See also ==
- Kick (disambiguation)
- Kiks Tyo, a Japanese fashion brand
- KIKS-FM, an American radio station
