= Baaghi 3 =

2020 Indian film by Ahmed Khan

- Theatrical release poster
- Directed by: Ahmed Khan
- Written by: Farhad Samji; Sparsh Khetarpal; Tasha Bhambra; Madhur Sharma
- Based on: Vettai by N. Lingusamy
- Produced by: Sajid Nadiadwala
- Starring: Tiger Shroff; Ritesh Deshmukh; Shraddha Kapoor; Ankita Lokhande
- Cinematography: Santhana Krishnan Ravichandran
- Edited by: Rameshwar S. Bhagat
- Music by: Score: Julius Packiam; Songs: Bappi Lahiri; Vishal-Shekhar; Tanishk Bagchi; Rochak Kohli; Sachet-Parampara; Pranaay Rijia
- Production companies: Fox Star Studios; Nadiadwala Grandson Entertainment
- Distributed by: Fox Star Studios
- Release date: 6 March 2020 (India)
- Running time: 143 minutes
- Country: India
- Language: Hindi
- Budget: ₹85 crore
- Box office: ₹137.05 crore

Baaghi 3 is a 2020 Indian Hindi-language action thriller film directed by Ahmed Khan and produced by Sajid Nadiadwala under Nadiadwala Grandson Entertainment. Loosely inspired from the 2012 Tamil film Vettai, it stars Tiger Shroff, Riteish Deshmukh, and Shraddha Kapoor in lead roles. It is the third installment of the Baaghi film series. In the film, Ronnie goes to Syria to find his elder brother Vikram, who is kidnapped and held captive by Abu Jalal Gaza, a notorious terrorist.

Principal photography began on 12 September 2019 in Mumbai. The makers wanted to shoot in Syria, but Fox Star Studios declined due to safety issues, where sets resembling the Syrian topography were built in Serbia. The action sequences were handled by Ram-Lakshman and Kecha Khamphakdee.

Baaghi 3 was released on 6 March 2020 to mixed reviews from critics with praise for its action sequences and cinematography but criticised its script and direction. Despite the collections being affected due to COVID-19 pandemic, the film became the second highest grossing Hindi film of 2020 earning ₹137.05 crore (US$15 million) worldwide.

There were plans for a re-release once the outbreak would end, but the makers instead decided to instantly premiere it on Disney+ Hotstar.

== Plot ==
Ranveer "Ronnie" Charan Chaturvedi and his elder brother Vikram Charan Chaturvedi live a happy life in Agra. Ronnie has been protective towards Vikram since childhood, especially after the death of their father Charan Chaturvedi. Ronnie is offered a job in the IPS but refuses due to FIR cases registered against him for saving Vikram in trouble. Ronnie convinces Vikram to take on the job. Though timid and reluctant, Vikram becomes an IPS officer and rises to fame in his job by having Ronnie secretly punish suspects and save victims for him. Later, Ronnie falls in love with Siya and they get Vikram and Siya's sister Ruchi married to each other.

One day, Vikram is assigned to leave for Damascus, Syria for routine paperwork. Upon arriving, Vikram chats with Ronnie over a video call, but is suddenly attacked and kidnapped by henchmen sent by Abu Jalal Gaza, a notorious terrorist. Ronnie and Siya travel to Syria, where the local police refuses to help them. They meet Akhtar Lahori, who helps them track Vikram and his captors. They head to Vikram's hotel, while the cops start looking for the trio. In Vikram's room, Ronnie finds Vikram's damaged phone and escapes with Siya and Akhtar before the cops can catch them. The trio finds the attacker, who is revealed to be Abu Jalal's brother.

A chase ensues in which the exhausted attacker agrees to help before being killed by a truck. Siya retrieves the attacker's phone and texts a goon Inder Paheli Lamba alias IPL to meet at a hotel. Abu Jalal Gaza arrives to avenge his brother's death. A cop supports Ronnie and captures IPL, while Abu Jalal escapes. The trio and policemen lead Abu Jalal to believe that IPL Change side since he is Taken to Market and Given cash and Drunk with them and released, Abu Jalal orders his men to kill him. Ronnie and the cops cleverly stage the series of events that lead to Abu Jalal's men believing they have been betrayed by IPL. Upon being rescued by Ronnie from Abu Jalal's men, IPL decides to help him. Ronnie battles Abu Jalal's army before going to rescue Vikram and the hostages.

IPL sacrifices himself To save a child from landmine and Abu Jalal agrees to free everyone, but captures Siya. Ronnie fights Abu Jalal's men, but as Vikram starts getting enraged to see Ronnie getting brutally thrashed, Ronnie stops fighting and gets stabbed, causing a transformation in Vikram, who jumps out of the cell and brutally fights off everyone, finally impaling Abu Jalal on steel rods. Vikram and Siya try to wake up Ronnie. When Abu Jalal suddenly emerges to attack them from behind, Ronnie wakes up and kills him. Ronnie, Siya and Vikram return to Agra and Vikram is honoured for his bravery.

== Cast ==
- Tiger Shroff as Ranveer "Ronnie" Chaturvedi
  - Ayaan Zubair Rahmani as Young Ronnie
- Riteish Deshmukh as Inspector Vikram Chaturvedi
  - Yash Bhojwani as Young Vikram
- Shraddha Kapoor as Siya Nandan
- Ankita Lokhande as Ruchi Nandan Chaturvedi
- Jameel Khoury as Abu Jalal Gaza
- Amit Sharma as Bajwa
- Jaideep Ahlawat as Inder Paheli Lamba (IPL)
- Vijay Varma as Akhtar Lahori
- Satish Kaushik as Agra Police Commissioner
- Virendra Saxena as Head Constable Kailash Tripathi
- Ivan Kostadinov as Zaidi Jalal Gaza
- Manav Gohil as Asif Ali
- Sunit Morarjee as Inspector Sharad Kute
- Shriswara Dubey as Hafeeza Ali
- Danish Bhat as Inspector Bilal Al Khatib, Syria Police
- Shifuji Shaurya Bhardwaj as Arun Mishra
- Aekam Binjwe as Junaid Ali, Hafeeza & Asif’s son

=== Cameo appearance ===
- Jackie Shroff as Inspector Charan Chaturvedi; Ronnie and Vikram's late father
- Farhad Samji as a Man at the cinema hall's mens washroom
- Disha Patani as a bar dancer in the item song "Do You Love Me"

== Production ==
The film was announced on 19 December 2018 with Tiger Shroff by Nadiadwala Grandson Entertainment on their X account by releasing a teaser poster. On 12 February 2019, Shraddha Kapoor was signed to play the female lead. It was announced that Riteish Deshmukh has joined the cast of the film. The shooting of the film took place in Morocco, Egypt, Serbia and Turkey.

Principal photography began on 12 September 2019 in Mumbai and wrapped on 30 January 2020.

== Release ==
The film was theatrically released in India on 6 March 2020.

=== Home media ===
The digital rights of the film were sold to Disney+ Hotstar.

== Reception ==
=== Box office ===
Baaghi 3 earned ₹17.50 crore net at the domestic box office on the opening day, which was the highest opening day collection for 2020 Bollywood film. As of 15 March 2020, with a gross of ₹111.15 crore in India and ₹25.9 crore overseas, the film has a worldwide gross collection of ₹137.05 crore and became the second highest-grossing Bollywood film of 2020.

=== Critical response ===
Baaghi 3 received negative reviews from critics. On the review aggregator website Rotten Tomatoes, 0% of 12 critics' reviews are positive, with an average rating of 3.3/10.

Taran Adarsh of Bollywood Hungama gave 3/5 stars and wrote "Baaghi 3 has a terrific combination of Tiger Shroff’s powerful performance, superlative action and stunning visuals." Ronak Kotecha of The Times of India gave 2.5/5 stars and wrote "Director Ahmed Khan throws in every trick in the book to make ‘Baaghi 3’ an action entertainer." Rajeev Masand of News18 gave 2/5 stars and wrote "Tiger Shroff, who is the star attraction of the Baaghi films, is in reliably good form as the third installment hangs by a thread off its leading man’s strong shoulders."

== Soundtrack ==
Baaghi 3

Soundtrack album by Bappi Lahiri, Vishal–Shekhar, Tanishk Bagchi, Sachet–Parampara, Rochak Kohli and Pranaay Rijia
- Released: 14 February 2020
- Recorded: 2019
- Genre: Feature film soundtrack
- Length: 21:12
- Language: Hindi
- Label: T-Series
- Producers: Meghdeep Bose, Tanishk Bagchi, Sourav Roy, Aditya Dev and Sparsh Aggrawal
External audio
- Official Audio Jukebox on YouTube

The song "Dus Bahane 2.0" is a recreation of "Dus Bahane" from the film Dus by Vishal–Shekhar. This was the first time that the duo recreated one of their song. The music video for the song was shot in Mumbai, Rajasthan and Serbia.

The song "Bhankas" was a remake of the song "Ek Aankh Marun To" from the 1984 film Tohfa, was originally composed by Bappi Lahiri, with lyrics by Indeevar and sung by Kishore Kumar and Asha Bhosle, and was recreated by Tanishk Bagchi.

The song "Do You Love Me" is a recreation of British record producer TroyBoi's song, voiced by Nikhita Gandhi and written and composed by Bagchi.

Track listing
No.	Title	Lyrics	Music	Singer(s)	Length
1.	"Dus Bahane 2.0"	Panchhi Jalonvi	Vishal–Shekhar	Vishal Dadlani, Shekhar Ravjiani, KK, Shaan, Tulsi Kumar	3:21
2.	"Bhankas"	Shabbir Ahmed	Tanishk Bagchi, Bappi Lahiri	Bappi Lahiri, Dev Negi, Jonita Gandhi	2:38
3.	"Do You Love Me"	Tanishk Bagchi, Rene Bendali	Tanishk Bagchi, Rene Bendali	Nikhita Gandhi	2:42
4.	"Get Ready To Fight -Reloaded"	Ginny Diwan	Pranaay Rijia	Pranaay Rijia, Siddharth Basrur	2:51
5.	"Faaslon Mein"	Shabbir Ahmed	Sachet–Parampara	Sachet Tandon	4:41
6.	"Tujhe Rab Mana"	Gautam G Sharma, Gurpreet Saini	Rochak Kohli	Shaan	4:59
Total length:					21:12
