= Kicking, Austria =

Kicking in Austria may refer to:

- the catastral district of Peilstein im Mühlviertel in Upper Austria or
- the catastral district of Dunkelsteinerwald in Lower Austria
