= Tiger Shroff =

Indian actor (born 1990)

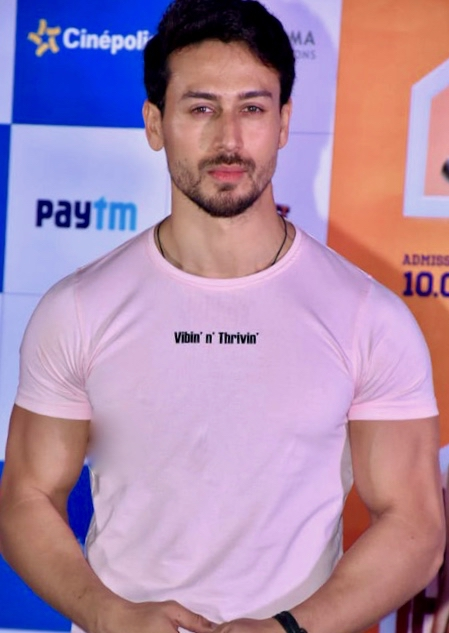
- Shroff in 2019
- Born: Jai Hemant Shroff; 2 March 1990 (age 36); Bombay, Maharashtra, India
- Occupation: Actor
- Years active: 2014–present
- Organisation: Matrix Fight Night
- Parents: Jackie Shroff (father); Ayesha Dutt (mother)
- Relatives: Krishna Shroff (sister); Ranjan Dutt (grandfather)

Jai Hemant "Tiger" Shroff (born 2 March 1990) is an Indian actor and singer, who works in Hindi films. Born to actors Jackie Shroff and Ayesha Dutt, he made his acting debut with the action romance Heropanti (2014), for which he won the IIFA Award for Star Debut of the Year – Male.

Shroff went on to star in the commercially successful action films Baaghi (2016), Baaghi 2 (2018), and War (2019). This was followed by a series of unsuccessful big-budget actions films such as Heropanti 2 (2021), Ganapath (2023) and Bade Miyan Chote Miyan (2024), Baaghi 4 (2025) which has in-turn led to a career decline.

In 2019, Shroff co-founded the mixed martial arts organisation Matrix Fight Night (MFN). He has featured in Forbes India's Celebrity 100 list in 2018 and 2019. As a singer, he has released several singles.

== Early life and background ==
Jai Hemant Shroff was born on 2 March 1990, to Indian film actor Jackie Shroff and his wife Ayesha Shroff (née Dutt), a film producer and former actress. He has a younger sister named Krishna Shroff. On his paternal side, he is of Gujarati and Turkmen ancestry while from his maternal side, he is of Bengali and Belgian descent. His maternal grandfather was Air Vice Marshal Ranjan Dutt, a Vir Chakra awardee.

Shroff is a devout Hindu devotee of Shiva and has attributed his physique to Shiva. He holds a fast every Monday and during every Mahashivaratri festival. He studied at the American School of Bombay.

Due to his experience in martial arts, he has frequently spent time helping other actors train for films. In 2014, he was awarded an honorary fifth degree black belt in Taekwondo.

== Career ==
=== Debut and success with action films (2014–2020) ===
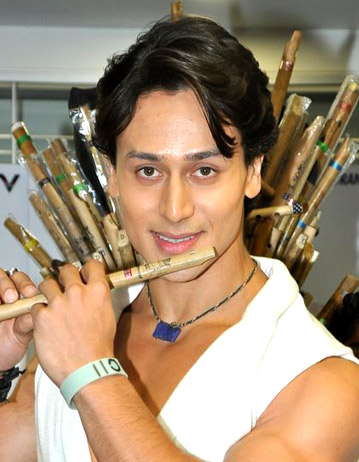
Shroff at an event for Heropanti in 2014

In 2012, Shroff was signed by producer Sajid Nadiadwala to make his film debut in Sabbir Khan's action romantic comedy Heropanti. To prepare for the role, he took flexibility training under Ziley Mawai. Released in 2014, Heropanti was a commercial success with a gross of ₹780 million (US$8.3 million) worldwide. He gained praise for his dancing skills, action sequences, physique and for the ability to perform stunts, but was also criticised for his acting, looks and dialogue delivery. Subhash K. Jha said that he "emotes, he dances and yes, he can fight". However, Sweta Kaushal of Hindustan Times disagreed, calling his "dialogues forced" and said "his expressions do nothing in a given situation". In spite of terming his performance "a little unconvincing", Kaushal called his action sequences "admirable" and said he's a "great dancer". Shroff's portrayal fetched him the Screen Award for Best Male Debut and the IIFA Award for Star Debut of the Year – Male in addition to a nomination in the same category at the 60th Filmfare Awards.

In 2016, Shroff reteamed with Nadiadwala and Sabbir in Baaghi (2016), set against the backdrop of a martial arts school while also featuring Shraddha Kapoor and Sudheer Babu. Earning ₹1.29 billion (US$14 million) in worldwide markets, Baaghi was also a success. That year he also played a martial arts teacher who gains superpowers, in Remo D'Souza's superhero film A Flying Jatt alongside Jacqueline Fernandez. In 2017, Shroff teamed with Sabbir for the third time in the dance film Munna Michael. Both A Flying Jatt and Munna Michael were unsuccessful at the box office.

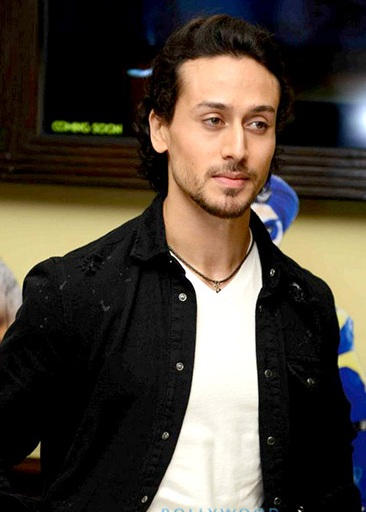
Shroff at a promotional event for A Flying Jatt (2016)

In 2018, Shroff appeared in Ahmed Khan's Baaghi 2, a spiritual sequel to Baaghi, and the second instalment of the Baaghi Film Series opposite Disha Patani. Produced by Nadiadwala, the film featured him as a rebellious army officer set on the mission to find his ex-girlfriend's missing daughter. Baaghi 2 grossed ₹1.65 billion (US$18 million) net domestically in India and over ₹2.58 billion (US$28 million) worldwide to become one of the top-grossing Bollywood films of the year.

In 2019, Shroff appeared in Punit Malhotra's teen drama Student of the Year 2, his first mainstream romantic drama. Produced by Karan Johar's Dharma Productions, it was a standalone sequel to Student of the Year and saw Shroff portray a college student who competes in an annual school championship. Rajeev Masand of News18 called his performance "the film's singular strength". Ronak Kotecha, from The Times of India, agreed by saying "Tiger Shroff pretty much carries the film on his well-toned shoulders".

Later in 2019, Shroff starred in Siddharth Anand's action thriller War alongside Hrithik Roshan. The film was the highest-grossing Bollywood film of the year and ranks as Shroff's highest-grossing release. The worldwide collection for War was 4.76 billion Indian rupees (US$63 Million) and 3.18 billion Indian rupees nett domestically in India. War recorded a record-breaking opening collecting over ₹53.35 crore.

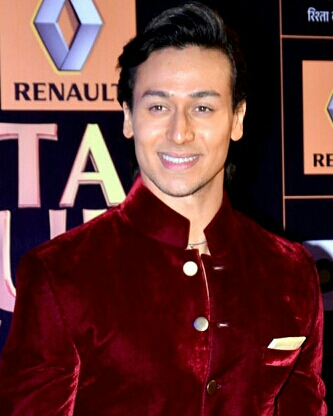
Shroff snapped during Star Guild Awards

In 2020, he starred in the third instalment of the Baaghi film series titled Baaghi 3, where he reunited with Shraddha Kapoor. The collections of the films were affected as theatres were shut due to the COVID-19 pandemic, but the film managed to earn 1.37 billion Indian Rupees worldwide.

=== Career decline (2021–present) ===
After no releases for 2021, Shroff starred in the 2022 action sequel to his debut film Heropanti 2, starring opposite Tara Sutaria. It received negative reviews from critics. The film also became a box-office bomb. In 2023, Shroff starred in a dual role of Ganapath/Dalini in Vikas Bahl's science fiction action film Ganapath, in which he reunited with Kriti Sanon. Bhavna Agarwal of India Today noted, "Tiger Shroff is great with action sequences, as always, but fails to evoke an emotional chord as Guddu/Ganapath." Once again, it was a major commercial failure.

In 2024, Shroff teamed with Akshay Kumar in Ali Abbas Zafar's action film Bade Miyan Chote Miyan, released on the occasion of Eid 2024. In a scathing review, Saibal Chatterjee dismissed the performances of both male leads. It performed poorly, marking Shroff's third consecutive box office disappointment. Shroff next made an appearance in Rohit Shetty's Cop Universe franchise in the ensemble action sequel Singham Again (2024), starring Ajay Devgn in the title role. It was released on Diwali 2024. Singham Again had modest box-office returns on its high production budget.

In 2025, Shroff starred in the action sequel Baaghi 4, directed by A. Harsha, in his Hindi directorial debut opposite debutante Harnaaz Sandhu. It also features Sanjay Dutt and Sonam Bajwa. In a review of Bollywood Hungama opined, "Shroff delivers a challenging performance "he shines in action", as always, but also does well in the "emotional sequences". While Vineeta Kumar of India Today panned the film and stating, "Shroff continues to experimenting with action, "he is a 14-film-old actor" still his acting skills are "constantly rerouting" and after a point painful to live with". The film underperformed at the box office, though it became his highest grossing film as a solo lead in the post pandemic era. It also became the lowest grossing film in the Baaghi film series.

He will next star in Raj Mehta's directorial Lag Jaa Gale opposite Janhvi Kapoor and Lakshya Lalwani under Dharma Productions.

== Other work ==
Tiger Shroff
Personal information
- Position: Forward

Team information
- Current team: Mumbay
- Number: 7

Senior career*
Years	Team	Apps	(Gls)
2024–2025	Mumbay	3	(0)
- * Club domestic league appearances and goals as of 13 November 2024

In 2017, Shroff was brought in as Brand Ambassador and co-owner of Bengaluru Tigers, which is owned by 8K Miles Media Group. The Bengaluru Tigers won third place in the inaugural season of Super Fight League, the first mixed martial arts (MMA) League in India. In 2018, Shroff was also made the Brand Ambassador of Prowl. He is also the brand ambassador of brands like Pepsi, ASICS India, Casio India, 8:00 PM Premium Black, Macho, Garnier, Forca, Great White Electronic. In 2020, Eastern Eye featured him in their dynamic dozen for the decade list. In 2024, Shroff was placed in the "35 most influential young Indians" list by GQ.

In 2023, Shroff performed in Doha for the "Entertainer No. 1" tour, alongside Shahid Kapoor, Varun Dhawan, Kiara Advani, Rakul Preet Singh, Jacqueline Fernandez and Ash King.

In 2024, Shroff launched the football club, Mumbay FC which would participate in the 2024–25 Mumbai Premier League, the top-tier football league run by the Mumbai Football Association in Mumbai, representing the fifth tier of the Indian football league system and also signed as a marquee player. He made his senior professional debut for the club in a 1–0 win over Bombay Gymkhana on 30 October 2024.

== Personal life ==
On 18 October 2026, in Juhu, three unidentified men on motorcycles opened fire at Shroff's vehicle. While Shroff escaped completely unhurt, the attack left two individuals injured. These people included streamer Umesh Chauhan and Shroff's personal driver.

Shroff later took the wheel and drove off. Shroff's driver was badly injured and was later admitted to Nanavati Hospital, where he underwent treatment.

== Filmography ==
=== Films ===
Key
†	Denotes films that have not yet been released

Year	Title	Role(s)	Notes	Ref
2014	Heropanti	Bablu Singh		
2016	Baaghi	Ranveer Pratap Singh		
2016	A Flying Jatt	Aman Dhillon		
2017	Munna Michael	Manav "Munna" Roy		
2018	Welcome to New York	Himself	Special appearance	
2018	Baaghi 2	Ranveer Pratap Singh		
2019	Student of the Year 2	Rohan Sachdev		
2019	War	Khalid Rahmani / Saurabh Patil (Note: Shroff played dual roles in the film.)		
2020	Baaghi 3	Ranveer Charan Chaturvedi		
2022	Heropanti 2	Babloo Ranawat		
2023	Ganapath	Ganapath / Dalini		
2024	Bade Miyan Chote Miyan	Rakesh		
2024	Singham Again	ACP Satya		
2025	Jahaan	Himself	Short film	
2025	Baaghi 4	Ranveer "Ronny" Pratap Singh		
2027	Lag Jaa Gale †	TBA	Filming	
2027	Untitled Remo D'Souza film †	TBA	Filming	

=== Dubbing ===
Year	Film title	Actor	Character	Dub Language	Original Language	Dub Year Release	Notes
2017	Spider-Man: Homecoming	Tom Holland	Peter Parker / Spider-Man	Hindi	English	2017	

== Discography ==
=== Singles ===
Year	Song	Notes	Ref.
2020	"Unbelievable"		
2021	"Casanova"		
2021	"Vande Mataram"		
2022	"Poori Gal Baat"		
2022	"Miss Hairan"	For Heropanti 2	
2023	"Love Stereo Again"	With Zahrah S. Khan	
2025	"Bepanaahh"		
2026	"Tenu Leke Jaana"		

== Awards and nominations ==
Year	Award	Category	Work	Result	Ref.
2014	Stardust Awards	Superstar of Tomorrow – Male	Heropanti	Won	
2014	BIG Star Entertainment Awards	Most Entertaining Debut Actor – Male	Heropanti	Won	
2014	Star Guild Awards	Best Male Debut	Heropanti	Won	
2015	ETC Bollywood Business Awards	Highest Grossing Debut Actor	Heropanti	Won	
2015	ETC Bollywood Business Awards	Most Promising Newcomer (Male)	Heropanti	Won	
2015	IIFA Awards	Star Debut of the Year – Male	Heropanti	Won	
2015	Filmfare Awards	Best Male Debut	Heropanti	Nominated	
2015	Screen Awards	Most Promising Newcomer – Male	Heropanti	Won	
2016	Nickelodeon Kids' Choice Awards India	Best Dancing Star	Baaghi	Won	
2017	Big Star Entertainment Awards	Most Entertaining Actor in an Action Film	Baaghi	Won	
2017	Big Star Entertainment Awards	Most Entertaining Dancer	A Flying Jatt	Won	
2019	Nickelodeon Kids' Choice Awards India	Favorite Movie Actor (Male)	Student of the Year 2	Nominated	
2022	Pinkvilla Style Icons Awards	Stylish Mould-Breaker - Male	—N/a	Nominated	
2023	Bollywood Hungama Style Icons	Most Stylish Actor (Male)	—N/a	Nominated	
2023	Bollywood Hungama Style Icons	Most Stylish Youth Icon (Male)	—N/a	Nominated	
2023	Lokmat Stylish Awards	Stylish Action Star	—N/a	Won	
2024	Pinkvilla Screen and Style Icons Awards	Stylish Action Star	—N/a	Won	
