= Kiick =

Kiick is a surname. Notable people with the surname include:

- Allie Kiick (born 1995), American tennis player
- George Kiick (1917–2002), American football player
- Jim Kiick (1946–2020), American football player
- Kristi Kiick (born 1967), American professor
