= Kick (2014 film) =

2014 Indian film by Sajid Nadiadwala

- Theatrical release poster
- Directed by: Sajid Nadiadwala
- Screenplay by: Rajat Arora; Keith Gomes; Sajid Nadiadwala; Chetan Bhagat
- Dialogues by: Rajat Arora
- Based on: Kick by Vakkantham Vamsi and Surender Reddy
- Produced by: Sajid Nadiadwala
- Starring: Salman Khan; Jacqueline Fernandez; Randeep Hooda; Nawazuddin Siddiqui; Mithun Chakraborty
- Cinematography: Ayananka Bose
- Edited by: Rameshwar S. Bhagat
- Music by: Score: Julius Packiam; Songs: Himesh Reshammiya; Meet Bros Anjjan; Yo Yo Honey Singh
- Production companies: UTV Motion Pictures; Nadiadwala Grandson Entertainment
- Distributed by: UTV Motion Pictures
- Release date: 25 July 2014 (India)
- Running time: 147 minutes
- Country: India
- Language: Hindi
- Budget: ₹140 crore
- Box office: est. ₹402 crore

Kick is a 2014 Indian Hindi-language action comedy film directed and produced by Sajid Nadiadwala in his directorial debut under the Nadiadwala Grandson Entertainment banner. The stars Salman Khan, Jacqueline Fernandez, Randeep Hooda and Nawazuddin Siddiqui in the lead roles. A remake of the eponymous 2009 Telugu original, it was made in collaboration with UTV Motion Pictures on a reported budget of ₹55 crore (US$5.7 million).

Rajat Arora scripted the film, apart from giving the screenplay alongside Nadiadwala, Chetan Bhagat and Keith Gomes. Released on 25 July 2014 coinciding with Eid, Kick grossed over ₹402 crore (US$42 million) worldwide and over 232 crores net domestically in India, becoming a blockbuster success and emerged as Khan's first film to enter 200 Crore Club and emerged as one of the biggest blockbusters of 2014. Kick has maintained a position among the top 50 highest-grossing Indian films for over a decade, from its release in 2014 to 2024. With a worldwide gross of ₹402 crore, it continues to be one of the most successful films in Indian cinema, reflecting its lasting popularity and widespread impact. The film received mixed to positive reviews with praise for the humor, the performances and soundtrack. A sequel named Kick 2 with the same cast & crew is under development.

== Plot ==
Dr. Shaina Mehra is a psychiatrist living in Warsaw, Poland. Her father, Brijesh, brings a marriage proposal and asks her to meet police officer Himanshu Tyagi, who is the son of a friend of Brijesh. The two meet on a train, where Shaina reveals she had an ex-boyfriend, Devi Lal Singh, and talks about her crazy experiences with him. Devi is shown to be intelligent and adventurous, always looking for a kick in his life. Shaina was helping her friend, Vidhi, elope with Devi's friend, Jignesh, when she met Devi in Delhi. After a long, hilarious chase, Devi got Vidhi and Jignesh married in a temple, but also helped Vidhi's mother reach the temple for a "kick". Shaina met Devi's family; the two began dating and fell in love. On her suggestion and after being ashamed by her father, Devi got a job in a chemical lab but resigned soon, suffering from the lack of a "kick". Devi tried hiding from Shaina that he was jobless again, but she soon discovered it. Shaina scolded him for not being able to earn money, and Devi broke up with her and said that his new "kick" is now to earn money. She has since shifted to Warsaw, having to entertain Brijesh and his desire to see her married.

Himanshu shares his experiences with a thief he hates as he cannot stop him; the robber, Devil, has been targeting the rich people associated with corrupt businessman Shiv Gajra, and is robbing them. Devil is actually Devi. As Himanshu fails to catch Devil, Devi contacts him and insults him by calling him a "loser", which is a clue that Devi gives Himanshu. While with Himanshu in Warsaw, Shaina spots Devi, who is there for treatment after losing his memory in an accident. She offers to handle Devi's case, which was referred by Dr. Jayant Verma, and take him home. However, Devi is in fact faking his memory loss; his real plan is to befriend and fool Himanshu and rob Shiv, who will come to Poland. Devi enters a charity function and robs Shiv, but Himanshu and Shaina discover the truth, and Devi is ultimately forced to drown himself. However, he escapes.

Devi's true intentions and good deeds are revealed by his father, Ratan Lal, telling Shaina that Devi is committing robberies to help poor children who are battling diseases. In a flashback, Devi saved a girl, Jhumki, after reading a letter in the hands of her dead parents, and got the most powerful kick when she smiled at him. When Dr. Verma told him that several such children are battling diseases, he decided to save them by robbing to get money for their treatments, knowing that it will give a lot of Kick. Back in the present, Himanshu tracks Devi down to a bar in Delhi and warns him he will be killed if he robs again, but Devi says he will rob a huge party fund on 14 November. He dares Himanshu to kill him on the 14th; otherwise, Devi will be standing in front of him on 15 November, and he will not be able to do anything.

On 14 November, Devi tricks Himanshu and his forces with his own hologram image, revealing he can create holographic images. After fighting Shiv's henchmen and robbing the money, Devi kills him. Himanshu is set up with officers to shoot Devi, but several kids block his shot. Himanshu realises the robberies were for the kids after a teacher informs him that the children are going to pray for their saviour and it's Children's Day. On 15 November, Devi joins the police force. He arrives at the police station and stands in front of Himanshu, who is unable to do anything about the situation, thereby completing his challenge. Himanshu is taken off the case, and it is given to Devi, who is now a police officer. Devi then thanks Himanshu, saying that he was never against him, but he is against the corrupt system.

== Cast ==
- Salman Khan as Devi Lal "Devil" Singh
- Jacqueline Fernandez as Dr. Shaina Mehra – a psychiatrist
- Randeep Hooda as ACP Himanshu Tyagi
- Nawazuddin Siddiqui as Shiv Gajra
- Mithun Chakraborty as Ratan Lal Singh, Devi's father
- Archana Puran Singh as Rati Lal Singh, Devi's mother
- Karan Aanand as Anil Sharma
- Vipin Sharma as Home Minister Pradeep Gajra
- Saurabh Shukla as Brijesh Mehra, Shaina's father
- Kamlesh Gill as Sulekha Mehra
- Sanjay Mishra as Senior Inspector Ramavtaar Rathi
- Rajit Kapur as Dr. Jayant Verma
- Rocky Verma as Khalid Asgar
- Sumona Chakravarti as Vidhi Gupta
- Kavin Dave as Jignesh
- Diya Chalwad as Jhumki Chauhan
- Sadiq Abbas Rizvi as Raju
- Shivansh Kotia as Amandeep Singh
- Aniket Sharma as Rohan Bhasin
- Rushikesh Patil as Shantosh Kumar
- Riya Vij as Bubbles
- Nargis Fakhri as herself cameo appearance in song "Yaar Na Miley"
- Rajshri Deshpande as Mrs. Sharma

== Production ==
=== Development ===
Producer Sajid Nadiadwala initially signed A. R. Murugadoss as the director, but he was replaced by Shirish Kunder after Murugadoss was unable to direct the film. Apart from Ileana D'Cruz, who starred in the original 2009 film of the same name, Deepika Padukone, Anushka Sharma, Sonakshi Sinha, Priyanka Chopra, and Angela Jonsson were considered for the female lead. After much discussions, Jacqueline Fernandez was signed on to act in the film. US-based Abhijat Joshi, who had written the scripts for Munna Bhai M.B.B.S. and Lage Raho Munnabhai was approached to write the script in 2009. Nadiadwala wanted the script to be prepared during the release of 3 Idiots, when Joshi had come back to India. Chetan Bhagat eventually wrote the script for the film which is based on Vakkantham Vamsi's script.

=== Principal photography ===
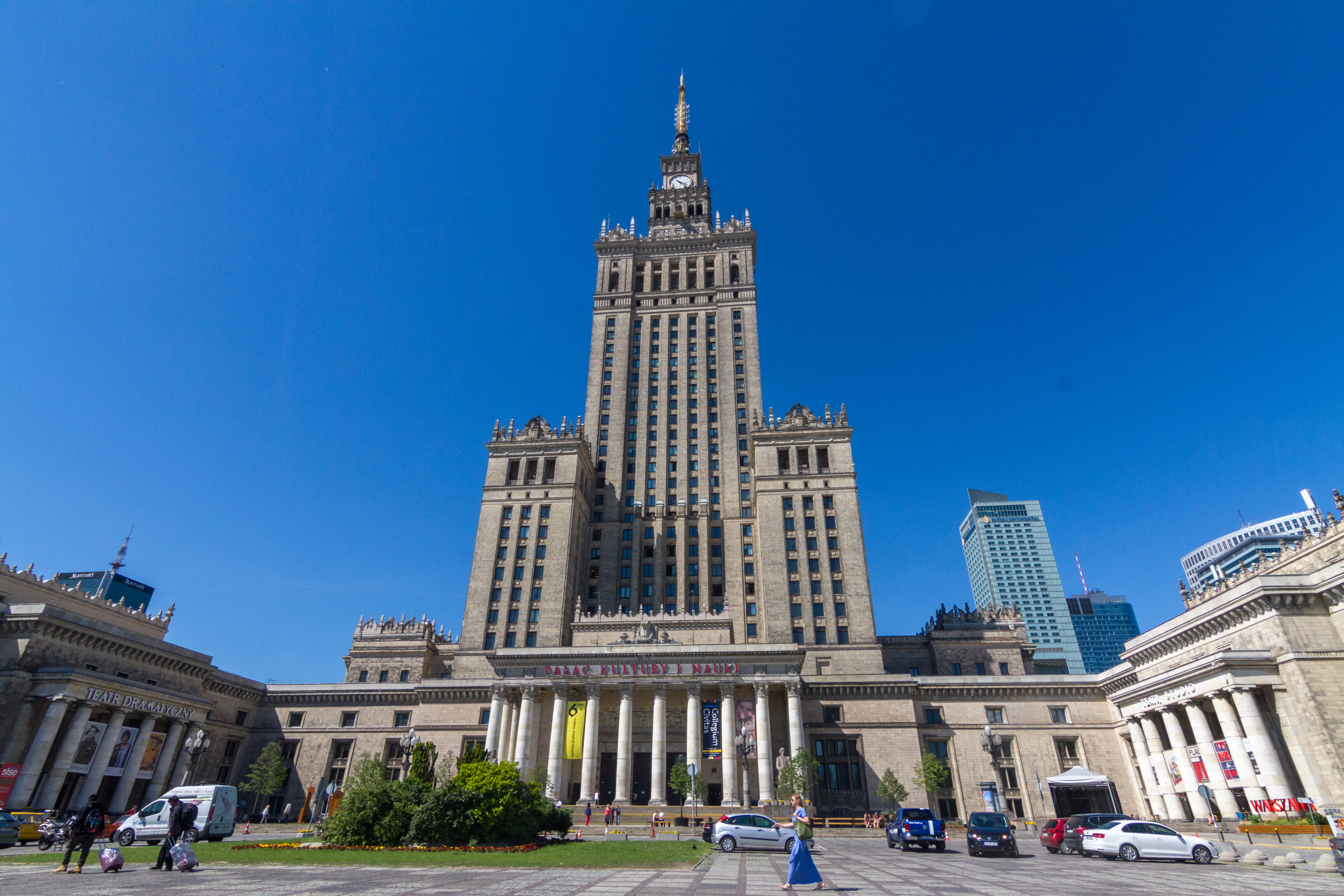
Palace of Culture and Science which was featured in the film.

Nadiadwala and his team visited South Korea in September 2011 at the invitation from the Korea Tourism Organization, and he signed an agreement to shoot portions of this project and others in that country. The shooting of the film began on 27 July 2013 in Scotland, where Khan shot a car crash scene and helicopter crash scene in Glasgow. Some scenes were shot at Mehboob Studios in February 2014 In October 2013, while the shooting was in progress outside the city of Mumbai, the Film Studio Settings and Allied Mazdoor Union asked Sajid to pay them wages for one and a half shifts, which he refused. The workers stopped shooting for a week and only resumed when Sajid agreed to the worker's demands. The shooting of the movie Roy had to be postponed due to Fernandez's commitments to this movie. Fernandez started learning the Urdu language specifically for the film with a coach who was hired by Khan. While shooting was underway in Mumbai in March 2014, Khan's body double, Ajay, was injured while shooting a stunt scene. He was supposed to jump from the first floor of a house onto a railway track, but went through the sugar glass, injuring his face. He required hospitalization.

The film's climax was shot in Poland at the Palace of Culture and Science in Warsaw. Khan wanted to shoot part of the film in United Kingdom, but he was refused a visa by the authorities.

== Music ==
The soundtrack album featuring 18-tracks were composed by Himesh Reshammiya, Meet Bros. Anjjan, and Yo Yo Honey Singh. The film's score was composed by Julius Packiam. The lyrics were written by Kumaar, Shabbir Ahmed, Mayur Puri, Yo Yo Honey Singh, Jasmine Sandlas. The album was released on 7 July 2014. Sajid bought the rights to the song "Saat Samundar Par" from the film Vishwatma (1992). It was a tribute to Sajid's first late wife and Bollywood actress Divya Bharti, on whom the song was picturized on. Since this was his first film he directed, he wanted to pay a tribute to his late wife Divya, and wanted her to be part of it. Salman Khan danced to the song "Saat Samundar Par" as a tribute to Bharti.

== Box office ==
=== India ===
On its opening day, Kick earned around ₹260 million, making it the second highest non-holiday opening grosser behind Dhoom 3. The film had a similar collection on its second day, at around ₹270 million. The collection on Sunday saw a jump as it went to ₹290 million, to take it to a weekend total of ₹820 million. On its first Monday the film went on to make around ₹140 million, and on Tuesday the film showed a big increase due to Eid and collected a record total amounting to approximately ₹260 million. On Wednesday, it earned a further ₹200 million. And on Thursday, the film collected around ₹140 million, taking its opening week total to ₹1.55 billion, the second highest after Dhoom 3.

It grossed around ₹85 million on its eighth day, around ₹100 million on its ninth and ₹130 million on its tenth day, taking the second weekend to ₹315 million, the third highest behind Dhoom 3 and 3 Idiots. The ten-day domestic total was thus ₹1.87 billion. With this, it also became Salman Khan's highest grosser in India, beating Ek Tha Tiger. Kick took its business to ₹2.04 billion in two weeks as it made ₹480 million in its second week. It further grossed ₹90 million in week three and ₹20 million in week four, taking the final domestic gross to ₹2.33 billion and becoming the second highest earner in India after Dhoom 3.

In the Mumbai circuit, the film had a strong opening where it collected ₹310 million from its first four days. whereas it earned about ₹177 million from its first four days in the Delhi/UP region. In the East Punjab, C. P. Berar, Central India, and Rajasthan circuits, the film made ₹262 million in its first four days. In the West Bengal, Bihar, Jharkhand, Assam, and Odisha circuits, the film made a total of about ₹92 million in its first four days, while it made ₹80 million in the South Indian circuit in the same period. The film's final domestic gross in India was ₹309.89 crore (equivalent to ₹540 crore or US$56 million in 2026).

=== Pakistan ===
In Pakistan, not only did it break the Rs11.4 million opening day business of Waar but also eclipsed Dhoom 3's all-time highest opening day collection of Rs19m. Kick earned 20.01 crore from Pakistan. Kick was one of the highest grossing Hindi films at the time, with a final worldwide gross collection of ₹4.02 billion (equivalent to ₹7.0 billion or US$73 million in 2026).

=== Overseas ===
Overseas earnings were ₹24.05 crore (equivalent to ₹42 crore or US$4.4 million in 2026) in the first four days, including US$3 million in its opening weekend. From United States theaters, the film made ₹4.99 crore ($829,411) from 141 screens, while from Canada it fetched ₹1.17 crore (US$194,016) from 22 screens. In its opening weekend in the UAE-GCC region, including Thursday's preview shows, Kick grossed ₹4.09 crore (AED 2,500,000). The film ran on 137 screens in the UK-Ireland region, where it grossed ₹2.44 crore (£239,150). From 25 screens in Australia, it grossed ₹1.48 crore (A$263,095) in the first three days. New Zealand and Malaysia had the lowest opening weekend total. From New Zealand it grossed ₹41.92 lakh (NZ$81,721) and from Malaysia ₹5.98 lakh (MYR 31,588).

At the end of its theatrical run overseas, the film earned $11.38 million (₹68.28 crore) in overseas markets. The highest revenue came from the Gulf ($4.13 million), US/Canada ($2.473 million), UK (£1.314 million), and Australia (Aus $510,000). The film became the highest holiday grosser ever in Pakistan, opening with ₹2.08 crore and beating the record of Dhoom 3. In Pakistan, where the film catered to the ongoing Eid festivities, the film at the conclusion of its second weekend grossed ₹7.4 crore. The film released on 7 November 2014 in Poland and collected ₹8 crore (equivalent to ₹14 crore or US$1.4 million in 2026) there.

== Reception ==
Kick generally received mixed to positive reviews.Taran Adarsh of Bollywood Hungama gave the film 4.5 stars and predicted that it would become a blockbuster. Sarita Tanvar from DNA gave the movie 4 stars and called it "a non-stop entertainment and Salman Khan at his best." Saurabh Dwivedi from India Today also gave the film 4 stars and stated, "This film will rule over everybody's hearts and minds. The film is replete with all things about Salman, and it's a complete paisa vasool watch. It's a masala offering for families, students, kids, and everyone in between." Times of India also gave a positive review and rated it with 3.5 stars. They stated "Kick is Bollywood biryani, a masala movie spiced with the superstardom of Salman Khan, garnished by charming Jacqueline, smouldered over the wry talent of Randeep Hooda. Kick is not for lovers of fine filmi foie gras, but for those who want a hearty Eid banquet to enjoy". Subhash K. Jha gave 4 out of 5 stars and said "Nadiadwala ensures there are enough tailor-made sequences to accentuate Salman's super-heroic persona".

Raja Sen of Rediff gave it 3 out of 5 stars and stated that "Kick is Salman's best film in a decade". Aparna Mudi of Zee News gave it 3 out of 5 stars and stated, "The movie is exactly what it promises – a larger than life Salman Khan movie which the director knows will go down well with his massive fan following".

Rachit Gupta from Filmfare gave the movie 3 out of 5 and called it "a brainless romp". Shubha Shetty Saha from Mid-Day gave the movie 2 out of 5 and called it "a bizarre movie". Anupama Chopra from Hindustan Times gave the movie 2.5 out of 5 and called it "an outrageously silly film". Rajeev Masand from CNN-IBN gave the movie 2.5 out of 5 and said "it doesn't make much sense". Rahul Desai from Mumbai Mirror gave the movie 2 out of 5 and called it "harebrained, patronizing and regressive at most points". Suhani Singh from India Today gave the movie 1.5 out of 5 and called it "unimaginative and unoriginal". Saibal Chatterjee from NDTV gave the movie 2 out of 5 and said "it provides a kick only sporadically". Shubhra Gupta from The Indian Express gave the movie 2 out of 5 and called it "unjhelable".

== Video game ==
An official game based on the film was released by India Games Ltd. on the Google Play Store for Android users.
