= Julius Packiam =

Indian film score composer

Julius Packiam is an Indian film score composer. He has composed the soundtracks for Ek Tha Tiger, Tiger Zinda Hai, Dhoom 3, Baaghi, Baaghi 2, Bajrangi Bhaijaan, Sultan and Bharat.

== Filmography ==
Year	Film	Notes
2006	Kabul Express	
2009	New York	
2009	Dil Bole Hadippa!	
2010	Hum Tum Aur Ghost	
2010	Badmaash Company	
2012	Ek Tha Tiger	
2013	Dhoom 3	
2014	Gunday	
2014	Kick	
2014	Mardaani	
2015	Bajrangi Bhaijaan	
2015	Phantom	
2016	Baaghi	
2016	Sultan	
2017	Tubelight	
2017	Tiger Zinda Hai	
2018	Baaghi 2	
2019	Bharat	
2019	Sye Raa Narasimha Reddy	Telugu film
2019	Housefull 4	
2020	Baaghi 3	
2021	Bunty Aur Babli 2	
2021	83	
2022	Bachchhan Paandey	
2022	Cuttputlli	
2022	Jogi	
2023	Shehzada	
2023	Bloody Daddy	Composer for the song ''Real Talk''
2024	Bade Miyan Chote Miyan	
2025	Housefull 5	Also contributed to composing "Housefull 5 Mixtape" along with Shankar–Ehsaan–Loy, Sajid–Wajid
2026	Ikka	
