= Ahmed Khan (choreographer) =

Indian choreographer and filmmaker (born 1974)

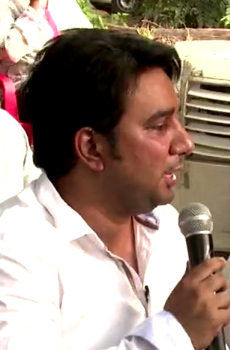
- Born: 3 June 1974 (age 52); Pune, Maharashtra, India
- Occupations: Producer; director; choreographer; writer
- Years active: 1987–present
- Spouse: Shaira Ahmed Khan
- Children: 2

Ahmed Khan (born 3 June 1974) is an Indian choreographer, producer, director, and writer. After a period of acting, he has moved into film choreography, as well as writing, producing, and directing various Bollywood projects. In 2019, Khan also was on the judging panel of the celebrity dance show Nach Baliye 9 on Star Plus.

== Life and career ==
Khan was born in Pune, Maharashtra, on 3 June 1974. He performed as a child actor in Mr. India before pursuing a career as a choreographer.

After Mr. India, Khan choreographed the films Taal, Ghajini, and Kick. During this period, he also directed Lakeer – Forbidden Lines, and worked on the comedy Fool & Final. He wrote and produced Paathshaala and Ek Paheli Leela. His latest directing venture, Baaghi 2, was a success at the box office.

Khan served as judge on Dance India Dance Lil Master during its third season, and was popular among contestants, who referred to him as "Pappi King". In 2019, he served as a judge on the ninth season of the reality competition show Nach Baliye.

== Personal life ==
Ahmed Khan is married to model Shaira Khan, who is a producer with Paperdoll Entertainment. Together, they have produced the films Paathshaala and Ek Paheli Leela. The couple live in Andheri with their two sons.

Ahmed Khan has narrowly escaped death twice. The first time occurred while he was filming at the World Trade Center in New York City only two days before the September 11 attacks. His second brush with death happened in 2004, when he was set to stay at a hotel that was destroyed in the 2004 Indian Ocean tsunami. Khan had cancelled his reservation at the last minute.

== Selected awards ==
- Filmfare Best Choreography Award – Rangeela (1995)
- Telugu Filmfare Award for Best Choreography – Ganesh (2000)
- Kannada Filmfare Award for Best Choreography – Yuva (2005)
- Filmfare Best Choreography Award – Kick (2015)
- IIFA Award – Kick (2015)
- Screen Awards for Best Choreography – Kick (2015)
- AIBA Award for Best Choreography – Kick (2015)
- SICA award – Heropanti (2015)
- Indian Films & Television Choreographers Association Award of Appreciation (2016)
- Star Screen Award for Best Action – Baaghi 2 (2019)
- Zee Cine Award for Best Action – Baaghi 2 (2019)
- Power Brands Jury Award for Best Action – Baaghi 2 (2019)
- Zee Business Award for 100 Crore Club – Baaghi 2 (2019)

== Filmography ==
Film

Year	Film	Director	Producer	Choreographer	Notes
1987	Mr. India	No	No	No	Child actor
1995	Rangeela	No	No	Yes	
1999	Mudhalvan	No	No	Yes	Tamil film; Special appearance in song
2001	Nayak: The Real Hero	No	No	Yes	Special appearance in song
2004	Lakeer	Yes	No	Yes	Also writer
2007	Fool & Final	Yes	No	Yes	
2010	Paathshala	No	Yes	No	Also writer
2014	Heropanti	No	No	Yes	
2014	Kick	No	No	Yes	
2015	Ek Paheli Leela	No	Yes	Yes	
2018	Baaghi 2	Yes	No	Yes	
2020	Baaghi 3	Yes	No	Yes	
2022	Heropanti 2	Yes	No	Yes	
2022	Rashtra Kavach Om	No	Yes	No	
2026	Welcome to the Jungle	Yes	No	No	

Television

Year	Title	Role	Notes
2018	High Fever Dance Ka Naya Tevar	Judge	Dance reality show
2019	Nach Baliye 9	Judge	Dance reality show
