= Sajid Nadiadwala =

Indian film producer (born 1966)

- Sajid Nadiadwala in 2026
- Born: 18 February 1966 (age 60); Mumbai, Maharashtra, India
- Occupations: Film producer Film director Screenwriter
- Years active: 1992–present
- Spouses: Divya Bharti (m. 1992; died 1993) Warda Khan (m. 2000)
- Relatives: Firoz Nadiadwala (cousin)
- Website: sajidnadiadwala.com

Sajid Nadiadwala (born 18 February 1966) is an Indian film producer, film director and screenwriter who works in Hindi cinema. He is the owner of Nadiadwala Grandson Entertainment and the grandson of filmmaker A.K. Nadiadwala. Sajid has produced several films starring Akshay Kumar and Salman Khan. He is known for films such Housefull (2010) and Baaghi (2016) and its sequels. He was the director of Kick that won him a debutant director award. He was also involved in the Marathi film Lai Bhaari that was produced by Riteish Deshmukh. In 2026, he co-produced his first Gujarati film Dhabkaaro, to commemorate the completion of 75 years of Nadiadwala Grandson Entertainment. The film was directed by National Award winning director Abhishek Shah.

== Early life ==
Sajid's grandfather Abdul Karim Nadiadwala came to Mumbai from Nadiad, Gujarat in 1955. His grandfather produced hundreds of films in Mumbai, including Taj Mahal. After completing his undergraduate degree, he worked under J.P. Dutta as an assistant director on the sets of Ghulami at the age of 21.

== Career ==
Sajid started his career as a production assistant in his uncle's production house before establishing his own production company called "Nadiadwala Grandson Entertainment Pvt Ltd" at the age of 25. In 1992, he produced his first film Zulm Ki Hukumat starring Dharmendra and Govinda. He brought together Akshay Kumar and Suniel Shetty for the first time on the big screen with his next, Waqt Hamara Hai (1993).

=== 1996–2006 ===
His next production was Salman Khan – Sunny Deol starrer Jeet in 1996 that went on to become a huge hit and popularised Sunny's hook step in the song "Yaara O Yaara". His next, starring Salman Khan in a double role, Judwaa, created a benchmark in the actor's life and was recognised as a cult film. Har Dil Jo Pyar Karega starring Salman Khan, Rani Mukherjee and Preity Zinta (2000) and Mujhse Shaadi Karogi (2004) starring Akshay Kumar, Priyanka Chopra and Salman Khan were the next films he produced under his banner. His 2006 film Jaan-E-Mann was commercially unsuccessful.

=== 2007–2014 ===
Sajid released Heyy Babyy in 2007, wherein he launched director Sajid Khan (director). His 2009 production Kambakkht Ishq, for the very first time in Bollywood included the casting of Hollywood stars such as Sylvester Stallone, Denise Richards and Brandon Routh. The film starred Akshay Kumar and Kareena Kapoor in the lead. Sajid described the moment when he signed Sylvester Stallone for the film as historic since he was so star-struck by Stallone, as he was wondering whether he should get an autograph first or get the contract signed.

His first film of 2010, Housefull held a stellar cast of Akshay Kumar, Ritesh Deshmukh, Deepika Padukone, Lara Dutta, Jiah Khan, Boman Irani, Arjun Rampal and Randhir Kapoor. The film on release became one of the highest grossers and established Housefull as a successful comedy franchise. On 30 September 2010, he announced a sequel to Housefull that would again star Akshay Kumar in the lead. His next film, a love story, Anjaana Anjaani starring Ranbir Kapoor and Priyanka Chopra released on 1 October 2010 and the music of the film was an overnight success with songs like Tujhe Bhula Diya and Aas Paas Hai Khuda becoming all-time chartbusters.

Housefull 2 was released on 5 April 2012 and this franchise film went on to be a blockbuster by entering the 100- crore – club, commemorating Nadiadwala Grandson's first 100-crore film. In 2014, Sajid Nadiadwala came with four successful films which were among the All-Time Top Grossers in Indian cinema. His first production in the year 2014 was Highway starring Alia Bhatt and Randeep Hooda, directed by Imtiaz Ali was a success at the box office. His decision to green-lit film like Highway brought a lot of appreciation from the industry and audience alike. Next was 2 States, the diverse cultural love story starring Alia Bhatt and Arjun Kapoor in lead roles and directed by Abhishek Varman was yet another 100 crore club that catered to the class as well as mass audience. On 23 May 2014, his first movie starring two debutantes in lead roles Heropanti released. The movie stars Tiger Shroff and Kriti Sanon and has the second-highest opening for a movie starring debutantes. Heropanti became a commercial success and a hit movie, earning over 78 crores Worldwide and over 52.92 crores net domestically in India with an opening of 6.65 crores net domestically in India .

Sajid made his directorial debut with the July 2014 release Kick, a remake of Ravi Teja's 2009 Telugu film Kick. The film stars Salman Khan and Jacqueline Fernandez as the leads. The film broke all previous Khan records and is one of the top 100 highest-grossing Indian films. Sajid with this film also successfully resurrected Jacqueline Fernandez's Bollywood career and got the actress in many movies. The actress said about her Judwaa 2 producer, Sajid Nadiadwala, admitting that it was he who noticed her before anyone else, giving her the special appearance in Housefull song, "Dhanno" and then going on to cast her in Housefull 2 and his directorial debut, Kick. Fernandez said about Sajid "My oldest equation is with him, his wife Warda is my soul sister and I've watched his kids grow in front of my eyes. I'm in the movies because of him and I'll never forget that. I'll always be there for Nadiad and Salman".

=== 2015-2019 ===
In 2015, Sajid produced Kabir Khan's directorial Phantom starring Saif Ali Khan and Katrina Kaif. The national spy action saga was based on Mumbai Avengers on the aftermath of 26/11 Mumbai attacks and was widely appreciated film. The song "Afghan Jalebi" broke records and became the no.1 chartbusters. Next was the highly talked film, Tamasha starring ex flame Ranbir Kapoor and Deepika Padukone, directed by Imtiaz Ali. The film grossed 100 crore worldwide and is received much love and appreciation by the critics. The music album of the film became hit and is considered one of the top albums of the decade with songs like "Matargashti" and "Agar Tum Saath Ho" ruling the charts.

In 2016, Sajid Nadiadwala had another successful year, with three back-to-back hits, Baaghi, Housefull 3 and Dishoom. Baaghi, an action adventure film starring his protégé Tiger Shroff and actress Shraddha Kapoor grossed 129 crore worldwide. The third installment of the Akshay Kumar lead Housefull franchise, Housefull 3, broke box office records and grossed 195 crore worldwide. On announcing the fourth instalment of the Housefull franchise Sajid said “Yes, that's right we intend to bring back the entire cast from the earlier Housefull films. Of course Jia Khan is no longer with us. God bless her soul. But all the rest are on." On discussing the idea behind the film he said "I just thought we’ve seen so many serious intense romantic films on the theme of reincarnation, you know Madhumati, Karz etc...why not a funny take on punar-janam? That was my idea. I shared it with my story writers. I thought they would take at least a year or two to crack it. But they came up with a terrific plot within no time. So yeah, here we are all set to do a rip-roaring take on reincarnation. We are looking ahead at making the most expensive comedy ever to come from our production house". Housefull 4, set across two time zones, was released Diwali 2019.

Rangoon, starring Saif Ali Khan, Kangana Ranaut and Shahid Kapoor, was released on 24 February 2017. Sajid Nadiadwala's reboot version of his cult classic Judwaa, once again directed by David Dhawan titled Judwaa 2 broke the dry spell running at the box office in 2017. The film was a significant commercial success, earning over ₹223 crores worldwide. The film has become Varun Dhawan's highest-grossing film as a lead actor so far. Nadiadwala then released Baaghi 2 starring Tiger Shroff and Disha Patani in 2018. The film earned over ₹258 crores worldwide, becoming a major commercial success. The film is a remake to the Telugu film Kshanam (2016).

== Personal life ==
Sajid Nadiadwala

Sajid married actress Divya Bharti (who converted to Islam and took the name Sana) on 10 May 1992 in a private Nikah ceremony. She died on 5 April 1993 by accidentally falling from the balcony of her 5th floor apartment in Bombay (Mumbai). Ten months after Divya's death, Sajid met Warda Khan, a journalist. Khan proposed to Nadiadwala and on 18 November 2000, the two were married. The couple later had two sons.

== Filmography ==
Key
†	Denotes films that have not yet been released

Year	Film	Producer	Director	Writer	Screenplay
1992	Zulm Ki Hukumat	Yes			
1993	Waqt Hamara Hai	Yes			
1995	Andolan	Yes			
1996	Jeet	Yes			
1997	Judwaa	Yes			
2000	Har Dil Jo Pyar Karega	Yes			
2004	Mujhse Shaadi Karogi	Yes			
2006	Jaan-E-Mann	Yes			
2007	Heyy Babyy	Yes			
2009	Kambakkht Ishq	Yes			
2010	Housefull	Yes		Yes	
2010	Anjaana Anjaani	Yes			
2012	Housefull 2	Yes		Yes	Yes
2014	Highway	Yes			
2014	2 States	Yes			
2014	Heropanti	Yes			
2014	Kick	Yes	Yes		Yes
2014	Lai Bhaari			Yes	
2015	Phantom	Yes			
2015	Tamasha	Yes			
2016	Baaghi	Yes			
2016	Housefull 3	Yes			
2016	Dishoom	Yes			
2017	Rangoon	Yes			
2017	Judwaa 2	Yes			
2018	Baaghi 2	Yes			
2019	Kalank	Yes			
2019	Super 30	Yes			
2019	Chhichhore	Yes			
2019	Housefull 4	Yes			
2020	Baaghi 3	Yes			
2021	Tadap	Yes			
2021	83	Yes			
2022	Bachchhan Paandey	Yes			
2022	Heropanti 2	Yes		Yes	
2023	Satyaprem Ki Katha	Yes			
2023	Bawaal	Yes			
2024	Chandu Champion	Yes			
2024	Yek Number	Yes			
2025	Sikandar	Yes			
2025	Housefull 5	Yes		Yes	Yes
2025	Baaghi 4	Yes		Yes	
2026	O'Romeo	Yes			
2026	Dhabkaaro	Yes			

== Awards and nominations ==
Year	Category	For	Result
2015	Filmfare Best Film Award	2 States	Nominated
2015	IIFA Award for Debut Director	Kick	Won
2020	Filmfare Best Film Award	Chhichhore	Nominated
2020	National Film Award for Best Feature Film in Hindi	Chhichhore	Won
