= Ramesh Karad =

Indian politician from Maharashtra

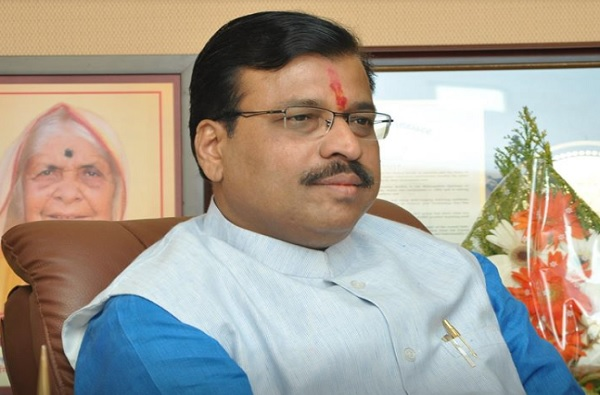

Member of the Maharashtra Legislative Assembly
- Incumbent
- Assumed office 2024
- Preceded by: Dhiraj Deshmukh
- Constituency: Latur Rural

Member of the Maharashtra Legislative Council
- In office 14 May 2020 – 23 November 2024
- Succeeded by: Sanjay Kenekar
- Constituency: Elected by MLAs

Personal details
- Born: Rameshwar, Latur, Maharashtra, India
- Party: Bhartiya Janata Party
- Other political affiliations: Nationalist Congress Party
- Relations: Vishwanath Karad (paternal uncle)
- Parent: Kashiram Karad (father)
- Education: Bachelor of Commerce; Bachelor of Education
- Alma mater: Pune college Dr. Babasaheb Ambedkar Marathwada University
- Occupation: Politician

Ramesh Kashiram Karad (/rɑːmɛʃ kɑːrəd/; Marathi: [rəmeʂ kərad]), commonly known as Ramesh Appa Karad, is an Indian politician from Maharashtra state and a member of Maharashtra Legislative Council from Bharatiya Janata Party and district president of Bharatiya Janata Party Latur.

He belongs to Latur district of Marathwada region in Maharashtra. He became councilor in 2020.

Ramesh Karad got elected to the Legislative Council by MLA's (unopposed) on 14 May 2020.

== Personal life ==
Karad was born in a Hindu family to Kashiram Dadarao Karad in Rameshvar village of Latur Taluka in Latur district of Maharashtra. He's politician by profession. His wife has a milk business. He is follower of saint Bhagwan Baba of Savargaon. He's nephew of education baron Vishwanath Karad. He's commonly referred to as Appa by his followers.

== Political career ==
Karad fought elections from his native Latur rural (Vidhan Sabha constituency), which was part of Renapur Assembly constituency. Renapur was influenced by then BJP leader Gopinath Munde. Karad is a follower of Munde. Latur rural constituency was created in 2009 by division of Renapur and Latur constituencies. Karad kept the party alive in Latur rural after the death of Munde. It was not easy to face then chief minister late Vilasrao Deshmukh directly.

But Karad fought alone in Latur rural. Karad is dreaming to be a legislator since 2009 due to Karad family's legacy and organization in rural region. He fought 2009 Maharashtra Legislative Assembly election, in which Vaijnath Shinde of Indian National Congress defeated Karad by 23,500 votes. Trimbak Bhise of INC defeated Karad in 2014 Maharashtra Legislative Assembly election by 10,500 votes. But Karad didn't leave hope after two consecutive defeats.

He continuously remained in contact with his voters. In 2018 legislative council election, he filed a nomination from Nationalist Congress Party against Suresh Dhas of BJP. But he shocked NCP leader Dhananjay Munde, by drawing back nomination and returning to Pankaja Munde's group. Environment was set in 2019 Maharashtra Legislative Assembly election. He started works as per the orders of the party. Karad's followers had been claiming openly that, BJP left the seat to Shiv Sena to ease the victory of congress leader Dhiraj Deshmukh.

Since then Karad didn't appear in the election. But the party attempted to remove his upset by giving him designation of district president for Latur rural . He filed nomination papers for legislative council election along with three other BJP members in 2020. But BJP used shock mechanism by giving official candidature to Karad instead of previously announced Ajit Gopchhade. He won the council election unopposed and entered legislature for the first time. He resigned from his membership of legislative council in December 2024 upon getting elected to legislative assembly defeating Dhiraj Deshmukh.

== Scams and controversies ==
Karad is involved in three criminal cases where six charges are framed which include charges related to:

1. Intimidation (IPC Section-506)
2. Voluntarily causing hurt by dangerous weapons or means (IPC Section-324)
3. Intentional insult with intent to provoke breach of the peace (IPC Section-504)
4. Punishment for Rioting (IPC Section-147)
5. Rioting, armed with deadly weapon (IPC Section-148)
6. Every member of unlawful assembly guilty of offence committed in prosecution of common object (IPC Section-149)

In 2020, FIR was filed against him and his 22 followers by district collector and magistrate of Beed district, because he didn't follow social distancing in COVID-19 pandemic.

== Positions held ==
Within the party

• 2020–present: district president, Latur rural

In the legislature

• 2020–present: member, Maharashtra legislative council

== See also ==
• Latur Rural (Vidhan Sabha constituency)
