= Mere Husband Ki Biwi =

2025 Indian film by Mudassar Aziz

- Theatrical release poster
- Directed by: Mudassar Aziz
- Written by: Mudassar Aziz
- Produced by: Vashu Bhagnani; Jackky Bhagnani; Deepshikha Deshmukh
- Starring: Arjun Kapoor; Bhumi Pednekar; Rakul Preet Singh; Shakti Kapoor
- Cinematography: Manoj Kumar Khatoi
- Edited by: Ninad Khanolkar
- Music by: Score: John Stewart Eduri; Songs: Vishal Mishra; Tanishk Bagchi; Badshah; Akshay - IP Singh; Sohail Sen
- Production company: Pooja Entertainment
- Distributed by: PVR Inox Pictures
- Release date: 21 February 2025
- Running time: 142 minutes
- Country: India
- Language: Hindi
- Box office: est. ₹12.73 crore

Mere Husband Ki Biwi (transl. My husband's wife), is a 2025 Indian Hindi-language romantic comedy film written and directed by Mudassar Aziz and produced by Vashu Bhagnani, Jackky Bhagnani and Deepshikha Deshmukh under their banner Pooja Entertainment. The film stars Arjun Kapoor, Bhumi Pednekar and Rakul Preet Singh in lead roles. The film was released on 21 February 2025 and emerged as a commercial failure. It gained negative reviews from the audiences.

== Plot ==
Ankur Chadda (Arjun Kapoor) is in real estate business with his father (Shakti Kapoor) and is still having nightmares 5 years after his divorce with his college love Prabhleen Kaur Dhillon (Bhumi Pednekar). As a result, he is unable to sustain any relationship. He goes to Rishikesh to finalize a real estate deal where he meets Antara Khanna (Rakul Preet Singh), whom he knows from college. Upon advice of his best friend Rehan Qureshi (Harsh Gujral) he pursues a relationship with Antara and both hit it off.

Ankur opens up with Antara about his disastrous marriage with Prabhleen whom he met in college and married later on. However, her commitment towards her career as journalist and Ankur's flamboyant attitude did not mingle well. Prabhleen did not like Ankur's family, hence they moved to their own house but their schedule did not match causing frequent fights. Ankur made Prabhleen quit her job by creating a scene at her office forcing her to abort her pregnancy. Ankur divorces her. Antara distances herself from Ankur as she feels he is too broken to love again.

One day Ankur gets news that Prabhleen had an accident. He rushes to hospital to find out that she has lost memories of past five years and does not remember the turmoil their marriage was. She is told about their failed marriage but she is still in love with Ankur. But when she realizes Ankur has in fact proposed Antara, it is then she decides to win Ankur back. Flashback shows both Prabhleen and Antara being arch rivals in college who didn't like each other. Prabhleen meets with Antara and both decide to fight for Ankur but without his knowledge. Antara throws an anniversary party for Ankur's parents where she accepts his marriage proposal and invites Prabhleen and his family to Scotland to attend her marriage.

In Scotland, Prabhleen pretends to be suicidal to get sometime alone with Ankur. She also manipulates Antara's parents for a prenuptial clause to make sure their daughter gets her fair share in case of divorce as she didn't get anything when Ankur divorced her. However, she has a breakdown before the wedding. Feeling guilty Antara confesses to Ankur about her challenge with Prabhleen. Ankur feels both women treated him like a trophy and calls off the wedding with Antara's whom he thought was sensible and not impulsive like Prabhleen.

Prabhleen, realizing her mistake and that Ankur actually loves Antara, helps them reconcile and as promised dances at their wedding.

== Cast ==
- Arjun Kapoor as Ankur Chaddha
- Bhumi Pednekar as Prabhleen Kaur Dhillon
- Rakul Preet Singh as Antara Khanna
- Harsh Gujral as Rehan Qureshi
- Dino Morea as Ricky Khanna
- Aditya Seal as Rajveer Singh
- Shakti Kapoor as Shekhar, Ankur's father
- Kavita Kapoor as Manisha, Ankur's mother
- Mukesh Rishi as Harshad, Prabhleen's father
- Kanwaljit Singh as Deepak, Antara's father
- Anita Raj as Geeta, Antara's mother
- Tiku Talsania as Arun Mathur
- Alka Kaushal as Nisha, Prabhleen's mother
- Navaldeep Singh as Kuki
- Daman Singh as Young Kuki
- Supreet Bedi as Natasha Taylor
- Neelam Daswani as Sushma

== Production ==
=== Development ===
The film was initially titled Meri Patni Ka Remake, which was later changed to Mere Husband Ki Biwi.

=== Filming ===
Principal photography commenced on 12 September 2022 in London.

== Music ==
Mere Husband Ki Biwi

Soundtrack album by Vishal Mishra, Tanishk Bagchi, Badshah, Akshay - IP Singh and Sohail Sen
- Released: 17 February 2025
- Recorded: 2022–2023
- Genre: Feature film soundtrack
- Length: 16:09
- Language: Hindi
- Label: Jjust Music

Official audio
- Mere Husband Ki Biwi Full Album on YouTube

The film's soundtrack was composed by Vishal Mishra, Tanishk Bagchi, Badshah, Akshay - IP Singh and Sohail Sen while the background score is composed by John Stewart Eduri. The song "Gori Hai Kalaiyan," from the 1990 film Aaj Ka Arjun, sung by Lata Mangeshkar and Shabbir Kumar is recreated for the film. The second single titled "Ikk Vaari" was released on 13 February 2025.

Track listing
No.	Title	Lyrics	Music	Singer(s)	Length
1.	"Gori Hai Kalaiyan"	IP Singh	Akshay - IP Singh	Kanika Kapoor, Badshah, IP Singh, Sharvi Yadav, Lata Mangeshkar (Partially)	2:16
2.	"Ikk Vaari"	Mudassar Aziz	Tanishk Bagchi	Romy	2:54
3.	"Rabba Mereya"	Mudassar Aziz	Vishal Mishra	Vishal Mishra	3:15
4.	"Sawariya Ji"	Mudassar Aziz	Sohail Sen	Sohail Sen, Varsha Singh Dhanoa	2:30
5.	"Channa Tu Bemisal"	Mudassar Aziz	Tanishk Bagchi	Jubin Nautiyal, Bhoomi Trivedi	5:14
Total length:					16:09

== Release ==
=== Theatrical ===
Mere Husband Ki Biwi was theatrically released on 21 February 2025.

=== Home media ===
The film's digital streaming rights were acquired by Disney+ Hotstar.

== Reception ==
=== Critical response ===
On the review aggregator website Rotten Tomatoes, 27% of 11 critics' reviews are positive, with an average rating of 4.7/10.

Saibal Chatterjee of NDTV rated 1.5/5 stars and said that "Mere Husband Ki Biwi, a stoop and stumble affair, sets the bar conveniently low but, strangely, struggles to top even that. It isn't a victim of its ambition, but of the singular lack of it." Shubhra Gupta of The Indian Express also gave 1.5 stars and observed that "This is the kind of film that tells you why Bollywood is where it is. You take your stars Arjun Kapoor, Bhumi Pednekar and Rakul Preet Singh and then stuff the film with a supporting cast that works as a buffering collection of one-liners." Bollywood Hungama noted "MERE HUSBAND KI BIWI is built on an interesting premise and is elevated by strong performances from its lead actors. While the storytelling could have been more compelling, the film still offers moments of entertainment. At the box office, positive word of mouth can help it carve its space despite competition from CHHAAVA." Rating: 3/5 stars

Rahul Desai of The Hollywood Reporter India commented about it that "Mere Husband Ki Biwi could have been better—if everything about it were better. In an industry flooded with biopics and remakes, even a flawed rom-com feels like a relief. It’s harmless and semi-functional, and in today’s times, that’s enough."

India Today noted "Mere Husband Ki Biwi is a generic Hindi film that checks all the boxes but doesn't necessarily impress...Arjun Kapoor, Bhumi Pednekar, and Rakul Preet Singh are all good but they can't rise above the material." Rating: 2.5/5 stars

Devesh Sharma of Filmfare commented "Mere Husband Ki Biwi is a chaotic love triangle served with an extra helping of melodrama. Be warned of sex jokes and potty humour," Rating: 3/5 stars Anuj Kumar of The Hindu commented that "Director Mudassar Aziz takes a long time to find his groove in this unremarkable triatomic fission" Rishabh Suri of Hindustan Times gave 2.5 stars and said that in his review that "Overall, Mere Husband Ki Biwi had the potential to be hilarious. It tries hard, and credit to the makers for the attempt. But it falls short." Ganesh Aaglave of Firstpost observed that "Mere Husband Ki Biwi is not flawless but what makes it worth watching is its relevance and believability of the storytelling" Deepa Gahlot of scroll.in said about the film that "It is neither funny nor dramatic enough." Pratikshya Mishra of The Quint gave 2.5 stars and said that "I often find myself asking a very basic question once a film’s end credits roll: “Is this a bad film?” It helps remove the film from all the hype surrounding it and the otherwise unnecessary context and look at it in its barebones form. In that sense, Mere Husband Ki Biwi isn't bad. It's just a wasted opportunity. Mere Husband Ki Biwi upsets not because of the film it is but because of the film it could have been."
