= Cuttputlli =

2022 Indian film by Ranjit M. Tewari

- Official release poster
- Directed by: Ranjit M. Tewari
- Written by: Aseem Arora
- Screenplay by: Tushar Trivedi
- Story by: Ram Kumar
- Based on: Ratsasan by Ram Kumar
- Produced by: Vashu Bhagnani; Jackky Bhagnani; Deepshikha Deshmukh
- Starring: Akshay Kumar; Rakul Preet Singh; Sargun Mehta
- Cinematography: Rajeev Ravi
- Edited by: Chandan Arora
- Music by: Score: Julius Packiam; Songs: Tanishk Bagchi; Dr. Zeus; Aditya Dev
- Production company: Pooja Entertainment
- Distributed by: Disney+ Hotstar
- Release date: 2 September 2022
- Running time: 134 minutes
- Country: India
- Language: Hindi
- Budget: ₹150 crore

Cuttputlli (transl. Puppet) is a 2022 Indian Hindi-language psychological crime thriller film directed by Ranjit M. Tewari and produced by Vashu Bhagnani, Jackky Bhagnani, and Deepshikha Deshmukh under Pooja Entertainment. A remake of the 2018 Tamil film Ratsasan written and directed by Ram Kumar, it stars Akshay Kumar in the lead role with Rakul Preet Singh, Joshua LeClair, Chandrachur Singh, and Sargun Mehta in supporting roles.

The film premiered on Disney+ Hotstar on 2 September 2022 and received mixed reviews from critics.

== Plot ==
The corpse of 15-year-old student Samiksha, who was brutally murdered, is discovered. Arjan Sethi is an aspiring filmmaker who wants to make a film on psychopaths. After multiple rejections from film producers and pressure from his family, he becomes an SI in the Himachal Pradesh Police, with the help of his brother-in-law Narinder Singh, a police officer himself. While Arjan does have a significant rank, he is treated like a rookie, due to a lack of police experience. He moves in with his sister Seema, Narinder, and their daughter Payal. Payal gets into trouble in school and asks Arjan for help, so he meets her teacher Divya at school, posing as Payal's father, though soon exposed. He also befriends Divya's hearing and speech-impaired niece, Iti.

Meanwhile, Arjan investigates the abduction of a schoolgirl, Amrita. He finds similarities between Samiksha and Amrita's case, due to the mutilations on a doll found at Amrita's house. But his attempts to convince his superior officer, SHO Gudiya Parmar, go futile. A few days later, Amrita's mutilated corpse is found. The coroner suggests that the perpetrator's modus operandi is the same as Samiksha's. Over the next few days, another hearing-impaired girl named Komal from Divya's school is abducted and killed. The search leads to Purushottam Tomar, a teacher at the new school Payal is enrolled in. Tomar is a pedophile who forces girls into irrumatio. Payal herself narrowly escapes Tomar when Arjan nabs him after getting a tip-off from another victim. While trying to get a confession from him on the spot, Arjan discharges his service firearm. Tomar admits to being a sexual predator but denies the murder charges. In a bid to escape, he holds Parmar at gunpoint, but Arjan guns down Tomar.

The same day, Payal is abducted from her birthday party at home and Arjan finds her corpse in their car trunk two days later. To make things worse, Arjan is suspended for his negligence in using his gun when arresting Tomar. Dejected and angry, Arjan unofficially investigates the case himself with the help of a few policemen, including Head Constable Mahinder Guleria. Finding an audio clip from Komal's hearing aid, he traces a piano tune back to a lady magician/pianist Agnes, who performed at all the victims' schools. Arjan informs his findings to SHO Parmar who believes him and reappoints him on the case. Arjan finds that Agnes picks her victims by randomly calling them onto the stage, then kills them within the next few days and her next target would be a girl named Aisha. He tries to warn Aisha but despite constant surveillance, she is abducted. Arjan and his team track her location and save Aisha from being murdered. Agnes escapes and goes to Divya's house, where she attacks Divya and kidnaps Iti.

Arjan tracks Agnes to a nearby abandoned building and discovers that Agnes is a man. The man reveals himself to be Christopher, the son of Agnes, who was arrested many years ago after killing a young beautiful girl similar to the other victims. Christopher reveals that he has progeria, and was bullied when he was younger. A young girl, Sofia, became friends with him when he was younger, but when he confessed his love to her, she humiliated him. Agnes invited Sofia to her home sometime later, where Agnes helped Christopher kill her. Agnes took the blame for the murder, but after she died, Christopher decided to dress up as her and continue killing other girls, as they reminded him of Sofia.

Arjan and Christopher fight, but thanks to Iti, Arjan is able to take him down. Divya comes to aid Arjan, as he and Iti walk away from Christopher's body.

== Cast ==
- Akshay Kumar as SI Arjan Sethi
- Rakul Preet Singh as Divya Bakshi
- Joshua LeClair as Christopher Fernandez / Agnes
- Chandrachur Singh as Narinder Singh
- Sargun Mehta as SHO Gudia Parmar
- Sujith Shankar as Purushottam Tomar
- Gurpreet Ghuggi as Head Constable Mahinder Guleria
- Shahid Latief as SI Ravichand Machchan
- Hrishita Bhatt as Seema Sethi Singh
- Renaye Tejani as Payal Singh
- Suhani Dhanki as RJ Roshini Beniwal
- Suhani Sethi as Sofia

== Production ==
In October 2018, Vishnu Vishal, the lead actor of Ratsasan confirmed that he acquired the Hindi remake rights of the film. In July 2021, Akshay Kumar and Rakul Preet Singh were confirmed to star in the remake which was then titled Mission Cindrella.

The film began its first schedule on 21 August 2021 in the UK which ended in October 2021. Principal photography resumed in February 2022 at Mussoorie, and the entire film wrapped up in Dehradun on 17 February 2022.

== Soundtrack ==
Cuttputlli

Soundtrack album by Tanishk Bagchi, Dr Zeus and Aditya Dev
- Released: 30 August 2022
- Recorded: 2022
- Genre: Feature film soundtrack
- Length: 14:00
- Language: Hindi
- Label: Zee Music Company

Official audio
- Cuttputlli - Full Album on YouTube

The music of the film is composed by Tanishk Bagchi, Dr Zeus and Aditya Dev. The background score is composed by Julius Packiam. The first single titled "Saathiya" was released on 24 August 2022. The second single titled "Rabba" was released on 30 August 2022.

No.	Title	Lyrics	Music	Singer(s)	Length
1.	"Saathiya"	Tanishk Bagchi	Tanishk Bagchi	Nikhil D'Souza, Zahrah Khan	3:32
2.	"Rabba"	Omar Malik	Dr Zeus	Sukhwinder Singh	3:14
3.	"Tu Dis De"	Hamid Ali Naqeebi	Dr Zeus	Hamid Ali Naqeebi	3:54
4.	"Laapata"	Rashmi Virag	Aditya Dev	Payal Dev, Dev Negi	3:20
Total length:					14:00

== Release ==
The film was originally titled as Mission Cindrella before being changed to Cuttputtli on 19 August 2022. The film was premiered on Disney+ Hotstar on 2 September 2022.

The film was sold for home media release for a sum of ₹ 135 Crore.

== Reception ==
The film received mixed reviews when comparing the original to the remake. A critic for DNA India rated the film 4 out of 5 stars and wrote "The film offers everything, ranging from action, drama, tear-jerker moments and a whole lot more". Ronak Kotecha of The Times of India rated the film 3.5 out of 5 stars and wrote "With its cold and damp setting in a nondescript hill town, Cuttputlli gets the eerie atmospherics of a campy whodunit quite right". Devesh Sharma of Filmfare rated the film 3.5 out if 5 stars and wrote "Cuttputlli is an engaging thriller and all we can say is that perhaps they should have gambled". Rohit Bhatnagar of The Free Press Journal rated the film 3 out of 5 stars and wrote "To come out of the bad hangover of recent Akshay Kumar films, Cuttputlli is a perfect binge-watch". Zinia Bandyopadhyay of News 18 rated the film 2.5 out of 5 stars and wrote "Cuttputlli would manage to hook you but there are quite a few distractions too, but overall the film does manage to maintain its pace". Sukanya Verma of Rediff rated the film 2 out of 5 stars and wrote "Cuttputlli's absolutely absurd climax will have you rolling on the floor in unintended laughter". Shubhra Gupta of The Indian Express rated the film 1 out of 5 stars and wrote "Nothing about this thriller, which lacks thrills, works the way it should. Instead of tension, we get a mix of tired family drama-and-romance in this Akshay Kumar film".
