= Seema Tapakai =

2011 film by G.Nageswara Reddy

- Movie Poster
- Directed by: G.Nageswara Reddy
- Story by: G. Nageswara Reddy
- Starring: Allari Naresh; Shamna Kasim; Sayaji Shinde; Jaya Prakash Reddy
- Cinematography: Adusumilli Vijay Kumar
- Edited by: Kotagiri Venkateswara Rao
- Music by: Vandemataram Srinivas
- Production company: Wellfare Creations
- Distributed by: Dil Raju
- Release date: 12 May 2011
- Running time: 128 min
- Country: India
- Language: Telugu
- Box office: ₹7 crore distributors' share

Seema Tapakai (transl. Seema firecrackers) is a 2011 Indian Telugu-language comedy film written and directed by G.Nageswara Reddy, produced by Dr. Vijaya Prasad Malla under Wellfare Creations banner and starring Allari Naresh and Shamna Kasim. The soundtrack was composed by Vandemataram Srinivas and cinematography was handled by Adusumilli Vijay Kumar. The dialogue of the movie was written by popular writer Marudhuri Raja. The screenplay was handled also by G Nageswara Reddy. The film was released on 12 May 2011.

Seema Tapakai was a commercial success at the box office.

== Plot ==
Sri Krishna (Allari Naresh) is the son of a big businessman and multimillionaire, GK (Sayaji Shinde). His father is so rich that he hates even the smell of the poor, and despises anyone who talks about giving money as alms. Sri Krishna's family, too, doesn't mind the opulence they have. Coming from this family, he falls in love with Satya (Shamna Kasim), who thinks the rich become richer by exploiting the poor. In order to make Satya fall for him, Krishna starts acting as a poor chap, with a poor family. He buys his way out to show Satya that he helps the poor, and unintentionally becomes their savior of sorts. When Satya accepts his love, he recruits his family to help him convince her completely. So the rich father becomes a banana seller, rich mother becomes a bajji seller, etc. However, it turns out that Satya is the daughter of Nagineedu (Nagineedu) a factionist from Kurnool who has a rivalry with another faction leader Venkatappa (Jaya Prakash Reddy). She urges her father to share his riches with his followers, an idea which his father doesn't take. But on knowing that she wants to marry a poor boy, he doesn't mind it. In order to get them married Krishna asks her father to act as a Head Master. Both families in their disguises respectively meet and arrange the marriage of Krishna and Satya. Faction leader Venkatappa attacks the family of GK to kill Nagineedu. Knowing the truth about Nagineedu, GK is angered and cancels the marriage. Krishna uses his brain to try to help resolve issues between Venkatappa and Nagineedu and also convinces his father GK for the marriage. In the end, the two factionists understand the value of life and they stop fighting. Both GK and Nagineedu once again agree upon Krishna's marriage.

== Cast ==
- Allari Naresh as Sri Krishna
- Shamna Kasim as Satya (credited as Poorna)
- Sayaji Shinde as Gurajada Krishnamurthy alias GK, Krishna's father
- Sudha as Rajyalakshmi, Krishna's mother GK's wife
- L.B. Sriram as Aravind Swamy, GK's driver
- Brahmanandam as Melimbangaram
- Krishna Bhagavan as Sanyasi Rao, GK's friend
- M. S. Narayana as Narayana, GK's PA
- Nagineedu as Nagineedu, Satya's father
- Jaya Prakash Reddy as Venkatappa
- Rao Ramesh as Narsimha
- Vennela Kishore as Kishore
- Ravi Prakash as Manoj Krishna, GK's son
- Meena as Manoj's wife
- Tirupathi Prakash as Servant
- Surekha Vani as GK's daughter
- Geetha Singh as Maid
- Jeeva as Police officer
- Prabhakar as Venkatappa's son
- Uttej as Person in slum

== Production ==
This movie was produced by Dr. Vijaya Prasad Malla, who was also an MLA in Andhra Pradesh legislative assembly. The director of this movie G Nageswara Reddy had previously worked with Allari Naresh in the movie Seema Sastri as director. He collaborated for the second time with Allari Naresh for this movie. Both Naresh and Nageswara Reddy are known for their comedy in movies. As expected this movie was a comedy entertainer. The movie was delayed due to the Telugu movie strike of 2011. This was Allari Naresh's second release in the year after Aha Na Pellanta. Shamna Kasim who acted in several Tamil and Malayalam movies in the past was cast for the role of Satya, daughter of a factionist. This is Shamna Kasim's first Telugu movie. Being a comedy movie, it features most of the Telugu comedians like L.B. Sriram, Brahmanandam, M. S. Narayana, Sayaji Shinde, Rao ramesh, Jaya Prakash Reddy, Jeeva, Uttej, Vennela Kishore and Geeta Singh. Dialogue Writer Marudhuri raja assisted Nageswara Reddy with the dialogues in the movie. Shooting of the movie began in 2010 and was completed in April 2011 and the movie was released in May 2011. Shooting was predominantly done in Hyderabad.

== Soundtrack ==
Seema Tapakai

Soundtrack album by Vandemataram Srinivas
- Released: 18 April 2011
- Genre: Film soundtrack
- Label: Madhura Audio
- Producer: Vandemataram Srinivas

Audio release of the film was held on 18 April 2011 in Hyderabad. The audio was released and distributed by Madhura Audio. The music of this movie was composed by Vandemataram Srinivas. The audio was well received. Bheems penned two songs in the movie while Bhaskarabhatla Ravikumar and Chilakarekka Ganesh penned one song each. The song "Akasamlo Oka Tara" in the movie Simhasanam, written by veteran poet Veturi and music by Bappi Lahiri was remixed by Vandemataram Srinivas for this movie. The song was sung by Javed Ali and Sravana Bhargavi.

No.	Title	Lyrics	Artist(s)	Length
1.	"Dheere Dheere Dille"	Bheems	Karunya, Geetha Madhuri	4:25
2.	"Akasamlo Okatara"	Veturi	Javed Ali, Sravana Bhargavi	4:40
3.	"I Love U Baby"	Bhaskarabhatla Ravikumar	Viswa, Sravana Bhargavi	4:15
4.	"Dheere Dheere Dille"	Bheems	N. C. Karunya, Geetha Madhuri	4:25
5.	"Kandi Chenu"	Chilakarekka Ganesh	Hemachandra, Usha, Noyal	4:01

== Release and reception ==
The movie was released in India and Overseas on 13 May 2011. The movie was received with positive reviews. Suresh Kavirayani of Times of India gave a good 3 of 5 rating for the movie and said the movie was fun to watch with whole family. Esskay from 123 Telugu gave a 3.5 of 5 rating for the movie and commented that the movie was the best entertainer of the season. Sunita Chowdary from Cinegoer gave a very positive review of the movie and said that it was a fun film for all that summer. The movie fared very well at the box office and was declared a hit in the year 2011.

== Remake ==
The film was remade into Hindi as Ajab Gazabb Love. Directed by Sanjay Gadhvi, the film stars Jackky Bhagnani and Nidhi Subbaiah in lead roles.
