= Bade Miyan Chote Miyan (2024 film) =

2024 Indian film by Ali Abbas Zafar

- Theatrical release poster
- Directed by: Ali Abbas Zafar
- Screenplay by: Ali Abbas Zafar; Aditya Basu
- Dialogues by: Suraj Gianani
- Story by: Ali Abbas Zafar
- Produced by: Jackky Bhagnani; Vashu Bhagnani; Deepshikha Deshmukh; Ali Abbas Zafar; Himanshu Kishan Mehra
- Starring: Akshay Kumar; Tiger Shroff; Prithviraj Sukumaran; Manushi Chhillar; Alaya F; Sonakshi Sinha; Ronit Roy
- Narrated by: Ali Abbas Zafar
- Cinematography: Marcin Laskawiec
- Edited by: Steven H. Bernard
- Music by: Score: Julius Packiam; Songs: Vishal Mishra
- Production companies: Pooja Entertainment; AAZ Films
- Distributed by: PVR Inox Pictures (India); Yash Raj Films (International)
- Release date: 11 April 2024
- Running time: 164 minutes
- Country: India
- Language: Hindi
- Budget: ₹350 crore
- Box office: est. ₹102.16 crore

Bade Miyan Chote Miyan (transl. Big Mister and Little Mister) is a 2024 Indian Hindi-language science fiction action film directed by Ali Abbas Zafar and produced by Pooja Entertainment and AAZ Films. Sharing its name with the 1998 film also produced by Pooja Entertainment, the film stars Akshay Kumar, Tiger Shroff and Prithviraj Sukumaran in the lead roles alongside Manushi Chhillar, Alaya F, Sonakshi Sinha and Ronit Roy. The story follows two former soldiers in a race against time to save India from an imminent attack by a vengeful scientist.

Principal photography began in January 2023 and ended by February 2024 with filming held in Mumbai, Scotland, London, Luton, Abu Dhabi, and Jordan. The soundtrack and musical score were respectively composed by Vishal Mishra and Julius Packiam, while the cinematography and editing were handled by Marcin Laskawiec and Steven H. Bernard respectively. With a budget of ₹350 crore (US$36 million), it is one of the most expensive Indian films ever made.

Bade Miyan Chote Miyan was theatrically released on 11 April 2024, coinciding with Eid al-Fitr, and received generally negative reviews from critics. It emerged as a box-office bomb.

== Plot ==
A masked perpetrator attacks an Indian convoy, containing a weapon, and tells the Indian Army that they will have to race-against-time to prevent the destruction of India. Captain Misha faces off against a masked attacker in Shanghai, where she impales him, but the attacker's wounds inexplicably heal instantly and he escapes. Misha reports the incident to Col. Azad, who instructs her to enlist court-martialed soldiers Firoz "Freddy" and Rakesh "Rocky" for the mission. Only Rocky agrees to help.

Misha and Rocky arrive in London and meet Parminder Pam, an IT specialist assigned to assist them. In London, Azad gets shot by the masked perpetrator. The team infiltrates the London tube to retrieve the stolen package. Freddy arrives to help them fight the masked men. Pam unlocks the vault, revealing that the package is actually Captain Priya Dixit, Freddy's ex-girlfriend. Since the hard drives were at risk of being hacked, the codes to Karan Kavach, a highly advanced defence system, were encrypted inside Priya's brain. The masked perpetrator and his army take Priya hostage and the perpetrator reveals himself as Kabir, a scientist and Freddy and Rocky's former friend.

In the past, Kabir intends to help the Indian Army with his latest invention: a cloning program where clones based on Freddy and Rocky's DNA could be programmed with orders and win wars without being killed. When Kabir reveals his intentions to conquer the world using this invention, Azad orders him to shut it down since it would be unethical. Kabir switches sides and sells the invention to India's enemies. Priya reveals this information to Azad, where Freddy and Rocky are given orders to capture Kabir alive, but they end up killing Kabir and are court-martialed for not following orders, after which Freddy breaks up with Priya without giving her any reason.

In the present, Kabir reveals that he survived because the person who died at the hands of Rocky and Freddy, was actually his clone Eklavya. Eklavya's death left him vengeful as he loved the clone like a son. The masked men were actually Freddy and Rocky's clones. Kabir reveals that he has also cloned Azad and killed the real one.

Kabir kidnaps Priya and leaves Freddy and Rocky to die, but they kill Kabir's henchmen and reveal to the team that Kabir plans to turn Pakistan and China against India by deactivating the Karan Kavach and launching airstrikes against the two countries, which would cause India's reputation to be globally tarnished.

Freddy, Rocky, Misha and Pam infiltrate Kabir's base, where Kabir decrypts the password from Priya's brain. Freddy and Rocky eventually face off against their own clones, who keep rejuvenating due to an internal power source. The duo kills the clones by luring them into a power grid, causing them to explode. Kabir launches the airstrikes before Freddy and Rocky kill him. Priya reveals that Eklavya is the password. The Karan Kavach is reactivated, averting the airstrike and a potential war.

In a post-credits scene, the team leaves the base, while Kabir survives, hinting at a sequel.

== Cast ==
- Akshay Kumar in dual roles as
  - Captain Firoz “Freddy” alias Bade Miyan
  - Clone Freddy
- Tiger Shroff in dual roles as
  - Captain Rakesh "Rocky" alias Chote Miyan
  - Clone Rocky
- Prithviraj Sukumaran in dual roles as
  - Dr. Kabir
  - Clone Eklavya
- Manushi Chhillar as Captain Misha Kapoor
- Alaya F as Parminder Bawa “Pam”, an IT specialist.
- Sonakshi Sinha as Captain Priya Dixit
- Ronit Roy in dual roles as
  - Colonel Adil Shekhar Azad
  - Clone Azad
- Manish Chaudhari as General Karan Shergill
- Shahab Ali as Captain Vikram
- Pawan Chopra as Indian Defence Secretary
- Khalid Siddiqui as Indian Ambassador
- Kinnar Boruah as Chang
- Mustafa Aksari as Bashir
- Nyorika Bhatheja as the High Commissioner's wife
- Vidhaan Sharma as the High Commissioner's son
- Rohed Khan as a head militant
- Bijay Anand as Jamaluddin
- Omna Harjani as Agent
- Trisha Bisht as a little girl
- Sapan Chaudhary as the little girl's father
- Neelam Khanna as the little girl's mother
- Roshan Shanbagh as Mr. Naved
- Mark Chiu as Mr. Wong
- Anay Prasad as a scientist
- Jordan Turk as an English reporter
- Bo Wang as a Chinese reporter
- Zina Ida as a Russian reporter

== Production ==
=== Development ===
In December 2021, Akshay Kumar and Tiger Shroff were signed for Ali Abbas Zafar's next action film under Pooja Entertainment, which also backed the 1998 film of the same name. Eventually, the film was announced on 8 February 2022. Zafar, apart from being the writer and director, also co-produced it under his own banner, AAZ Films.

=== Casting ===
Manushi Chhillar was signed to play an action-packed role, reuniting with Kumar after Samrat Prithviraj (2022). In December 2022, Prithviraj Sukumaran was roped in to play the main antagonist named Kabir. Sonakshi Sinha was cast in March 2023. Prior to that, Alaya F and Ronit Roy joined the film in January 2023.

=== Filming ===
Principal photography began on 17 January 2023 at Yash Raj Studios in Mumbai. The first schedule included an action scene shot in a set of Bunker before it moved to Film City where other action scenes were shot. On 19 February 2023, Zafar confirmed the first schedule wrap.

On 28 February 2023, the second schedule took place in the United Kingdom in which a major chunk of the film was shot in Scotland, London and Luton before it ended on 12 April 2023. Some high-octane action sequences were filmed featuring cars, bikes, helicopters and tanks. An action scene was shot at night in Paisley where a street was recreated as Shanghai. Kumar also got injured while shooting a bike chase sequence.

On 16 April 2023, last schedule began in Abu Dhabi with the shooting of few portions of the title track at Emirates Palace. Action scenes featuring Cars, Bikes, Tanks, Horses, Dune Buggies, Plane, and Chinook helicopter were shot. A set of Indian Army Airstrip was recreated at Liwa Dessert. Filming wrapped on 9 May 2023 except patchwork.

On 21 January 2024, the filming for four final songs choreographed by Bosco-Caesar kicked off in Jordan with Kumar, and Shroff which took place for 12 days. Firstly the title track was shot at Roman Theatre and other locations of Jerash. Filming then moved to the Dead Sea where a romantic track with Kumar, Shroff, Sinha, Chhillar and Alaya F and a party track which also includes Prithviraj and Roy were shot. Last song shoot took place at Wadi Rum where an Arabic style song was shot. On 1 February 2024, Kumar confirmed the schedule wrap.

=== Post-production ===
The VFX of the film was completed by DNEG.

== Music ==
Bade Miyan Chote Miyan

Soundtrack album by Vishal Mishra
- Released: 28 March 2024
- Genre: Feature film soundtrack
- Length: 15:35
- Language: Hindi
- Label: Zee Music Company

Vishal Mishra chronology
Crew (2024)	Bade Miyan Chote Miyan (2024)	Ruslaan (2024)

Official audio
- Bade Miyan Chote Miyan – Full Album on YouTube

The music of the film is composed by Vishal Mishra with lyrics written by Irshad Kamil, while the background score was composed by Julius Packiam. The first single titled "Bade Miyan Chote Miyan (Title Track)" was released on 19 February 2024. The second single titled "Mast Malang Jhoom" was released on 28 February 2024. The third single titled "Wallah Habibi" was released on 13 March 2024. The title track to the 1998 original, sung by Udit Narayan and Sudesh Bhosale, was recreated and used during a scene in the film.

Track listing
No.	Title	Singer(s)	Length
1.	"Bade Miyan Chote Miyan – Title Track"	Anirudh Ravichander; Vishal Mishra	2:39
2.	"Mast Malang Jhoom"	Arijit Singh; Nikhita Gandhi; Vishal Mishra	3:20
3.	"Wallah Habibi"	Vishal Dadlani; Vishal Mishra; Dipakshi Kalita	2:42
4.	"Rang Ishq Ka"	Vishal Mishra	3:19
5.	"Rang Ishq Ka" (Redux)	Neha Bhasin	3:35
Total length:			15:35

== Marketing ==
On 26 February 2024, a promotional event for the film was held in Lucknow, where Akshay Kumar and Tiger Shroff performed live stunts and interacted with the crowd. The film was promoted at India Today Conclave 2024 in Delhi. On 22 March 2024, Akshay Kumar and Tiger Shroff performed live at the 2024 Indian Premier League opening ceremony. The trailer of the film was launched at an event in Mumbai on 26 March 2024.

== Release ==
=== Theatrical ===
In February 2022, the release date of the film was announced as 22 December 2023 (in the week of Christmas). However, in May 2023, a new release date of Eid 2024 was announced by Pooja Entertainment.

The film was released on 11 April in standard formats, 3D, and IMAX in Hindi alongside dubbed versions in Tamil, Telugu, Malayalam and Kannada languages.

=== Distribution ===
PVR Inox Pictures acquired the theatrical rights for India and Yash Raj Films for overseas.

=== Home media ===
The digital streaming rights were acquired by Netflix. The film began streaming on Netflix from 6 June 2024.

== Reception ==
=== Critical response ===
Bade Miyan Chote Miyan received generally negative reviews from critics. On the review aggregator website Rotten Tomatoes, 17% of 12 critics' reviews are positive, with an average rating of 3.3/10.

Ronak Kotecha of The Times of India gave 3.5/5 stars and wrote "Bade Miyan Chote Miyan goes out all guns blazing to make for an entertaining potboiler with heart-pounding action, cheeky humour and barely a dull moment." Titas Chowdhury of News18 gave 3/5 stars and wrote "Akshay Kumar and Tiger Shroff's fun banters are pure gold. Prithviraj Sukumaran's evil act keeps you on the edge."

Bollywood Hungama gave 2.5/5 stars and wrote "BMCM suffers due to a weak script and poor dialogues, however, it is a decent watch for the fans of Akshay Kumar, Tiger Shroff, and those who patronize action movies." Pratikshya Mishra of The Quint gave 2/5 stars and wrote "Bade Miyan Chote Miyan doesn't, however, rely on portraying its heroes with the same ol’ hypermasculinity – these heroes like to have fun instead.

Zinia Bandyopadhyay of India Today gave 1.5/5 stars and wrote "Ali Abbas Zafar is an OG director when it comes to action. However, here it turns out to be a disappointment." Saibal Chatterjee of NDTV gave 1/5 stars and wrote "Bade Miyan Chote Miyan offers not a single shred that could considered a saving grace. The story is astonishingly hollow."

Anuj Kumar of The Hindu wrote "Writer-director Ali Abbas Zafar's attempt to give the soul of Bollywood tropes an AI finish appeals in parts." Monika Rawal Kukreja of Hindustan Times wrote "For those with a penchant for action films, good, bad or ugly, BMCM will definitely make for a one-time watch."

== Accolades ==
Award	Date of ceremony	Category	Nominee(s)	Result	Ref.
70th Filmfare Awards	12 October 2025	Best Action	Craig Macrae and Parvez Shaikh	Nominated	
Times of India Film Awards	2 December 2025	Critics' Award for Acting Excellence in a Negative Role	Prithviraj Sukumaran	Nominated	
Times of India Film Awards	2 December 2025	Popular Award for Best Performance by an Actor in a Negative Role	Prithviraj Sukumaran	Nominated	
