= Ganapath =

2023 Indian film by Vikas Bahl

Ganapath: A Hero is Born
- Theatrical release poster
- Directed by: Vikas Bahl
- Written by: Vikas Bahl
- Produced by: Vikas Bahl; Jackky Bhagnani; Vashu Bhagnani; Deepshikha Deshmukh
- Starring: Tiger Shroff; Amitabh Bachchan; Kriti Sanon; Elli AvrRam
- Cinematography: Sudhakar Reddy Yakkanti
- Edited by: Ritesh Soni
- Music by: Songs: Vishal Mishra; Amit Trivedi; White Noise Studios; Dr. Zeus; Background Score: Salim–Sulaiman
- Production companies: Good Co; Pooja Entertainment
- Distributed by: PVR Inox Pictures
- Release date: 20 October 2023
- Running time: 133 minutes
- Country: India
- Language: Hindi
- Budget: ₹200 crore
- Box office: ₹19.38 crore

Ganapath: A Hero is Born is a 2023 Indian Hindi-language dystopian sports action film written and directed by Vikas Bahl, who also produced the film with Jackky Bhagnani, Vashu Bhagnani and Deepshikha Deshmukh. It stars Tiger Shroff in a dual role alongside Kriti Sanon, Elli AvrRam and Rahman, while Amitabh Bachchan appears in a cameo appearance.

Announced in November 2020, principal photography commenced the following year and concluded in February 2023 with filming taking place in United Kingdom, Ladakh and Mumbai.

Ganapath was released theatrically on 20 October 2023 and received mixed-to-negative reviews from critics. It was declared a box office bomb.

== Plot ==
In the year 2070, a destructive war leaves the world divided by a towering wall, with the rich people residing in a city called Silver City led by the Dalini, while the poor people survive in a destroyed city and struggle for basic necessities as it is controlled by Silver City.

Meanwhile, Guddu resides in the Silver City and works for Dalini's henchmen John, who conducts boxing matches and earns money through the bets placed by the rich people. One day, John tells Guddu to take Dimple, John's girlfriend, to a nightclub as he is busy with a meeting. Dimple gets physical with Guddu, where John catches them red-handed and buries them alive. Guddu miraculously survives and Kaizad asks him to move away to the city of poor people and meet Shiva, a combat trainer.

Guddu learns that he is actually Ganapath, a legendary saviour of the poor people, as predicted by Maharishi Dalapathi. Guddu receives combat training under Shiva and his confidante Jassi, where he ultimately embraces himself as Ganapath and deceives John, Dalini and their henchmen into believing that he is on their side. Trained as an accomplished fighter, Guddu wins matches for them, while pretending to Jassi and Shiva that he is uninterested in their cause.

After securing victories in most of his matches, Guddu persuades John and Dalini's associate to bet their money on his opponent in the final match as Guddu plans to lose intentionally in the match. Guddu also convinces them to allow the poor to wager their savings on this match, where John and his associates profit further by snatching money from the poor people, leaving them in a miserable state. However, this is Guddu's way of exacting revenge as he intends to follow a different course.

While releasing Jassi from her confinement, Guddu discreetly instructs her to encourage the poor people to place their savings on the match. Guddu executes the plan, which he shared with John, easily dominating his opponent in the first two rounds. In the third round, Guddu feigns defeat, but realises that John has placed his and Dalini's money on the opponent. Guddu stages a comeback and defeats his opponent, causing substantial losses to John and Dalini. Guddu subsequently reveals his actions on television, watched by both the poor and rich people, and confesses that Shiva is his biological father.

Guddu says that he has given a chance for the poor people to challenge the rich people with their winnings, while donning the mantle of Ganapath. Guddu also challenges Dalini to reveal himself, where Dalini reveals himself as Guddu's doppelgänger and it is revealed that Dalini is actually a form of AI. Guddu challenges Dalini to a fight, thus hinting at a sequel titled Ganapath 2: Rise of the Hero.

== Cast ==
- Tiger Shroff in a dual role as
  - Ganapath alias Guddu
  - Dalini
- Amitabh Bachchan as Maharishi Dalapathi, Ganapath's grandfather (cameo appearance)
- Kriti Sanon as Jassi Singh
- Elli AvrRam as Dimple Bajwa
- Rahman as Shiva, Ganapath's father
- Gauahar Khan as Meera, Ganapath's mother
- Jameel Khan as Kaizad
- Girish Kulkarni as Senior
- Shruthy Menon as Shaina
- Ziad Bakri as John English, Dimple's boyfriend
- Jess Liaudin as Tabahi
- Brahim Chab as Bloodbath

== Production ==
=== Development ===
The film was announced on 6 November 2020 by Pooja Entertainment, to be directed by Aditya Kumar starring Tiger Shroff. It was originally supposed to release in parts, and had a working title of Ganapath: Part 1, though this plan was abandoned and the film was re-titled Ganapath: A Hero is Born. Though a sequel is still teased at the ending of the film titled Ganapath: Part 2: Rise of the Hero. The film marks the collaboration of Sanon and Shroff after nine years since their Hindi film debut in Heropanti (2014). It was produced by Pooja Entertainment in association of GoodCo.

=== Filming ===
The principal photography began on 2 November 2021 in United Kingdom. In May 2022, the final schedule was held in Ladakh with some additional scenes being shot in February 2023. The film's shooting was wrapped up by August 2023.

== Soundtrack ==
Ganapath

Soundtrack album by Vishal Mishra, Amit Trivedi, White Noise Studios and Dr. Zeus
- Released: 13 October 2023
- Genre: Feature film soundtrack
- Length: 22:55
- Language: Hindi
- Label: Zee Music Company

Official audio
- Ganapath – Full Album on YouTube

The music of the film is composed by Vishal Mishra, Amit Trivedi, White Noise Studios and Dr. Zeus. The background score is composed by Salim-Sulaiman. The first single titled "Jai Ganesha" was released on 18 September 2023 on the occasion of Ganesh Chaturthi. The second single titled "Hum Aaye Hain" was released on 5 October 2023. On 13 October 2023, the entire album consisting was released by Zee Music Company.

Track listing
No.	Title	Lyrics	Music	Singer(s)	Length
1.	"Hum Aaye Hain"	Priya Saraiya	White Noise Studios	Siddharth Basrur, Prakriti Kakar	3:30
2.	"Jai Ganesha"	Akshay Tripathi	Vishal Mishra	Vishal Mishra	3:36
3.	"Sara Zamana"	Priya Saraiya	White Noise Studios	Benny Dayal, Prakriti Kakar	3:18
4.	"Lafda Kar Le"	Swanand Kirkire	Amit Trivedi	Amit Trivedi, Nikhita Gandhi	5:02
5.	"Time 2 Shine"	Priceless, Dr Zeus, Roach Killa, Ikka Singh	Dr Zeus	Priceless, Roach Killa, Dr Zeus	3:34
6.	"Hum Aaye Hain" (Version 2)	Priya Saraiya	White Noise Studios	Mika Singh, Shilpa Rao	3:55
Total length:					22:55

== Release ==
=== Theatrical ===
The film was initially supposed to release on 23 December 2022, coinciding with Christmas Eve, but was later postponed and was released theatrically on 20 October 2023, during Dussehra, in Hindi, along with the dubbed versions in Tamil, Telugu, Malayalam and Kannada languages.

== Reception ==
=== Critical response ===
Ganapath received mixed-to-negative reviews from critics. On the review aggregator website Rotten Tomatoes, 18% of 11 critics' reviews are positive, with an average rating of 4.5/10. The film received negative reviews from audiences.

Bollywood Hungama gave 2.5/5 stars and wrote "Ganapath – A Hero is Born fails to impress due to a clichéd storyline, poor VFX and predictable second half." Renuka Vyavahare of The Times of India gave 2.5/5 stars and wrote "In a world where the rich are getting richer and poor, poorer, Ganapath imitates our hard-hitting reality but feels like a huge potential wasted."

Avinash Lohana of Pinkvilla gave 2/5 stars and wrote "This futuristic drama headlined by Tiger Shroff and Kriti Sanon needed to do some solid work in the past before bringing it to the audience." Saibal Chatterjee of NDTV gave 1.5/5 stars and wrote "Ganapath is painfully pea-brained pulp that makes a meal of a terribly thin storyline."

Bhavna Agarwal of India Today gave 1.5/5 stars and wrote "'Ganapath' offers absolutely no respite. If you expect it to get better in the second half as Gen Z are often heard saying ‘you are in delulu’." India Today later included the film as one of the five worst Hindi films of 2023. Hiren Kotwani of Mid-Day gave 1.5/5 stars and wrote "What makes Ganapath different from the saviour-hero films of yore is that director Bahl has tried to make it look like the desi Mad Max of sorts, albeit with unimpressive design and poor packaging".

Swetha Ramakrishnan of OTTplay gave 1.5/5 stars and wrote "Ganapath is a dated Hindi film with an identity crisis. It is a scary mish-mash of tropes “borrowed" from films like Hunger Games, Mad Max, Dune and KGF. Shubhra Gupta of The Indian Express gave 1/5 stars and wrote "What comes as a surprise is just how terrible this film is, with practically no redeeming feature in its nearly two and half hours run-time." She later included the film as one of the worst films of 2023.

Anuj Kumar of The Hindu wrote "Tiger Shroff kicks and moves the way only he can, but the Vikas Bahl film doesn’t have the chutzpah to use his talent." Monika Rawal Kukreja of Hindustan Times wrote "Watch Ganapath if you can limit your idea of watching a film to some brilliant dance and action moves, and don't expect anything beyond this."
