= Sarbjit (film) =

2016 Indian film directed by Omung Kumar

- Theatrical release poster
- Directed by: Omung Kumar
- Screenplay by: Utkarshini Vashishtha; Rajesh Beri
- Dialogues by: Utkarshini Vashishtha
- Produced by: Vashu Bhagnani; Jackky Bhagnani; Deepshikha Deshmukh; Bhushan Kumar; Krishnan Kumar; Sandeep Singh
- Starring: Randeep Hooda; Aishwarya Rai Bachchan; Richa Chadda; Darshan Kumar
- Cinematography: Kiran Deohans
- Edited by: Rajesh G. Pandey
- Music by: Tanishk Bagchi; Amaal Mallik; Jeet Gannguli; Shashi Shivam; Shali-Pritesh
- Production companies: Pooja Entertainment; T-Series Films; Legend Studios Pvt. Ltd
- Distributed by: T-Series Films
- Release date: 20 May 2016
- Running time: 131 minutes
- Country: India
- Language: Hindi
- Budget: ₹15 crore
- Box office: ₹43.8 crore

Sarbjit is a 2016 Indian Hindi-language biographical drama film directed by Omung Kumar and produced by Pooja Entertainment, T-Series Films and Legend Studios Pvt. Ltd. The film stars Randeep Hooda as Sarabjit Singh, an Indian national wrongfully convicted of terrorism and spying, with Aishwarya Rai Bachchan as his sister Dalbir Kaur. Richa Chadda, and Darshan Kumar play supporting roles.

Sarbjit was made on a production budget of ₹15 crore and earned ₹43.88 crore worldwide after its two-week theatrical run. It premiered at the 69th Cannes Film Festival and released theatrically on 20 May 2016 to mixed reviews from critics.

== Plot ==
Dalbir Kaur, two years after she suffers the stillbirth of her daughter, leaves her abusive husband Baldev and arrives to stay with Sarbjit's family. She works in a textile mill to support the family alongside Sarbjit. Sarbjit Singh lives in Bhikhiwind, Punjab, with his wife Sukhpreet, their two daughters Poonam and Swapandeep, and his father Darji. He works as a farmer and is a loving younger brother.

In 1990, after becoming drunk, Sarbjit accidentally crosses the border and arrives in Pakistan, where he is convicted as an Indian spy. He is alleged to be Ranjit Singh and accused of causing bomb blasts in Lahore. His claims of innocence are ignored and he is tortured for months before he is able to inform his family of his captivity through a letter. In an attempt to appease the Pakistani police, Sarbjit falsely confesses to terrorism and is promptly given a death sentence. Dalbir, determined to free her brother, enlists the help of lawyer Awais Sheikh. Their plea for justice is supported across India and condemned in Pakistan; the media in both countries continues to cover the case, causing Sarbjit's sentence to be repeatedly delayed.

In 2012, after 22 years of imprisonment, Sarbjit's family was allowed to visit him in jail. They are heartbroken to witness him as a tortured prisoner but he rejoices in the short-lived reunion. Subsequently, his death sentence commutes to life in prison; having already served nearly twice the length of a standard Pakistani life sentence, it is assumed that he will be pardoned and released imminently. The Pakistani government soon clarifies that the release order they issued was not for Sarbjit, but for a prisoner named Surjeet, devastating Sarbjit's family. A year later, Sarbjit is attacked in his jail cell by Pakistani prisoners, and is admitted to a local hospital in critical condition, eventually succumbing to a comatose state. His sister, wife and grown daughters visit him but are forced to leave shortly before his death. Sarbjit's body is delivered to India, where his village and family mourn as they reminisce about his life. As the film ends, Dalbir makes a promise that she will always continue trying to fulfill Sarbjit's dying wish of being recognized as an innocent man.

== Cast ==
- Randeep Hooda as Sarabjit Singh Attwal
- Aishwarya Rai Bachchan as Dalbir Kaur, Sarbjit's sister
- Richa Chadha as Sukhpreet Kaur, Sarbjit's wife
- Darshan Kumar as Awais Sheikh, Sarbjit's lawyer
- Shiwani Saini as Swapan Kaur, Sarbjit's elder daughter
- Ankita Shrivastav as Poonam Kaur, Sarbjit's younger daughter
- Ankur Bhatia as Mandev Singh, Dalbir's husband
- Trishaan Singh Maini as Maninder
- Ram Murti Sharma as Darji, Sarbjit's father
- Shammi Narang in Guest appearance (as himself)

== Production ==
=== Casting and characters ===
Aishwarya Rai Bachchan, Randeep Hooda and Richa Chadda was Omung's first choice for principal characters in the film. On casting Aishwarya, as she does not resemble Dalbir Kaur, Omung said that "It is the story of the character not the resemblance. Everybody told me I was mad to cast Aishwarya. But then, they said similar things when I cast Priyanka Chopra for Mary Kom; that she won't fit the role, she doesn't look North Eastern, and so on. But I’d decided that for Dalbir's part, I wanted someone who's mature enough, who could play a 22-year-old and 60-year-old as well, someone who commands and demands respect when she speaks. Aishwarya is a director's actress, she is a fantastic. We can see her in any role possible, but yes, they talk about her beauty more."

It was reported that Sarabjit's daughters were also keen on Randeep Hooda playing the title role. The actor had lost 18 kg in 28 days. Richa Chadda was selected for the role of Sarbjit's wife. This is her second film opposite Hooda. Darshan Kumar was cast as Pakistani lawyer who fights for Sarabjit in the film. Ankur Bhatia was confirmed to play as Aishwarya Rai Bachchan's husband in the film.

=== Filming ===
The film locations included Punjab, Delhi and Mumbai. Few crucial scenes were shot at the Wagah Border. The director had created the by-lanes of Pakistan in Mumbai Bohri Mohallah, besides Punjab. The protagonist's house was recreated in Aarey Colony in the city though it could have been shot in Tarn Taran (Sarbjit Singh's hometown), the filmmaker reasoned that the town looks a little too modernized for the Punjab of 90s. Since Sarbjit's home was to be shown over a period of two decades, the set was changed accordingly. It was reported on 18 March 2016 that the film shoot was halted for over four hours and producer (Zafar Mehdi) was arrested for hurting national sentiments while shooting a rally sequence with anti-Indian slogans in Urdu. The scene didn't go down well with the locals at Bhendi Bazaar and they filed a complaint against the makers. However Police officials has released Zafar Mehdi as they had valid permission to shoot for the film.

== Release ==
Sarbjit was selected for the Indiwood Panorama Competition at the 2nd edition of Indiwood Carnival 2016 in Hyderabad.

== Music ==
The music for Sarbjit was composed by Jeet Gannguli, Amaal Mallik, Tanishk Bagchi, Shail-Pritesh and Shashi Shivam. The first song "Salamat" was released on 18 April 2016. The music rights of the film were acquired by T-Series.

No.	Title	Lyrics	Music	Singer(s)	Length
1.	"Salamat"	Rashmi Virag	Amaal Mallik	Arijit Singh, Tulsi Kumar	4:30
2.	"Nindiya"	Sandip Ssingh	Shashi-Shivam	Arijit Singh	3:00
3.	"Rabba"	Arafat Mehmood	Tanishk Bagchi	Shafqat Amanat Ali	3:48
4.	"Dard"	Rashmi Virag, Jaani	Jeet Gannguli	Sonu Nigam	4:42
5.	"Allah Hu Allah"	Haider Najmi	Tanishk Bagchi	Shashaa Tirupati, Altamash, Rabbani Mustafa Khan	4:57
6.	"Tung Lak"	Sandip Ssingh	Shail-Pritesh	Sukhwinder Singh, Sunidhi Chauhan, Shail Hada & Kalpana Gandharv	3:25
7.	"Meherbaan"	A M Turaz	Shail-Pritesh	Sukhwinder Singh, Shail Hada, Munnawar Masoom	4:02
8.	"Barsan Laagi"	A M Turaz	Shail–Pritesh	Shail Hada	4:55
9.	"Mera Junoon"	A M Turaz	Shail-Pritesh	Shail Hada	4:06
10.	"Sarbjit Theme"		Shail-Pritesh	Shail Hada
Total length:					35:65

== Reception ==
The film opened to positive response from reviewers, with praise drawn towards its screenplay, engaging realistic portrayal of the situations and editing.

Rachit Gupta from Filmfare gave 4 stars and noted "The actors really save the film. Hooda as Sarbjit is beyond brilliant. Rai Bachchan performance is a bit inconsistent, but scenes where she lets the silences and eyes take over are just marvelous. Richa Chadda plays the stoic wife with just the right amount of underplay. Zee News rated 4 stars said "The biopic will strike a chord for its genuine attempt to share a story not told on the celluloid before, coupled by stellar performances of its lead, particularly the man himself – Randeep Hooda". Critic Shaiju Mathew gave 4 out of 5 stars and said, "The movie is a dark movie with no scope for entertainment but Omung Kumar does a fabulous job with his direction to keep the audience attention captivated. Randeep Hooda has given his career best and gets into the skin of Sarbjit. Aishwarya Rai Bachchan barring few high-octane scenes where she goes overboard with histrionics delivers a strong performance. Bollywood Hungama gave a rating of 3.5 stars mentioned "On the whole, SARBJIT is a landmark film with great performances and a superbly told narrative. Aishwarya Rai Bachchan delivers a performance of a lifetime. Randeep Hooda is outstanding. Richa Chadha makes a solid impact and Darshan Kumaar is effective as the liberal Pakistani lawyer". The Times of India which also gave 3.5 noted "Sarbjit breaks your heart – It makes you cherish your loved ones – and appreciate others too. Randeep imbues Sarbjit with beautiful, powerful humanity". IANS rated 3.5 stars stated "The film is evenly paced with a few lengthy and unwarranted scenes but overall, Sarbjit Aitwal's story is worth a watch, as it touches the right emotional chord. Aishwarya as Dalbir Kaur puts her heart and soul into her character. Randeep Hooda as Sarbjit steals the show". Deccan Chronicle gave the film 3 stars said "Overall, the film takes you on an emotional ride. Randeep's stellar performance may earn him loads of accolades and respect as an actor. Rai Bachchan convincingly portrays Dalbir's ordeal through her role. Scenes between Aishwarya and Randeep in the Pakistan prison will leave you teary eyed".

Anupama Chopra who gave 3 stars for the film explained "What kept me hooked were the performances. Randeep Hooda is terrific and Richa Chadha is excellent as his wife. This is easily Aishwarya's bravest and most challenging role. There are scenes in which she impressively holds her own. But in places she is shrill, and the accent never sits right". Mid-Day rated 3 stars, said "A lot rides on Ash's shoulders as this is the role that demands dollops of courage even when under the most vulnerable of situations". The Tribune gave 3 stars summarized "Well intended and fairly well executed Sarbjit makes the viewing grade. The film essentially belongs to Aishwarya Rai Bachchan, as Dalbir, she has done a sincere act, even though her Punjabi accent is not quite consistent and Randeep is first rate". Rajeev Masand also gave 3 stars to the film and stated "In many ways Sarbjit feels half-baked and wanting. But the performances – particularly Randeep Hooda's – keeps you invested in what's on the screen. It's not a perfect film, but there is enough to appreciate here". Sonia Chopra from Sify rated 3 stars praised the performances of the leads and noted "Kumar does a fair job, but the film bears the brunt of melodrama rearing its head in the form of flashbacks and over-the-top dialogue". Subhash K. Jha described the film as "Gem" and commented "Sarbjit has immense poignancy at its heart. Though Rai Bachchan performance gets shrill at times, it never loses it power. Randeep Hooda's physical transformation as a traumatized prisoner is astonishing and convincing".

DNA rated 2.5 stars commented that "If you want to know about Sarabjit, google it for free. You'll know more than what the film has to offer. As the film's primary driver, Rai fails to do full justice to Dalbir. Randeep Hooda is restrained but again cannot rise beyond the ordinary screenplay". Koimoi gave 2 stars and noted "A contrived plot and over the top performance by Ash makes this movie a lengthy affair. For not doing justice to the actual Sarbjit issue, I’d say this film is passable". NDTV which also gave 2 stars stated "With the star not shining all that bright and the actors in the mix not allowed to play the game their way, Sarbjit is a well-meaning outing that fails to do justice to its subject. Watch it only if you are an Aishwarya Rai-Bachchan fan no matter what". India Today reviewer gave 1.5 stars and mentioned "The blame lies largely in the script which doesn't leave much for its actors to do other than excessively cry or scream or otherwise sit sulking". Shubhra Gupta from The Indian Express gave same rating as 1.5 stars and noted "Randeep Hooda nails the look and the accent, letting neither overpower him, and is the only reason to sit through this sagging saga. If Aishwarya had modulated her act, ‘Sarbjit’ would have been a better film". Raja Sen of Rediff gave 1.5 stars said "Sarbjit is an irresponsibly sloppy film, a film so focused on artless emotional manipulation and trying to make the audience weep, that it trivialises an important true-life story". The Hindu reviewer Namrata Joshi commented that " Instead of a coherent narrative the film feels utterly disjointed and on top of that the director doesn't seem to know how to calibrate emotions well. He goes overboard with melodrama".

== Box office ==
At the end of second week, the film has grossed ₹439 million (US$4.6 million) worldwide and became a financially profitable at the box office.

== Accolades ==
Award (Note: Awards, festivals and organizations are in alphabetical order.)	Date of ceremony (Note: Date is linked to the article about the awards held that year, wherever possible.)	Category	Recipient(s)	Result	Ref.
BIG ZEE Entertainment Awards	29 July 2017	Most Entertaining Drama Film	Sarbjit	Nominated	
BIG ZEE Entertainment Awards	29 July 2017	Most Entertaining Actor in a Drama Film – Male	Randeep Hooda	Nominated	
BIG ZEE Entertainment Awards	29 July 2017	Most Entertaining Actor in a Drama Film – Female	Aishwarya Rai Bachchan	Won	
BIG ZEE Entertainment Awards	29 July 2017	Most Entertaining Actor – Female	Aishwarya Rai Bachchan	Nominated	
Filmfare Awards	14 January 2017	Best Actress	Aishwarya Rai Bachchan	Nominated	
Filmfare Awards	14 January 2017	Best Supporting Actress	Richa Chadda	Nominated	
Indian Film Festival & Awards of Australia (IFFAA)	13 May 2017	Best Actress	Aishwarya Rai Bachchan	Won	
International Indian Film Academy Awards	14–15 July 2017	Best Supporting Actress	Richa Chadda	Nominated	
Matri Shree Media Award	7 May 2017	Best Feature Film	Sarbjit	Won	
Mirchi Music Awards	18 February 2017	Upcoming Music Composer of The Year	Tanishk Bagchi – (for "Allah Hu Allah")	Nominated	
Mirchi Music Awards	18 February 2017	Raag-Inspired Song of the Year	"Meherbaan"	Won	
News18 Movie Awards	20 March 2017	Best Supporting Actor	Randeep Hooda	Won	
Stardust Awards	21 December 2016	Best Film of the Year	Sarbjit	Nominated	
Stardust Awards	21 December 2016	Filmmaker of the Year	Omung Kumar	Nominated	
Stardust Awards	21 December 2016	Performer of the Year – Male	Randeep Hooda	Nominated	
Stardust Awards	21 December 2016	Performer of the Year – Female	Aishwarya Rai Bachchan	Won	
Stardust Awards	21 December 2016	Best Supporting Actress	Richa Chadda	Nominated	
