= Deepshikha Deshmukh =

Indian Film Producer and Entrepreneur (born October 1983)

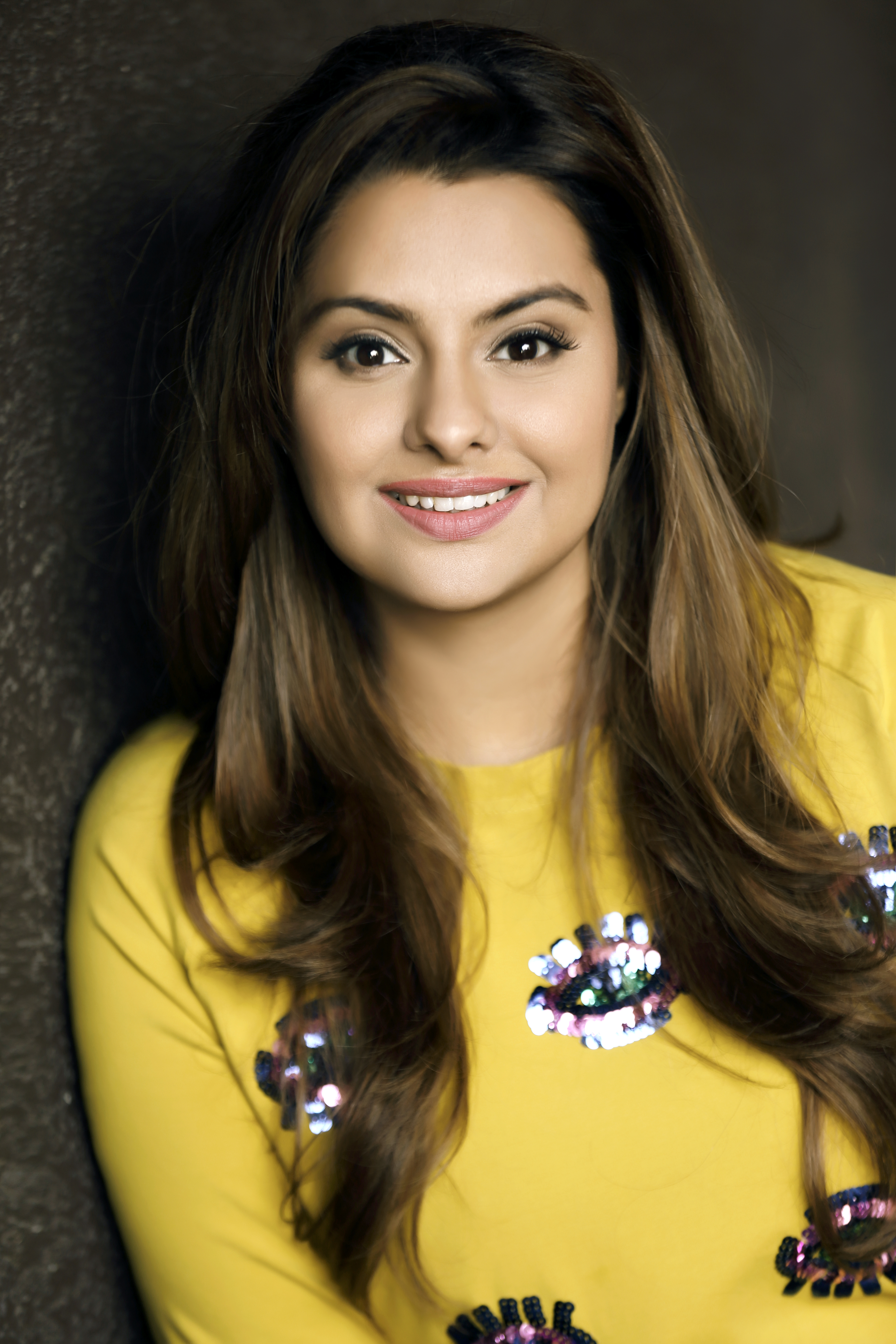
- Deshmukh in 2021
- Born: Deepshikha Bhagnani; 29 October 1983 (age 42); Calcutta, West Bengal, India
- Occupations: Film producer; entrepreneur
- Notable work: Sarbjit, Madaari, Jawaani Jaaneman
- Spouse: Dhiraj Deshmukh
- Children: 2
- Father: Vashu Bhagnani
- Relatives: Jackky Bhagnani (brother); See Deshmukh family

Deepshikha Deshmukh (née Bhagnani; born 29 October 1983) is an Indian film producer who works in the Hindi cinema industry.

Deshmukh has produced multiple films under the production house Pooja Entertainment. She has worked as a producer on several Bollywood movies, including the 2020 releases Jawaani Jaaneman and Coolie No. 1. Deshmukh has also founded the organic skincare brand Love Organically.

== Early life ==
Deshmukh was born on 29 October 1983, in Calcutta, West Bengal, to film producer Vashu Bhagnani and his wife, Pooja Bhagnani. She has a younger brother, Jackky Bhagnani, who is an actor and film producer.

== Career ==
Deepshikha Deshmukh leads the strategy and production efforts at Pooja Entertainment.She is noted for backing films centring on social issues. She debuted as a producer in 2016 with the Aishwarya Rai Bachchan and Randeep Hooda starrer Sarbjit. She has also opted for subject-oriented films like Madaari starring Irrfan Khan. She also partnered with Priyanka Chopra as a producer for Pooja Entertainment's first Punjabi film Sarvann.

In 2018, she produced the film Welcome to New York. The film starred Sonakshi Sinha, Diljit Dosanjh, and Karan Johar. In the same year, she also produced Dil Juunglee starring Taapsee Pannu and Saqib Saleem.

In 2020, she produced the film Jawaani Jaaneman, starring Saif Ali Khan, Tabu, and Alaya F in the lead. The film also marked Alaya's debut in the film industry. At the end of the same year, Coolie No. 1, which was a remake of the 1995 film of the same name, was released on Amazon Prime Video. The original film and the remake were both produced by Pooja Entertainment.

Deshmukh's next film as a producer was a spy thriller called Bell Bottom starring Akshay Kumar as the lead alongside Vaani Kapoor, Lara Dutta, and Huma Qureshi, released in 2021. It turned out to be a commercial failure. She worked as a producer on an action drama, Ganapath starring Tiger Shroff and Kriti Sanon, and her upcoming project as a producer is a multilingual historical drama Suryaputra Mahavir Karna, directed by R.S. Vimal.

== Personal life ==
She is married to Dhiraj Vilasrao Deshmukh, MLA from Latur Rural constituency, Maharashtra and has two children. Her husband is the younger brother of actor Riteish Deshmukh and the younger son of late politician Vilasrao Deshmukh. Her nickname is Honey.

== Filmography ==
Key
| † | Denotes films that have not yet been released |

As Producer

| Year | Title |
|---|---|
| 2016 | Sarbjit |
| 2016 | Madaari |
| 2016 | Tutak Tutak Tutiya |
| 2017 | Sarvann |
| 2018 | Welcome To New York |
| 2018 | Dil Juunglee |
| 2020 | Jawaani Jaaneman |
| 2020 | Coolie No. 1 |
| 2021 | BellBottom |
| 2022 | Cuttputlli |
| 2023 | Mission Raniganj |
| 2023 | Ganapath |
| 2024 | Bade Miyan Chote Miyan |

== Awards and recognition ==
- Dr Babasaheb Ambedkar National Awards 2023
