= Bade Miyan Chote Miyan (1998 film) =

1998 Indian film by David Dhawan

- Poster
- Directed by: David Dhawan
- Written by: Rumi Jaffery
- Produced by: Vashu Bhagnani
- Starring: Amitabh Bachchan; Govinda; Ramya Krishnan; Raveena Tandon; Paresh Rawal; Anupam Kher; Satish Kaushik; Sharat Saxena; Asrani
- Cinematography: K. S. Prakash Rao
- Edited by: A. Muthu
- Music by: Viju Shah
- Production company: Pooja Entertainment
- Release date: 16 October 1998
- Running time: 142 minutes
- Country: India
- Language: Hindi
- Budget: ₹12 crore
- Box office: ₹35.21 crore (equivalent to ₹159 crore or US$16 million in 2023)

Bade Miyan Chote Miyan (transl. Big Mister and Little Mister) is a 1998 Indian Hindi-language buddy cop action comedy film directed by David Dhawan and produced by Vashu Bhagnani under Pooja Entertainment. The film, which was the first Hindi film to be shot in the Ramoji Film City, stars Amitabh Bachchan and Govinda playing dual roles, alongside Raveena Tandon, Ramya Krishnan, Anupam Kher, Paresh Rawal, Sharat Saxena, Satish Kaushik, and Asrani. The core plot of the film is borrowed from Bengali film Bhranti Bilas (1963), a reworking of William Shakespeare's The Comedy of Errors, and also is an adaptation of the 1995 American film Bad Boys.

Bade Miyan Chote Miyan was theatrically released on 16 October 1998 and became 4th highest grossing Hindi films of 1998, despite clashing with Karan Johar's Kuch Kuch Hota Hai.

== Plot ==
Inspectors Arjun Singh and Pyare Mohan Bhargava share a friendly bond. Arjun is unmarried, and some petty comments are made about his age, while his sister Seema is dating Pyare. Zorawar Siddiqui, a smuggler, works under the cover of being a sculptor in a hotel. Zorawar gets rid of Madhu, an eyewitness who is spying on him. Madhu's friend Neha witnesses her murder and calls the police. Arjun arrives there, and he takes her to Pyare's house.

Bade Miyan and Chote Miyan are petty thieves and doppelgängers of Arjun and Pyare. Bade and Chote arrive in town, and confusion ensues when every crime they commit is blamed on Arjun and Pyare. Things go further downhill when Commissioner Shyamlal is also thrashed by Bade and Chote. Seema and Neha also mistake Bade and Chote for Arjun and Pyare. Arjun and Pyare land in trouble when Zorawar kidnaps Seema. They are arrested, but get saved by the arrival of Bade and Chote, who reveal their acts and promise to get Seema back.

They arrive at Zorawar's hideout and stall them while Arjun and Pyare arrive with the police force, and everyone at the hideout is arrested. Bade and Chote leave after apologising to Seema for the confusion. Zorawar's henchmen hijack the police van, which is taking him and his associates to prison. They are stopped by Bade and Chote, asking for a lift. Chote realises the truth and gets Zorawar and his men arrested. Arjun and Pyare are criticised for their mistake regarding the van's hijacking, and Bade and Chote are given a job in the police force. Arjun and Pyare end up being demoted as traffic officers, while Bade and Chote take their place as Inspectors.

== Cast ==
- Amitabh Bachchan in dual roles as
  - Vijay Nigam (Bade Miyan); Sunil's brother
  - Inspector Arjun Singh; Neha's boyfriend
- Govinda in dual roles as
  - Sunil Nigam (Chote Miyan); Vijay's brother
  - Inspector Pyare Mohan Bhargava; Seema's boyfriend
- Raveena Tandon as Seema Singh; Pyare Mohan's love interest
- Ramya Krishnan as Neha Ahuja; Arjun's love interest
- Anupam Kher as Police Commissioner Shyamlal Tripathi
- Paresh Rawal as Zorawar Raaz Ali
- Sharat Saxena as Suryadhar Malik
- Mahavir Shah as Amrish Chawla
- Kader Khan as Waiter Tajendra Chaturvedi/Kadar bhai
- Satish Kaushik as Sharafat Ali
- Sushma Seth as Vaijanti Singh
- Divya Dutta as Madhu Sabharwal
- Rakesh Bedi as Watchman Kaushik Desai
- Asrani as Museum Security Officer Khairatlal
- Avtar Gill as Sundar Kala
- Razzak Khan as Prisoner Khaleem Dheele
- Tiku Talsania as Jeweller Narayan Das
- Shehzad Khan as Inspector Vikas Bhalla, who recorded Zorawar's meeting
- David Dhawan as himself
- Viju Khote as Passenger Damodar
- Manmauji as Passenger Akram
- Madhuri Dixit as herself

== Music ==
Bade Miyan Chote Miyan

Soundtrack album by Viju Shah
- Released: 25 August 1998
- Recorded: Daman Sood
- Venue: Mumbai
- Studio: Western Outdoor
- Genre: Feature film soundtrack
- Length: 38:58
- Language: Hindi
- Labels: Tips Cassettes & Records
- Producer: Viju Shah

Viju Shah chronology
Gupt: The Hidden Truth (1997)	Bade Miyan Chote Miyan (1998)	Beti No. 1 (1999)

The music album of the film, composed by Viju Shah with lyrics by Sameer, was released on 25 August 1998. Similar to Shah's prior compositions for films like Mohra and Gupt that became popular, the album showed his offbeat mode of music yielding the tuneful numbers like the title track "Bade Miyan Chote Miyan", the zippy bhangra number "Makhna" and the groovy "Kisi Disco Mein Jaaye".

Vocals are supplied by Udit Narayan for Govinda, and Amit Kumar and Sudesh Bhosle for Bachchan. Singers featured in the soundtrack include Alka Yagnik, Anuradha Paudwal, Kavita Krishnamurthy, and Jaspinder Narula.

All lyrics are written by Sameer; all music is composed by Viju Shah.

Songs
No.	Title	Playback	Length
1.	"Bade Miyan Chote Miyan"	Udit Narayan, Sudesh Bhosle	05:57
2.	"Makhna"	Alka Yagnik, Udit Narayan, Amit Kumar	05:01
3.	"Kisi Disco Mein Jaaye"	Udit Narayan, Alka Yagnik	05:26
4.	"Assi Chutki Nabbe Taal"	Udit Narayan, Sudesh Bhonsle	05:29
5.	"Deta Jai Jo Re" (I)	Anuradha Paudwal, Kavita Krishnamurthy, Udit Narayan, Amit Kumar	05:14
6.	"Dhin Tak Dhin"	Jaspinder Narula, Sudesh Bhosle	05:02
7.	"Deta Jai Jo Re" (II)	Alka Yagnik, Kavita Krishnamurthy, Udit Narayan, Sudesh Bhonsle	05:14
8.	"Assi Chutki Nabbe Taal" (II)	Sudesh Bhonsle, Udit Narayan	01:53

== Awards ==
Zee Cine Awards 1999

Winner

- Zee Cine Award for Best Actor in a Comic Role – Govinda

Videocon Screen Awards 1999

Videocon Screen Awards Best Actor (Jury) – Govinda

44th Filmfare Awards:

Nominated

- Best Actor – Govinda
- Best Music Director – Viju Shah

== See also ==
- Ulta Palta (disambiguation), title of various other Indian films based on the play
- Bade Miyan Chote Miyan, a 2024 film by Ali Abbas Zafar named after this film and also produced by Vashu Bhagnani under Pooja Entertainment
