= Bell Bottom (2021 film) =

2021 Indian film by Ranjit M. Tewari

- Theatrical release poster
- Directed by: Ranjit M. Tewari
- Written by: Aseem Arrora; Parveez Shaikh
- Produced by: Vashu Bhagnani; Jackky Bhagnani; Deepshikha Deshmukh; Monisha Advani; Madhu Bhojwani; Nikkhil Advani
- Starring: Akshay Kumar; Vaani Kapoor; Lara Dutta
- Cinematography: Rajeev Ravi
- Edited by: Chandan Arora
- Music by: Songs: Amaal Mallik; Tanishk Bagchi; Shantanu Dutta; Gurnazar; Maninder Buttar; Background Score: Daniel B. George
- Production companies: Pooja Entertainment; Emmay Entertainment
- Distributed by: Pen Marudhar Entertainment
- Release date: 19 August 2021
- Running time: 123 minutes
- Country: India
- Language: Hindi
- Budget: ₹150 crore
- Box office: est. ₹50.58 crore

Bell Bottom is a 2021 Indian Hindi-language action thriller film directed by Ranjit M. Tewari. The film is written by Aseem Arrora and Parveez Sheikh, and produced by Vashu Bhagnani, Jackky Bhagnani, Deepshikha Deshmukh and Nikkhil Advani under their respective banners Pooja Entertainment and Emmay Entertainment. It stars Akshay Kumar as the lead character, with Vaani Kapoor, Lara Dutta and Huma Qureshi in an extended cameo appearance. Bell Bottom is inspired from real life hijacking events in India by Khalistani terrorists during the 1980s, such as the Indian Airlines Flight 423, 405 and 421 hijackings.

Principal photography began on 20 August 2020. The film was wrapped up on 30 September in London. The film released in theatres on 19 August 2021 in 3D. The film received mixed reviews from critics, with praise for Kumar's and Dutta's performances, art direction, screenplay, background score and cinematography but criticism for the poor visual effects and climax. Such mixed reviews, combined with the second wave of COVID-19 and the ensuing lockdown across various states, made it a major commercial failure.

== Plot ==
In 1984, Indian Airlines Flight 691 (resembling Indian Airlines Flight 421) is hijacked, the seventh such hijacking in India in five years, with all the previous ones ending in acquiescence to the hijackers' demands that other terrorists be freed and money be delivered. During her briefing, Prime Minister Indira Gandhi, frustrated at the lack of action taken on the matter, decides to allow a RAW agent code-named "Bell Bottom" to handle the case. As a "mere" clerk, he is already viewed with consternation by the other officials, and his deduction that the alleged masterminds, a Khalistan separatist group named "Azaadi Dal" (lit. 'Liberation Organisation'), are merely a front for Pakistan's ISI is rebuffed by them due to improving Indo-Pakistani relations. After the plane lands in Amritsar when he predicted it would land in Lahore, he is dismissed. However, his supervisor points out that he is an expert on hijacking analysis and is motivated by personal experience.

In 1979, polymath Anshul Malhotra lives with his wife Radhika and his mother Raavi, an asthmatic who frequently visits his brother in London. Raavi's flight is hijacked by terrorists, but then-PM Morarji Desai and Pakistani President Muhammad Zia-ul-Haq negotiate and fulfill the hijackers demands in exchange for the hostages' release. However, Raavi dies, reportedly due to natural causes. Soon after, though, Anshul is abducted by RAW, who reveal that one of the hijackers, Daljeet "Doddy" Singh, had purposely withheld her inhaler, pushed her into the galley and thrown heavy blankets on her, increasing her suffering as she died. Anshul is given the offer to join RAW; he accepts and takes on the code-name Bell Bottom, with his cover to his wife being that he is an embassy officer. After his training, which showcases his extraordinary memory and improves his previously subpar physical skills, he is assigned to the hijacking desk. In 1983, he finds one of the hijackers while visiting his brother in London and tracks them; he raids their house with other RAW agents and captures three of them but the fourth, Doddy Singh, escapes in disguise.

Back in the present, the plane takes off from Amritsar and lands in Lahore, prompting Gandhi to order Anshul back in. He convinces her to "break script" and disallow the Pakistani side to send their negotiating team, and orders them not to refuel the plane. In response, Zia sends his minister to keep track of the situation. In Lahore, the minister replaces the hijacker with Doddy and supplies weapons and explosives. Correctly figuring out that they will go to the Middle East to take advantage of their naivete in aerial terrorism, Anshul prepares for a covert operation in Dubai against the Indian ministers' wishes. Meanwhile, the Pakistani minister goes to Dubai to observe what is going on and guide Doddy.

Upon arrival, Anshul and his team, disguised as diplomatic aides, meet up with Adeela Rehman, a contact in the Dubai airport, where they see Dubai's emphasis on humanitarianism and avoidance of bloodshed. Their first plan, covertly entering the aircraft and disarming the hijackers, is foiled when the Pakistani minister notices and closes the cargo door. Anshul's "plan B", sending in the Indian army, is also curtailed when the Dubai officials are notified and the ship they are on is denied entry. With all avenues closed, the ministers go to negotiate; although they agree to the terrorists' demands of money, more terrorist releases, and a chartered flight to London, they are surprised at the terrorists' extreme inhumanity as one hostage, a VIP target, is to be held until they get to London.

Seemingly out of options, Anshul asks Adeela to take them to an under-construction terminal so they can view the proceedings; however, this is a ruse as Anshul reveals his knowledge of Adeela's betrayal and ties her up. Disguising themselves as airport workers, they take advantage of a sandstorm to get on the field, free the VIPs, and capture the terrorists, redirecting the chartered flight to India. The Emir of Dubai denies them take off clearance at first, but after Anshul explains how their methods fit in with Dubai's humanism, he grants it. In India, the terrorists are booked, with Zia and the ISI leaders huffing in disgrace, and the flight is returned, with all on board safe and sound and reunited with their families. In the end, it is revealed that Radhika was actually working for RAW and had informed them of her husband's abilities and background in the first place.

== Cast ==
- Akshay Kumar as Anshul Malhotra / RAW Agent Bell Bottom
- Vaani Kapoor as Radhika Malhotra, Anshul's wife
- Lara Dutta as PM Indira Gandhi
- Huma Qureshi as ISI Informer Adeela Rehman
- Ashok Chhabra as Morarji Desai
- Siddhant Ghegadmal as Harish Salgaonkar
- Adil Hussain as N. F. Santook, Anshul's boss
- Denzil Smith as R. N. Kao
- Aniruddh Dave as Sameer "Puchchi" Mehra
- Thalaivasal Vijay as P. V. Narasimha Rao
- Zain Khan Durrani as Daljeet "Doddy" Singh aka Doddy, a terrorist and the main antagonist
- Dolly Ahluwalia as Raavi Malhotra, Anshul's mother
- Mamik Singh as Ashish "Aashu" Malhotra, Anshul's brother
- Abhijit Lahiri as Khurshed Alam Khan
- Sumit Kaul as Dollar
- Sunit Tandon as ISI Chief
- Sanat Sawant as Raj
- Jatin Negi as Sundar
- Akash as Agent
- Amit Kumar Vashisth as Saand
- Kavi Raj as Gen. Muhammad Zia-ul-Haq
- Husam Chadat as Farhad Bin Sultan
- Anjali Anand as Anshul's sister-In-Law
- Ashok Chhabra as Morarji Desai
- Balram Gupta as Home Minister
- Girish Sharma as Anshul's friend
- Nitin Khanna as Dubai Policeman
- Karim Saidi as Abu Mukhtar
- Deesh Mariwala as Tejeshwar
- Ahmed Yahya Berrada as IB Official of Dubai
- Dilraj Singh Brar (Dilraj Brar) as Boy coming off train with his mother
- Shivani Sopori

== Production ==
The film was officially announced in November 2019. Based on true events, Bell Bottom is set during 1980s about some unforgettable heroes of the era. It became the first film to begin shooting post COVID-19 pandemic in India. Principal photography was completed in a single schedule from 20 August to 30 September 2020 in Glasgow and London.

== Release ==
The film was initially set for theatrical release on 22 January 2021 but was later moved to 2 April, then to 28 May and later to 27 July 2021 as it faced delays due to the COVID-19 pandemic. Post the second wave of the pandemic in India, it was the first film to release theatrically except in Maharashtra theatres that were closed at that time. The film released on 19 August 2021 in 3D. It premiered on Amazon Prime Video on 16 September, and in Maharashtra cinemas on 22 October 2021.

== Soundtrack ==
Bell Bottom

Soundtrack album by Amaal Mallik, Tanishk Bagchi, Shantanu Dutta, Gurnazar and Maninder Buttar
- Released: 24 August 2021
- Recorded: 2020
- Genre: Feature film soundtrack
- Length: 21:08
- Language: Hindi
- Label: Saregama Music

The film score is composed by Daniel B. George while Julius Packiam composed the trailer score. The songs featured in the film are composed by Amaal Mallik, Tanishk Bagchi, Shantanu Dutta, Gurnazar and Maninder Buttar while lyrics are written by Rashmi Virag, Tanishk Bagchi, Babbu Maan, Maninder Buttar, Seema Saini and Gurnazar.

The song Sakhiyan2.0 was a remake of the 2018 Punjabi song Sakhiyan by Maninder Buttar.

Track listing
No.	Title	Lyrics	Music	Singer(s)	Length
1.	"Bell Bottom Theme - Dhoom Tara"	Tanishk Bagchi	Tanishk Bagchi	Zara Khan	2:05
2.	"Marjaawaan"	Gurnazar	Gurnazar	Gurnazar, Asees Kaur	3:45
3.	"Sakhiyan2.0"	Babbu Maan, Maninder Buttar, Tanishk Bagchi	Maninder Buttar, Tanishk Bagchi	Maninder Buttar, Zara Khan	2:57
4.	"Tum Aaogey"	Rashmi Virag	Amaal Mallik	Armaan Malik	4:44
5.	"Khair Mangde"	Seema Saini	Shantanu Dutta	Pratibha Singh Baghel	3:49
6.	"Khair Mangde" (Male Version)	Seema Saini	Shantanu Dutta	Darshan Raval	3:48
Total length:					21:08

== Box office ==
Bell Bottom earned ₹2.75 crore at the domestic box office on its opening day. On the second day, the film collected ₹8.60 crore. On the third day, the film collected ₹3 crore. On the fourth day, the film collected ₹36.40 crore, taking total opening weekend domestic collection to ₹52.75 crore.

As of 1 October 2021, The film grossed ₹36.46 crore in India and ₹14.12 crore overseas, the film has a worldwide gross collection of ₹50.58 crore.

== Reception ==
On the review aggregator website Rotten Tomatoes, 54% of 13 critics' reviews are positive, with an average rating of 5.2/10.

Suchin Mehrotra writing for Film Companion criticised the screenplay of the movie saying that, “in the end, somewhere buried within Bell Bottom are the building blocks of a great thriller. It's just shrouded in simplistic storytelling and ‘hijacked’ by the pressures of the big Hindi movie formula.” Monika Rawal Kukreja of The Hindustan Times praised the film for being an edge-of-the-seat thriller.

== Controversy ==
The film was banned in three Gulf countries, namely Saudi Arabia, Kuwait and Qatar. The film certification authorities banned it on grounds of tampering with historical facts. It was pointed out that the 1984 incident actually had the United Arab Emirates Defence Minister Mohammed bin Rashid Al Maktoum and the UAE authorities getting the hijackers, while the film portrayed Kumar's character and his team as the real heroes of the mission.

== See also ==
- "Mere Sapno Ki Rani", song shown in the film
- Bell-bottoms
- 1980s in Indian fashion
- 1980 in India
- Operation Tupac
- List of accidents and incidents involving airliners by location#India
- List of accidents and incidents involving airliners by airline (D–O)#I
