= F.A.L.T.U =

2011 Indian film by Remo D'Souza

F.A.L.T.U.
- Theatrical release poster
- Directed by: Remo D'Souza
- Screenplay by: Mayur Puri; Tushar Hiranandani
- Dialogues by: Mayur Puri; Vipul Binjola; Rishi Virmani; Sameer Sharma; Aakash Kaushik
- Story by: Sachin Bajaj
- Based on: Accepted by Steve Pink
- Produced by: Vashu Bhagnani
- Starring: Arshad Warsi; Riteish Deshmukh; Jackky Bhagnani; Puja Gupta; Chandan Roy Sanyal; Angad Bedi
- Cinematography: Vijay Kumar Arora
- Edited by: Manan Sagar
- Music by: Sachin–Jigar
- Distributed by: Puja Entertainment Ltd
- Release date: April 1, 2011
- Running time: 127 minutes
- Country: India
- Language: Hindi
- Budget: ₹20 crore

F.A.L.T.U (short for Fakirchand and Lakirchand Trust University, transl. Useless) is a 2011 Indian Hindi-language comedy film directed by Remo D'Souza and produced by Vashu Bhagnani, under the banner Puja Entertainment. Its plot is heavily borrowed from the 2006 Hollywood comedy, Accepted.

It stars Jackky Bhagnani, Puja Gupta, Chandan Roy Sanyal, Angad Bedi, Riteish Deshmukh and Arshad Warsi, while Akbar Khan and Darshan Jariwala appear in supporting roles. The film was released on 1 April 2011.

== Plot ==
A group of friends: Ritesh, Nanj, and Puja receive extremely poor marks in their exams. One of their close friends, Vishnu, has passed with top marks under his father's pressure and has enrolled in the best high school in India.

To make their parents happy and proud, the four friends create a fictitious university titled "Fakirchand and Lakirchand Trust University" (F.A.L.T.U.) with the assistance of Ritesh's childhood friend, Google. Things take a turn for the worse when their parents wish to visit F.A.L.T.U. To set things right, Ritesh and Google hire someone, Bajirao, to act as the principal for a day. However, after the parents' visit, a number of children apply to F.A.L.T.U., believing it to be a real university. Unable to turn them away, the trio, along with Vishnu, Google, and Bajirao, transform F.A.L.T.U. into an officially recognised trust university.

Soon enough, the government files a case against every student and member of F.A.L.T.U. for creating a fraudulent college. Now, the group of friends must fight for their rights and keep F.A.L.T.U. as a university to provide education for the children. Near the end, there is a song competition in which the trio, along with the college, sneak in. It comes as a shock that, when the members of F.A.L.T.U. finish their performance, Vishnu's father, who had filed the case against them, stands up and claps, unaware of which college was performing due to the dim lighting.

The education minister asks Ritesh about F.A.L.T.U. and its purpose, to which Ritesh delivers a speech about the education system and how F.A.L.T.U. addresses its shortcomings. In the end, the college is granted a licence to operate for three years as an official institution, and Vishnu's father finally accepts the college along with him.

== Cast ==
- Arshad Warsi as Google Chand
- Ritesh Deshmukh as "Principal" Bajirao
- Jackky Bhagnani as Ritesh Virani
- Puja Gupta as Puja Nigam
- Chandan Roy Sanyal as Vishnu Vardhan
- Angad Bedi as Niranjan "Nanj" Nair
- Boman Irani as Principal Sharma (special appearance)
- Darshan Jariwala as Jeevanlal
- Akbar Khan as Mr. Vardhan
- Mahesh Thakur as Mr. Nigam
- Vijay Kashyap as Mr. Nair
- Vivek Vaswani as Examiner
- Himani Shivpuri as herself/ Contest Judge
- Mithun Chakraborty as himself/Contest Judge (special appearance)
- Remo D'Souza as himself/Content Judge (special appearance)

== Soundtrack ==
F.A.L.T.U

Soundtrack album by Sachin–Jigar
- Released: 20 February 2011
- Genre: Film soundtrack
- Label: Sony Music
- Producer: Sachin–Jigar

Sachin–Jigar chronology
Life Partner (2009)	F.A.L.T.U (2011)	Shor in the City (2011)

The soundtrack is composed by Sachin–Jigar with lyrics penned by Sameer.

#	Title	Singer(s)
1	"Le Jaa Tu Mujhe"	Atif Aslam
2	"Char Baj Gaye"	Hard Kaur
3	"Rab Sab Se Sona"	Neeraj Shridhar, Apeksha Dandekar
4	"Awaaz"	Jigar Saraiya
5	"Faltu"	Mika Singh, Hard Kaur
6	"Gale Laga Le"	Vijay Prakash, Priya Panchal
7	"Nayee Subah"	Jigar Saraiya
8	"O Teri"	Jigar Saraiya
9	"Percentage"	Neuman Pinto
10	"Beh Chala"	Neeraj Shridhar
11	"Bhoot"	Lehmber Hussainpuri

== Reception ==
=== Critical response ===
Taran Adarsh of Bollywood Hungama gave the film 3.5 out of 5, writing, "On the whole, F.A.L.T.U. banks heavily on the formula that the youth loves. It's funny, energetic and has a big ace in its smash hit musical score. I would go to the extent of saying that the movie works because it doesn't pretend to be path-breaking. It offers what the audience desires: Entertainment!" Ankur Pathak of Rediff.com gave the film 3 out of 5, writing, "Most of FALTU is pleasing. Although the premise is unrealistic, to stretch the parameters that decide authenticity, the movie convinces you, and moreover, even in its fabricated fashion, it does succeed in confronting the flaws in our educational scenario."

Conversely, Shubhra Gupta of The Indian Express gave the film 2,5 out of 5, writing, "If you are a college-goer, or an on-the-verge-of-college teen, chances are you might enjoy F.A.L.T.U." Mayank Shekhar of Hindustan Times gave the film 1.5 out of 5, writing, "Few titles express public sentiment better than this film’s. It’s called Faltu only, to use popular Indian expression. And that’s what most will assume the film to be – wasteful."

=== Accolades ===
Award Ceremony	Category	Recipient	Result	Ref.
4th Mirchi Music Awards	Best Programmer & Arranger of the Year	"Chaar Baj Gaye"	Nominated	
