= Welcome to New York (2018 film) =

2018 Indian film by Chakri Toleti

Welcome To New York
- Theatrical release poster
- Directed by: Chakri Toleti
- Written by: Dheeraj Rattan
- Produced by: Deepshikha Deshmukh; Vashu Bhagnani; Jackky Bhagnani; Andre Timmins; Viraf Sarkari; Sabbas Joseph
- Starring: Diljit Dosanjh; Sonakshi Sinha; Karan Johar; Ritesh Deshmukh; Boman Irani; Lara Dutta
- Cinematography: Santosh Thundiyil; Neha Parti Matiyani
- Edited by: Ritesh Soni
- Music by: Sajid–Wajid; Meet Bros; Shamir Tandon
- Production company: Wiz Films
- Distributed by: Pooja Entertainment; Eros International; Magic Cloud Media & Entertainment
- Release date: 23 February 2018
- Running time: 117 minutes
- Country: India
- Language: Hindi
- Box office: ₹6.95 crore

Welcome To New York is a 2018 Indian Hindi-language 3D comedy film, directed by Chakri Toleti, produced by Vashu Bhagnani and his son Jackky Bhagnani, and starring Diljit Dosanjh, Sonakshi Sinha, Karan Johar, Ritesh Deshmukh, Boman Irani, and Lara Dutta. The film was released on 23 February 2018.

== Plot ==
Teji (Diljit Dosanjh), a sloppy recovery agent who dreams of being an actor, and Jeenal Patel (Sonakshi Sinha), a fashion designer, become part of a big Bollywood event (IIFA) in New York. In between Karan Johar gets kidnapped but it is revealed that he is not Karan but Arjun.

== Cast ==
=== Main cast ===
- Diljit Dosanjh as Teji
- Sonakshi Sinha as Jeenal Patel
- Karan Johar as himself/Arjun
- Lara Dutta as Sophie
- Boman Irani as Mr. Garry
- Ritesh Deshmukh as himself
- Rajendra Shastri as Jeenal Patel's grandfather
- Sammy Jonas Heaney as Johnathon

=== Cameo appearances as themselves ===
- Preity Zinta
- Sushant Singh Rajput
- Rana Daggubati
- Salman Khan
- Suniel Shetty
- Katrina Kaif
- Tiger Shroff
- Aditya Roy Kapur
- Disha Patani
- Shahid Kapoor
- Mohit Sinha
- Bipasha Basu
- Sohail Khan
- Arbaz Khan

== Soundtrack ==
Welcome To New York

Soundtrack album by Sajid–Wajid, Shamir Tandon and Meet Bros
- Released: 16 February 2018
- Genre: Feature film soundtrack
- Length: 17:15
- Language: Hindi
- Label: Sony Music India

Sajid–Wajid chronology
Judwaa 2 (2017)	Welcome to New York (2018)	Nanu Ki Jaanu (2018)

Meet Bros chronology
Judwaa 2 (2017)	Welcome to New York (2018)	Race 3 (2018)

The music of the film is composed by Sajid–Wajid, Shamir Tandon and Meet Bros while lyrics have been penned by Kausar Munir, Kumaar, Charanjeet Charan, Sajid Khan and Danish Sabri.

Track listing
No.	Title	Lyrics	Music	Singer(s)	Length
1.	"Ishtehaar"	Charanjeet Charan	Shamir Tandon	Rahat Fateh Ali Khan, Dhvani Bhanushali	4:18
2.	"Nain Phisal Gaye"	Kausar Munir	Sajid–Wajid	Payal Dev	3:39
3.	"Pant Mein Gun"	Sajid Khan, Danish Sabri	Sajid–Wajid	Diljit Dosanjh, Sajid–Wajid	3:13
4.	"Meher Hai Rab Di"	Kumaar	Meet Bros	Mika Singh, Khushboo Grewal	3:07
5.	"Smiley Song"	Kumaar	Shamir Tandon	Boman Irani, Dhvani Bhanushali	2:58
Total length:					17:15

== Reception ==
=== Critical response ===
Rajeev Masand of News 18 severely criticized the film saying that, "Welcome to New York isn't merely a bad film, or even a terrible one. It's depressing. Not because the plot is all over the place (it is!), not because the actors appear to be doing whatever they like (they are!), and not because it has no vision or ambition (it doesn't!) – but because it's an exercise in sheer pointlessness. Really, this film has no reason to exist." and gave it a rating of 1 out of 5. Rohit Vats of Hindustan Times gave the film a rating of 0.5 out of 5 and concluded his review by saying that, "Welcome To New York is totally lost in New York, and looks nothing more than an extended IIFA trailer. It's not worth wasting your time, money, patience and intelligence on this mind-numbing promotional video.". Shubhra Gupta of The Indian Express gave the film a rating of 1 out of 5 and said that, "Welcome To New York turns out to be a limp, lame tribute to Bollywood".
