= Dhiraj Deshmukh =

Indian politician

Member of Maharashtra Legislative Assembly
- In office 27 November 2019 – 26 November 2024
- Preceded by: Trimbakrao Shrirangrao Bhise
- Succeeded by: Ramesh Karad
- Constituency: Latur Rural

General secretary of Maharashtra Pradesh Youth Congress
- Incumbent
- Assumed office 2021

Chairman of The Latur District Central Co-Op Bank Ltd
- Incumbent
- Assumed office 7 December 2021

Personal details
- Born: Dhiraj Vilasrao Deshmukh; 6 April 1980 (age 46) Latur, Maharashtra, India
- Party: Indian National Congress
- Spouse: Deepshikha Deshmukh
- Children: 2
- Parent(s): Vilasrao Deshmukh (father); Vaishali Deshmukh (mother)
- Relatives: See Deshmukh family
- Occupation: Politician

Dhiraj Vilasrao Deshmukh (born 6 April 1980) is an Indian politician and a former MLA of the Indian National Congress, representing the Latur Rural (Vidhan Sabha constituency) in the Maharashtra Legislative Assembly. He is the son of Vilasrao Deshmukh, former chief minister of Maharashtra.

He serves as the chairman of The Latur District Central Co-Op Bank Ltd. and as the general secretary of Maharashtra Pradesh Youth Congress.

== Early life and education ==
Dhiraj Deshmukh was born as the youngest son of Vilasrao Deshmukh. He completed his schooling in Latur and pursued higher education in Mumbai, where he developed a strong commitment to public service and the needs of rural communities, shaping his future career in politics.

== Political career ==
Dhiraj Deshmukh began his political career with a focus on youth and community welfare:

- 2014-2019: Served as President of the Youth Congress in Latur district, mobilizing and empowering young people.
- 2017-2019: Elected as a member of the Latur Zilla Parishad, focusing on local development initiatives.
- 2019-2024: Elected to the Maharashtra Legislative Assembly from the Latur Rural constituency, securing one of the largest victory margins.

In the November2024 Maharashtra Legislative Assembly election, Deshmukh lost his seat by 6,595 votes to BJP politician Ramesh Karad.

== Personal life ==
Dhiraj Deshmukh is married to Deepshikha Deshmukh, a film producer, and they have two children. Deshmukh's older brother Riteish Deshmukh is an actor, and elder brother Amit Deshmukh is a politician for Latur city.

== Positions held ==
- 2014: President, Youth Congress, Latur District
- 2017-2019: Member, Latur Zilla Parishad
- 2019-2024: Member, Maharashtra Legislative Assembly
- 2020: Member, Maharashtra State Wildlife Board
- 2020: Member, Marathi Language Committee of Maharashtra State Government
- 2020: Member, State Government Estimates Committee
- 2020: Member, State Government Private Hospital Inspection Committee (Charity funds)
- 2021: General Secretary, Maharashtra Pradesh Youth Congress
- 2021–Present: Chairman, The Latur District Central Co-Op Bank Ltd.

== See also ==
- Vilasrao Deshmukh
- Amit Deshmukh
