= Vashu Bhagnani =

Indian film producer

- Born: 19 April 1961 (age 65); Calcutta, West Bengal, India
- Occupations: Film Producer and Businessman
- Years active: 1983-Present
- Organization: Pooja Entertainment
- Known for: Coolie no.1
- Spouse: Pooja Bhagnani
- Children: Deepshikha Deshmukh (daughter); Jackky Bhagnani (son)

Vashu Bhagnani is an Indian film producer from Mumbai, India who works in the Bollywood film industry.

He launched Puja Entertainment India Ltd. in 1995 with the movie Coolie No. 1 His films include Coolie No. 1 (1995), Hero No. 1 (1997), Bade Miyan Chote Miyan (1998), Mujhe Kucch Kehna Hai (2001), Rehnaa Hai Terre Dil Mein (2001), Om Jai Jagadish (2002), Jeena Sirf Merre Liye (2002) and Shaadi No. 1 (2005). His recent ventures include Mission Raniganj (2023), Ganpath (2023), and Bade Miyan Chote Miyan (2024).

== Personal life ==
Vashu Bhagnani was born on 19 April 1961 in Calcutta, West Bengal, India. He is of Sindhi descent. He is the son of Lilaram Bhagnani and is married to Pooja Bhagnani, after whom he named his production company, Pooja Entertainment India Limited, founded in 1995.

Bhagnani's personal life has been marked by both struggles and successes. He had to quit school in the sixth standard due to financial difficulties and began selling clothes in various cities to earn a living. In 1989, he moved to Mumbai to start his own business, initially working in manufacturing TV parts and clothing before venturing into film production.

The Bhagnani family is deeply involved in the film industry. His son, Jackky Bhagnani, is an actor, film producer, and entrepreneur who has acted in several films produced by his father, while his daughter, Deepshikha Deshmukh, is also involved in the family's production business.

Vashu Bhagnani's career in film production has seen both highs and lows. After a string of successful "No. 1" movies in the late 1990s and early 2000s, he faced financial setbacks with the failure of Anupam Kher's directorial debut, Om Jai Jagadish in 2002, which led him to temporarily shift to real estate before making a comeback in film production.

== Production ==
Year	Title
1995	Coolie No. 1
1997	Hero No. 1
1998	Pyaar Kiya To Darna Kya
1998	Bade Miyan Chote Miyan
1999	Biwi No.1
2000	Tera Jadoo Chal Gayaa
2001	Mujhe Kucch Kehna Hai
2001	Rehnaa Hai Terre Dil Mein
2001	Deewaanapan
2002	Om Jai Jagadish
2002	Jeena Sirf Merre Liye
2003	Out of Control
2005	Vaada
2005	Silsiilay
2005	Antarmahal: Views of the Inner Chamber
2005	Shaadi No. 1
2008	Sorry Bhai!
2009	Kal Kissne Dekha
2009	Do Knot Disturb
2011	F.A.L.T.U
2012	Ajab Gazabb Love
2013	Himmatwala
2013	Rangrezz
2014	Humshakals
2014	Youngistaan
2015	Welcome 2 Karachi
2016	Sarbjit
2017	Carbon
2018	Dil Juunglee
2018	Welcome To New York
2021	Bell Bottom
2021	Shava Ni Girdhari Lal
2023	Mission Raniganj
2023	Ganapath
2024	Bade Miyan Chote Miyan
2025	Mere Husband Ki Biwi

== Distribution ==
Year	Title
2015	Kis Kisko Pyaar Karoon
2016	Junooniyat
2016	The Legend of Tarzan (Domestic Release Only)
2016	Madaari
2016	Star Trek Beyond (Domestic Release Only)
2016	Dishoom
2016	Freaky Ali
2016	Raaz: Reboot
2016	Banjo
2016	Tutak Tutak Tutiya (Hindi Release Only)
2017	Parmanu: The Story Of Pokhran
2018	Pari
2018	Fanney Khan
2018	Batti Gul Meter Chalu
2018	Kedarnath
2019	Mental Hai Kya
2019	Pati Patni Aur Woh
2020	Dostana 2
2021	Mr. Lele
2021	Gehraiyaan
2021	Kabhi Eid Kabhi Diwali
2021	Veere Di Wedding 2
2021	Raksha Bandhan
2021	Takht
2022	Mayday
2022	Jugjugg Jeeyo
2022	HIT: The First Case
2023	Selfiee
2023	Kabzaa (Hindi Release Only)
2023	Bull
2023	Adipurush (Hindi Release Only)
2023	OMG 2 (Overseas Release Only)
2024	Devara
2024	Mr. & Mrs. Mahi
2024	Sarfira (Overseas Release Only)
2024	Auron Mein Kahan Dum Tha (Overseas Release Only)
2024	Amaran (Hindi Release Only)
2024	Naam
