= Om Jai Jagadish =

2002 film by Anupam Kher

- Directed by: Anupam Kher
- Written by: Rumi Jaffery; Rahul Nanda
- Produced by: Vashu Bhagnani
- Starring: Waheeda Rahman; Anil Kapoor; Fardeen Khan; Abhishek Bachchan; Mahima Chaudhry; Urmila Matondkar; Tara Sharma
- Cinematography: Johny Lal
- Edited by: Apurva Asrani
- Music by: Songs: Anu Malik; Score: Ranjit Barot
- Production company: Pooja Entertainment
- Distributed by: Saregama (India); Eros International (Overseas)
- Release date: 19 July 2002
- Running time: 172 minutes
- Country: India
- Language: Hindi

Om Jai Jagadish is a 2002 Indian Hindi-language drama film directed by Anupam Kher in his directorial debut and produced by Vashu Bhagnani under Pooja Entertainment. The film stars Waheeda Rahman, Anil Kapoor, Fardeen Khan, Abhishek Bachchan, Mahima Chaudhry, Urmila Matondkar and Tara Sharma.

== Plot ==
Saraswati Batra is the widowed mother of Om, Jai, and Jagdish. They live at a beach home where they are often approached by investors seeking to buy their home, but Om always refuses no matter how generous the offer. Om is responsible and provides the income for the whole family. He works in a music company owned by his friend, Shekhar Malhotra. Jai is very ambitious (he wants to build the world's fastest car) and is studying in the United States. His education is paid for by Om, for which he has taken a loan from Shekhar Malhotra. Jagdish is a college student who is very good with computers. Jai soon returns home after Om and his mother convince him.

They all want different things. Om marries the bubbly Ayesha, an MTV VJ, and Jai marries Neetu, the daughter of a rich NRI. Jagdish is in love with Pooja, who is from Bangalore; they met at a college festival. When Jai, on the insistence of his wife Neetu, clashes with Om's values, they drift apart.

Jai moves back to the United States and starts working at a garage while experimenting with car engines. Jagdish is caught computer hacking after trying to help a friend get the answers to a test, and Om throws him out of the house as a result. Om realizes that Shekhar had lien over his house to secure his debt for Jai's study. When he fails to pay it back, Shekhar takes possession of the house. Om, Ayesha, and Sarawasti have to leave the house. All three brothers struggle to achieve their goals. Om starts his own music label, Jai finally succeeds in building the fastest car and Jagdish meets with a tech billionaire to propose a deal for anti-hacking software.

Shekhar puts their home for auction. Eventually, they all come together at the house auction to buy it back. Om is at the auction to see the winner and is surprised when Jagadish shows up to bid. He reveals that he used his hacking skills to create a program to block hackers instead. Jai comes at the end of the auction and bids more, which he got by selling his engine for the fastest car, and realizes that his future is in India, not in the United States. He doesn't have enough, so the three brothers combine their money to win back the house, but it isn't enough. Finally, it is revealed that the CEO of the company, who Jagdish made the hacking program for, bid for the house and won. Jagdish made a deal that the price of the house is the price of the program. The three brothers reunite and move back into the house.

== Cast ==
- Waheeda Rahman as Saraswati Satya Prakash Batra
- Anil Kapoor as Om Batra
- Fardeen Khan as Jai Batra
- Abhishek Bachchan as Jagdish "Jaggu" Batra
- Mahima Chaudhry as Shanti / Ayesha Batra
- Urmila Matondkar as Neetu Batra (née Saxena)
- Tara Sharma as Pooja Batra
- Parmeet Sethi as Shekhar Malhotra
- Annu Kapoor as KK
- Rakesh Bedi as Ram Prasad “RP”
- Raju Kher as Giri Saxena, Neetu's father
- Lillete Dubey as Rita Saxena, Neetu's mother
- Achint Kaur as Tanya Chopra, Shekhar fiancée
- Arun Bali as Anil Khanna, College Principal of Jagdish
- Shishir Sharma as Narayan Pillai, CEO of Softel Technology Ltd.
- Rajesh Khera as Rehman
- Tanishq as Arnav Batra, Om's son
- Chet Dixon as Bryan, Jai's friend
- Daisy Shah as background dancer in the song "Happy Days" (uncredited appearance)

== Production ==
=== Development ===
Originally, Yash Raj Films wanted to rope in director Anupam Kher with his script and also wished to produce it, on the condition that the director managed to rope in Aamir Khan (Om), Shah Rukh Khan (Jai), Salman Khan (Jagadish), Rani Mukerji (Ayesha), Kajol (Neetu) & Preity Zinta (Pooja) to play the leading characters. However, all the actors declined the film stating date problems and the project was eventually produced by Vashu Bhagnani and released by Saregama. Tabu was initially part of the film but walked out before its completion. This added to the film's pre-release challenges.

=== Filming ===
Some parts of the film were shot in Dunedin, New Zealand. The university campus shown in the film is the University of Otago.

== Music ==
Om Jai Jagadish

Soundtrack album by Anu Malik
- Released: 22 April 2002
- Genre: Feature film soundtrack
- Label: Saregama

The music was composed by Anu Malik, with lyrics written by Sameer.

No.	Title	Singer(s)	Length
1.	"Om Jai Jagadish"	Abhijeet; Alka Yagnik; Hariharan; Shaan
2.	"Chori Chori"	Alka Yagnik; Sonu Nigam; Kunal Ganjawala
3.	"Jeena Kya"	KK
4.	"Happy Days"	Alka Yagnik; Udit Narayan; Sonu Nigam; Roop Kumar Rathod
5.	"Shaadi"	Hema Sardesai; Shaan
6.	"Love Story"	Abhijeet, Shaan; Kavita Krishnamurthy
7.	"Pyar Ka Matlab"	Alka Yagnik; Kavita Krishnamurthy; Udit Narayan; Sonu Nigam; Kunal Ganjawala
