= Mohini (2018 film) =

2018 film by Ramana Madhesh

- Theatrical release poster
- Directed by: R. Madhesh
- Written by: R. Madhesh
- Produced by: S. Lakshman Kumar
- Starring: Trisha Krishnan; Jackky Bhagnani
- Cinematography: R. B. Gurudev
- Edited by: Dinesh Ponraj
- Music by: Vivek–Mervin (Songs); Aruldev (Background Score)
- Production companies: Prince Pictures; Marvel Worth Productions
- Distributed by: Eros International
- Release date: 27 July 2018
- Running time: 138 minutes
- Country: India
- Language: Tamil

Mohini is a 2018 Indian Tamil-language comedy horror film written and directed by R. Madhesh, starring Trisha Krishnan and Jackky Bhagnani. The film, which was predominantly shot in London, was shot between June 2016 and April 2017. It was released on 27 July 2018. Yogi Babu won the Tamil Nadu State Film Award for Best Comedy Actor.

== Plot ==
Vaishnavi is a popular YouTuber and chef living in Chennai, Tamil Nadu. Her friend Ambuja's fiancé Cotton is stuck in a situation that demands him to go to London to work as a chef, but he is unqualified and steals Vaishnavi's recipe to get a job. He asks Vaishnavi to accompany him to pose as an assistant and help him secure the job so that he can be financially stable. After Ambuja and Cotton's wedding, Vaishnavi agrees and travels to London with Cotton and a relative Balki. They stay with their friends Ganesh and his wife Madhu and work as chefs at a restaurant in the Park Grand Hotel in Hounslow. Vaishnavi meets Sandeep there, and they fall in love.

One day, on a boating trip in the River Thames, Madhu loses her bracelet but Vaishnavi finds it and a shankha comes along with it. Vaishnavi accidentally injures herself and washes off her blood in the water. This drop of blood triggers the vengeful spirit of a dead woman at the bottom of the river. She possesses Vaishnavi, who goes on a killing spree. Her friends experience numerous paranormal occurrences soon after and consult with a priest to find that Vaishnavi is possessed. The spirit turns out to be Mohini, a doppelgänger of Vaishnavi. Meanwhile, Sandeep proposes to Vaishnavi, and they get engaged in the presence of his family. They meet Sandeep's mother Menaka and his estranged father Vicky/KVR. Mohini is enraged upon seeing him, and this reminds her of why she was killed. When Vicky/KVR announced Sandeep as heir to his Property, Mohini decides to kill Vicky/KVR and his goons who had killed her.

Mohini was an architect working for a construction company owned by KVR in London. She found out about the child sacrifice rituals (narabali) that KVR believes in and goes on to rescue children from a child trafficking gang owned by KVR. KVR and the gang are arrested, but they get released because of KVR's political influence. KVR and his men then capture Mohini, kill her, and throw her body into the Thames. Now that she has found a doppelgänger in Vaishnavi, Mohini returns for revenge. She goes after Vicky/KVR and kills him, but not before telling that all of his generation will be killed by her, and that includes Sandeep. Menaka, KVR's wife, learns of this and tries to protect Sandeep from Mohini with the help of a Buddhist monk. She also contacts Mohini's mother, who agrees to help with the rituals that they are performing. The monk tells that in addition to the rituals, either Vaishnavi's body must be destroyed or a human sacrifice has to be done to appease Mohini.

Meanwhile, when Sandeep and Vaishnavi move into their new home, Vaishnavi sees a picture of Vicky/KVR whom Mohini had killed. This triggers Mohini's anger and tries to kill Sandeep and chases him into a church. Mohini taunts Sandeep that she will kill Vaishnavi. The monk calls Sandeep and tells him that there is a waterfall behind the church which makes the water holy. Sandeep tries to swim through the river to reach the monastery, where his mother, the priest, Cotton, Madhu, Ganesh and Balki are waiting, but Mohini cannot follow him through the river and can only run on dry land. When the two reach, They all prevent Mohini from attacking Sandeep and try to save Vaishnavi from dying in the process. Mohini's mother finds that because of her daughter's vengeance, two innocent lives will be lost. She realises that Mohini's spirit needs just one human life in order to be satisfied, so she kills herself and offers as a sacrifice to Mohini in front of the Goddess. Mohini's spirit is finally at peace and leaves Vaishnavi and Sandeep alone.

Later on, it is shown that Mohini's spirit still lives on and hunts down anyone who tries to cause harm to children, She possesses Neha, a child who was groped by the school bus driver.

== Cast ==
- Trisha Krishnan in a dual role as:
  - Mohini
  - Vaishnavi
- Jackky Bhagnani as Sandeep
- Mukesh Tiwari as Vicky (KVR)
- Yogi Babu as Cotton
- Poornima Bhagyaraj as Menaka
- Rama as Mohini's mother
- Sriranjani as Vaishnavi's mother
- Ganeshkar as Ganesh
- Jangiri Madhumitha as Madhu
- Swaminathan as Balki
- Suresh as Monk
- Gayatri Rema as Ambuja, Cotton's fiancé
- Matt Townsend as Police Officer
- Dilyana Bouklieva as Police Officer
- Ashwani Chopra as Restaurant owner
- Elena Valdameri as News Reporter
- Manasvi Kottachi as Neha (uncredited role)

== Production ==
Trisha Krishnan signed on to play the titular role in an untitled horror film in early May 2016 and announced that she would collaborate with director R. Madhesh for the first time. The title Mohini was unveiled later that month, and the film was announced as a production venture for Prince Pictures, with Dinesh Ponraj as the editor. Madhesh said in one interview that the script was initially written as male-centric, but later changed to female-centric as he felt "mass appeal is no longer restricted to just heroes" and decided on Trisha as the lead actress as he felt she had both talent and the physique required. However, in another interview, he said the script was always intended to be female-centric. Madhesh added that he cast Hindi actor Jackky Bhagnani, rather than a well-known South Indian actor, to avoid unrealistic over-expectations, and because Bhagnani had the look of a non-resident Indian as the plot required. Production began in London in June 2016 with scenes shot in areas including Leicester Square, Piccadilly Circus and Tower Bridge. The makers held a month-long schedule there. Overall filming wrapped by April 2017.

== Music ==
The soundtrack was released on 12 January 2018 through Think Music.

All music is composed by Vivek–Mervin.

Track listing
No.	Title	Lyrics	Singer(s)	Length
1.	"Hey"	Mohan Rajan; Balan Kashmir	Mervin Solomon; Balan Kashmir	4:02
2.	"Bomb Figure Baby"	Samuel Deepak; Switche	Benny Dayal; Sanjana; Switche	2:58
3.	"YouTube La Melam"	Vivek	Sanjana Kalmanje; Vivek Siva	3:49
4.	"Mohini's Rage"	Pa Vijay	Nithyasree Mahadevan; Prashanthi; Vignesh Natarajan	4:40
Total length:				15:29

== Release ==
Mohini was released on 27 July 2018. The Tamil Nadu theatrical rights were valued at ₹6 crore.

== Reception ==
Thinkal Menon wrote for The Times of India, "Mohini is another horror film that follows the tried-and-tested path. However, it falls short when it comes to the emotions and an engaging screenplay to hold the audiences' attention". Ashameera Aiyappan wrote for The Indian Express, "The entire script suffers from the disease of superficiality, apart from the fact that it is woefully outdated". Nithya Gnanapandithan of The New Indian Express wrote, "The story is a rehash of the old standard horror film plot [...] and it's all very predictable [...] There's very little that redeems this tremendous bore of a film". Priyanka Sundar of Hindustan Times also gave the film a negative review, criticising it's reliance on horror clichés such as jump scares and "shrieking violins", along with the visual effects and post-production output.
