= Ajab Gazabb Love =

2012 Indian film by Sanjay Gadhvi

- Theatrical release poster
- Directed by: Sanjay Gadhvi
- Written by: Mayur Puri
- Story by: G. Nageswara Reddy
- Produced by: Vashu Bhagnani
- Starring: Arjun Rampal; Jackky Bhagnani; Nidhi Subbaiah; Darshan Jariwala; Kirron Kher
- Cinematography: Chirantan Das
- Edited by: Amitabh Shukla
- Music by: Songs: Sajid–Wajid; Guest Composers: Sachin–Jigar; Background Score: Sandeep Shirodkar
- Production company: Pooja Entertainment
- Distributed by: Sony Pictures Networks India
- Release date: 25 October 2012
- Country: India
- Language: Hindi

Ajab Gazabb Love (transl. Strange and amazing love) is a 2012 Indian Hindi-language romantic comedy film directed by Sanjay Gadhvi and produced by Vashu Bhagnani. The film stars Arjun Rampal in a double role, along with Jackky Bhagnani opposite Nidhi Subbaiah in lead roles and Darshan Jariwala and Kirron Kher in supporting roles, whilst Arshad Warsi appears in a cameo role. The screenplay and dialogues were written by Mayur Puri. The theatrical trailer of the film revealed on 13 August 2012, whilst the film released worldwide on 25 October 2012, and received mostly negative response. The storyline is remade from the Telugu film Seema Tapakai.

== Plot ==
The story revolves around Rajveer, a hard-working, rich youngster who is the heir of his father, Yashvardhan Grewal, and his company, Grewal Motors Co. When Rajveer falls in love with Madhuri, he realises that she hates all rich people, and has much sympathy for poor families. Therefore, Rajveer starts a drama, in which he pretends to be poor along with his family to gain Madhuri's love. However, when Madhuri's elder brother Karan Singh Chauhan, arrives to meet Rajveer's family, he begins to suspect him, and the truth begins to come out.

== Cast ==
- Jackky Bhagnani as Rajveer Grewal
- Nidhi Subbaiah as Madhuri “Maddy” Singh Chauhan
- Kirron Kher as Rashmi Grewal Rajveer's Mom
- Darshan Jariwala as Yashvardhan Grewal Rajveer's Dad
- Arjun Rampal as Karan Singh Chauhan / Arjun Singh Chauhan (dual role)
- Arshad Warsi as Subramanium Seth (Subhu)
- Anuja Sachdeva as Switty Grewal
- Prageet Pandit as Adarsh Grewal
- Mayur Puri as T2
- Vikas Shrivastav as Mhatre

== Production ==
The film is a remake of Seema Tapakai, a Telugu film starring Allari Naresh and Shamna Kasim.

== Soundtrack ==
Ajab Gazabb Love

Soundtrack album by Sajid–Wajid Sachin–Jigar
- Genre: Film soundtrack
- Label: Sony Music India
- Producers: Sajid–Wajid; Sachin–Jigar

The songs were composed by Sajid–Wajid, with lyrics penned by Priya Panchal and Kausar Munir. The songs were sung by Mika Singh, Mohit Chauhan and Antara Mitra amongst others. Punjabi track "Nachde Punjabi" by Dalvinder Singh and Tarli Digital, which was released in the early 20s, was remade for the film by Sachin–Jigar.

The film score is composed by Sandeep Shirodkar.

Track #	Song	Length	Singer(s)	Comments
1	"Boom Boom" (Lip Lock)	4:36	Mika Singh	
2	"Tu Hi"	4:24	Mohit Chauhan	
3	"Sun Soniye"	4:32	Mohammad Irfan Ali and Antara Mitra	
4	"Nachde Punjabi"	4:00	Mika Singh, Yo Yo Honey Singh, Priya Panchal	
5	"Boom Boom" (Remix)	4:00	Mika Singh	
6	"Sun Soniye" (Remix)	3:53	Mohammad Irfan Ali & Antara Mitra	
7	"Ajab Gazabb Love"	3:14	Mika Singh	Composed by Sachin–Jigar

== Critical reception ==
Professional reviews
Review Scores
Source	Rating
Daily News and Analysis	1.5/5 stars
The Times of India	2.5/5 stars
Bollywood Hungama	3/5 stars
Rediff.com	2/5 stars

Ajab Gazabb Love received average to negative reviews from film critics upon its release. Madhureeta Mukherjee of Times of India gave it 2.5/5 stars. "This film is all about a bunch of people going bananas, yet, it doesn't leave you in splits. But if you care for a few giggles, go watch it.!!!" said ToI. Rediff Movies said "Ajab Gazabb Love is reminiscent of the bad films of the bad 1990s" and gave it 2 stars. Taran Adarsh of Bollywood Hungama gave it 3 stars. Kanika Sikka of DNA gave it 1.5 stars.

== Box office ==
Ajab Gazabb Love had collected ₹67.6 million (US$700,000) in its first week.
