= Sanjay Kenekar =

Indian politician

Member of Maharashtra Legislative Council
- Incumbent
- Assumed office 20 March 2025
- Preceded by: Ramesh Karad
- Constituency: elected by the Members of Legislative Assembly

Personal details
- Born: Sanjay Kisanrao Kenekar; July 17, 1970 (age 55) At.Khokadpura, Aurangabad District
- Party: Bharatiya Janata Party (1998–present)
- Spouse: Vaishali Kenekar
- Parent(s): Kisanrao Kenekar (Father); Kokilabai Kenekar (Mother)

Sanjay Kisanrao Kenekar is a politician and OBC face of the BJP from Sambhajinagar district. He is active member of the Bhartiya Janta Party. In 2025, he was elected as a member of the Maharashtra Legislative Council.

== Political career ==
- In BJP he has a 35-year political journey from 1998 to 2024.
- Initially, he started his political journey and worked as an activist in the Akhil Bharatiya Vidyarthi Parishad (ABVP) in 1988. After that, he worked in BJP organisation for 12 years, from the ward president to state president of the Bharatiya Janata Yuva Morcha.
- He has also held the post of BJP city president.
- He was elected to the Chhatrapati Sambhajinagar Municipal Corporation and worked as a corporator for 15 years.
- He served as Deputy Mayor of Chhatrapati Sambhajinagar Municipal Corporation at the age of 23.
- Union Minister Nitin Gadkari founded the Bharatiya Janata Party's Kamgar Aghadi in 2008. He served as the state general secretary from 2008 to 2010.
- 2013 - President, BJP Labor Morcha, Maharashtra from 2013-2015
- He worked as the state president of the Bharatiya Janata Party's Workers' Alliance for 6 years.
- He was appointed the Chairman of MHADA by the Government of Maharashtra on July 13, 2019.
- 2022 -He has also held the post of BJP City president and BJP General Secretary, Maharashtra in 2022.
- 2025 - Member of the Maharashtra Legislative council, Maharashtra
