= Carbon: The Story of Tomorrow =

Carbon: A Story of Tomorrow
- Release poster
- Directed by: Maitrey Bajpai; Ramiz Ilham Khan
- Screenplay by: Maitrey Bajpai; Ramiz Ilham Khan
- Story by: Maitrey Bajpai; Ramiz Ilham Khan
- Produced by: Jackky Bhagnani; Deepshikha Deshmukh; Gautam Gupta
- Starring: Jackky Bhagnani; Nawazuddin Siddiqui; Prachi Desai
- Cinematography: Pooja Gupte
- Edited by: Shakti Hasija; Abhishek Seth
- Music by: Salim–Sulaiman
- Production companies: Pooja Entertainment; Futureworks; Exceed Entertainment
- Distributed by: Royal Stag Large Short Films
- Release date: 21 August 2017
- Running time: 25 minutes
- Country: India

Carbon is a 2017 Indian Hindi-language science fiction short film based on global warming. It is written and directed by Maitrey Bajpai and Ramiz Ilham Khan, and film stars Jackky Bhagnani, Nawazuddin Siddiqui and Prachi Desai. The film is set in 2067, in an Earth where carbon is in abundance, and oxygen is supplied by industries. Bhagnani plays a man with an artificial heart and Siddiqui plays the role of a man from Mars and Desai plays a robot. The film was released on the YouTube channel of Large Short Films.

== Plot ==
Set in 2067, 'Carbon' focuses on the prevailing environmental issues in Delhi. The film showcases scarcity of oxygen and water and its adverse effects on the environment and the forthcoming generations. This futuristic film portrays a scenario where there will be a dearth of oxygen and only carbon will prevail.

== Cast ==
- Jackky Bhagnani as Random Shukla
- Prachi Desai as Pari
- Yashpal Sharma as Yakub
- Nawazuddin Siddiqui as a contract killer based in Mars (imposter Mr. Shah)
- Shashi Bhushan as Shashi

== Reception ==
The film received media attention after the release of its trailer.

When the film released it got positive responses for the concept from the critics. Actor Sushant Singh Rajput praises the film by saying, "Generally, we talk about cause after the effect has taken place, but there are very few instances where we talk about effect before cause. 'Carbon' is a very well-intentioned film and a required film at this point of time. It talks about an immediate issue, so I want to congratulate Jackky for that. I have seen the trailer and I really liked it. I feel the concept of the film is really good, and puts a question mark on the whole system." Hindustan Times said, "The short film plays up the current socio-political equations and sets them in a world almost 50 years from now. The divide between rich and poor, human greed and spiralling environmental crisis are all well-placed in the narrative." The Indian Express give a mixed review by saying, "...Meanwhile, Nawazuddin, a contract killer, poses as an NRI from Mars. The plot may sound interesting, but sadly the unrelatable characters and dull dialogue delivery play spoilsport. Even if the first 15 minutes are bearable and support the plotline, it still is a failed attempt." In the film director show people needed 100% pure oxygen but they didn't know pure oxygen is generally bad, and sometimes toxic.
