= Trimbakrao Shrirangrao Bhise =

Indian politician

Member of the Maharashtra Legislative Assembly
- In office 2014–2019
- Preceded by: Vaijnath Shinde
- Succeeded by: Dhiraj Deshmukh
- Constituency: Latur Rural

Personal details
- Born: Bhokramba, Renapur, Latur, Maharashtra, India
- Citizenship: India
- Party: Indian National Congress
- Parent: Shrirangrao Bhise (father)
- Occupation: Politician
- Profession: Advocate and social worker

Shri Trimbak Shrirangrao Bhise is an Indian politician from Maharashtra. He is a one-term Member of the Maharashtra Legislative Assembly.

== Political career ==
Shri Trimbak Shrirangrao Bhise was elected as the member for Latur Rural in Maharashtra from 2014 to 2019. Shri Bhise is a member of the Indian National Congress.
