= Latur Taluka =

Human settlement in Maharashtra, India

Latur Taluka is an administrative subdivision (taluka) of Latur District in Maharashtra, India.

Latur Taluka is in the western part of Latur District, with Renapur Taluka to the north, Chakur Taluka and Shirur Anantpal Taluka to the east, Ausa Taluka to the south, Osmanabad District to the southwest and west, and Beed District to the northwest. The main river in the taluka is the Manjara River, together with its tributary the Tawarja, which originates near Murud.

In the 2011 census, there were 109 panchayat villages in Latur Taluka. Latur City and Latur Rural constituencies of the Maharashtra Legislative Assembly (Vidhan Sabha) are located in Latur Taluka. The Latur Rural Constituency also covers other talukas.

== Points of interest in taluka ==
In the village of Mahapur, about 8 km from the town of Latur, there is the Ashram of Namanand Maharaj. Also next to Mahapur is a small island in the Manjara River with an ancient temple of Dattatreya.

== See also ==
- Tourism in Marathwada
