= Vaijnath Shinde =

Indian politician

Member of the Maharashtra Legislative Assembly
- In office 2009–2014
- Preceded by: Constituency created
- Succeeded by: Trimbakrao Shrirangrao Bhise
- Constituency: Latur Rural

Personal details
- Born: 30 June 1969 (age 56) Dhoki (yeli), latur, Maharashtra, India
- Citizenship: India
- Party: Indian National Congress

Vaijanath Gyandev Shinde is an Indian politician from the Indian National Congress and who is currently a Member of Legislative Assembly (MLA) in the Maharashtra. In 2009, he contested election from the Latur Rural and defeated Ramesh Karad of Bharatiya Janata Party & Independent Dilip Nade by over 23583 votes.
