= Jackky Bhagnani =

Indian actor, film producer and entrepreneur (born 1984)

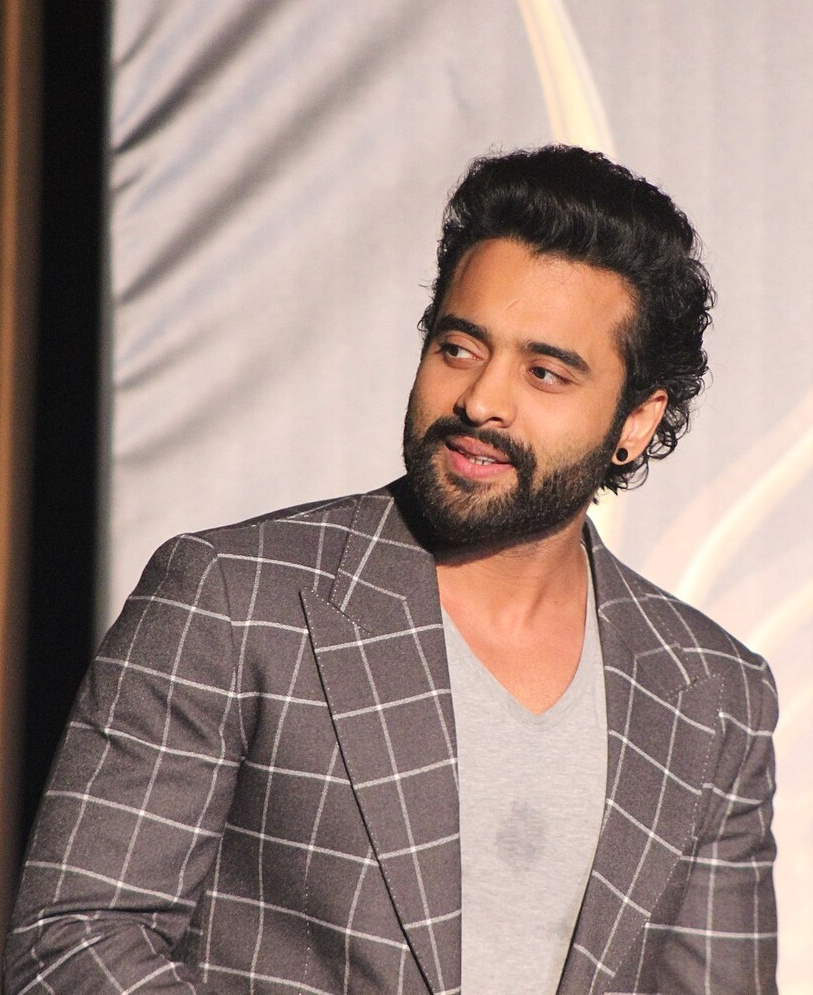
- Bhagnani at IIFA press conference in 2017
- Born: 25 December 1984 (age 41); Calcutta, West Bengal, India
- Occupations: Actor; film producer; entrepreneur
- Years active: 2009–present
- Spouse: Rakul Preet Singh (m. 2024)
- Father: Vashu Bhagnani
- Relatives: Deepshikha Deshmukh (sister)

Jackky Bhagnani (born 25 December 1984) is an Indian actor, film producer and entrepreneur who works in Hindi cinema. He is the son of producer Vashu Bhagnani and founder of the Indian music label Jjust Music.

== Early life ==
Jackky Bhagnani was born in Calcutta, West Bengal to a Sindhi family. He is the son of producer Vashu Bhagnani and Pooja Bhagnani. After completing his schooling, he graduated with a Bachelors in Humanities from the H.R. College of Commerce and Economics, Mumbai. He had also completed an acting course from Lee Strasberg Theatre and Film Institute.

== Career ==
Bhagnani's debut film was Kal Kissne Dekha, which released in 2009. The movie received mostly negative reviews and was unsuccessful at the box office. Taran Adarsh, of Bollywood Hungama, wrote that "The film lacks the fun that one normally associates with a campus fare. Even the climax leaves a lot to be desired."

In April 2011, he starred in F.A.L.T.U. The film received mixed reviews and was a moderate well at the box office. In May 2015, Bhagnani revealed that a sequel to the movie has been planned.

In 2012, his third film Ajab Gazabb Love was released, but was unsuccessful at the box office.

In 2014, he starred in Rangrezz, directed by Priyadarshan. It received positive reviews from critics and featured Bhagnani dancing to Psy's "Gangnam Style". The rights to the song were bought by Bhagnani's father Vashu Bhagnani, also the producer of the film, for an undisclosed sum. Despite this, the film failed at the box office.

Bhagnani's next film was Youngistaan, a love story set against the backdrop of Indian politics. Released in 2014, the film was panned by critics and was a commercial failure.

The film later became the subject of much controversy when it was revealed that it was India's independent entry to the Oscars. Twitter was abuzz with jokes on Bhagnani, with users expressing surprise and dismay over the movie's selection.

In 2015, Bhagnani starred as Kedar Patel in the comedy film Welcome to Karachi, which was released on 28 May 2015. In 2016, he produced Sarbjit along with his sister Deepshikha Deshmukh under the banner Pooja Entertainment. In 2017, he produced and acted in the short film 'Carbon' which was released on YouTube. In 2018, he produced the films Dil Juunglee and Welcome to New York. In the same year, he made his Tamil film debut opposite Trisha in the horror film Mohini.

== Personal life ==
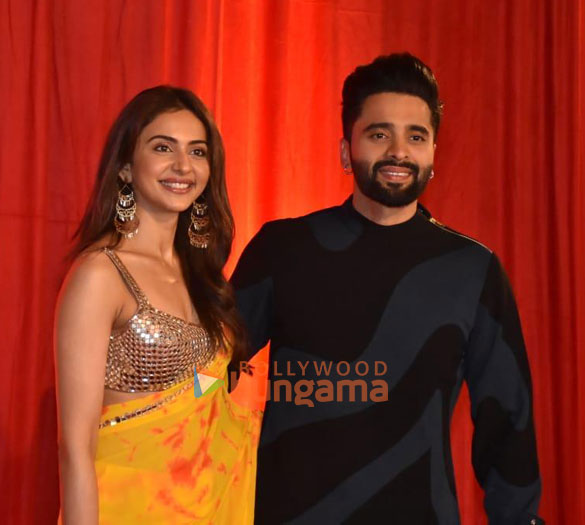
Bhagnani with wife Rakul Preet Singh, pictured in 2022

In 2021, Bhagnani announced his relationship with actress Rakul Preet Singh. On 21 February 2024, Bhagnani married Singh in traditional Sindhi and Sikh wedding ceremonies in Goa.

== Filmography ==
=== As actor ===
Key
†	Denotes films that have not yet been released

Year	Title	Role	Notes
2001	Rehnaa Hai Terre Dil Mein	Bouquet delivery man	Uncredited role
2009	Kal Kissne Dekha	Nihal Singh	First film
2011	F.A.L.T.U	Ritesh Virani	
2012	Ajab Gazabb Love	Rajveer Grewal	
2013	Rangrezz	Rishi Deshpande	
2014	Youngistaan	Prime Minister Abhimanyu Kaul	
2015	Welcome 2 Karachi	Kedar Patel	
2017	Carbon	Random Shukla	Short film
2018	Mohini	Sandeep	Tamil film
2018	Mitron	Jay	Final film

=== As producer ===
Year	Title	Notes	Ref.
2016	Sarbjit		
2018	Dil Juunglee		
2018	Welcome to New York		
2020	Jawaani Jaaneman		
2020	Coolie No. 1		
2021	Bell Bottom		
2022	Cuttputlli	Disney+ Hotstar film	
2023	Mission Raniganj		
2023	Ganapath		
2024	Bade Miyan Chote Miyan		
TBA	Suryaputra Mahavir Karna †	Based on Karna	
TBA	Mission Lion †		

=== Music video appearances ===
Year	Title	Singer(s)	Notes
2019	"Choodiyan"	Dev Negi and Asees Kaur	
2019	"Aa Jaana"	Darshan Raval and Prakriti Kakar	
2020	"Jugni 2.0"	Kanika Kapoor ft. Gurpreet Singh	Producer

== Awards and nominations ==
Year	Film	Award	Category	Outcome
2010	Kal Kissne Dekha	IIFA Award	Star Debut of the Year – Male	Won
2010	Kal Kissne Dekha	Apsara Awards	Best Debut (Male)	Won
2010	Kal Kissne Dekha	Star Guild Awards	Best Male Debut	Won
2012	F.A.L.T.U	Star Guild Awards	Superstar Of Tomorrow - Male	Won
2014	Youngistaan	BIG Star Entertainment Awards	BIG Star Most Entertaining Actor in a Social Role - Male	Won
