= Latur Rural Assembly constituency =

Constituency of the Maharashtra legislative assembly in India

Coordinates: 18.35°N 76.54°E

Latur Rural
- Constituency No. 234 for the Maharashtra Legislative Assembly

Constituency details
- Country: India
- Region: Western India
- State: Maharashtra
- Lok Sabha constituency: Latur
- Established: 2008
- Total electors: 334,957

Member of Legislative Assembly
- 15th Maharashtra Legislative Assembly
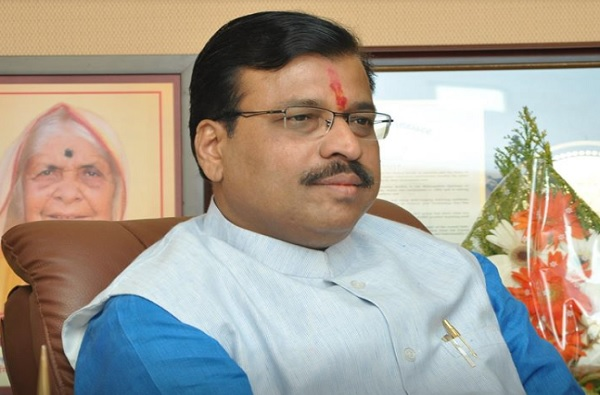
- Incumbent Ramesh Karad
- Party: BJP
- Elected year: 2024

Latur Rural Assembly constituency is one of the Assembly constituency in the Latur.

After the delimitation commission report, the Latur Assembly Constituency was divided in 2008 into Latur City and Latur Rural. They are part of Latur (Lok Sabha constituency).

== Geographical Scope ==
Village list : Pangaon, Sindhgaon, Andalgaon, Bawchi, Kolgaon, Sangvi Renapur, Bhokrambha, Shera, Poharegaon, Nivada, Harwadi, Murud, Kharola, Shelu, Javalga, Bitargaon, Samsapur, Bheta, Bhopala, Ekurga, Bodka, Ramwadi, Ghansargaon, Murdav, Takalgaon, Motegaon, Kamkheda. Borgaon(N.) Borgaon (Kale), Gondegoan, Ramegaon, Hissori, Chincholi(Ballalnath), Katgaon, shiur, Niwali, Shirala, Gadwad, Bhisewagholi, Khandala, Ekurga, Murud Akola, Sarsa, Wanjarkheda, Kasarkheda, Kasargaon, Selu Bk., Shivani Kh., Dhanegaon, Bori, Pimpri Amba, Jawla, Jod-Jawala, Gategaon, Manjri, Samangaon, Harnagul (Khurd), Harangul (Budruk), Sai, Mahapur, Mathephal, Khutephal, Wakdi, Pimpalgoan, Tandulja, WadeWagholi, Bhosa, Nilkanth, Chikurda, Bhoira, Wangdari,

== Members of Assembly ==
Year	Member	Party
Before 2009 : See Latur
2009	Vaijnath Shinde	Indian National Congress
2014	Trimbakrao Bhise	Indian National Congress
2019	Dhiraj Deshmukh	Indian National Congress
2024	Ramesh Karad	Bharatiya Janata Party

== Election results ==
=== Assembly Election 2024 ===
2024 Maharashtra Legislative Assembly election : Latur Rural
Party	Candidate	Votes	%	±%
BJP	Ramesh Karad	112,051	47.69%	New
INC	Dhiraj Deshmukh	105,456	44.88%	▼33.57
VBA	Dr. Ajanikar Vijay Raghunathrao	8,824	3.76%	▼3.78
MNS	Santosh Ganpatrao Nagargoje	3,768	1.60%	▼0.09
NOTA	None of the Above	483	0.21%	▼15.77
Margin of victory		6,595	2.81%	▼59.66
Turnout		235,450	70.29%	▲16.76
Total valid votes		234,967		
Registered electors		334,957		▲3.92
BJP gain from INC		Swing	▼30.76	

=== Assembly Election 2019 ===
2019 Maharashtra Legislative Assembly election : Latur Rural
Party	Candidate	Votes	%	±%
INC	Dhiraj Deshmukh	135,006	78.45%	▲29.14
NOTA	None of the Above	27,500	15.98%	▲15.57
SS	Sachin Alias Ravi Ramraje Deshmukh	13,524	7.86%	▲6.35
VBA	Done Manchakrao Baliram	12,966	7.53%	New
MNS	Arjun Dhondiram Waghamare	2,912	1.69%	▲0.33
Independent	Babruwan Baliram Pawar	1,496	0.87%	New
Margin of victory		107,506	62.47%	▲57.33
Turnout		199,601	61.92%	▼16.19
Total valid votes		172,099		
Registered electors		322,330		▲9.59
INC hold		Swing	▲29.14	

=== Assembly Election 2014 ===
2014 Maharashtra Legislative Assembly election : Latur Rural
Party	Candidate	Votes	%	±%
INC	Trimbakrao Shrirangrao Bhise	100,897	49.30%	▲3.11
BJP	Ramesh Karad	90,387	44.17%	▲10.62
SS	Haribhau Namdeo Sabde	3,085	1.51%	New
MNS	Santosh Ganpatrao Nagargoje	2,785	1.36%	▼0.10
NCP	Ashabai Shivaji Bhise	2,672	1.31%	New
BSP	Pro. Venkatesh Govindrao Kasbe	2,158	1.05%	▼0.21
NOTA	None of the Above	832	0.41%	New
Margin of victory		10,510	5.14%	▼7.51
Turnout		205,513	69.87%	▼1.17
Total valid votes		204,649		
Registered electors		294,116		▲11.60
INC hold		Swing	▲3.11	

=== Assembly Election 2009 ===
2009 Maharashtra Legislative Assembly election : Latur Rural
Party	Candidate	Votes	%	±%
INC	Vaijnath Shinde	86,136	46.19%	New
BJP	Ramesh Karad	62,553	33.55%	New
Independent	Dilipdada Namdevrao Nade	19,620	10.52%	New
Independent	Deshmukh Nathsinha Kishanrao	5,539	2.97%	New
MNS	Santosh Ganpatrao Nagargoje	2,718	1.46%	New
BSP	Adv. Laxman Narhari Shinde	2,355	1.26%	New
PWPI	Prof. S.V. Jadhav	1,780	0.95%	New
Margin of victory		23,583	12.65%	
Turnout		186,479	70.76%	
Total valid votes		186,466		
Registered electors		263,552		
INC win (new seat)				
