= Once Upon ay Time in Mumbai Dobaara! =

2013 Indian film by Milan Luthria

Once Upon a Time in Mumbai Dobaara!
- Theatrical release poster
- Directed by: Milan Luthria
- Written by: Rajat Arora
- Produced by: Ekta Kapoor; Shobha Kapoor
- Starring: Akshay Kumar; Imran Khan; Sonakshi Sinha; Sonali Bendre
- Cinematography: Ayananka Bose
- Edited by: Akiv Ali
- Music by: Songs: Pritam; Anupam Amod; Laxmikant–Pyarelal; Background Score: Sandeep Shirodkar
- Distributed by: Balaji Motion Pictures
- Release date: 15 August 2013
- Running time: 152 minutes
- Country: India
- Language: Hindi
- Budget: ₹85 crore
- Box office: ₹91.7 crore

Once Upon a Time in Mumbai Dobaara! (transl. Once Upon a time in Mumbai again; Hindi pronunciation: [doːbaːra]) is a 2013 Indian Hindi-language gangster film directed by Milan Luthria and produced by Ekta Kapoor and Shobha Kapoor. A sequel to 2010's Once Upon a Time in Mumbaai, the film stars Akshay Kumar, Imran Khan and Sonakshi Sinha, with Sonali Bendre in a special appearance. The film's title is an intentional misspelling of "Once Upon a time in Mumbai Dobaara", done in accordance with Ekta's belief in numerology and astrology.

Filming began on 27 August 2012 in Mumbai, with filming moving to Oman in September, becoming the first major Indian production filmed in the sultanate. Footage was shot on the beach in Qantab, Qurum, and at the Shangri-La's Barr Al Jissah Resort & Spa in Muscat. The film's visual effects (VFX) were by Reliance MediaWorks, and a team of 40 artists augmented 600 digital shots in one month. The live action sequences were filmed with RED and Arri's Alexa digital motion-picture camera. Once Upon a Time in Mumbai Dobaara! was well-promoted, and the film's second trailer was shown on prime-time slots on four television channels. Hollywood actor Al Pacino was shown the theatrical trailer for the film.

The film was released worldwide on 15 August 2013, on the eve of Independence Day in India. This was later scheduled to avoid clashing with Shah Rukh Khan's Chennai Express, which was released on 9 August. Once Upon a Time in Mumbai Dobaara! received mixed to negative reviews from critics, and became a box-office failure, grossing ₹91.7 crore against a budget of ₹85 crore.

== Plot ==
The film begins where its predecessor ended, with reigning don Shoaib Khan earning respect after his mentor, Sultan Mirza handed over his power to Shoaib in 1975, only to be assassinated by him as revenge for a public humiliation immediately after.

Twelve years later, in 1987, Khan is still a charismatic, suave womaniser, who has extended his empire to the Middle East. His only friends are Javed (who oversees his illegal work), his former love Mumtaz, and Aslam, a teenager Khan met during a visit to the slums in which he grew up.

An older Khan returns to Bombay to kill Rawal, who opposed his ambition to take the reins in Bombay. Although the city was his first love, rising starlet Jasmine wins his heart. Khan advances Jasmine's career by rigging awards, and showers her with gifts; he becomes obsessed with her. He sends Aslam and another trustworthy aide, Jimmy, to kill Rawal. Jimmy fails, accidentally killing his girlfriend, Mona, and flees. He is soon captured by the police, hot on Khan's trail after learning about his arrival in Bombay. Jimmy, loyal to Khan, does not crack during his interrogation and is freed due to lack of evidence. The police intend to draw Khan out from hiding; he has eluded them for twelve years, and this is their last chance to take him on Indian soil.

Khan, suspicious that Jimmy has become a police informer, decides to kill him but Aslam offers to do the deed to deflect police attention. He, Dedh Tang and several thugs masquerade as rival biker gangs and stage a brawl. Plain-clothes police officers try to control the chaos when Aslam corners Jimmy. When a police officer stops Aslam, Khan appears out of nowhere, murders Jimmy and injures the policeman. A chase ensues; the police fail to catch the two, who escape in Khan's Mercedes.

Although Khan has bought Jasmine a house, she rejects his advances, saying that she has never seen him as being more than a friend. Angry and disappointed, Khan slaps her and tells her to leave. He angrily destroys the set of the film she is cast in, leaving with her a twenty-four-hour deadline to accept his proposal. Jasmine returns home to see that Khan has filled her house with expensive presents. Her mother is taken aback when Jasmine explains that Khan is a gangster with whom she'd prefer not to associate. Her family questions the sense in rejecting a man as powerful and dangerous as Khan.

Aslam arrives at the address Khan has given him and, much to his shock, sees Jasmine walking towards his car. Initially angry that he is still following her, the two realise that they have been caught up in a complicated affair – that Aslam, unbeknownst to Jasmine, works for Khan, and that Jasmine was the one he had been sent to pick up. Before either can speak, a car containing Rawal and his henchmen arrives at a distance. Rawal shoots Jasmine, having learned of her relationship with Khan and hoping that hurting her lure the gangster into a vulnerable position.

Jasmine remains unconscious at the hospital as Khan arrives. He accuses Aslam of being in love with his fiancée – an accusation which Aslam denies as Khan reveals in an attempt to pacify Aslam that he has masterminded a plan to murder Rawal and ensure his own dominance over the Mumbai underworld. Khan intends to fabricate a story of him feuding with Aslam to tempt Rawal and his rivals into contacting Aslam. The "news" reaches Rawal, who seems delighted at the prospect of being able to turn Khan's right-hand man against him.

When Rawal calls Aslam at the hospital, Aslam, now fully aware of Khan's feelings towards Jasmine, seems unsure whether to abide by Khan's plan. He reluctantly provides Rawal with an address, ending the phone call by telling him to "murder the bastard". Khan, lying in wait outside the address with a sniper rifle, kills Rawal and his henchmen when they arrive. Khan, having consolidated power, savours his victory and walks into a police station undeterred as a taunt to law enforcement. However, Dedh Tang accidentally reveals Aslam's feelings for Jasmine in the midst of celebration. Khan, infuriated, diverts the car to the hospital to confront Aslam, who has continued to stay with Jasmine as she recovers from being shot by Rawal. Knowing that his friend is in danger, Dedh Tang honks the horn of the car repeatedly after Shoaib and his henchmen enter the building, alerting Aslam to the danger and giving him time to escape. Entering to see an empty bed where Jasmine had before been laying, Khan realises that Dedh Tang had given him away.

Khan sends his aide Akbar to kill Aslam after he and Jasmine flee to Aslam's uncle's restaurant in Dongri. Aslam assures Jasmine that Khan, though violent, would never hurt him. Their conversation is interrupted by a car's horn honking – running outside, Aslam is ambushed by Akbar after discovering the body of Dedh Tang, who has been killed by Shoaib for aiding the couple in their escape. Aslam, though injured and initially losing the fight, kills Akbar with a shovel. He calls Khan to tell him that the murder of Dedh Tang has, in effect, erased his deep-seated loyalty to his former boss. Khan responds by telling Aslam that sending Akbar was a mistake, as he must be the one to kill the man he views as also having betrayed him by "stealing" Jasmine.

Aslam and Khan confront one another as the police, having been alerted to Khan's location by a storekeeper, descend upon Dongri. Shoaib rains down blows and insults upon Aslam, urging him to defend himself in front of Jasmine. Nevertheless, Aslam, who still feels indebted and bound to Khan, does not fight back until Inspector Sawant appears through the gathered crowd – even then, Aslam only pushes Khan away so that Khan is not shot by the officer. Reacting quickly, Khan draws a pistol of his own and shoots Sawant before turning his weapon on Jasmine and Aslam. Jasmine, through tears and while holding a bleeding Aslam, tells Khan that he is truly evil and will never have her love. Khan seems to recognise the truth in her words as he drops his weapon and stares at the couple. Just then, more police officers arrive on the scene and open fire on Khan, who, now injured, is dragged away by Javed. He and Aslam, both alive but bloodied, lock eyes and reach out for another, having finally put aside their differences.

In the last scene, a bullet-ridden, dejected Khan reads a letter in Urdu he was unable to give Jasmine in the cargo hold of a ship leaving the city forever.

== Cast ==
- Akshay Kumar as Shoaib Khan, the main antagonist (based on Dawood Ibrahim)
- Imran Khan as Aslam Siddiqui, the main protagonist
- Sonakshi Sinha as Jasmine Sheikh (based on Mandakini)
- Sonali Bendre as Mumtaz
- Mahesh Manjrekar as Rawal, Shoaib's rival
- Akash Khurana as DK
- Sophie Choudry as Ayesha Dixit
- Mushtaq Khan as Chilliya
- Vidya Malvade as Mona, Rawal's girlfriend
- Abhimanyu Singh as ACP Ashish Sawant
- Sarfaraz Khan as Javed
- Chetan Hansraj as Jimmy
- Tiku Talsania as Tayyab Ali
- Pitobash Tripathy as Dedh Taang
- Mangala Kenkre as Jasmine's mother
- Deepraj Rana as Trilok
- Kurush Deboo as Stylo tailor manager
- Pawan Chopra as Commentator
- Nazea Hasan Sayed as Jasmine's sister
- Ajay Devgn as Sultan Mirza (archive footage)
- Vidya Balan as Salma (cameo appearance)
- Amanda Rosario as dancer in an item number "Tu Hi Khwahish"
- Hazel Crowney as dancer in an item number "Tu Hi Khwahish"

== Production ==
=== Filming ===
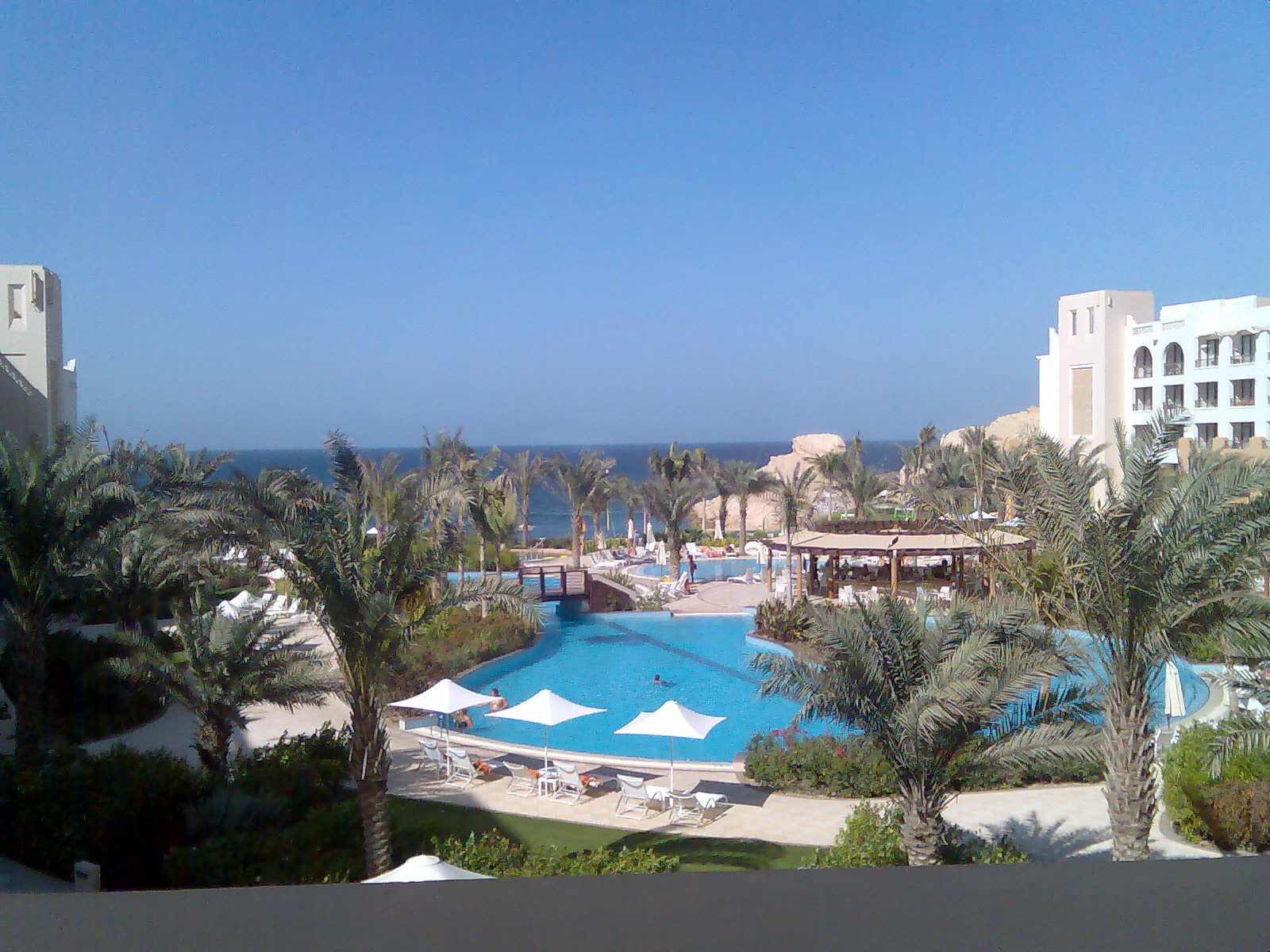
The Shangri-La hotel where most of the Oman portion of the film was shot.

Tanuj Garg, CEO of Balaji Motion Pictures, announced on Twitter that principal photography began on 27 August 2012 in Mumbai. Female lead Sonakshi Sinha joined the cast and crew two days later after completing her previous film, Son of Sardaar, with Ajay Devgn. The overseas shooting schedule began in September in Oman, the first major Indian production filmed in the sultanate. Portions of the film were shot on a beach in Qantab, on the corniche in Qurum, and at the Shangri-La's Barr Al Jissah Resort & Spa in Muscat. When director Milan Luthria became ill with a virus, shooting was postponed for three days. To make up the lost time Luthria persuaded Kumar to work on two consecutive Sundays, the first time he had worked on a Sunday since Priyadarshan's 2006 Bhagam Bhag. The remainder of the film was shot on location in Khala, on the Sassoon Docks and at Mukesh Mills in Mumbai. The shoot was wrapped up by January 2013.

=== Effects ===
The film's visual effects (VFX) were by Reliance MediaWorks, which also produced computer-generated imagery (CGI) for Balaji Motion Pictures and Luthria for its prequel, Once Upon a Time in Mumbaai (2010). Since the company was also generating VFX for the yet-unreleased Chennai Express (2013) its roster of animators and compositors was divided into two teams. The Once Upon ay Time in Mumbai Dobaara! team consisted of 40 artists, who augmented 600 digital shots in one month. Luthria informed the company that Dobaara! was set during the 1980s, with car chases requiring visual effects. About 25 percent were shot against chroma key backgrounds, since they would have been difficult to film otherwise. Scenes in the Sharjah Cricket Association Stadium in the United Arab Emirates were recreated three-dimensionally with polygonal modelling in Autodesk Maya instead of the live-action plates used for shots in Muscat. Adobe Photoshop and ZBrush were used to add texture to matte paintings in the background and the 3D models. Outdoor shots in Mumbai (such as Colaba Causeway and Ballard Pier) were replaced by interior and exterior live-action plates from Oman. According to Sanjiv Naik, the film's VFX supervisor, the last few scenes were the most difficult ones to shoot. In the last scene where Khan is lying wounded in the cargo hold of a ship, the camera zooms out to reveal the word Mumbai. The VFX shot was captured in 2,000 frames which took 15 days to complete, with the camera panning out only 30 feet in reality. Except for the interior shot of Kumar, the remaining shots were digital. The live action was filmed with RED and Arri's Alexa digital motion-picture camera.

=== Casting ===
Emraan Hashmi, who appeared in the original film, was initially chosen to play the lead role. However, Luthria was looking for an older actor and chose Kumar for the role of Shoaib Khan (based on Dawood Ibrahim). In February 2012 it was announced that there were two male leads in the film, the second said to be Shahid Kapoor, but the following month Imran Khan was confirmed as the second male lead. Many actresses were considered for the female lead, including Ileana D'Cruz, Kareena Kapoor, Kangana Ranaut, Asin, Sonam Kapoor and Deepika Padukone, but in April it was reported that Sonakshi Sinha had been cast. Sonali Bendre was also signed as a lead character in the film, thus replacing Prachi Desai. The film marked Bendre's first role since Shankar Dada MBBS. She did not charge her fees for the film as Sobha Kapoor, one of the producers of the film has been the friend of her mother-in-law for the past 40 years, and also out of gratitude for Luthria, who shot her first song Sambhala Hai Maine in the 1994 film Naaraaz. In November 2012, it was announced that the film was scheduled for release on Eid 2013. Kumar revealed during the trailer launch of the film about having no aspirations to set new benchmarks on a role previously enacted by Hashmi. Khan in preparation for his role in the film drew inspiration from Jackie Shroff and Anil Kapoor, copying their mannerisms, behaviour and dressing style by watching DVD's of films starring them produced in the 1980s. Back in those days copying mannerism of film stars drew appreciation from peers.

== Promotion and distribution ==
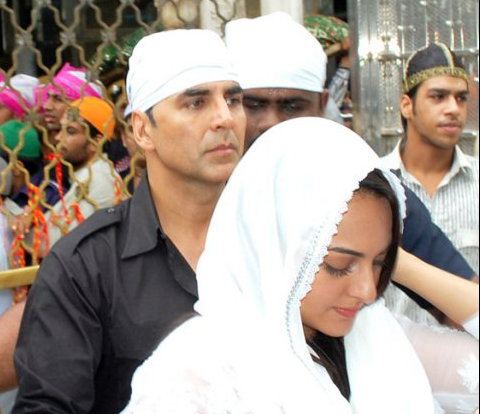
Akshay Kumar and Sonakshi Sinha visiting the Ajmer Sharif to pray for the film's success

Akshay Kumar played a fictitious gangster based on Dawood Ibrahim. Kumar's character's look was revealed on a reality show on Aapka Colors. Kumar's entrance on the show was supposed to be accompanied by music after a scene from the prequel (choreographed by director Milan Luthria), followed by an action sequence. The scene had a "minor glitch", believed to be a failed attempt to sabotage Kumar's entrance. The scene was performed twice, taking a toll on Kumar's back and leading to the cancellation of a public appearance. The film would reportedly feature a scene with Kumar watching a cricket match, but whether the match was between India and Pakistan at the Sharjah Cricket Association Stadium during the 1980s was unconfirmed. The first trailer premiered in Mumbai on 27 May 2013, where many of the film's outdoor scenes were shot. To promote the film, Kumar flew from New York (where he was on holiday with his family) to Birmingham to watch the India-Pakistan ICC Champions Trophy match on 15 June 2013 at Edgbaston Cricket Ground. A second trailer of the film was released on 1 July 2013, with narration by Kumar's character (Shoaib Khan), revealing plot details such as the rivalry between Kumar's and Imran Khan's characters for Jasmine's love. The trailer described Khan as the film's antihero, featuring action sequences between Shoaib Khan and Aslam (Imran Khan). Mohar Basu of Koimoi praised the second trailer, its background score, direction and action choreography, saying it "is even better than the film's first trailer" and has "an explosive impact on its audiences".

Producer Ekta Kapoor promoted the film's second trailer on 5 July 2013, buying prime-time (8 to 11 pm) slots on four television channels. She also spent 20 million rupees for a slot on a leading channel for a promotion for the film. Akshay Kumar, Sonakshi Sinha and Imran Khan (the three leads) promoted the film on Comedy Nights with Kapil, hosted by Kapil Sharma. The show was telecasted on 3 August 2013. Kumar, Sinha, Khan, Kapoor and most of the other cast and crew visited the Dargah Sharif (a shrine to the Sufi saint Moinuddin Chishti in Ajmer) on Monday morning, 5 August, to pray for the film's success and the well-being of all involved.

Hollywood actor Al Pacino enjoyed the film's promotion, saying that the promos and posters reminded him of The Godfather when business associate Barry Navidi showed him the theatrical trailer (Pacino portrayed Michael Corleone, son of Vito Corleone). Akshay Kumar said of Pacino's response: "A touch of appreciation is always held dearly in an actor's arms, even if it's from the simplest of people like our beloved spot boys. But to have your work spoken of so kindly by the world's most admired gangster Al Pacino himself – I had goose-bumps thinking about him watching the promo! I was so humbled, not only as an actor but as a fan of his legendary work. I pray he enjoys the final piece as much as he enjoyed the promo!" Actor Rishi Kapoor, on whom the original version of the song Tayyab Ali was picturised in Amar Akbar Anthony, praised Imran Khan's performance and the song after an impromptu meeting with Khan (who was concerned about comparisons between the versions) during a dubbing session for the film.

The Logo of the film containing the final title

The film's title has been changed several times. The media first referred to the production as Once Upon a Time in Mumbaai 2, although it was earlier officially known as Once Upon a Time in Mumbaai Again. Due to the producer's beliefs in astrology and numerology, the film was renamed Once Upon a Time in Mumbaai Dobara ("again" in Hindi). A "y" and an extra "a" were added, making it Once Upon ay Time in Mumbai Dobaara!.

It was promoted at the unveiling of a line of LED televisions by manufacturer Arise India with appearances by Kumar, Sinha, Khan and Kapoor. In addition to visiting the Dargah Sharif and the Balaji shrine in South India to pray for the success of her films before their release, Kapoor fasted during Ramazan for the film's success and planned visits to Mumbai's Mohamed Ali Road to celebrate iftaari and feed the poor. Chennai Express and Once Upon ay Time in Mumbai Dobaara! were originally not scheduled for release by Pakistani distributors and exhibitors, but deals were finalised to release both films in Pakistan. In an effort to discourage cinema audience from using Mobile phones at theatres with the help of a short-film featuring Kumar in his character, Shoaib Khan from the film. The short directed by Luthria was shown in PVR Cinemas from 31 May 2013 till the film's theatrical release. The film was available on Netflix.

== Soundtrack ==
The soundtrack of Once Upon ay Time in Mumbai Dobaara! features five songs, with three of them were composed by Pritam, and two of them by Anupam Amod. The latter also recreated the song "Tayyab Ali" which is originally composed by Laxmikant-Pyarelal and written by Anand Bakshi, from the 1977 film Amar Akbar Anthony. The lyrics for all the songs were penned by Rajat Arora, including the recreated version of "Tayyab Ali". The first single "Ye Tune Kya Kiya", sung by Javed Bashir and composed by Pritam, was released on 13 June 2013, as the lead single from the soundtrack album. The full soundtrack album was released by T-Series on 17 July 2013, with all tracks available for digital download as singles on the digital music platform iTunes.

== Release and reception ==
Once Upon ay Time in Mumbai Dobaara!'s teaser trailer was released along with Yeh Jawaani Hai Deewani, which released on 31 May 2013.

Once Upon ay Time in Mumbai Dobaara! was initially scheduled to be released on Eid, 8 August 2013 was pushed back to 15 August 2013, to avoid clashing with Rohit Shetty's directorial venture, Chennai Express starring Shah Rukh Khan. The decision was made by Jitendra on Shah Rukh Khan's request after a meeting was held between the producers of the respective films so as to provide both each of the films ample opportunity of earning-well at the box office without diminishing each other's profits.

Once Upon ay Time in Mumbai Dobaara! was released on 1,300–1,600 screens for India's 67th Independence Day, and some cinemas were sold out. The screen count increased on 16 August to 2,500–2,700 nationwide.

=== Critical reception ===
Once Upon ay Time in Mumbai Dobaara! received mixed-to-negative reviews. Anupama Chopra gave the film three out of five stars in The Hindustan Times: "Once Upon a Time in Mumbaai Dobaara! had me cheering for the bad guy. Which, at least in the movies, is never a bad thing. The film gets one extra star for Akshay Kumar, who makes a stellar killer". Madhureeta Mukherjee awarded the film 3.5 out of five stars in The Times of India, telling readers to watch the film only for its flattering dons and their heroines, saying "there's nothing criminal about it!" She praised Milan Luthria for capturing the essence of the film's setting and Kumar's portrayal of Shoaib Khan: "Bhai act with flamboyance and mojo ... He gets a chance to do what he does best – herogiri (albeit less menacing, more entertaining), with charisma and clap-trap dialoguebaazi" but criticised Imran Khan's "ill-at-ease" rogue, the second half of the film for being "at times too overbearing" and said, "this film has its moments, but it's not as compelling as the prequel." Vinayak Chakrovorty gave the film two-and-a-half out of five stars in India Today: "OUATIMD should remind Bollywood what we all always knew: Never make a sequel just for the heck of it if you don't have a genuine idea to entertain". Subhash K. Jha termed the film as "one of the most ill-timed gangster dramas" criticising the acting of all the three leads, praising only the short cameo of Sonali Bendre.

The film drew a number of negative reactions from the film critics. Subhra Gupta gave the film a half-star out of five in The Indian Express, saying "After all the shoot-outs and bang-bangs are over, you are left with a film which leaves you with so little new that you wonder if there's any juice left in this style of the retro gangsta flick. Or are we heading for a third-time-in-Mumbai-Tibara?" Rajeev Masand of CNN-IBN gave the film 1.5 out of five stars, describing the film as the "equivalent of getting a root canal". He criticised the naivety of the three leads: Kumar for his "in-your-face flamboyance", Khan for playing an "urban rich kid slumming it out at a dress-up party" and both for "rat-a-tat punch lines", but praised Sonali Bendre's cameo as Mumtaz. Mohar Basu gave the film two out of five stars in Koimoi, criticising the melodrama and the "lacklustre chemistry", remarking that the film "lacks the effervescence and naturalness of its prequel".

Once Upon ay Time in Mumbai Dobaara! and its predecessor Once Upon a Time in Mumbaai have been described as having a storyline and characters similar to the life of Dawood Ibrahim. Luthria and Kapoor have "repeatedly drilled home the notion that Shoaib Khan could be any gangster and not necessarily Dawood" a position that Kumar has also stated.

=== Box office ===
Once Upon ay Time in Mumbai Dobaara! opened well, with sold-out showings (particularly in Delhi, Mumbai, Punjab, Uttar Pradesh and Hyderabad) due to its release on Independence Day eve. Due to limited screen availability (about 1,000), Balaji Motion Pictures negotiated with the producers of Chennai Express to release 1,000 more screens for a total of 2,700. Despite the low number of screens, the film netted ₹90 million on its opening day. Due to competition from Chennai Express the film earned ₹366 million (₹273 million three-day) over its extended four-day weekend, considered a poor result. Earnings dropped on Monday to ₹40 million. The film did better on Tuesday and Wednesday due to Raksha Bandhan, earning ₹85 million on both days. It earned ₹511 million (₹485 million seven-day) during its eight-day first week. During its second weekend the film dropped nearly 90 percent, earning ₹45 million to bring its total to ₹555 million. The film earned ₹70 million during its second week, bringing its total to ₹580 million. Despite this, it was declared a "flop" by Box Office India. The film did not do well overseas, earning $1.55 million during its first weekend. In total, the film grossed ₹917.1 million ($15.65 million) worldwide.

== Home media ==
The film was scheduled to be released on DVD and Blu-ray by Shemaroo Entertainment in early November, and pre-release orders were available on Flipkart, Amazon and other online shopping sites in early October. On Amazon, the expected delivery date was 7 November 2013 for Blu-ray preorders, with the DVD released by 26 October. The Blu-ray version was released on 27 October as a 50 GB single disc with 1080p H.264/MPEG-4 AVC video and an aspect ratio of 2.35:1 (instead of the 2.39:1 theatrical ratio) and Dolby DTS-HD Master Audio 5.1 and Dolby Digital 5.1 audio. The film was made available on Netflix.

== Impact ==
After the film's mainly negative reviews Akshay Kumar lashed out at critics, accusing them of lacking an understanding of the audience and the basic ideas of filmmaking. There were rumours about a feud between Kumar and Ekta Kapoor about the former's distancing himself from the project and not promoting it enough. The three leads attended the inaugural 2013 Indian Premier League match between Kolkata Knight Riders and Delhi Daredevils to promote the film, but the match organisers asked their cameramen not to focus on the actors. After this, a disappointed Kumar asked Kapoor to re-arrange the film's marketing schedule.

== Awards and nominations ==
Zee Cine Awards—

- Nominated, Best Actor in a Negative Role: Akshay Kumar.

== See also ==
- Once Upon a Time in Mumbaai
- Bollywood films of 2013
