= List of awards and nominations received by Sonakshi Sinha =

Sonakshi Sinha awards and nominations
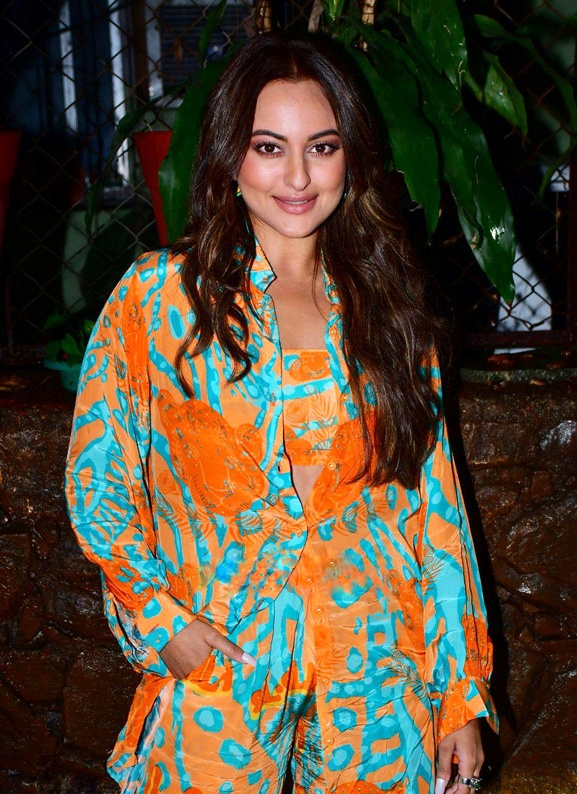
- Sinha at Krome Studio in 2023
Awards and nominations
Award	Wins	Nominations
Producers Guild Awards	1	2
Filmfare Awards	1	2
Screen Awards	1	5
Zee Cine Awards	2	3
Stardust Awards	1	5
BIG Star Entertainment Awards	1	6
IIFA Awards	1	2
Lions Gold Awards	1	1
Indian Film Festival of Melbourne	0	2
ETC Bollywood Business Awards	1	1
Others	15	18

Totals (Note: Certain award groups do not simply award one winner. They acknowledge several different recipients, have runners-up, and have third place. Since this is a specific recognition and is different from losing an award, runner-up mentions are considered wins in this award tally. For simplification and to avoid errors, each award in this list has been presumed to have had a prior nomination.)
- Wins: 29
- Nominations: 50

Sonakshi Sinha is an Indian actress known for her work in Hindi films. Sinha is the recipient of 25 accolades into her credit. She won the Filmfare Award for Best Female Debut for her performance in 2010 debut action romance Dabangg. She has received five Stardust Awards nominations out of which she won Superstar of Tomorrow Female for Dabangg (2010). She received two IIFA Awards and two Star Guild Awards Best Actress nomination for her performances in Rowdy Rathore (2012), Dabangg 2 (2013) and Son of Sardaar (2013).

Sinha has won the Zee Cine Awards for Best Actress Critics for her critically acclaimed performance in the period romantic drama Lootera (2012) including Best Actress at the Indian Film Festival of Melbourne and won the Most Entertaining Actress In a Romantic Film at the BIG Star Entertainment Awards for the same respectively.

== Awards and nominations ==
Year	Award	Category	Work	Result	Ref.
2011	Apsara Film & Television Producers Guild Awards	Best Female Debut	Dabangg	Won	
2011	Filmfare Awards	Best Female Debut	Dabangg	Won	
2011	International Indian Film Academy Awards	Star Debut of the Year – Female	Dabangg	Won	
2011	Star Screen Awards	Most Promising Newcomer – Female	Dabangg	Won	
2011	Stardust Awards	Superstar of Tomorrow – Female	Dabangg	Won	
2011	Stardust Awards	Best Thriller/Action Actress	Dabangg	Nominated	
2011	Zee Cine Awards	Best Female Debut	Dabangg	Won	
2011	Zee Cine Awards	Best International Female Icon	Dabangg	Nominated	
2013	People's Choice Awards India	Favorite Youth Movie Icon	—N/a	Nominated	
2013	Nickelodeon Kids' Choice Awards India	Best Movie Actress	—N/a	Nominated	
2013	People's Choice Awards India	Favorite Movie Actress	Rowdy Rathore	Nominated	
2013	Stardust Awards	Best Thriller/Action Actress	Rowdy Rathore	Nominated	
2013	Stardust Awards	Best Thriller/Action Actress	Dabangg 2	Nominated	
2013	Stardust Awards	Best Comedy/Romance Actress	Son of Sardar	Nominated	
2013	BIG Star Entertainment Awards	Most Entertaining Actor in a Comedy Film – Female	Son of Sardar	Nominated	
2014	BIG Star Entertainment Awards	Most Entertaining Actor in a Romantic Role – Female	Lootera	Won	
2014	BIG Star Entertainment Awards	Most Entertaining Film Actor – Female	Lootera	Nominated	
2014	Filmfare Awards	Best Actress	Lootera	Nominated	
2014	Apsara Film & Television Producers Guild Awards	Best Actress in a Leading Role	Lootera	Nominated	
2014	Screen Awards	Best Actress	Lootera	Nominated	
2014	Screen Awards	Popular Choice (Female)	Lootera	Nominated	
2014	Zee Cine Awards	Best Actress (Critics)	Lootera	Won	
2014	International Indian Film Academy Awards	Best Actress	Lootera	Nominated	
2014	Stardust Awards	Best Thriller/Action Actress	Holiday: A Soldier Is Never Off Duty	Nominated	
2015	Indian Telly Awards	Best Judge Panel	Indian Idol	Nominated	
2015	South Indian International Movie Awards	Best Debut Actress – Tamil	Lingaa	Nominated	
2023	Indian Film Festival of Melbourne	Best Actress in a Series	Dahaad	Nominated	
2023	Indian Television Academy Awards	Best Actress – Drama (OTT)	Dahaad	Nominated	
2023	Filmfare OTT Awards	Best Actress Drama Series	Dahaad	Nominated	
2023	Filmfare OTT Awards	Best Actress Drama Series Critics	Dahaad	Won	
