= OUATIM =

OUATIM can refer to:

- Once Upon a Time in Mexico, 2003 American film.
- Once Upon a Time in Mumbaai, 2010 Indian film.
- Once Upon ay Time in Mumbai Dobaara!, 2013 Indian film.
