= Befikra =

Single by Meet Bros & Aditi Singh Sharma
- Released: 28 June 2016
- Recorded: Meet Bros recording studio
- Genre: Pop
- Length: 5:52
- Label: T-Series
- Lyricist: Kumaar
- Producer: Bhushan Kumar

Meet Bros singles chronology
"Aaj Mood Ishqholic Hai" (2015)	"Befikra" (2016)	"Gal Ban Gayi" (2016)

Music video
- "Befikra" on YouTube

"Befikra" (English: Carefree) is a song recorded by Indian music director duo Meet Bros and Indian singer Aditi Singh Sharma featuring Tiger Shroff and Disha Patani.

== Music video ==
The music video shows the lives of two carefree people played by Tiger Shroff and Disha Patani.
