= Pranutan Bahl =

Indian actress (born 1993)

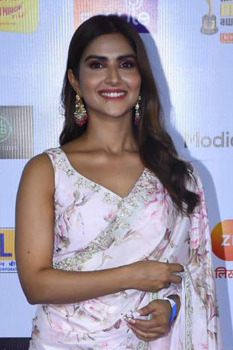
- Bahl in 2020
- Born: 10 March 1993 (age 33); Mumbai, Maharashtra, India
- Education: Government Law College; University of Mumbai
- Occupations: Actress; lawyer
- Years active: 2019–present
- Parents: Mohnish Bahl (father); Ekta Sohini (mother)
- Family: Mukherjee-Samarth family

Pranutan Bahl (born 10 March 1993) is an Indian actress and a professional lawyer, who primarily works in Hindi films. The daughter of actors Mohnish Bahl and Ekta Sohini, Bahl made her acting debut with Notebook (2019) for which she received a nomination for the Filmfare Award for Best Female Debut. She has since starred in Helmet (2021) and Amar Prem Ki Prem Kahani (2024).

== Early life and background ==
Bahl was born on 10 March 1993 to actors Mohnish Bahl and Ekta Sohini in Mumbai, Maharashtra. She is the granddaughter of actress Nutan and Rajnish Bahl. She is also the grandniece of Tanuja, and the niece of Kajol and Tanisha Mukerji. Her paternal great-grandparents were Shobhna Samarth and Kumarsen Samarth, and great-great-grandmother was Rattan Bai. She was named Pranutan after her paternal grandmother, famous actress Nutan.

She completed her graduation in Legal Science & Law (B.L.S. LLB) from Government Law College and obtained Master of Laws (LLM) degree from University of Mumbai, both in Mumbai. Bahl is a professional lawyer.

== Career ==
Bahl started her career with the short film Essential Like No Other, portraying Kaira Khanna.

Bahl made her film debut in 2019 with Notebook opposite Zaheer Iqbal. She portrayed a Kashmiri teacher, Firdaus Quadri. A critic of Bollywood Hungama noted, "Pranutan Bahl is stunning and has a supreme screen presence. She delivers a first-rate performance." Charu Thakur from India Today stated, "Keeping with the simplicity of their characters, Pranutan and Zaheer bring out the innocence they are required to". She received Screen Award for Best Female Debut and Filmfare Award for Best Female Debut nominations for her performance.

Bahl next appeared in the 2021 film Helmet, opposite Aparshakti Khurana. The film tries to change the taboo and hesitancy associated with use of condoms in India. She portrayed Rupali, a girl who supplies floral arrangements in weddings. It released on ZEE5. Deccan Herald noted, "Pranutan, impresses in a couple of scenes but deserved a meatier role". While Times of India said, "She portrays her character convincingly".

Following a two-year hiatus, Bahl played a loud Punjabi girl, Mandy who is in love with a gay man played by Sunny Singh in Amar Prem Ki Prem Kahani. The film was released on JioCinema. Rachit Gupta from Filmfare opined that despite little focus on her character, she delivers a "wonderfully wicked performance".

== Filmography ==
Key
†	Denotes films that have not yet been released

=== Films ===
Year	Title	Role	Notes	Ref.
2017	Essential Like No Other	Kaira Khanna	Short film	
2019	Notebook	Firdaus Quadri		
2021	Helmet	Rupali		
2024	Amar Prem Ki Prem Kahani	Mandy		
2026	Pyaade †	TBA	Post-production	

=== Music video appearances ===
Year	Title	Singer(s)	Ref.
2020	"Phir Hasenge"	Vibhas	
2021	"Kaise Hum Bataye"	Nikhita Gandhi	
2021	"Lag Raha Hai Dil Deewana"	Palak Muchhal	
2021	"Rona Nahi"	Raj Barman	
2022	"Baarish"	Gurnazar	
2023	"Heart Di Beat Pe"	Nikhita Gandhi	
2023	"Mehendi Lagi Hai"	Stebin Ben, Shakshi Holkar	

== Awards and nominations ==
Year	Award	Category	Work	Result	Ref.
2019	Screen Awards	Best Female Debut	Notebook	Nominated	
2020	Filmfare Awards	Best Female Debut	Notebook	Nominated	
2022	Filmfare OTT Awards	Best Supporting Actor in a Web Original Film (Female)	Helmet	Nominated	

== See also ==
- List of Hindi film actresses
- List of Indian film actresses
