= Notebook (2019 film) =

2019 film directed by Nitin Kakkar

- Theatrical release poster
- Directed by: Nitin Kakkar
- Written by: Dialogues: Payal Ashar; Sharib Hashmi; Screenplay: Darab Farooqui
- Based on: The Teacher's Diary by Nithiwat Tharathorn
- Produced by: Salman Khan; Murad Khetani; Ashwin Varde
- Starring: Zaheer Iqbal; Pranutan Bahl
- Cinematography: Manoj Kumar Khatoi
- Edited by: Sachindra Vats
- Music by: Vishal Mishra
- Production companies: Salman Khan Films; Cine1 Studios
- Distributed by: Yash Raj Films
- Release date: 29 March 2019
- Running time: 112 minutes
- Country: India
- Language: Hindi
- Budget: ₹15 crore
- Box office: est. ₹3.72 crore

Notebook is a 2019 Indian Hindi-language romantic drama film directed by Nitin Kakkar and produced by Salman Khan under Salman Khan Films and Murad Khetani and Ashwin Varde under Cine1 Studios. A remake of the 2014 Thai film The Teacher's Diary by Nithiwat Tharathorn, it stars debutantes Zaheer Iqbal and Pranutan Bahl, daughter of actor Mohnish Bahl. Notebook tells the story of a young retired army officer in Jammu and Kashmir who joins his father's school as a teacher to save it from closure, and falls in love with the previous teacher after reading through her memorabilia left behind in the drawers. The film was released on 29 March 2019 and received mixed response from critics with praises for leads performances.

The Thai film is based on a real life teacher of a houseboat school, Ban Ko Allocated School (Ruen Phae Branch), on the Ping River at the Bhumibol Dam in Mae Ping National Park in Li district, Lamphun province. The motif of a left behind diary in that film is based on an incident from the marriage of a producer's friend.

== Plot ==
Captain Kabir Kaul, a young retired Indian Army officer, decides to teach in his late father's school, the Wular Public School. Located in a rural community with not many residents, the school will be closed if there is no teacher to teach. At the school, he finds a diary left behind in the desk drawer by the previous teacher, Firdaus Quadri. Children start coming to school after learning that a new teacher has arrived. However, they disobey Kabir, leading him to think that he cannot teach, but after reading Firdaus's diary, he gains confidence and decides to try.

Kabir's girlfriend breaks up with him and is having an affair with a new man, as she believes that Kabir is now unfit to marry her because he has left the army. He is heartbroken but takes solace in the schoolchildren and Firdaus's diary, writing comments in it. He learns about Imran, one of the schoolchildren, whose father, Yakub, wants him to help in the household rather than attending school. Using help from the diary, Kabir succeeds in bringing Imran back to school. He decides to burn Firdaus's diary after learning she is getting married, but retrieves it in a fit of epiphany.

On her wedding day, Firdaus finds out that her fiancé was cheating on her and that the other woman is carrying his child. She calls off the marriage and returns to Wular Public School. The children are overjoyed to have her back, though Kabir is gone. She finds her diary in the same drawer she had left it in a year before and reads Kabir's comments. He had written that he was in love with the writer and had learned valuable lessons from her diary. Curious, Firdaus asks the principal about Kabir the same way he had asked about her. The principal tells her that he has gone to take a teaching course.

One day, Firdaus confronts Yakub, who wants to take Imran back. Imran sees Kabir and runs to him, saying he doesn't want to leave the school. Yakub threatens Kabir with a gun and punches Kabir. Imran, realizing that Yakub might kill Kabir, takes the gun to shoot his father. Kabir stops him. Yakub realizes his mistake and slowly lowers the gun. In a mid-credits scene, it is shown that Firdaus sent the children back home so that she can talk and spend time with Kabir with whom she has fallen in love.

== Cast ==
- Zaheer Iqbal as Captain (Retd.) Kabir Kaul
  - Ahmed as Young Kabir
- Pranutan Bahl as Firdaus Quadri
- Mir Sarwar as Yakub
  - Kosar Chandpuri as Young Yakub
- Mozim Bhatt as Junaid
- Mir Mehrooz as Imran
- Mir Zayaan as Tariq
- Baba Hatim as Waqar
- Adiba Bhatt as Saniya Mir
- Soliha Maqbool as Shama
- Saniya Mir as Pregnant girl
- Mallik Mushtaq as Junaid's father
- Saroj Sharma as Junaid's mother
- Farrhana Bhatt as Dolly

== Marketing and release ==
Salman Khan unveiled the first poster of film on Valentine's Day. A special screening of the film was held for Bollywood stars and family on 28 March 2019. The makers chose not to release the film in Pakistan due to the 2019 Pulwama attack. The film was made available as VOD on Amazon Prime Video in June 2019.

== Reception ==
=== Critical response ===
On Rotten Tomatoes, the film had scored 22% based on nine reviews with an average rating of 4.2/10. Nandini Ramnath of Scroll.in writes, "Notebook has an unremarkable lead pair, an underwhelming dull love story in which the actors don't share the screen for nearly the entire duration of the narrative, some of the most ravishing views of Kashmir yet, a bunch of adorable children and a soundtrack with a few good tunes." Rachit Gupta of The Times of India rated the film with three stars out of five and says, "Notebook is an easy watch where you can appreciate the humour, drama and romance. But the film leaves you wanting for more. Perhaps with more creativity in writing, this young romantic saga could have achieved more." Writing for Daily News and Analysis Meena Iyer finds nothing wrong with the film but wished, "it hadn't been so antiseptic." She rates the film with three stars out of five.

Jyoti Sharma Bawa of Hindustan Times rates the film with two and half stars out of five and praises the cinematographer Manoj Kumar Khatoi. She opines that the cinematographer has ensured that every frame is bursting with beauty and The visual portrayal would stay with the viewers long after they forget the sub-par love story. Charu Thakur of India Today gives two and half stars out of five and concludes the review as, "If you are looking for some old-world romance this weekend, Notebook is definitely a recommended watch for you." Bollywood Hungama while rating it with three stars out of five they feel that the film would appeal only to multiplex audience. They sum up review by saying, "On the whole, NOTEBOOK boasts of exemplary performances by the debutants and is beautifully shot while stressing on the importance of education."

== Soundtrack ==
Notebook

Soundtrack album by Vishal Mishra
- Released: 8 March 2019
- Recorded: 2018
- Genre: Feature film soundtrack
- Length: 26:53
- Language: Hindi
- Label: T-Series
External audio
- Audio Jukebox on YouTube

Vishal Mishra chronology
5 Weddings (2018)	Notebook (2019)	Kabir Singh (2019)

The music and background score of the film is composed by Vishal Mishra while the lyrics are penned by Manoj Muntashir, Kaushal Kishore, Akshay Tripathi, Abhayendra Kumar Upadhyay and Vishal Mishra. The song "Bhumro" is a recreation of the original song from the film Mission Kashmir (2000). "Main Taare" was originally sung by Atif Aslam but was later removed (see #Marketing and release). The Atif Aslam version was unofficially released on YouTube.

Track listing
No.	Title	Lyrics	Singer(s)	Length
1.	"Nai Lagda"	Akshay Tripathi	Vishal Mishra, Asees Kaur	4:47
2.	"Laila"	Abhayendra Kumar Upadhyay, Vishal Mishra	Dhvani Bhanushali	4:05
3.	"Bhumro"	Kaushal Kishore	Kamaal Khan, Vishal Mishra	3:21
4.	"Safar"	Kaushal Kishore	Mohit Chauhan	5:47
5.	"Notebook Epilogue"		Vishal Mishra	4:16
6.	"Main Taare"	Manoj Muntashir	Salman Khan	4:37
7.	"Main Taare"	Manoj Muntashir	Atif Aslam	4:37
Total length:				26:53

== Awards and nominations ==
Year	Award	Category	Recipient	Result	Ref.
2019	Screen Awards	Best Male Debut	Zaheer Iqbal	Nominated	
2019	Screen Awards	Best Female Debut	Pranutan Bahl	Nominated	
2020	Filmfare Awards	Best Female Debut	Pranutan Bahl	Nominated	
2020	Filmfare Awards	Best Male Debut	Zaheer Iqbal	Nominated	

== See also ==
- Notebook
- Kashmir conflict
- Insurgency in Jammu and Kashmir
