= Amar Prem Ki Prem Kahani =

- Promotional release poster
- Directed by: Hardik Gajjar
- Written by: Rupinder Inderjit
- Produced by: Jyoti Deshpande; Parth Gajjar; Poonam Shroff
- Starring: Sunny Singh; Aditya Seal; Pranutan Bahl
- Cinematography: Hanoz V. Kerawala
- Edited by: Kanu Prajapati; Prashant Singh Rathore
- Music by: Prasad Sashte
- Production companies: Jio Studios; A Hardik Gajjar Films; Backbencher Pictures Production
- Distributed by: JioCinema
- Release date: 4 October 2024
- Running time: 117 minutes
- Country: India
- Language: Hindi

Amar Prem Ki Prem Kahani (transl. Amar Prem's Love Story), is a 2024 Indian Hindi-language drama film directed by Hardik Gajjar and written by Rupinder Inderjit. The film stars Sunny Singh, Aditya Seal in the title role, alongside Pranutan Bahl.

== Cast ==
- Sunny Singh as Amar
- Aditya Seal as Prem
- Pranutan Bahl as Mandy
- Diksha Singh
- Jinder Sethi
- Tarsem Paul
- Baljinder Kaul
- Sanju Solanki
- Jhumma Mitra as Bijoya Prem's Mother

== Production ==
The film was announced on JioCinema starring Sunny Singh and Aditya Seal. The film was shot in Chandigarh and London.

== Music ==
Amar Prem Ki Prem Kahani

Soundtrack album by Prasad Sashte
- Released: September 24, 2024
- Genre: Feature film soundtrack
- Length: 11:22
- Language: Hindi
- Label: Times Music

Track listing
No.	Title	Lyrics	Singer(s)	Length
1.	"Kasturi"	Kunaal Vermaa	Arijit Singh	3:52
2.	"Dheemi Dheemi"	Kunaal Vermaa	Aasa Singh	3:58
3.	"Gabru"	Priyanka R Bala	Swarjit Singh, Divya Bhura	3:57
4.	"Main To Adhura"	Sahil Sultanpuri	Varun Jain	3:34
5.	"Cha Chadheya"	Priyanka R Bala	Sudhir Yaduvanshi	3:00
6.	"Chaap Tilak"	Traditional	Javed Ali	4:06
Total length:				22:27

== Release ==
The trailer of the film was released on 24 September 2024. It premiered on JioCinema on 4 October 2024.

== Reception ==
Sushmita Dey of Times Now gave the film a rating of 3/5 stars. Rishabh Suri from Hindustan Times dismissed the film as "senseless".
