= Helmet (film) =

2021 film by Satram Ramani

- Promotional poster
- Directed by: Satram Ramani
- Written by: Rohan Shankar
- Story by: Amit Tyagi; Satram Ramani; Ajay Singh; Gopal Mudhane
- Produced by: Dino Morea
- Starring: Aparshakti Khurana; Pranutan Bahl; Abhishek Banerjee; Ashish Verma; Sharib Hashmi
- Cinematography: Milind Jog
- Edited by: Manish Pradhan
- Music by: Score: Ketan Sodha; Songs: Tanishk-Vayu; Tony Kakkar; JAM8; Nirmaan
- Production companies: Sony Pictures Networks Productions; DM Movies
- Distributed by: ZEE5
- Release date: 3 September 2021
- Running time: 104 minutes
- Country: India
- Language: Hindi

Helmet is a 2021 Indian Hindi-language comedy film with a strong message of contraceptive awareness directed by Satram Ramani and produced by Sony Pictures Networks and Dino Morea. It features Aparshakti Khurana, Pranutan Bahl, Abhishek Banerjee, Ashish Verma and Sharib Hashmi in lead roles. The film premiered on 3 September 2021 on ZEE5. It tries to change the taboo and hesitancy associated with use of condoms in India.

== Plot ==
Lucky and Rupali are very much in love and want to get married but her father objects as Lucky is an orphan and has lower income then the boy he has chosen for Rupali to marry. Lucky wants to start his own band and tries to get loan but Rupali's father and uncle are so powerful that they warn everyone not to help him. Lucky comes up with an idea of looting a truck containing electronic goods and involves his two friends Sultan and Minus in his ploy. Lucky, Sultan and Minus loot the truck but instead of electronic equipment, they find condoms inside. The trio then has no option but to sell the condoms by wearing a helmet so nobody can recognise them.

== Cast ==
- Aparshakti Khurana as Lucky
- Pranutan Bahl as Rupali
- Abhishek Banerjee as Sultan
- Ashish Verma as Minus
- Ashish Vidyarthi as Jogi, Rupali's father
- Sharib Hashmi as Bunty Bhai
- Saanand Verma as Shambhu, medical shop owner
- Shrikant Varma as Gupta, Band Owner
- Dino Morea as Biker, Cameo appearance

== Production ==
The Principal photography commenced on 19 December 2019 in Varanasi. The film was wrapped up on 20 January 2020.

== Soundtrack ==
Helmet

Soundtrack album by Tanishk-Vayu, Tony Kakkar, JAM8 and Nirmaan
- Released: 23 August 2021
- Recorded: 2020
- Genre: Feature film soundtrack
- Length: 15:22
- Language: Hindi
- Label: Zee Music Company

Official audio
- Helmet - Full Album on YouTube

The music of film was composed by Tanishk-Vayu, Tony Kakkar, JAM8 and Nirmaan while lyrics written by Vayu, Tony Kakkar, Shloke Lal and Nirmaan.

Track listing
No.	Title	Lyrics	Music	Singer(s)	Length
1.	"Doli"	Vayu	Tanishk-Vayu	Brijesh Shandilya	2:46
2.	"Barbaad" (Duet Version)	Nirmaan	Nirmaan	Goldboy, Shipra Goyal	2:25
3.	"Mauka Mauka"	Shloke Lal	JAM8	Shubham Shirule	3:13
4.	"Band Baj Gaya"	Tony Kakkar	Tony Kakkar	Tony Kakkar, Vibhor Parashar	2:33
5.	"Barbaad" (Male Version)	Nirmaan	Nirmaan	Goldboy	4:25
Total length:					15:22

== Reception ==
Rahul Desai of Film Companion wrote, "The biggest irony of Helmet is that India's condom commercials over the years have been far more imaginative, cheekier and...slicker."
