= Meet Bros =

Indian musical duo

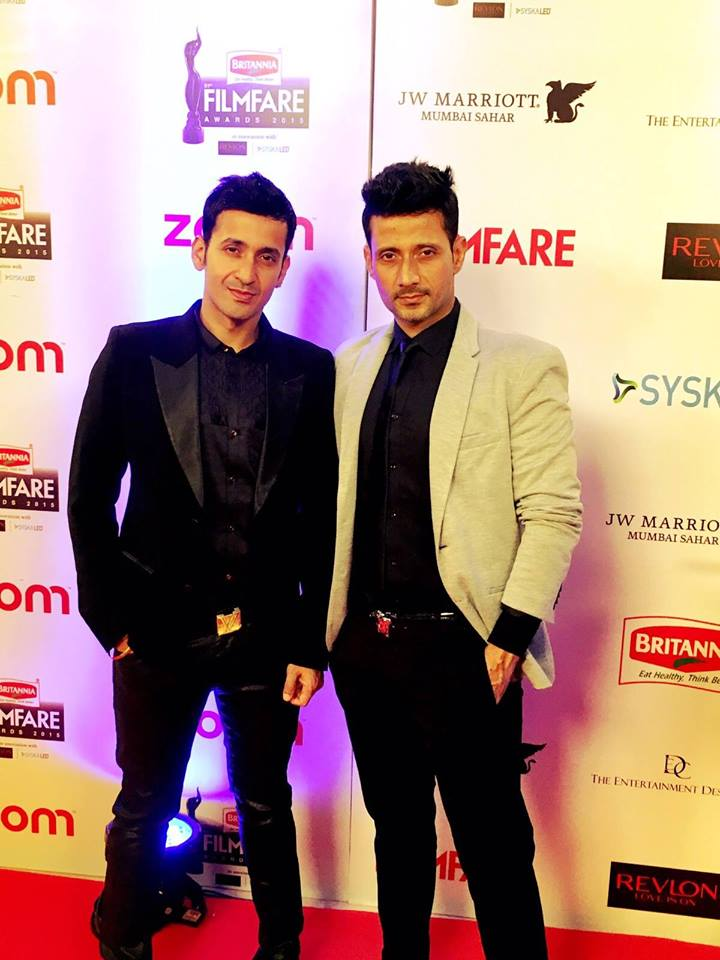
- Meet Bros at IIFA Awards 2016

Background information
- Also known as: Meet Brothers Anjjan
- Origin: Gwalior, Madhya Pradesh, India
- Genres: Pop; Film score; Soundtrack
- Occupations: Music director; ACTOR Composer; Arranger; Conductor; Music producer
- Years active: 2005–present
- Labels: MB Music; T-Series; Zee Music Company
- Members: Manmeet Singh; Harmeet Singh
- Past members: Anjjan Bhattacharya
- Website: www.meetbros.com

Meet Bros is an Indian musical duo from Gwalior, Madhya Pradesh. The duo consists of brothers Manmeet Singh and Harmeet Singh. They were formerly known as Meet Bros Anjjan with longtime collaborator Anjjan Bhattacharya.

Initially starting out as actors, the duo switched to composing and singing after the success of their first song "Jogi Singh Barnala Singh". They began with composing for Isi Life Mein and Do Dooni Chaar but it was with Kyaa Super Kool Hain Hum and OMG – Oh My God! that they got their first recognition as music directors.

Meet Bros' most well-known and critically acclaimed songs are "Baby Doll" from Ragini MMS 2 and "Chittiyaan Kalaiyaan" from Roy. Both songs feature the vocals of Kanika Kapoor and the latter was part of a soundtrack that fetched them multiple awards including the Filmfare Award for Best Music Director, the Screen Award for Best Music Director, and the IIFA Award for Best Music Director.

== Early life ==
Meet Brothers are biological brothers from Gwalior. Their early education took place in Scindia School, Gwalior Fort, Gwalior. After this they went to Mumbai for higher education. Harmeet completed his graduation from Sydenham College, Mumbai. They started acting in TV serials and Bollywood to step in, but after the success of their solo song "Jogi Singh Barnala Singh", they chose music, leaving the acting. After that they started working as music director in films. Other than being a popular television personality, Manmeet has also produced a couple of serials for television including a hit comedy serial for Star Plus. While Harmeet had done advertising commercials and acted in Hindi soaps such as Kahani Ghar Ghar Ki and Kkusum. Both have not received formal education in music. Both have worked in the TV serial Kyunki Saas Bhi Kabhi Bahu Thi and Shagun.

== Career ==
After leaving acting, Meet Brothers worked as a music director in Bollywood. Many years ago, they met Anjjan Bhattacharya in a program and the three decided to work together and they named their trio as Meet Bros Anjjan. The three together made music for many songs and gave their voices. They made the song "Baby Doll", which they sang with Kanika Kapoor in the 2014 film Ragini MMS 2. In 2015, Anjjan Bhattacharya got separated from the trio and started his own music business. Meet Bros also opened their own recording studio named "Meet Bros Recording Studio".

"Pink Lips", "Hangover", "Party To Banti Hai", "Chittiyaan Kalaiyaan" were their songs. They both also hold concerts and take part in the concert. They have received the Filmfare Awards for their music.

In 2025, they released a promotional single, "Modi Hai Toh Mumkin Hai", which was a ballad praising the Prime Minister of India, Narendra Modi. The music video featured actors Varun Dhawan, Rajkummar Rao, Arshad Warsi and Vikrant Massey. The song faced widespread backlash on social media and the actors were termed "spineless" for participating in the song.

== Personal life ==
The older brother, Manmeet married Karishma Modi in 2002, and they have a daughter. Karishma works in Hindi TV serials.

The younger brother, Harmeet Singh was married to late actress Shefali Jariwala in 2004. The couple later got divorced in 2009.

== Discography ==
=== Pop Albums ===
Year	Album	Track(s)
2002	Boond	All songs (Composed by Sanjeev Srivastava)
2006	Fully Reloaded	All songs (Composed by Harry Anand)

=== Film soundtracks ===
==== As Meet Bros Anjjan (2010–2015, 2020, 2023-2024) ====
Year	Film	Track(s)
2010	Isi Life Mein	All Songs (Debut film)
2010	Do Dooni Chaar	All songs (Co-composed by Ankit Tiwari)
2011	Yeh Dooriyan	"Baat Jo Thi" "Lets Rock Sarasarahat"
2012	Paan Singh Tomar	"Kero Mama"
2012	Kyaa Super Kool Hain Hum	"Shirt Da Button" (Note: A different version of this song is included in the soundtrack.) "Hum Toh Hain Cappucino" "Volume High Karle"^{2} "Shirt Da Button Version 2"
2012	OMG – Oh My God!	"Mere Nishaan" "Krishna Theme (Flute)"
2013	Shootout at Wadala	"Goli" "Aye Manya"
2013	Warning 3D	"Bebasi"
2013	Policegiri	"Robinhood"
2013	Zanjeer	"Pinky" "Katilana" (Note: One or more remixed version of this song is included in the soundtrack.) "Khoche Pathan Ki Jubaan Qawaali"
2013	Satyagraha	"Janta Rocks"
2013	Boss	"Boss" (Along with Yo Yo Honey Singh) (Note: One or more remixed version of this song is included in the soundtrack.) "Pitah Se Hai Naam Tera" "Boss Entry - Theme" "Boss" (Remix by DJ Khushi) "Boss Ganpati" (Mix)
2014	Ragini MMS 2	"Baby Doll" (Note: One or more remixed version of this song is included in the soundtrack.)
2014	Bhoothnath Returns	"Party Toh Banti Hai" (Along with Palash Muchhal)
2014	Hate Story 2	"Pink Lips" (Note: One or more remixed version of this song is included in the soundtrack.)
2014	Kick	"Hangover" (Note: A different version of this song is included in the soundtrack.) (Note: One or more remixed version of this song is included in the soundtrack.) "Hai Yehi Zindagi" (Note: A different version of this song is included in the soundtrack.) "Hai Yehi Zindagi Version 2" "Hai Yehi Zindagi Version 3"
2014	Singham Returns	"Singham Returns Theme" (Note: One or more remixed version of this song is included in the soundtrack.)
2014	Kkoli: A Journey of Love	"Elitin Beletin" "Jodi Chao" (Note: A different version of this song is included in the soundtrack.) "Tumi Acho" "Jodi Chao (Reprise)"
2015	Sharafat Gayi Tel Lene	"Selfiyaan"
2015	Baby	"Beparwah"
2015	Roy	"Chittiyaan Kalaiyaan"
2015	Ek Paheli Leela	"Glamorous Ankhiyaan" "Dhol Baaje" "Main Hoon Deewana Tera"
2015	Calendar Girls	"Awesome Mora Mahiya" "We Will Rock The World"
2015	Dharam Sankat Mein	"Tu Takke"
2020	Shimla Mirchi	"Sau Galtiyaan" "Ishq Di Feeling" "Mirchi Shimle Di" (Last collaboration, late release)
2023	Satyaprem Ki Katha	"Gujju Pataka" (Collaboration after 8 years)
2024	Love Sex Aur Dhokha 2	"Gulabi Ankhiyan"

==== As Meet Bros (2015–present) ====
Year	Film	Track(s)
2015	All Is Well	"Nachan Farrate"
2015	Welcome Back	"Tutti Bole Wedding Di" "Nas Nas Mein"
2015	Hero	"Dance K Legend"
2015	Singh Is Bliing	"Dil Kare Chu Che"
2015	Hate Story 3	"Tu Isaq Mera" (Note: One or more remixed version of this song is included in the soundtrack.) "Neendein Khul Jaati Hain" "Love to Hate Me"
2016	Mastizaade	"Mastizaade" "Hor Nach" "Kamina Hai Dil"
2016	Ki & Ka	"High Heels" "Most Wanted Munda" "Pump It (The Workout Song)" "Kabir Most Wanted Munda"
2016	Baaghi	"Girl I Need You" "Cham Cham"
2016	One Night Stand	"Ijazat" "Ishq Da Sutta"
2016	Junooniyat	"Nachange Sari Raat" "Junooniyat" "Pagalon Sa Naach"
2016	The Legend of Michael Mishra	"Luv Letter"
2016	Wajah Tum Ho	"Dil Mein Chupa Loonga"
2016	Dongari Ka Raja	"Choli Block Buster"
2017	Judwaa 2	"Aa To Sahi"
2017	Munna Michael	"Shake Karaan"
2017	Naam Shabana	"Baby Besharam"
2017	Raabta	"Main Tera Boyfriend"
2018	Welcome to New York	"Meher Hai Rab Di"
2018	Race 3	"Heeriye"
2019	Dream Girl	All songs
2019	Marjaavaan	"Kinna Sona" "Kinna Sona (Atif Aslam Version)" "Kinna Sona (Armaan Malik Version)"
2020	Shimla Mirchi	"Mainu Rang Lageya"
2020	Jai Mummy Di	"Lamborghini"
2022	Govinda Naam Mera	"Pappi Jhappi"
2022	Kahani Rubberband Ki	"Ho Sake Toh"
2023	Jogira Sara Ra Ra	"Torture"
2023	Satyaprem Ki Katha	"Gujju Pataka" (Mukda composed by Anjjan) "Sun Sajni" "Raat Baki"
2023	Dream Girl 2	"Dil Ka Telephone 2.0" "Main Marjawangi" "Jamnapar"
2024	Kuch Khattaa Ho Jaay	"Bottley Kholo"
2024	Love Sex Aur Dhokha 2	"Gulabi Ankhiyan" (Mukda composed by Meet Bros Anjjan)
2024	Luv Ki Arrange Marriage	"Ghodi"
2025	Love in Vietnam	"Burrah Burrah"
2025	Mastiii 4	"Pakad Pakad"
2025	Mastiii 4	"One In Crore"
2025	Mastiii 4	"Daga"
2025	Mastiii 4	"Nagin"

=== Singles ===
Year	Track	Artist(s)
2015	"Aaj Mood Ishqholic Hai"	Meet Bros ft. Sonakshi Sinha
2016	"Befikri"	Meet Bros ft. Aditi Singh Sharma
2016	"Gal Ban Gayi"	Meet Bros ft. Sukhbir, Neha Kakkar and Yo Yo Honey Singh
2016	"Party Animals"	Meet Bros ft. Poonam Kay
2017	"Yaari Ve"	Meet Bros ft. Prakriti Kakar
2018	"Nachdi Firaangi"	Meet Bros ft. Kanika Kapoor
2018	"Love Me"	Meet Bros ft. Khushboo Grewal
2018	"Main Jaandiyaan"	Meet Bros ft. Neha Bhasin & Piyush Mehroliyaa
2018	"Shy Mora Saiyaan"	Meet Bros ft. Monali Thakur
2018	"Thade Rahiyo"	Meet Bros ft. Kanika Kapoor
2018	"TOTTA"	Meet Bros ft. Sonu Nigam
2018	"Mujhe Kaise, Pata Na Chala"	Meet Bros ft. Papon
2019	"Assi Trendsetter"	Meet Bros ft. Bohemia
2019	"Aawara Shaam Hai"	Meet Bros ft. Piyush Mehroliyaa
2019	"Zaroori Hai Kya Ishq Main"	Meet Bros ft. Papon
2020	"Ek Diamond Da Haar Lede Yaar"	Meet Bros ft. Jyotica Tangri
2025	"Modi Hai Toh Mumkin Hai"	Meet Bros ft. Adarsh Shukla, Divya Bhatt

== Awards and nominations ==
=== As Meet Bros Anjjan ===
Year	Award	Category	Nominated work	Result	Ref(s)
2015	7th Mirchi Music Awards	Best Song Producer (Programming & Arranging)	"Baby Doll" from Ragini MMS 2 (with Bharat Goel)	Won	
2016	61st Filmfare Awards	Best Music Director	Roy (with Amaal Mallik and Ankit Tiwari)	Won	
2016	6th GiMA Awards	Best Music Director	Roy (with Amaal Mallik and Ankit Tiwari)	Nominated	
2016	6th GiMA Awards	Best Film Album	Roy (with Amaal Mallik and Ankit Tiwari)	Won	
2016	17th IIFA Awards	Best Music	Roy (with Amaal Mallik and Ankit Tiwari)	Won	
2016	8th Mirchi Music Awards	Album of the Year	Roy (with Amaal Mallik and Ankit Tiwari)	Nominated	
2016	8th Mirchi Music Awards	Listeners' Choice Album of the Year	Roy (with Amaal Mallik and Ankit Tiwari)	Won	
2016	22nd Screen Awards	Best Music Director	Roy (with Amaal Mallik and Ankit Tiwari)	Won	
2016	11th Star Guild Awards	Best Music	Roy (with Amaal Mallik and Ankit Tiwari)	Won	
2016	Zee Cine Awards 2016	Best Music	Roy (with Amaal Mallik and Ankit Tiwari)	Nominated	
2017	9th Mirchi Music Awards	Indie Pop Song of the Year	Befikra (with Aditi Singh Sharma)	Nominated	
