= Sonakshi Sinha =

Indian actress (born 1987)

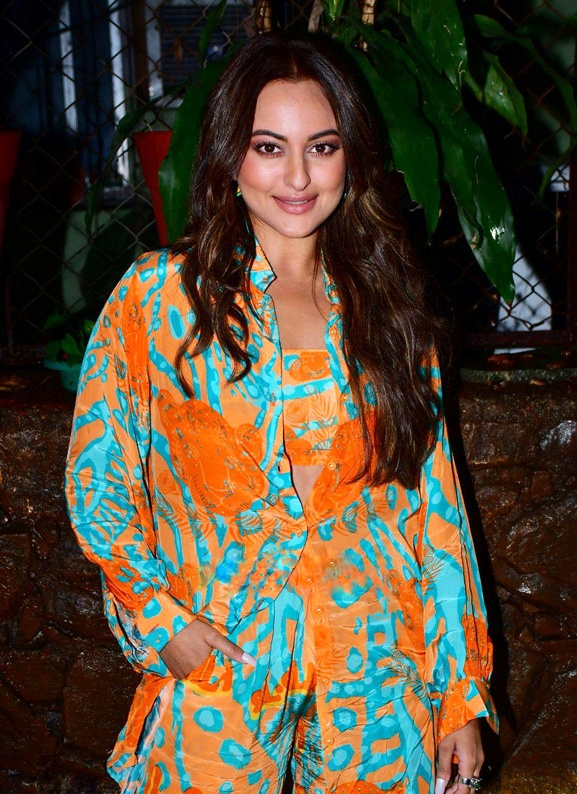
- Sinha in 2023
- Born: 2 June 1987 (age 39); Patna, Bihar, India
- Education: SNDT Women's University
- Occupation: Actress
- Years active: 2010–present
- Spouse: Zaheer Iqbal (m. 2024)
- Parents: Shatrughan Sinha (father); Poonam Sinha (mother)
- Awards: Full list

YouTube information
- Channel: Sonakshi Sinha
- Subscribers: 1.05 million
- Views: 511.6 million
- Last updated: 9 April 2026

Sonakshi Sinha (pronounced [soːnaːkʂi sɪnɦa]; born 2 June 1987) is an Indian actress who works in Hindi films and series. The daughter of actors and politicians Poonam and Shatrughan Sinha, she has appeared in Forbes India's Celebrity 100 list from 2012 to 2017, and in 2019. Her accolades include a Filmfare Award.

After working as a costume designer in independent films, she made her acting debut with the action film Dabangg in 2010, which won her the Filmfare Award for Best Female Debut. Sinha rose to prominence by playing the leading lady in several male-dominated action films, including Rowdy Rathore (2012), Son of Sardaar (2012), Dabangg 2 (2012), and Holiday: A Soldier Is Never Off Duty (2014), in addition to appearing in a variety of item numbers. Sinha received critical acclaim for playing a troubled woman suffering from tuberculosis in the period drama Lootera (2013), for which she earned a nomination for the Filmfare Award for Best Actress. This success was followed by a series of commercially unsuccessful films, with the exception of Mission Mangal (2019). She has since gained critical praise for her starring roles in the Amazon Prime thriller series Dahaad (2023) and the Netflix period drama series Heeramandi (2024), winning a Filmfare OTT Award for the former.

Aside from her acting career, she is a prominent celebrity endorser for brands and products. Sinha has ventured into singing, beginning with a song in her film Tevar (2015). Her debut single, "Aaj Mood Ishqholic Hai" was released in 2015. She has judged television dance shows including Nach Baliye (2017). Sinha is married to actor Zaheer Iqbal in 2024.

== Early life and background ==
Sinha was born on 2 June 1987 in Patna, Bihar, to film actors Shatrughan Sinha and Poonam Sinha (née Chandiramani). Her father belongs to a Bihari family while her mother is from a Sindhi Hindu family. Her father served as a member of parliament of the Bharatiya Janata Party, before he switched to the Indian National Congress in 2019. Sinha is the youngest of three children – she has twin brothers, Luv Sinha and Kush Sinha. She studied at Arya Vidya Mandir and later graduated in the fashion design program at Premlila Vithaldas Polytechnic of Shreemati Nathibai Damodar Thackersey Women's University. Sinha worked briefly as a costume designer, designing the costumes for films such as Mera Dil Leke Dekho in 2005.

== Acting career ==
=== Breakthrough and success (2010–2014) ===
Sinha made her acting debut in 2010's Dabangg, starring opposite Salman Khan. This film went on to become the highest-grossing film of 2010 and ultimately emerged as an all-time blockbuster. Sinha had to lose 30 kg in preparation for her role as a village girl. Her performance was well received, with critic Taran Adarsh noting that "Sonakshi Sinha looks fresh, acts confidently and pairs off very well with Salman. Most importantly, she delivers the right expressions and is not overpowered by the galaxy of stars in the cast." Although Sinha had no film releases in 2011, she won awards that year for her debut. This included the Filmfare Award and the IIFA Awards, among others.

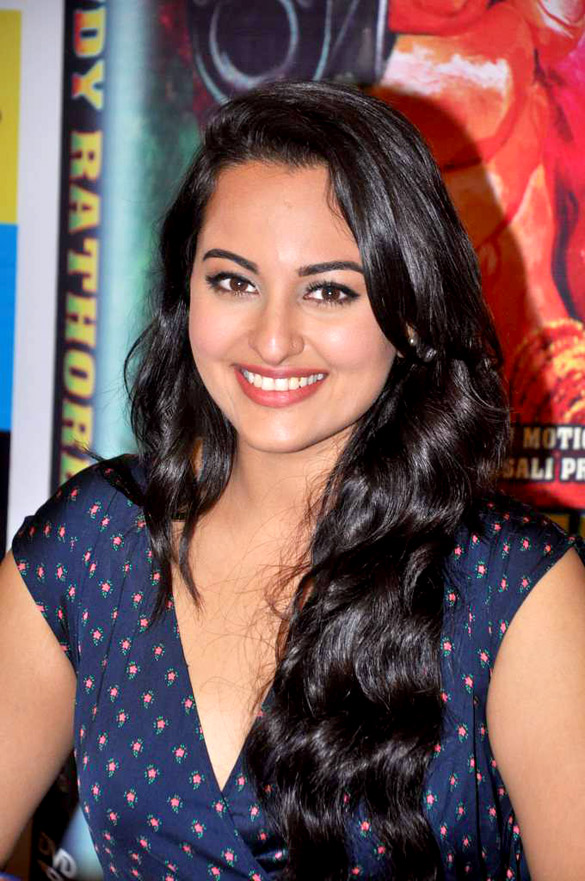
Sinha at an event for Rowdy Rathore in 2012

Sinha had four releases in 2012, the first being Prabhu Deva's Rowdy Rathore, opposite Akshay Kumar. The film opened to mixed reviews from critics, although it had a strong opening at the box office, collecting approx. ₹150.6 million (US$1.6 million) on the first day and eventually became a blockbuster. Despite this, Rajeev Masand criticized her ornamental role, writing that Sinha "seems to exist in this film only to have her midriff repeatedly pinched by Akshay Kumar." Her next film, Shirish Kunder's Joker (also opposite Akshay Kumar) proved to be a commercial disaster at the box office and received overwhelmingly negative reviews. Her third film, Ashwni Dhir's Son of Sardaar (opposite Ajay Devgn) proved to be an economic success. Saibal Chatterjee from NDTV noted that Sinha "endeavours to be pretty and dainty amid all the madness." Arbaaz Khan's Dabangg 2, the sequel to her immensely successful debut, garnered little praise from critics, though it proved to be a major financial success. Sinha also dubbed the voice role of Tooth in the Hindi version of Rise of the Guardians.

Sinha's first film of 2013 was Vikramaditya Motwane's period romantic drama Lootera, placing her opposite Ranveer Singh. Despite receiving a lukewarm response at the box office, the film received positive reviews, with Sinha's portrayal of Pakhi, a Bengali girl who is dying of tuberculosis, receiving widespread acclaim from critics. Sarita Tanwar notes that "the star of the film is undoubtedly Sinha [who gives] a mature and refined performance. She lives the character body and soul." Raja Sen agrees, saying that "Sinha plays Pakhi beautifully, creating a character who is immaculately wide-eyed and possesses casual, yet unmistakable, grace. It is a performance that starts off dreamily soft and turns harder, and she does well-etched dialogue justice like few actresses can. There's a discernible vulnerability to Pakhi throughout the film, and Sinha brings out this fragility perfectly without ever overplaying it." She next appeared in Milan Luthria's crime romance film Once Upon a Time in Mumbai Dobaara! in which she was paired with Akshay Kumar again, as well as Imran Khan. The movie was a commercial disappointment, and critic Mohar Basu labeled her "a chatterbox replete with idioticity which the director frames as naiveness." Sinha then appeared in Tigmanshu Dhulia's Bullett Raja opposite Saif Ali Khan, which was a box office flop. Her final release of the year was Prabhu Deva's R... Rajkumar opposite Shahid Kapoor. The film was commercial success, the film and her performance received mixed reviews. Taran Adarsh labeled her "repetitive" and noted that she needed to "reinvent herself." For the song Gandi Baat in R... Rajkumar, Sinha refused to wear a bikini while emerging from the pool of water out of comfort and respect. Instead, Sinha wore a saree for that sequence of the song.

In 2014, after providing the voice of Jewel in the Hindi-dubbed Rio 2, Sinha was seen in A.R. Murugadoss's action thriller Holiday: A Soldier Is Never Off Duty, a remake of the director's Tamil film Thuppakki. Starring opposite Akshay Kumar, Sinha appeared as a boxer. It received mixed-to-positive reviews from critics and emerged as a box office hit. Jyoti Sharma Bawa said of Sinha's portrayal: "Sonakshi has nothing to do much in the film and overacts in places. For an actor who has already proved her mettle in the acting department, this definitely is a downer." Sinha appeared in a music video with Yo Yo Honey Singh titled Superstar. In July, Sinha jointly bought a team in the World Kabaddi League. Her second release of 2014 was Prabhu Deva's Action Jackson, with Ajay Devgn and Yami Gautam. She made her Tamil cinema debut opposite Rajinikanth in KS Ravikumar's Lingaa, which was her final release of 2014.

=== Career fluctuations (2015–2022) ===
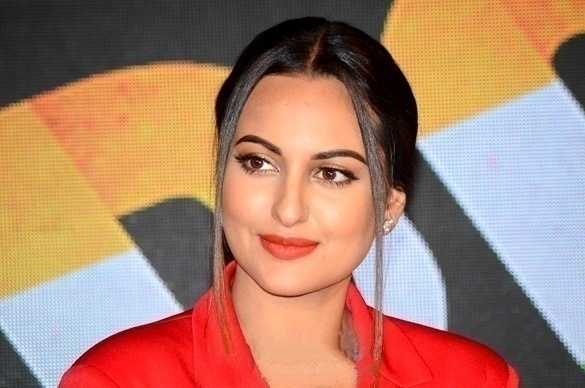
Sinha during a song launching event for Force 2, in 2016

In 2015, she appeared in Boney Kapoor's remake of Okkadu, titled Tevar, opposite Arjun Kapoor. In his review, Rajeev Masand wrote: "Sonakshi Sinha, playing another simpering damsel in another South remake, once again has nothing to do. She appears content showing up for a few dance numbers, and waiting around for a man to save her." Tevar underperformed at the box office and was one of the biggest flops of the year. Sonakshi released her debut single Aaj Mood Ishqholic Hai in collaboration with Meet Bros on 23 December 2015. The following year, Sinha starred in the remake of the 2011 Tamil film Mouna Guru, entitled Akira. The film was an action-drama from director AR Murugadoss in which she played an aggressive college student. It initially recovered 15.5 crore and went on to make over 33+ crore on box office, becoming an average grosser. Then she appeared in Abhinay Deo's action-thriller Force 2 opposite John Abraham. The film, made on a low budget, grossed over 58.75 crore and was declared an average grosser. Though Sinha's character was labeled as an unformed agent, her performance received some acclaim. Bollywood Life reviewed that "Sonakshi Sinha is believable in action scenes she got and ably supports John."

In 2017, she was seen in Sunhil Sippy's comedy film Noor, based on Saba Imtiaz's novel Karachi, You're Killing Me!. She featured in the titular role of Noor alongside Kanan Gill, Shibani Dandekar and Purab Kohli. Her performance received major acclaim, with one reviewer writing that "Sonakshi Sinha pulls off her character without appearing to try too hard." Hindustan Times wrote that "Sonakshi looks quite convincing with the grimaces, pouts, eye rolls, scowls and goofy grins – displaying an amusing dorkiness. Even when her character turns serious, Sonakshi displays her prowess and aces the grim looks." Commercially, the film flopped. Her last film release in the year was Abhay Chopra's Ittefaq, a remake of the 1969 murder mystery Ittefaq, opposite Sidharth Malhotra, and Akshay Khanna. The film was a moderate box-office success. In March 2017, Sinha announced that she was working on a new single. Despite speculation she might perform as the opening act for Canadian singer Justin Bieber's Purpose World Tour concert at the DY Patil Stadium in Mumbai on 10 May, this performance did not occur.

In 2018, she was seen in the comedy spoof film Welcome to New York, with an ensemble cast including Diljit Dosanjh and Karan Johar. The film was shot during the 2017 IIFA Awards, and was the first film to be based on an award show. It received overwhelming negative reviews and Sinha's appearance in the film was particularly criticized, with Rajeev Masand of News 18 saying that "Not very funny, unfortunately, is Sonakshi Sinha, who comes off exaggerated and out-of-step even in a film of such ridiculously low standards. She spends the bulk of her time on screen contorting her face like Jim Carrey, but with none of the same results." The film was also a box office bomb, earning only Rs. 75 lakh on its first day. The same year, Sinha appeared in the female-oriented comedy film Happy Phirr Bhag Jayegi along with Diana Penty. The film was released on 24 August 2018. As with her previous release, Happy Phirr Bhag Jayegi was a commercial disappointment. Afterwards, she made a special appearance in a song of Yamla Pagla Deewana Phir Se.

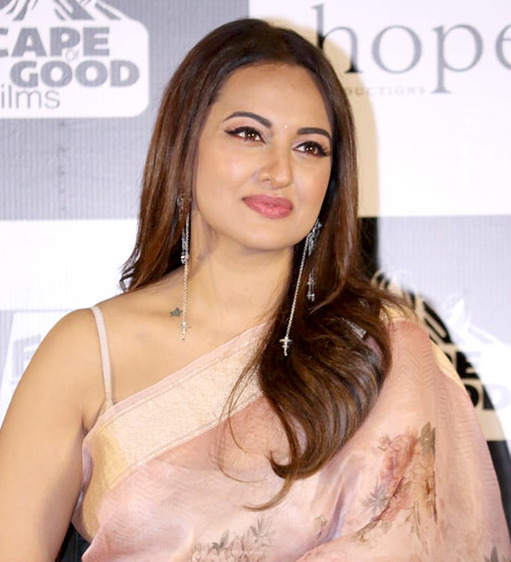
Sinha in 2019, promoting Mission Mangal

In 2019, she performed in a song ''Mungda'' in the comedy film Total Dhamaal. She next starred in the period romance film Kalank with an ensemble cast including Aditya Roy Kapur, Sanjay Dutt, Madhuri Dixit, Alia Bhatt and Varun Dhawan. The film failed to perform well commercially. In 2019, Sinha was cast in the drama film Mission Mangal, which featured an ensemble cast including Akshay Kumar, Vidya Balan and Taapsee Pannu. The project began filming in 2018, and was directed by Jagan Shakti. The film was a massive commercial success at the box-office, grossing over 200 crore on a budget of 30 crore, and receiving positive reviews from critics. Umesh Punwani commended sinha and opined, "She perform with essential ease". Her last 2019 release was the action comedy Dabangg 3 the third installment in the Dabangg film series where she reprised her role Rajjo Pandey. It received negative reviews from critics, who panned its screenplay. Anna M. M. Vetticad from Firstpost Wrote, "Sinha has little to do but pout and look pretty why she is wasting herself so". The film has a worldwide gross collection of est. ₹ 230 crores.

In 2021, she starred as Sunderben Jetha alongside Ajay Devgn, Sanjay Dutt, Nora Fatehi and Sharad Kelkar in the war drama film Bhuj: The Pride of India. The film panned by critics, who criticized its writing, pace and unrealistic situations. Saibal Chatterjee from NDTV summarised the film. "busy gathering the scattered splinters of its insipid ideas made infinitely worse by resolutely ham-fisted treatment." After this, she portrayed a plus size women, in the comedy film Double XL which was released in November 2022 with negative reviews from critics. Shubhra Gupta for The Indian Express wrote "It is a massive opportunity wasted. Crashing pity."

=== Resurgence in streaming platforms (2023–present) ===
Sinha expanded to web in 2023, with Dahaad, where she played a police officer. Her portrayal earned her the Filmfare OTT Award for Best Actress Critics – Drama Series. WION's Shomini Sen called her "brilliant" and added that she brings "certain maturity to her character".

In 2024, she briefly appeared in the science-fiction action film Bade Miyan Chote Miyan alongside Akshay Kumar, Tiger Shroff and Prithviraj Sukumaran. It was theatrically released on Eid to negative reviews from critics and was a box office bomb. Monika Rawal Kukreja stated that she brings "nothing new to the table". Following this, Sinha played the dual characters of courtesan mother and daughter in Sanjay Leela Bhansali's period drama Heeramandi. Nandini Ramnath of Scroll.in found her to be "in-form" and added, "Sinha is utterly comfortable with Fareedan’s dastardly scheming; plus, she has the diction to carry off the aphoristic dialogue." While, Sukanya Verma noted, "Bhansali gives Sonakshi's Fareedan a lot of heavy lifting to do and the lady does not disappoint." Later the year, she appeared alongside Riteish Deshmukh and Saqib Saleem in Kakuda, playing dual characters.

In 2025, Sinha played the titular role of an author in Nikita Roy, which marked her brother Kussh's directorial debut. Vinamra Mathur stated that Sinha is let down by weak script, despite the opportunity to shine in every frame. The film failed commercially.

== Personal life ==
Sinha began dating actor Zaheer Iqbal in 2017. They starred together in the film Double XL in 2022. Sinha married Iqbal on 23 June 2024 in a civil ceremony under the Special Marriage Act.

Sinha is a vegan. In an interview, Sinha stated that she prefers to stay with her parents, Shatrughan Sinha and Poonam Sinha even after buying her own house. When asked if she has any plans to move out of her parents' home, she was quick to add that staying alone is a very tough thing and she does not want to do that. However, Sinha finally moved out in 2023.

Sinha is a self-professed animal lover, and she posed for a PETA campaign advocating the adoption and sterilization of dogs and cats. She has starred in a one-minute video PSA, urging viewers to adopt animals and have them sterilised. She has been quoted as saying: "Breeders, pet stores and people who don't sterilize their animals are responsible for all the animals who end up homeless. Every time someone buys a dog or cat from a breeder or pet store, a homeless animal roaming the streets or waiting in an animal shelter loses a chance at a home and a good life." In 2022, PETA India named her their 2022 Person of the Year. She also promotes breaking the stereotypes of typical body size.

== In the media ==
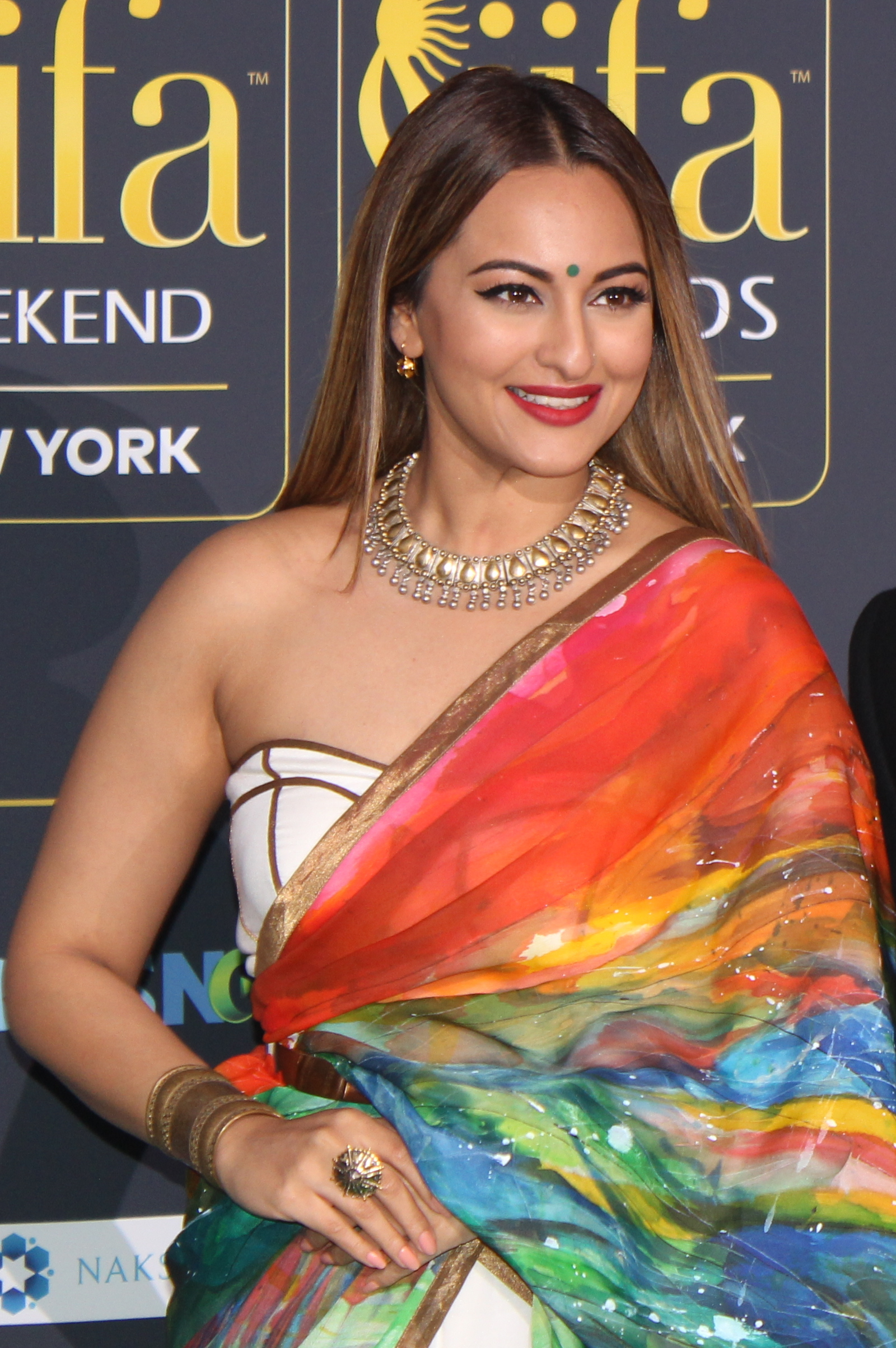
Sinha in 2017

Megha Mahindru of Vogue found Sinha to be "Barefaced, beautiful and brave". Nikita Sawant of Femina termed Sinha a "gifted actor" and noted, "Wry sense of humour, tinkling laughter and chilled-out persona are just a few of the many things right with her." Commenting on her performance in Lootera, Devesh Sharma of Filmfare noted, "She's done her share of arm candy roles and even in those she managed to strike her own niche. With Lootera, she gave an advance notice of her amazing capabilities as a performer."

Sinha has appeared in Forbes India's Celebrity 100 list. In 2012, she placed 41st with an estimated annual income of ₹107 million (US$1.1 million). In 2019, she placed 59th with an estimated annual income of ₹61.4 million (US$660,000). She was also inducted into the Bollywood Walk of Fame at Bandra Bandstand, where her hand print was preserved. In 2013 Sinha was included in Rediff.com's "Top 10 Bollywood performances" and "Change-Makers of Bollywood" list. In 2014, she ranked 5th in its "Top 10 Bollywood actresses" list. Sinha is an endorser for brands and products including Dabur, Chik Shampoo, Provogue and Gitanjali Jewellers. In 2022, she launched her own nail brand SOEZI. In 2024, Sinha was placed 71st on IMDb's List of 100 Most Viewed Indian Stars.

== Filmography ==
=== Films ===
Key
†	Denotes films that have not yet been released

Year	Title	Role	Notes	Ref
2010	Dabangg	Rajjo Pandey		
2012	Rowdy Rathore	Parvathi "Paro" Bharadwaj		
2012	Joker	Diva		
2012	OMG – Oh My God	Herself	Special appearance in song "Go Go Govinda"	
2012	Son of Sardaar	Sukhmeet Kaur Sandhu		
2012	Dabangg 2	Rajjo Pandey		
2013	Himmatwala	Herself	Special appearance in song "Thank God It's Friday"	
2013	Lootera	Pakhi Roy Chaudhary		
2013	Once Upon ay Time in Mumbai Dobaara!	Jasmine Sheikh		
2013	Boss	Herself	Special appearance in songs "Party All Night" and "Har Kisi Ko"	
2013	Bullett Raja	Mitali		
2013	R... Rajkumar	Chanda		
2014	Holiday: A Soldier Is Never Off Duty	Saiba Thapar		
2014	Action Jackson	Khushi		
2014	Lingaa	Mani Bharathi	Tamil film	
2015	Tevar	Radhika Mishra		
2015	All Is Well	Herself	Special appearance in song "Nachan Farrate"	
2016	Akira	Akira Sharma		
2016	Force 2	Kamaljit Kaur		
2017	Noor	Noor Roy Chaudhary		
2017	Ittefaq	Maya Sinha		
2018	Welcome to New York	Jinal Patel		
2018	Happy Phirr Bhag Jayegi	Harpreet "Happy" Kaur		
2018	Yamla Pagla Deewana: Phir Se	Herself	Special appearance in song "Rafta Rafta"	
2019	Total Dhamaal	Herself	Special appearance in song "Mungda"	
2019	Kalank	Satya Chaudhry		
2019	Khandaani Shafakhana	Babita "Baby" Bedi		
2019	Mission Mangal	Eka Gandhi		
2019	Laal Kaptaan	Noor Bai	Special appearance	
2019	Dabangg 3	Rajjo Pandey		
2020	Ghoomketu	Herself	Special appearance	
2021	Bhuj: The Pride of India	Sunderben Jetha Madharparya		
2022	Double XL	Saira Khanna		
2024	Bade Miyan Chote Miyan	Captain Priya Dixit		
2024	Kakuda	Indira / Gomati (Note: Sonakshi played two characters.)		
2025	Nikita Roy	Nikita Roy		
2025	Jatadhara	Dhanapisachini	Bilingual film	
2026	System	Neha Rajvansh	Prime Video film	
2026	Tu Hai Meri Kiran	Kiran Malhotra		

=== Television ===
Year	Title	Role	Notes	Ref
2015	Indian Idol	Herself	Reality Series; Judge	
2015	Indian Idol Junior	Herself	Reality Series; Judge	
2017	Nach Baliye	Herself	Reality Series; Judge	
2017	Om Shanti Om	Herself	Reality Series; Judge	
2019	Myntra Fashion Superstar	Herself	Judge	
2023	Dahaad	Anjali Bhaati		
2024	Heeramandi	Fareedan/ Rehana		

=== Music video appearances ===
Year	Title	Performer	Ref.
2013	"Betiyaan" (Save the Girl Child)	Shankar Mahadevan, Sunidhi Chauhan, Sonu Nigam	
2014	"Desi Kalakaar"	Yo Yo Honey Singh	
2021	"Mil Mahiya"	Raashi Sood	
2022	"Blockbuster"	Ammy Virk, Asees Kaur	
2023	"Kalaastar"	Yo Yo Honey Singh	

== Discography ==
Year	Title	Album/Film	Music	Lyrics	Co-singer(s)	Ref.
2015	"Let's Celebrate"	Tevar	Imran Khan			
2015	"Aaj Mood Ishqholic Hai"	Non-album single	Meet Bros Anjjan	Kumaar	Meet Bros Anjjan	
2016	"Rajj Rajj Ke" (Version 1)	Akira	Vishal–Shekhar	Kumaar	Vishal Dadlani	
2017	"Move Your Lakk"	Noor	Badshah		Badshah, Diljit Dosanjh	
2018	"Chin Chin Choo"	Happy Phirr Bhag Jayegi	Sohail Sen	Qamar Jalalabadi	Jassi Gill, Mudassar Aziz	
2018	"Rafta Rafta Dekho Medley"	Yamla Pagla Deewana Phir Se	Vishal Mishra	Kunwar Juneja	Rekha, Vishal Mishra, Jordi Patel, Disha Sharma, Akash Ojha	
2021	"Hum Hindustani"	Non-album single	Dilshaad Shabbir Shaikh	Kashish Kumar	Lata Mangeshkar, Amitabh Bachchan, Sonu Nigam, Padmini Kolhapure, Kailash Kher, Alka Yagnik, Jannat Zubair, Siddhanth Kapoor, Shraddha Kapoor, Tara Sutaria, Shabbir Kumar, Anil Agarwal, Ankit Tiwari, Shruti Haasan	

== Awards and nominations ==
From the Filmfare Awards, Sinha has won Best Female Debut for Dabangg and was nominated for Best Actress for Lootera.
