= Tu Hai Meri Kiran =

2026 Indian Hindi-language romantic thriller film

- Directed by: Karan Rawal
- Written by: Karan Rawal
- Produced by: Vishal Rana; Sarvesh Goel; Ashwani Kumar; Manoj Darak; Nrupal Patel
- Starring: Sonakshi Sinha; Zaheer Iqbal; Ankit Gupta; Sherlin Seth; Zarina Wahab
- Music by: Songs: OAFF and Savera; Background Score: Advait Nemlekar; Shalom Benjamin
- Production companies: Echelon Productions; AND Productions; PAM Studios
- Distributed by: Pen Marudhar
- Release date: October 23, 2026 (India)
- Running time: 123 minutes
- Country: India
- Language: Hindi
- Budget: 25 crore
- Box office: 0.474 crore

Tu Hai Meri Kiran is a 2026 Indian Hindi-language psychological romantic thriller film written and directed by Karan Rawal. Produced by Vishal Rana, Sarvesh Goel, Ashwani Kumar, Manoj Darak, and Nrupal Patel under the banners of Echelon Productions, AND Productions, and PAM Studios, the film stars Sonakshi Sinha and Zaheer Iqbal in the lead roles, alongside Ankit Gupta, Sherlin Seth, Zarina Wahab, and Purnendu Bhattacharya in supporting roles. It was theatrically released on 23 October 2026.

== Premise ==
Set across two timelines a decade apart—2016 and 2026—the story follows Kiran (Sonakshi Sinha), a bestselling author living in September 2026, who discovers a mysterious old flip phone. Through the phone, she connects with Samar (Zaheer Iqbal), a stranger living ten years in the past in 2016. What initially begins as an intriguing cross-time connection soon takes a dark turn when Samar realizes Kiran knows the future and develops a dangerous, manipulative obsession with possessing her at any cost, altering events in the past that begin to unravel Kiran's present life.

== Cast ==
- Sonakshi Sinha as Kiran Malhotra
- Zaheer Iqbal as Samar Khurana
- Ankit Gupta as Riyaan Malhotra, Kiran's husband
- Sherlin Seth as Sakshi
- Zarina Wahab as Seema Khurana
- Purnendu Bhattacharya as Mahesh Mittal

== Music ==
The film's songs are composed by OAFF and Savera, while the background score is composed by Advait Nemlekar and Shalom Benjamin. The soundtrack album rights were acquired by Saregama, and includes tracks such as "Humsafar" sung by Vishal Mishra and "Na Roko".

== Release ==
The first look of the film was unveiled on 1 October 2026, followed by the official trailer on 6 October 2026. Tu Hai Meri Kiran was released theatrically in India on 23 October 2026.

== Reception ==
Rekha Khan of Navbharat Times commended the acting of Sinha, Iqbal and Gupta along with the intriguing first half, though she felt the time-travel narrative became confusing in the second half. Aaj Tak lauded the core concept of connecting two timelines through a phone, while critiquing the writing for leaving certain plot questions unanswered.
