= Zaheer Iqbal =

Indian actor (born 1988)

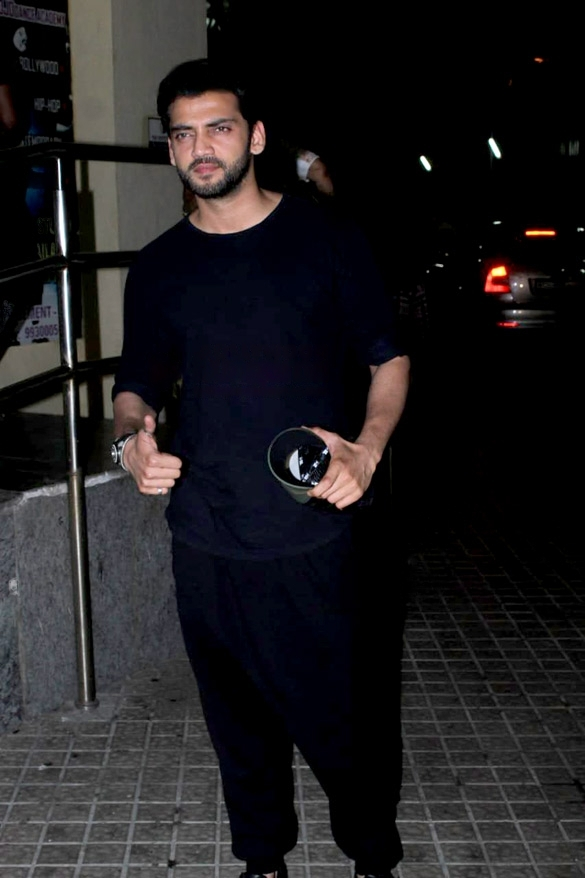
- Iqbal in 2019
- Born: Zaheer Iqbal Ratansi; 10 December 1988 (age 37); Mumbai, Maharashtra, India
- Occupation: Actor
- Years active: 2019–present
- Spouse: Sonakshi Sinha (m. 2024)

Zaheer Iqbal Ratansi (born 10 December 1988) is an Indian actor who primarily works in Hindi films. Iqbal made his acting debut with the romantic drama Notebook (2019), which earned him nomination for Filmfare Award for Best Male Debut

== Early life ==
Iqbal was born on 10 December 1988. Born in a Gujarati family, his father Iqbal Ratansi is a jeweller while his sister Sanam Ratansi, is a celebrity stylist and costume designer.

== Career ==
On the advice of actor Salman Khan, Iqbal made his acting debut in 2019 with Notebook, opposite Pranutan Bahl, where he portrayed an ex-army officer and a Kashmiri teacher, Kabir Kaul. The film itself was produced by Khan. Bollywood Hungama noted, "Zaheer Iqbal is quite sincere. Despite his tough look, he plays the vulnerable part very well and comes across as quite endearing." Charu Thakur of India Today states, "Keeping with the simplicity of their characters, Pranutan and Zaheer bring out the innocence they are required to".

Iqbal next portrayed a London-based line producer Zorawar Rahmani in the 2022 film, Double XL opposite Sonakshi Sinha. The film received negative reviews and Shilajit Mitra of The New Indian Express stated that he "hogs up" screen time pulling Salman impressions from the 1990s. The film was box office failure. In 2024, Iqbal played Raheel alongside Aayush Sharma in Ruslaan, which again failed commercially.

== Personal life ==
Zaheer started dating Sonakshi Sinha in 2017. They starred together in the film Double XL in 2022. He married her on 23 June 2024 in a civil ceremony under the Special Marriage Act.

== Filmography ==
Key
†	Denotes films that have not yet been released

=== Films ===
Year	Title	Role	Notes	Ref.
2019	Notebook	Kabir Kaul		
2022	Double XL	Zorawar Rehmani		
2024	Ruslaan	Raheel		
2026	Tu Hai Meri Kiran	Samar Khurana		

=== Music video appearances ===
Year	Title	Singer(s)	Ref.
2022	"Blockbuster"	Ammy Virk and Asees Kaur	

== Awards and nominations ==
Year	Award	Category	Work	Result	Ref.
2019	Screen Awards	Best Male Debut	Notebook	Nominated	
2020	Filmfare Awards	Best Male Debut	Notebook	Nominated	
