= Aaj Mood Ishqholic Hai =

Single by Meet Bros Anjjan & Sonakshi Sinha
- Released: 23 December 2015
- Recorded: November 2015
- Genre: Hip hop
- Length: 5:04
- Label: T-Series
- Composer: Meet Bros Anjjan
- Lyricist: Kumaar
- Producer: Bhushan Kumar

Music video
- "Aaj Mood Ishqholic Hai" on YouTube

Aaj Mood Ishqholic Hai is a hip hop single by Indian actress Sonakshi Sinha and Meet Bros Anjjan. The song is written by Kumaar and composed by Meet Bros Anjjan. It was released on 23 December 2015 under T-Series.

== Background ==
"Aaj Mood Ishqholic Hai" is a song by Sonakshi Sinha and Meet Bros Anjjan. It is the debut of Sinha as a singer. The song is composed by Meet Bros Anjjan and the lyrics is written by Kumaar. Sinha said in an interview: "I told Bhushan Kumar of T-Series about this song, he was very encouraging. Meet Brothers (musicians), lyricist Kumaar and me, we all sat together and came up with this beautiful song". The song was released on 23 December 2015 with the on YouTube, iTunes and Hungama.com.

== Music video ==
Music video was also released on 23 December 2015 under T-Series. It was shot in Goa, India and was choreographed by Salman Yusuff Khan. The music video has over 60 million views on YouTube. The song has been praised by Vishal Dadlani, Priyanka Chopra and Salim Merchant.

== See also ==
- Meet Bros Discography
