= Son of Sardaar =

2012 Indian film by Ashwni Dhir

- Theatrical release poster
- Directed by: Ashwni Dhir
- Written by: Robin Bhatt; Ashwni Dhir; Shaheen Bhatt
- Story by: S. S. Kanchi
- Based on: Maryada Ramanna by S. S. Rajamouli
- Produced by: Ajay Devgn
- Starring: Ajay Devgn; Sanjay Dutt; Sonakshi Sinha; Juhi Chawla; Salman Khan
- Cinematography: Aseem Bajaj
- Edited by: Dharmendra Sharma
- Music by: Songs: Himesh Reshammiya; Sajid–Wajid; Background Score: Sandeep Chowta
- Production companies: Ajay Devgn FFilms; YRV Infra & Media; Viacom 18 Motion Pictures; Eros International
- Distributed by: Viacom 18 Motion Pictures; Eros International
- Release date: 13 November 2012
- Running time: 141 minutes
- Country: India
- Language: Hindi
- Budget: ₹30 crore
- Box office: ₹161.48 crore

Son of Sardaar is a 2012 Indian Hindi-language action comedy film directed by Ashwni Dhir. The film stars Ajay Devgn, Sanjay Dutt, Sonakshi Sinha and Juhi Chawla. A remake of the 2010 Telugu film Maryada Ramanna, it was released on 13 November 2012.

Although competing with the Yash Raj film Jab Tak Hai Jaan, Son of Sardaar managed to do good business at the box office worldwide. It received a divided response, with praise for its humour, the performance of the entire cast, stylised action sequences, and familiar tone, but criticism for the screenplay. Box Office India declared it a superhit in India and in the overseas markets. It went on to gross ₹161.48 crore (US$17 million) worldwide.

A standalone sequel, Son of Sardaar 2, was released on 1 August 2025, with Devgn reprising his role alongside an ensemble cast featuring Mrunal Thakur opposite Devgn; it marked the final film appearance of actor Mukul Dev, who plays Tony in both films alongside Vindu Dara Singh, who plays Tito in both films.

== Plot ==
A massive rivalry exists between the Sandhus and the Randhawas. During an intense fight between the two families, Jaswinder "Jassi" Singh Randhawa's father and Balwinder "Billu" Singh Sandhu's uncle kill each other on the night of Billu's wedding with Parmeet "Pammi" Kaur. Billu ultimately vows to remain unmarried until he kills Randhawa's son. Meanwhile, Jassi's mother flees the village with Jassi, later settling in London.

Twenty-five years later, Jassi is a struggling immigrant in London. He is best friends with Pathan, who with his uncle runs a club. Jassi decides to go to India because his father left him some land in Phagwara, Punjab. Although made aware of the rivalry by Pathan, he does not worry about it as he thinks that the rivalry is now forgotten. Back in Phagwara, Billu still searches for Randhawa's son with the help of his two younger brothers, Tito and Tony. Pammi yearns for marriage with Billu to be completed. Jassi arrives in India and meets Sukhmeet "Sukh" Kaur Sandhu on a train ride from New Delhi to Phagwara. Unbeknownst to Jassi, who flirts with her, Sukh is Billu's younger sister, who is returning to Phagwara after having completed her studies in Delhi. During the train ride, Jassi falls in love with her. Once he parts ways with Sukh upon landing in Phagwara, Jassi is offered a ride by Tony to a Gurudwara, as the land behind the Gurudwara is Jassi's. Tony finds out that Jassi is Randhawa's son and tries to kill him in vain.

Jassi soon bumps into Billu at a temple as the villagers tell him that Billu would guide him to the land better. Billu is accompanied by his family and Sukh, who recognises Jassi, prompting Billu to invite Jassi to his house. Tony then reveals to Billu that Jassi is the person they were searching for these 25 years. Billu vows that he will kill Jassi as soon as he gets out of the Sandhu household. Jassi finds out that he is in the Sandhu household.

Since there is a tradition in the Sandhu household that treats guests as 'akin to God' and forbids any killings in the house during the period, Jassi feigns injury by telling everyone he has broken his back and needs to say in the house for treatment. Furious, Billu plans a number on Jassi's life. Sukh's friend Tej "Bobby" Jaswal, a doctor, finds out that Jassi has been lying all along but confides this secretly to Sukh alone.

One day, Jassi informs a local inspector that Billu and his brothers are hell bent on killing him. The inspector promises to escort him out but instead leads Jassi to a dilapidated mansion where he is confronted by Billu and his men, revealing that he was in league with Billu, who along with his group starts attacking Jassi once the inspector leaves. However, in an attempt to escape, Jassi eventually lands back into the Sandhu household again.

After a few more days, during the Lohri celebrations, Billu announces that Bobby and Sukh will be engaged the very next day. Both are initially taken aback but eventually agree. Jassi finds out that Sukh loves him too. Pammi reveals to Sukh and Bobby that she planned this engagement because she wanted Jassi, who she now knows through the land papers in his bag, is Randhawa's son, to escape; as the engagement is taking place in the Gurudwara, nobody will be in the Sandhu household. Jassi, meanwhile, decides to fight Billu's brothers so he can stop this rivalry. Sukh escapes from the engagement after strong prodding from Pammi and, surprisingly, Bobby himself, and reunites with Jassi. She wants to elope with him but Jassi wishes to end this rivalry, no matter what. Following an intense confrontation and fight between the duo, Billu's grandmother convinces him to forget about this rivalry. He decides to let go and forgive Jassi on the condition that he marry Sukh, while announcing his own marriage to Pammi after all.

== Cast ==
- Ajay Devgn as Jaswinder "Jassi" Singh Randhawa
- Sanjay Dutt as Balwinder "Billu" Singh Sandhu
- Sonakshi Sinha as Sukhmeet "Sukh" Kaur Sandhu
- Juhi Chawla as Parmeet "Pammi" Kaur
- Salman Khan as Pathan (special appearance)
- Arjan Bajwa as Tej "Bobby" Jaswal
- Puneet Issar as Inspector Sardar
- Mukul Dev as Tony Singh Sandhu
- Vindu Dara Singh as Tito Singh Sandhu
- Tanuja as Bebe ; Billu, Tito, Tony and Sukh’s Paternal Grandmother
- Sanjay Mishra as club owner in London (special appearance)
- Mukesh Tiwari in a special appearance

== Production ==
=== Development ===
Son of Sardaar is a remake of the 2010 Telugu comedy film Maryada Ramanna. In an interview, director Ashwni Dhir replied that it was only the plot that was remade; the rest was changed.

=== Filming and post-production ===
₹30 crore (US$3.1 million) was spent on making Son of Sardaar. However, an all-inclusive price tag of ₹85 crore (US$8.8 million) was also announced in the media.

The Punjabi Cultural Heritage Board raised disagreements due to some objection regarding certain scenes and dialogues. The producer and lead actor Ajay Devgn understood the objections and edited the scenes. "The creativity of the film has not been affected in any way. Every film is rectified, sometimes it's made even better," said Devgn during a press conference. "The objectionable things were very small. The writer and director of the film is Punjabi and we took care of things. Even the guy who tied my turban was from Punjab", he added.

== Soundtrack ==
Son of Sardaar

Soundtrack album by Himesh Reshammiya
- Released: October 1, 2012
- Length: 47:45
- Languages: Hindi, Punjabi
- Label: T-Series
- Producer: Himesh Reshammiya

Himesh Reshammiya chronology
Khiladi 786 (2012)	Son of Sardaar (2012)	OMG – Oh My God! (2012)

The music of the film was composed by Himesh Reshammiya while the lyrics were penned by Sameer, Shabbir Ahmed, Irshad Kamil & Manoj Yadav. Only one song, "Yeh Jo Halki Halki Khumariya", was composed by Sajid–Wajid, who were initially considered.

=== Track listing ===
No.	Title	Artist(s)	Length
1.	"Son of Sardaar"	Aman Trikha, Himesh Reshammiya	05:23
2.	"Rani Tu Mein Raja"	Mika Singh, Bhavya Pandit, Yo Yo Honey Singh	05:28
3.	"Po Po Po"	Vikas Bhalla, Aman Trikha, Himesh Reshammiya	04:32
4.	"Tu Kamaal Di Kudi"	Vinit Singh, Mamta Sharma	05:16
5.	"Bichdann"	Rahat Fateh Ali Khan	05:21
6.	"Yeh Jo Halki Halki Khumariya"	Rahat Fateh Ali Khan	05:31
7.	"Kabhi Kabhi Mere Dil Mein Ye Sawaal Aata Hai" (Funk)	Ajay Devgn	01:06
8.	"Son of Sardaar" (Remix)	Aman Trikha, Himesh Reshammiya	03:31
9.	"Rani Tu Mein Raja" (Remix)	Aman Trikha, Himesh Reshammiya	02:15
10.	"Kabhi Kabhi Mere Dil Mein Ye Sawaal" (Trance)	Ajay Devgan	02:15
11.	"Bichdann" (Reprise)	Rahat Fateh Ali Khan	02:11
Total length:			47:45

=== Soundtrack reception ===
Professional ratings
Review scores
Source	Rating
IBNLive (IANS)	3/5 stars
Joginder Tuteja (Bollywood Hungama)	3.5/5 stars

The album received mixed to positive reviews. Joginder Tuteja of Bollywood Hungama gave the album 3.5 out of 5 stars and stated that "Son of Sardaar lives up to its promise of a high-on-energy soundtrack with not many dull moments in its 50-odd minutes duration. " IBNLive gave it 3 out of 5 stars and said, "The album is woven around the theme of the film and manages to justify it well, although the sound gets a bit monotonous at times."

== Release ==
Son of Sardaar released in 2,000 screens in India and 350 screens overseas. Son of Sardaar got 300 more screens in its second week.

Two weeks before Diwali, Ajay Devgn FFilms sent an intimation notice to Yash Raj Films through their lawyer at the Competition Commission of India. The notice accused Yash Raj Films of monopolistic business practices and stated that they used "their dominant position in the Bollywood film market" to secure many high quality single-screens for their release Jab Tak Hai Jaan.

Yash Raj Films responded by saying that they were shocked and questioned Devgn's motives. The studio dismissed Devgn's claim that high-quality single-screens were unavailable by pointing out that they had only booked 1,500 single-screens for Jab Tak Hai Jaan out of the 10,500 available in India. The studio added that Ajay could have changed the release of his film as Yash Chopra announced on 27 June 2011 Jab Tak Hai Jaan would come out on Diwali 2012. Ajay announced the date of Son of Sardaar on 29 May 2012 and finalised distribution deals on 4 October 2012. He had a year to avoid a simultaneous release. Lastly, Yash Raj Films stated it was unfair to say they were in a dominant position. The studio only released a handful of films in 2012 while the makers of Son of Sardaar, Viacom 18 and Eros International, released dozens the same year.

After the statement made by Yash Raj Films, Ajay Devgn responded by saying he only managed to book 600 single-screens for Son of Sardaar and would take legal action if not allotted more. He denied having anything against Shahrukh Khan and said that distributors cannot be allowed to enter into an arrangement which adversely affects competition. Yash Raj Films entered into a tie-in arrangement with exhibitors that made it compulsory for them to show an untitled Yash Chopra film on Diwali and keep it in cinemas for at least two weeks thereafter. Devgn claimed that this violated provisions of the 2002 Indian Competition Act. Senior film critic Vinod Mirani said that YRF's move of blocking single screens may not help much. "Single screens watchers will have more affinity towards an action film such as SOS. Moreover, JTHJ's length and the fact that music has still not picked up, will not go down well with the movie goers." The Competition Commission dismissed the case against Yash Raj Films on 6 November 2012. Ajay Devgn has appealed to Competition Appellate Tribunal after rejection of petition against Yash Raj Films. The Competition Appellate tribunal bench headed by chairman Justice V. S. Sirpurkar refused Devgn's stay against Jab Tak Hai Jaan but stated that the case against Yash Raj Films will be reviewed again. Both films were released on 13 November 2012.

== Reception ==
=== Critical reception ===
Son of Sardaar received mixed reviews. Taran Adarsh of Bollywood Hungama gave it a score of 4 out of 5 stars and said "Son of Sardaar is for lovers of hardcore masala movies. If you liked Wanted, Dabangg and Rowdy Rathore, chances are you will relish Son of Sardaar as well. The North Indian audiences in particular and those residing abroad will be simply delighted by this chatpata, masaledaar fare." Gayatri Sankar of Zee News gave it 3.5 out of 5 stars while commenting "Certain portions are a bit of a drag, but the comic sequences will make up for the monotony. The cast has put up a good show. Overall, SOS is worth a watch, a complete family entertainer." Rediff gave 3 out of 5 and stated Son of Sardaar has a lot for the masses but it lacks a good story. Filmfare gave 3 out of 5 stars and stated "Comedy is more than just gags and slapstick. Sadly SOS gets it wrong." Rajeev Masand of CNN-IBN gave 2.5 out of 5 stars and stated Son of Sardaar "is only sporadically entertaining, and peddles the same tired stereotypes of Punjab and Sikhs. A cameo by Salman Khan, sadly, doesn't make up for the film's many flaws." Hindustan Times gave the film 2.5 out of 5 stars, describing it as "exhausting, painfully loud and way too long, with too few laughs", while the Telegraph stated that it was "run-of-the-mill", but that it could be a "guilty pleasure" for some viewers. Like the Hindustan Times, IBNLive gave the movie 2.5 out of 5, with a slightly lower grade coming from Saibal Chatterjee of NDTV, who rated the film 2 out 5, stated that it was "A tangled mess that has no way of working its way around the sloppy screenplay." The Hindu stated that there's nothing more torturous than watching an unfunny film that's trying so hard to be funny.

=== Box office ===
==== India ====
Son of Sardaar had opening of around 70% on average at multiplexes, especially in North India. The single screens opening was similar. It earned around ₹10.7 crore (US$1.1 million) on its opening day. It shows very good growth of 70% with a collection of around ₹16 crore (US$1.7 million) net on its second day. It netted ₹39 crore (US$4.0 million) nett in its first three-day weekend. Son of Sardaar net grossed ₹51 crore (US$5.3 million) in first five days of release. The film held up well with a collection of ₹57.9 crore (US$6.0 million) in its extended week of six days. The movie brought its extended first-week collection to ₹83 crore (US$8.6 million) nett.

After its first week, the film continued its successful run and collected ₹83 crore (US$8.6 million) nett in ten days. Son of Sardaar had netted ₹80 crore (US$8.3 million) after its second weekend. Son of Sardaar dropped in week two, collecting around ₹15.2 crore (US$1.6 million) net. The film netted a total of ₹105 crore (US$11 million) in four weeks. Son of Sardaar has distributor share of 75 crore.

==== Overseas ====
Son of Sardaar grossed $2 million in seven days. Son of Sardaar did a business of around $3 million overseas, which BoxofficeIndia.com called it "Hit".

=== Sequel ===
A sequel titled Son of Sardaar 2 released on 1 August 2025
