= Qantab =

- Village

- Location in Oman
- Coordinates: 23°34′N 58°38′E
- Country: Oman
- Governorate: Muscat Governorate
- Time zone: UTC+4 (Oman Standard Time)

Qantab is a village in Muscat, in northeastern Oman.

The Qantab beach located here is a popular tourist destination.

The Jewel of Muscat, a replica of a ninth century merchant sailing vessel (dhow), was built at the traditional ship-building yard at Qantab.
