= Barr Al Jissah Resort & Spa =

Barr Al Jissah Resort
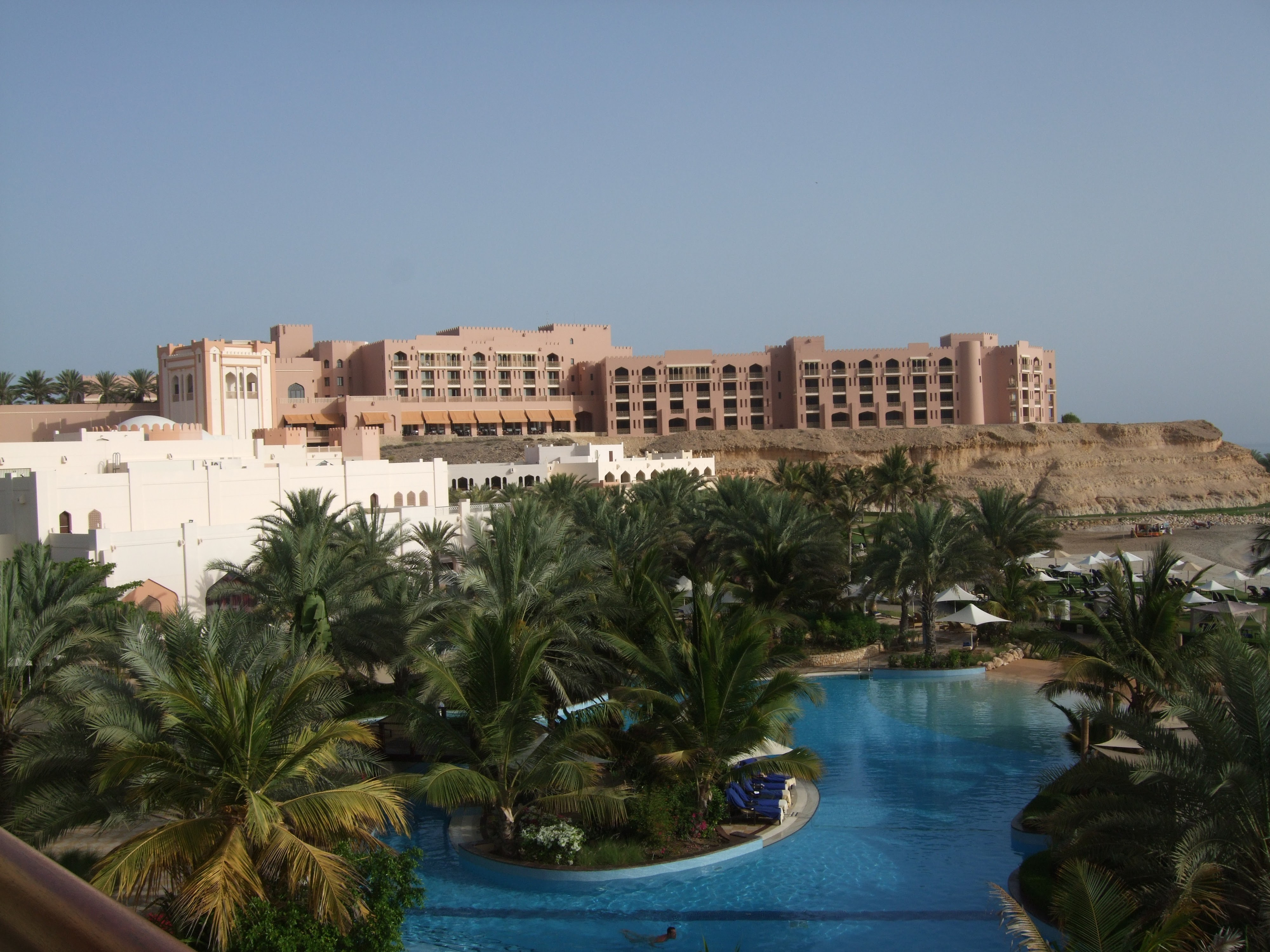
- The Barr Al Jissah complex in Muscat, Oman

General information
- Location: Muscat, Oman
- Coordinates: 23.551°N 58.660°E
- Opening: 2006
- Operator: Hilton Worldwide (since 2026)

Design and construction
- Developer: The Zubair Corporation

Other information
- Number of rooms: 680 (combined)
- Number of restaurants: 15

Barr Al Jissah Resort is a luxury waterfront resort complex located in Muscat, Oman. Set against the backdrop of the Hajar Mountains and the Gulf of Oman, the complex consists of three distinct hotel properties. From its opening in 2006 until December 2025, it was managed by Shangri-La Hotels and Resorts. As of January 1, 2026, management was transferred to Hilton Worldwide, and the properties were rebranded under the Hilton, DoubleTree, and Waldorf Astoria portfolios.

== History ==
The resort was developed by the Zubair Corporation and opened in 2006 as "Shangri-La's Barr Al Jissah Resort & Spa." For twenty years, it operated as a single destination comprising three hotels: Al Waha ("The Oasis"), Al Bandar ("The Town"), and Al Husn ("The Castle").

In late 2025, the owner announced that the 20-year management agreement with Shangri-La would conclude to allow for a multi-brand strategy under Hilton. The transition, effective January 1, 2026, was cited as a major expansion of Hilton's footprint in the Sultanate, doubling its presence from three to six hotels in support of the Oman Vision 2040 tourism goals.

== Properties ==
Under Hilton management, the resort is operated as three distinct entities:

=== DoubleTree by Hilton Muscat Al Waha ===
Al Waha is the largest of the three hotels with 302 guest rooms. Designed to resemble a traditional Omani village, it is positioned as the complex's family-oriented resort. It features multiple swimming pools and a dedicated kids' club.

=== Hilton Muscat Al Bandar ===
Al Bandar serves as the business and lifestyle hub of the complex with 198 rooms. It contains the resort's primary meeting and event infrastructure, including a ballroom with a capacity for 850 guests and a dedicated amphitheater.

=== Al Husn Hotel Muscat (Waldorf Astoria Rebrand) ===
Al Husn is a 180-room clifftop property originally established as an adults-only retreat. Following its transition to Hilton in 2026, the property is scheduled for extensive renovations. It is slated to be officially rebranded as the Waldorf Astoria Muscat Al Husn in 2027, which will mark the debut of the Waldorf Astoria brand in Oman.

== Awards ==
Oman Today Best Restaurant Awards named Shangri-La's Barr Al Jissah Resort & Spa as finalist in the Ambience and Service categories in 2011.
