= Rowdy Rathore =

2012 Indian film by Prabhu Deva

- Theatrical release poster
- Directed by: Prabhu Deva
- Written by: Shiraz Ahmed
- Story by: V. Vijayendra Prasad
- Based on: Vikramarkudu by S. S. Rajamouli
- Produced by: Sanjay Leela Bhansali; Ronnie Screwvala
- Starring: Akshay Kumar; Sonakshi Sinha; Nassar
- Cinematography: Santosh Thundiyil
- Edited by: Sanjay Sankla
- Music by: Songs: Sajid–Wajid; Background Score: Sandeep Chowta
- Production companies: UTV Motion Pictures; Bhansali Productions
- Distributed by: UTV Motion Pictures
- Release date: 1 June 2012 (India)
- Running time: 143 minutes
- Country: India
- Language: Hindi
- Budget: ₹ 60 crore
- Box office: ₹ 203.39 crore

Rowdy Rathore is a 2012 Indian Hindi-language action film directed by Prabhu Deva and produced by Sanjay Leela Bhansali and Ronnie Screwvala under the UTV Motion Pictures and Bhansali Productions banners. A remake of the 2006 Telugu film Vikramarkudu, based on an original story written by V. Vijayendra Prasad, it stars Akshay Kumar in a dual role of a brave police officer and a thief. The film also features Sonakshi Sinha, Gurdeep Kohli, Yashpal Sharma and Paresh Ganatra in supporting roles, while Nassar portrays the main antagonist. In the film, Vikram Rathore, a brave and honest police officer is killed by a gangster named Baapji. But his team replaces him with Shiva, a thief who happens to be his look-alike, to avenge his death.

Filmed primarily in Mumbai and Hampi on a budget of ₹ 60 crore, Rowdy Rathore was released worldwide on 1 June 2012. Its music was composed by Sajid–Wajid. It opened to mixed reviews from critics and became a blockbuster at the domestic and worldwide box office. Good word-of-mouth had helped it to take its distributor share to ₹740 million (US$7.7 million) in India at the end of its run. It has emerged one of the biggest grosser ever in Mumbai circuit and grossed ₹515.5 million (US$5.4 million) in seven weeks. The film grossed over ₹203.39 crore (US$21 million) becoming one of the highest-grossing Indian films.

== Plot ==
Shiva is a small-time thief in Mumbai, who, one day, attends a wedding where he falls in love with Paro from Patna. He tells her the truth about his profession and resolves to give up crime because he loves Paro dearly. Before giving her commitment to give up crime, he decides to commit a large robbery along with his con-friend 2G, which would enable him to earn a lot of money to live an easy life. He "tricks" a woman at a railway station and flees with a trunk. This leads Shiva to Chinki, a little girl who was in the trunk instead of the wealth he thought was there. Chinki believes that he is her father. Puzzled, he is forced to keep Chinki with him as an honest police officer, Vishal Sharma, keeps his eye on him.

Shiva fears Paro will catch him with Chinki, and he will lose her forever. He finds a photo of Chinki and her father, who looks exactly like Shiva, thus realizing why Chinki thinks Shiva is her father. Eventually, it is revealed that Chinki's father is ASP Vikram Rathore, a brave, disciplined, and respected police officer whom criminals fear. While chasing a goon to find his daughter, Vikram gets hit by an auto, and his brain endures severe trauma. The doctor tells him that the brain injury is serious enough to put his life in danger.

After a few days, Shiva gets fed up with Chinki and breaks the tape recorder she uses to listen to her late mother's voice. The next morning, he learns that her mother died. Feeling guilty, he fixes the recorder and becomes fond of Chinki, taking care of her. Unfortunately, Paro sees this and believes he has a daughter that he hid from her, and she leaves for Patna, heartbroken. Soon, the goons who are after Vikram see Shiva. Thinking he is Vikram, they start chasing him. Shiva and Chinki flee for their lives and encounter the woman from the railway station, who tells Shiva to run. Enraged, Shiva is soon surrounded by the goons, but Vikram saves him and defeats the goons, despite getting severely injured. At the hospital, Shiva realizes that the railway station woman is, in fact, a real police officer, Inspector Razia Khan. The officers tell Shiva that the man who looks like him is Vikram and narrate the whole incident.

Six months ago, Vikram traveled to a village called Devgarh as the new ASP. There, a goon called Baapji and his son Munna caused trouble, torturing and extorting money from the villagers. Vikram immediately arrested Munna by force for abducting Vishal's wife, but he was released because of Baapji's political influence. Baapji arranged a party celebrating Munna's release. At the party, Munna humiliated the police officers and made them pull their pants down. Vikram, being the next target, moved back to the balcony, where Munna slipped off and died in the process. The next day, during a Ramlila event, Vikram was attacked by Baapji's brother Titla, where he was stabbed in the back and shot in the head while saving a village child. He was then assumed to be dead. While the police officers were getting ready to bury him, he started breathing, having survived. Everybody promised not to disclose this to anyone. The officers then took Vikram to Mumbai for treatment.

After Shiva hears the whole story, the doctors say that Vikram doesn't have much time left. Before dying, Vikram requests Shiva to take care of Chinki. Shiva promises and says that Chinki is now his daughter. Shiva, vowing to avenge Vikram's death, takes on Vikram's identity and goes to Devgarh with Chinki to take revenge. Paro finds out the truth and soon reconciles with him. Shiva sets Baapji's liquor factory on fire, distributes the grains and money back to the villagers, and has the police officers torture Baapji and his men in jail. Following a heavy climax, Shiva eventually kills Baapji and Titla and rescues Paro and Chinki after they are kidnapped by Baapji and Titla. The story ends with Devgarh now falling back into safe hands and Shiva, Paro, and 2G leaving on a train with Chinki, presumably back to Mumbai.

== Cast ==
- Akshay Kumar in a dual role as ASP Vikram Rathore IPS and Shiva
- Sonakshi Sinha as Paro, Shiva's love interest
- Nassar as Baapji, Titla's elder brother
- Ananya Nayak as Chinki, Vikram's daughter and Shiva's adoptive daughter
- Paresh Ganatra as 2G, Shiva's friend
- Supreeth Reddy as Titla, Baapji's brother
- Yashpal Sharma as Inspector Vishal Sharma
- Jaswinder Gardner as Nirmala Sharma, Vishal's wife
- Saniya Anklesaria as Vishal's daughter
- Meet Mukhi as Vishal's son
- Raj Arjun as Jagdish, Vikram's sworn brother
- Gurdeep Kohli as Inspector Razia Khan
- Mushtaq Khan as Baapji's brother-in-law
- Amit Tiwari as Munna, Baapji's son
- Anant Jog as Home Minister of Bihar
- Darshan Jariwala as DGP Suraj Prakash Sharma IPS
- Shireesh Sharma as Paro's father
- Shruti Bapna as Paro's friend in the song "Chammak Challo"
- Ashok Samarth as Babu
- Pooja Rawal as Mrs. Rathore (photo archive)

=== Special appearances ===
- Vijay as himself in the song "Chinta Ta Ta Chita Chita"
- Prabhu Deva as himself in the song "Chinta Ta Ta Chita Chita"
- Kareena Kapoor as herself in the song "Chinta Ta Ta Chita Chita"
- Mumaith Khan as item number in the song "Aa Re Pritam Pyare"
- Maryam Zakaria as item number in the song "Aa Re Pritam Pyare"
- Shakti Mohan as item number in the song "Aa Re Pritam Pyare"

== Production ==
=== Casting ===
Akshay Kumar learnt a special combat karate technique for his character role in the film. Kumar reported that he had accepted the role in Rowdy Rathore since his son loves to watch him in action roles. Sanjay Leela Bhansali teamed up with designer Shabinaa Khan to co-produce Rowdy Rathore, which is his first film with Akshay Kumar. It is also Bhansali's second film as a producer and his first in the action genre. Maryam Zakaria was selected to perform an item number.

Thalapathy Vijay, Kareena Kapoor and Prabhu Deva made a friendly appearance in the video for "Chinta Ta" song.

=== Filming ===
The police denied permission for the shooting of Rowdy Rathore at the World Heritage Site Hampi, following protests from local activists and artists. The film unit consisting of director Prabhu Deva, actors Akshay Kumar, Sonakshi Sinha, and 50 other dancers left the site on Tuesday, authorities issued directions to the crew to stop shooting with immediate effect following violations of ASI conservation rules and for tranquillity. Local people and artists opposed the shooting of a song sequence, featuring Akshay and Sonakshi, along with many dancers, scheduled to be shot at several heritage sites in Karnataka, including the Vijaya Vittala temple, Lotus Mahal, Maha Navami Dibba and other historic places in the 15th century capital of the Vijayanagara Empire. The movie had the 50 crore insurance for Akshay Kumar.

== Marketing ==
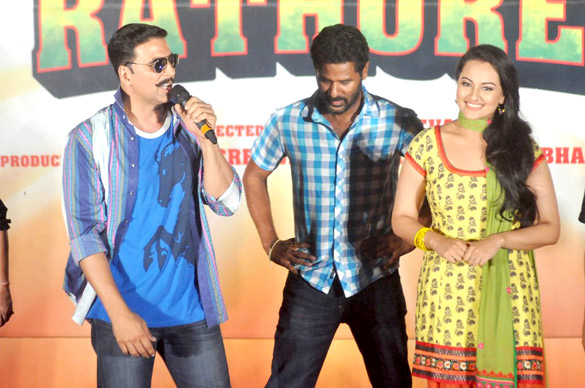
Akshay Kumar, Sonakshi Sinha, and Prabhudeva at the first-look launch of Rowdy Rathore

UTV tied up with radio channel Red FM for organizing a contest titled "Rowdy Hunt" to look for social do-gooders and others who work towards social betterment – winners of the contest will accompany star Akshay Kumar to promote the film during his tours. The hunt has taken place in Ahmedabad, Hyderabad, Jaipur, Lucknow, Mumbai and New Delhi, where callers were invited to share their grievances and tackle the culprit on a public platform in true "Rowdy" style. The RJ/host will then select five rowdies in each city based on a "Rowdy Meter" who will then comprise Akshay Kumar's Rowdy Gang in a particular city.

The cast and crew went to Dubai as part of the promotional tour. Sonakshi Sinha promoted the film on Big FM. On 26 May 2012, she promoted the film on Dance India Dance Lil' Masters on Zee Tv, and the Zee Network are giving out free cinema tickets to people who are correct in the Safari Cinema. Wardrobe company Dollar Industries has tied up with the producers to promote their products with the film.

UTV Indiagames also released a mobile video game based on the film.

== Music ==
The soundtrack is composed by Sajid–Wajid and was released on 2 May 2012. The line Chinta Ta Ta Ta and part of its music has been borrowed from the original song of its Telugu version, which was confirmed by Wajid. Kumar Sanu has sung a song for this film, making his comeback after four years. The song "Aa Re Pritam Pyaare" used the hook tune from the Tamil song "Vaadi Vaadi Naattu Katta" from Alli Thandha Vaanam.

== Release ==
The film released worldwide on 1 June 2012. Rowdy Rathore was released in 2,300 screens in India and around 400 screens overseas.

=== Home media ===
The film is available on JioHotstar, from November 4, 2025, at 11 PM.

== Reception ==
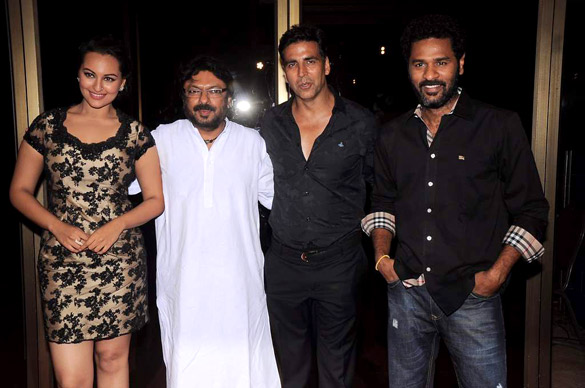
Sonakshi Sinha, Bansali, Akshay Kumar and Prabhu Deva during the success bash

Rowdy Rathore received mixed reviews from critics. Taran Adarsh of Bollywood Hungama gave the film 4 stars, saying, "If you savor typical masaledaar fares, this one should be on your have-to-watch listing for certain. Dhamaal entertainer!" DNA India gave 3 stars out of 5 and said, "Rowdy is Akshay's return to action. And how! The actor takes charge of the film from the first scene and holds it tight all through. To put it simply, the film is to Akshay what Wanted was for Salman!" Srijana Mitra Das for The Times of India gave the film 3 stars of 5, and said, "Fans will love Akshay's mooch-twirling masala-act but be ready for hardcore action too — some pretty gruesome."

Shomini Sen from Zee News also gave 3 stars out of 5 and said, "The premise of the film may be good, but the treatment is that of a typical south Indian pot boiler." Based on 21 reviews, review aggregate site desimartini.com gave the verdict, "Although the movie doesn't do complete justice to the original Telugu blockbuster, it does have some funny dialogues and action sequences that will make you want to whistle! Rowdy Rathore is a one time watch." The site's average audience rating is 3/5.

Saibal Chatterjee of NDTV gave the film 2 stars out of 5, saying, "Rowdy Rathore plays out pretty much like a comic-book fantasy rendered in the form of a live-action film. Go for it if you must, but don't expect the earth from it." Blessy Chettiar of DNA India gave the film 2 stars out of 5, concluding, "Akshay's me-too is fun while it lasts. Watch it for him, lest he feels bad for jumping on the South remake bandwagon too late to get any attention." Raja Sen of Rediff.com too gave the film 2 stars out of 5, and commented, "It can hardly be called a film, but ah well. Watch it if only to remind yourself of old Khiladi flicks...."

Trisha Gupta of Firstpost reviewed "Rowdy Rathore is a mess of maal, masala and moustache while it has neither the wit nor the charm needed to craft a real send-up". Mayank Shekhar, on his website theW14.com, says "While you can't tell one Akshay Kumar from the other in this film, you obviously can't tell this film from any other action hit from recent or distant past either. That's what a dead formula film is supposed to be. Going by box-office figures, the producers, Sanjay Leela Bhansali and UTV, are certain this is what the audiences currently desire. They probably do. Is this what they deserve? I'm not sure. Anupama Chopra of Hindustan Times gave the film 1 out of 5 stars and said, "The film is one more in the line of movies – many of which are remakes from the south – that value masala above all else. But Dabangg and even Wanted, the latter of which was also directed by Prabhu Deva, were far more cohesive and compelling. Rowdy Rathore is pure noise. Only the brave should venture in." Rajeev Masand of CNN-IBN gave 1 stars out of 5, commenting "At 2 hours and 20 minutes, Rowdy Rathore is excruciatingly long. The one-liners have little impact and make no sense, and the action has a been-there-seen-that feel to it. A few jokes work because Akshay Kumar does goofy well, but this film doesn't have half the energy of Prabhudeva's last directorial outing in Hindi, the Salman Khan starrer Wanted."

=== Box office ===
Rowdy Rathore had been the most appreciated film since Dabangg released in 2010. It had seen the best word of mouth since Dabangg which is reflected in trending of its first three-week run. Good word-of-mouth had helped it to take its distributor share to ₹740 million (US$7.7 million) in India at the end of its run. Rowdy Rathore has emerged one of the biggest grosser ever in Mumbai circuit and grossed ₹515.5 million (US$5.4 million) in seven weeks. The film grossed over ₹203.39 crore (US$21 million) and became one of the highest grossing Hindi films of that year.

==== India ====
The film took a bumper opening at single screens at an occupancy of around 95%–100%. It collected around ₹150.6 million (US$1.6 million) nett domestic in the opening day. Rowdy Rathore had a good opening weekend with collection of ₹475.0 million (US$4.9 million). The film further collected ₹91.0 million (US$940,000) on Monday and ₹80 million (US$830,000) on Tuesday. Rowdy Rathore had collected around ₹770 million (US$8.0 million) nett plus in its first week and this makes it the second highest collections ever for a regular Friday-Thursday week behind Dabangg, which collected ₹810 million (US$8.4 million) nett. The collections of Rowdy Rathore were around ₹50 million (US$520,000) nett on its 8th day, which was better than the new release Shanghai on its first week. The film collected a huge ₹335.0 million (US$3.5 million) nett in its second week taking the two-week business to ₹1,095.0 million (US$11 million) nett. It was steady on its third week as it collected around ₹21.0 million (US$220,000) nett on its third Friday despite being new release, Ferrari Ki Sawaari. It had collected ₹150 million (US$1.6 million) nett in third week, ₹46.1 million (US$480,000) in fourth week and ₹18.4 million (US$190,000) nett in fifth week thus taken its five weeks total to ₹1,304.5 million (US$14 million). The film eventually made ₹1.33 billion (US$14 million) in India.

==== Other territories ====
Rowdy Rathore had collected around ₹182.0 million (US$1.9 million) overseas in ten days. Collections had been considered average" in most circuits while UAE was the best. Rowdy Rathore has finished around ₹192.0 million (US$2.0 million) and is an average fare overseas.

== See also ==
- List of highest-grossing Bollywood films
