= Ek Do Teen (song) =

- Official song cover

Song by Shreya Ghoshal (Rap by Parry G)

from the album Baaghi 2
- Language: Hindi
- Released: 19 March 2018
- Genre: Feature film soundtrack, EDM, pop-folk
- Length: 4:04
- Label: T-Series
- Composers: Laxmikant–Pyarelal (Recreated by Sandeep Shirodkar)
- Lyricist: Javed Akhtar
- Producer: Sajid Nadiadwala

Baaghi 2 track listing
- 1. "Mundiyan"; 2. "O Saathi"; 3. "Lo Safar"; 4. "Ek Do Teen"; 5. "Soniye Dil Nayi"; 6. "Get Ready To Fight Again"

Music video
- "Ek Do Teen" on YouTube

"Ek Do Teen" (transl. One, Two, Three) is a Hindi song from the 2018 film Baaghi 2. The song was a remake of the original song of the same name from the film Tezaab which was sung by Alka Yagnik and Amit Kumar and featured Madhuri Dixit. The song features Jacqueline Fernandez and Tiger Shroff and is voiced by Shreya Ghoshal. Ghoshal had also recreated a version of the same song with DJ Aqeel for the Ameesha Patel starrer Desi Magic. The film was released on 30 March 2018.

== Development ==
The song was recorded, mixed and mastered by Eric Pillai - Future Sound Of Bombay in Mumbai. The song is arranged and programmed by Prasad Sashte.

== Music video ==
The song was choreographed by Ganesh Acharya, who was a background dancer in the older version of the song released in 1988. According to Jacqueline, she had grown up listening to "Ek Do Teen" and it was a dream come true moment for her to perform on the recreated song in Baaghi 2. Jacqueline added that she felt blessed to have got the opportunity to pay a tribute to Madhuri.

== Release ==
A teaser of the song was released on 16 March 2018. The official song was released on the T-Series's YouTube channel on 19 March 2018. The full music album was released on 20 March 2018 by T-Series.

== Reception ==
The song received mixed reviews from various critics and fans. However the director said that they were ready for the criticism stating, "From the moment we zeroed down on the song Ek Do Teen, we were ready for the criticism." Writing for NDTV, Nilanjana Basu said, "Can't, just can't stop watching over and over Jacqueline Fernandez's latke jhatke in the new version of Ek Do Teen for Baaghi 2. The song is the perfect remedy for our Monday morning blues and with Jacqueline Fernandez dancing like that, now, we know what setting the stage on fire actually is!" She also added, "Ek Do Teen has all the ingredients of what is referred to as a dance number - Jacqueline in flashy outfits, a catchy remixed tune that runs along the song, superwoman dance moves and the humour element."

== Chart performance ==
The song debuted on Mirchi Music Top 20 countdown on 31 March 2018. It stayed on the chart for 8 weeks till 1 June 2018.

Year	Chart	Peak Position	Time Span on Chart	Ref.
2018	Mirchi Music Top 20 Countdown	9	8 weeks	
