= Desi Magic =

- Directed by: Mehul Atha
- Written by: Ameet Mehta
- Produced by: Ameesha Patel; Kuunal Goomer
- Starring: Ameesha Patel; Esha Gupta; Sahil Shroff; Zayed Khan
- Cinematography: Aseem Bajaj
- Edited by: Asif Ali Shaikh
- Music by: DJ Aqeel; Lalit Pandit
- Production company: Ameesha Patel Productions
- Country: India
- Language: Hindi

Desi Magic is an unreleased Indian romantic comedy film, directed by Mehul Atha and produced by Ameesha Patel and Kuunal Goomer under the banner of Ameesha Patel Productions. It stars actors Ameesha Patel, Zayed Khan and Sahil Shroff in the lead roles. Esha Gupta is a cameo appearance. The film has been in post production since 2014 and since 2015 its release was delayed.

== Plot ==
Sonia Saxena (Ameesha Patel), a recently known fashion designer, who is about to launch her new clothing line "Desi Magic", seems to have the perfect life. But things change when she meets Kunal Grewal (Zayed Khan), who decides to present his best friend Sahil Mehra (Sahil Shroff). All goes well until Sahil also decides to present his girlfriend Mahi Deol (Esha Gupta).

== Cast ==
- Ameesha Patel as Sonia Saxena / Mahi deol (fake name)
- Esha Gupta as Mahi deol (real name)
- Zayed Khan as Kunal Grewal
- Sahil Shroff as Sahil Mehra
- Randhir Kapoor
- Lillete Dubey
- Ravi Kishan
- Rajat Rawail

== Production ==
=== Development ===
Actress Ameesha Patel will be making her debut as a film producer with this film under her production house, Ameesha Patel Productions. According to her, creating a production house was the idea of her co-producer Kuunal Goomer, who persuaded her to set up a company with him which aimed at making good films.

=== Casting ===
This is the first time that Patel will be doing a double role for a film. Regarding her character, she told in an interview that in this film, she will be playing two characters of totally opposite nature.

=== Filming ===
Principal photography began in August 2013 and the film has been shot in Mumbai and Punjab. The film was also shot in Venice, Budapest and Dubai. The film's release has been pushed back several times, due to delay in the shooting schedules.

The filming is reported as completed on 19 January 2019.

== Soundtrack ==
Desi Magic

Soundtrack album by DJ Aqeel, Lalit Pandit
- Genre: Feature film soundtrack

Lalit Pandit chronology
Besharam (2013)	Desi Magic (TBA)

The film introduces DJ Aqeel as a film score composer. He has recreated the song Ek Do Teen. The new track has been voiced by Shreya Ghoshal. However, Shreya has later also rendered a new version of the same song for the movie Baaghi 2 released in 2018. Apart from that, Ghoshal has also sung a slow number composed by Lalit Pandit.
