= Cheluva =

- Directed by: V. Ravichandran
- Written by: B. Suresh [Dialogues]
- Screenplay by: E. V. V. Sathyanarayana
- Story by: E. V. V. Sathyanarayana
- Based on: Hello Brother by E. V. V. Satyanarayana
- Produced by: S. Ramesh
- Starring: V. Ravichandran; Meena; Gautami
- Cinematography: G. S. V. Seetharam
- Edited by: Suresh Urs
- Music by: Hamsalekha
- Production company: Mahalakshmi Pictures
- Release date: 30 September 1997
- Running time: 166 minutes
- Country: India
- Language: Kannada

Cheluva is a 1997 Kannada comedy-drama film directed and enacted by V. Ravichandran in dual roles. The rest of the cast includes Meena, Gautami and Tiger Prabhakar among others. The film is a remake of Telugu film Hello Brother which itself was loosely based on the Hong Kong action comedy Twin Dragons (1992) starring Jackie Chan.

The film featured an original score and soundtrack composed and written by Hamsalekha and was produced by S. Ramesh for Mahalakshmi Pictures banner.

== Plot ==
Cheluva and Vijay, two twin brothers, are separated in their childhood by Raghuram, a well-known criminal. Cheluva is left on the streets by Raghuram and becomes a small-time criminal. Vijay was brought up under his parents' guidance and is a well-known engineer. After several years, Cheluva has come face to face with his family. The rest of the film deals with the confusion the family face due to the lookalikes of Cheluva and Vijay.

== Cast ==
- V. Ravichandran in a dual role as
  - Cheluva
  - Vijay, Cheluva's twin
- Meena as Meena
- Gautami as Moha
- Tiger Prabhakar as Police Officer Prathap
- Kazan Khan as Kodanda
- Mukhyamantri Chandru as Chandru, a sidekick of Kodanda
- Srinivasa Murthy as Meena's father
- Umashree as lady PC
- Bank Janardhan as Bhandlee Bhandari
- Doddanna as Head PC Narayanappa
- Tennis Krishna as TK
- B. V. Radha as Akhilandeshwari, Moha's mother
- Sumithra
- Mahesh Anand as Raghuram, Kodanda's father
- Bhavyasri Rai
- Padma Vasanthi
- Sundar Raj
- Pramila Joshai
- Ponnambalam as a goon
- Vijay Kashi
- Bank Suresh
- Stunt Siddu
- Shiva Kumar
- Dingri Nagaraj
- Sarigama Viji
- M. D. Kaushik

== Soundtrack ==
The music was composed and written by Hamsalekha.

Track listing
No.	Title	Singer(s)	Length
1.	"Cheluvayya Cheluvayya"	S. P. Balasubrahmanyam, K. S. Chithra
2.	"Parapancha Ee Parapancha"	Mano, K. S. Chithra
3.	"Thattharo Thattha"	L. N. Shastry, L. N. Vijayalakshmi
4.	"Hanga Nodabeda Henne"	Mano
5.	"O Pranasakhi"	Mano, K. S. Chithra
6.	"Oye Oye"	Mano, K. S. Chithra
7.	"Danthada Gombe"	Mano, Latha Hamsalekha

== See also ==
- Twin telepathy
