= Judwaa =

1997 Indian film by David Dhawan

- Theatrical release poster
- Directed by: David Dhawan
- Written by: Rumi Jaffery
- Story by: E. V. V. Satyanarayana
- Based on: Hello Brother by E. V. V. Satyanarayana
- Produced by: Sajid Nadiadwala
- Starring: Salman Khan; Karisma Kapoor; Rambha; Anupam Kher; Shakti Kapoor
- Cinematography: W. B. Rao
- Music by: Anu Malik; Koti (Background score)
- Distributed by: Nadiadwala Grandson Entertainment
- Release date: 7 February 1997
- Running time: 136 minutes
- Country: India
- Language: Hindi
- Budget: ₹6.25 crore
- Box office: ₹24.28 crore

Judwaa (transl. Twins) is a 1997 Indian Hindi-language action comedy film, directed by David Dhawan, produced by Sajid Nadiadwala and starring Salman Khan, Karisma Kapoor and Rambha with Kader Khan, Dalip Tahil, Shakti Kapoor, Deepak Shirke, Anupam Kher, Satish Shah and Mukesh Rishi in supporting roles. It is a remake of the Telugu film Hello Brother (1994), which in turn is inspired from the Hong Kong action comedy film Twin Dragons (1992) starring Jackie Chan, which itself is a remake of Ranjit Mallick's Bengali film Shathe Shathyang (1982).

It was " SUPER-HIT " at BoxOffice.

== Plot ==
Jayantilal "Ratan" Pandey is a ruthless criminal. ACP Sanjay Path "S. P." Malhotra arrests him. Ratan wounds himself and is taken to the hospital, where ACP Malhotra is waiting for his wife Geeta Malhotra, who is in labor. She gives birth to twins. The doctor explains that both babies have a reflection mentality, which means that "what happens with one baby might be felt and reflected by another," depending on the proximity between them. Ratan escapes and takes one of the twins with him, injuring Geeta. ACP Malhotra chases after him. Unable to find his son, shoots a fleeing Ratan in an attempt to stop him. The kid grows up as Raja and finds a girl, Neelam whom he adopts as his sister. He finds another orphan, Rangeela Prakash and becomes his friend. Together they take care of the girl and become small-time thieves.

On the other hand, Geeta goes into depression and gets paralyzed. ACP Malhotra takes her to the US for her treatment, where the other twin named Prem Malhotra is brought up. He comes to India as a rock star for a show. He is received by Kishan Sharma, who is his father's friend and wishes to marry his daughter Mala Sharma to him. But Mala is in love with Raja. At the airport, Prem finds Roopa Batwani, daughter of Sundari Batwani, the organizer of his public shows. Prem falls in love with Roopa. Tony, Sundari's nephew, also wishes to marry Roopa. Meanwhile, Mala misunderstands Prem for Raja and starts flirting with him. One day, Raja and Prem see each other in a restaurant and find out that they are identical, which leads to hilarious misunderstandings.

Meanwhile, Raja's sister Neelam sees local goon Ratanlal "Tiger" Pandey who is the son of Ratan, killing an Inspector on the road and becomes a vital witness of the murder in court. Enraged, Tiger assaults and threatens her to not report his crime to the police. However, as a consequence, Tiger is badly beaten up by Raja, making him more vengeful against Raja and Neelam. To exact his revenge, he sends his henchman named Tommy to be the groom of Neelam but Raja and Rangeela find out his plan and marry Neelam to someone else. The court announces the death sentence to Tiger for the murder of the Inspector he shot earlier. Days pass, Neelam becomes pregnant, and she is admitted to a hospital for her delivery. Raja asks Prem to stay at the hospital as he is searching for money. Prem visits his father, ACP Malhotra.

At the same time, Tiger escapes from jail to kidnap Neelam and recognizes ACP Malhotra, who shot his father Ratan and finds out that Raja is his son. He blackmails Raja to get ACP Malhotra to free Neelam. Raja, who does not know that ACP Malhotra is his real father goes to his house where Geeta also comes out from the paralysis by Raja's touch, and he comes to see the truth that they are his real parents and Prem is his twin brother. Finally, Raja and Prem come together to protect their father from Tiger. Raja finds out about his and Prem's shared reflex, Nandu requests Raja to beat him so Prem would beat Tiger. And the story ends with the duo marrying their respective ladies.

== Cast ==
- Salman Khan as (dual role):
  - Raja Malhotra
    - Omkar Kapoor as young Raja Malhotra
  - Prem Malhotra
- Karisma Kapoor as Mala Sharma
- Rambha as Roopa Batwani
- Dalip Tahil as Sanjay Path "S.P." Malhotra, Raja and Prem's father
- Reema Lagoo as Geeta Malhotra, Raja and Prem's mother
- Kader Khan as Kishan Sharma, Mala's father and Sanjay's friend
- Shakti Kapoor as Rangeela Prakash, Raja's sidekick
  - Siddhanth Kapoor as young Rangeela Prakash
- Bindu as Sundari Batwani, Roopa's mother
- Anupam Kher as Inspector Vidyarthi Pratap
- Satish Shah as Hawaldar Rajesh Singh
- Mukesh Rishi as Ratanlal "Tiger" Pandey, Ratan's son
- Tiku Talsania as Sameer: Kishan's brother-in-law
- Dinesh Hingoo as a Jeweller (special appearance)
- Ram Sethi as a Waiter at Hotel (special appearance)
- Jack Gaud as Tony
- Sheetal Joshi as Neelam, Raja's adoptive sister
- Shashi Kiran as Tommy
- Kamaldeep as the Police Commissioner PP Roy
- Vikas Anand as Police Inspector Mohan, at the college
- Deepak Shirke as Jayantilal "Ratan" Pandey
- Mahavir Shah as Inspector Sharma
- Syed Khurshid
- Ishrat Ali as Tau, Ratan's brother & Tiger's uncle
- Divya Bharti in a photo tribute in the starting of the film

== Production ==
Sajid Nadiadwala planned to make a film on twins in 1996 and hired David Dhawan to direct it. Actress Tabu dubbed for actress Rambha.

== Soundtrack ==
Judwaa

Soundtrack album by Anu Malik
- Released: 7 November 1996
- Recorded: 1996
- Genre: Feature film soundtrack
- Length: 34:37
- Label: Venus Records & Tapes
- Producer: Anu Malik

Anu Malik chronology
Namak (1996)	Judwaa (1996)	Auzaar (1997)

The film's soundtrack features six songs. The music was composed by Anu Malik, with lyrics authored by Dev Kohli and Nitin Raikwar. The background score was composed by Koti.

#	Title	Singer(s)	Length
1.	"Tan Tana Tan Tan"	Abhijeet; Poornima	06:39
2.	"Oonchi Hai Building"	Poornima; Anu Malik	05:10
3.	"Duniya Mein Aaye"	Kumar Sanu; Kavita Krishnamurthy	06:02
4.	"Tu Mere Dil Mein Basja"	Kumar Sanu; Poornima	04:46
5.	"Tera Aana Tera Jaana"	Kumar Sanu; Kavita Krishnamurthy	04:53
6.	"East Aur West India Is The Best"	Anu Malik	07:04

== Box office ==
According to Box Office India, the film had a Bumper opening in 1997. The film's domestic gross was ₹28 crore ($6.607 million), equivalent to ₹225 crore (US$23 million) when adjusted for inflation. (Note: Inflation rate of 9.612 times, based on domestic nett's inflation from ₹ 13.14 crore to ₹ 126.3 crore.) Its domestic nett was ₹ 13.14 crore, equivalent to ₹126.3 crore (US$13 million) when adjusted for inflation. It was the ninth highest-grossing film of the year at the Indian box office, where it sold 13.634 million tickets. Its overseas gross was US$250,000 (₹ 89.4 lakh). Worldwide, the film grossed ₹24.284 crore ($6.857 million), is equivalent to ₹233.42 crore (US$24 million) when adjusted for inflation.

== Reboot ==
On 9 February 2016, a reboot to the film, titled Judwaa 2, was announced. The film is once again directed by David Dhawan and produced by Sajid Nadiadwala and features David's son Varun Dhawan in the leading double role. The trailer of Judwaa 2 was unveiled to audiences on 21 August 2017 and the film was released on 29 September 2017. The only cast members from the original Judwaa appearing in Judwaa 2 are Anupam Kher, albeit in a different role, and Salman Khan in a cameo appearance, while the only songs recreated from the original "Judwaa" were the famous "Oonchi Hai Building (Lift Teri Bandh Hai)" and "Tan Tana Tan Tan Tan Tara (Chalti Hai Kya 9 Se 12)".

== See also ==
- Twin telepathy
- Bhaijaan Elo Re, 2018 Bengali remake
