= Arko Pravo Mukherjee =

Indian singer

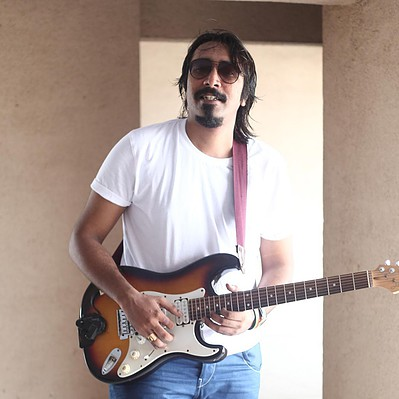
- Mukherjee in December 2015

Background information
- Born: Arko Pravo Mukherjee; 19 May 1983 (age 43); Kolkata, West Bengal, India
- Genre: Bollywood
- Occupations: Music composer; singer-songwriter
- Years active: 2012–present

Arko Pravo Mukherjee, better known by the mononym Arko, is an Indian music composer, singer, lyricist, producer, and a qualified doctor. He has created multiple tracks for various films like "Teri Mitti" (Kesari), "Nazm Nazm" (Bareilly Ki Barfi), "O Desh Mere" (BHUJ - The Pride Of India), "O Saathi" (Baaghi 2), "Tere Sang Yaara" (Rustom), "Jogi" (Shaadi Mein Zaroor Aana), "Naino Ne Bandhi" (Gold), "Allah Waariyan" (Yaariyan), "Abhi Abhi" (Jism 2), "Saathi Rey" (Kapoor & Sons), "Dariya" (Baar Baar Dekho), "Paani Wala Dance" (KKLH) and others.

== Early life ==
Arko grew up in Kolkata, where he studied at Don Bosco School, Park Circus, before pursuing and completing his medical studies at Burdwan Medical College. Mukherjee interned at Calcutta Medical College before moving in 2008 to Mumbai, to pursue a career in the Bollywood film industry as a music director and singer-songwriter.

== Filmography ==
=== Hindi filmography ===
Denotes films that have not yet been released

Year	Film Name/Album	Song	Singer(s)	Notes
2012	Jism 2	Abhi Abhi (Male)	KK	
2012	Jism 2	Yeh Jism Hai Toh Kya	Ali Azmat	
2012	Jism 2	Maula	Ali Azmat	
2012	Jism 2	Abhi Abhi (Duet 1)	KK, Shreya Ghoshal	
2012	Jism 2	Abhi Abhi (Duet 2)	KK, Akriti Kakkar	
2014	Yaariyan	Allah Waariyan	Shafqat Amanat Ali	
2014	Yaariyan	Zor Lagaake Haisha	Vishal Dadlani	
2014	Hate Story 2	Aaj Phir Tumpe Pyaar Aaya Hai	Arijit Singh, Samira Koppikar	
2014	Tamanchey	Dildara	Sonu Nigam	
2014	Tamanchey	Dildara (Reprise)	Arko	
2014	The Shaukeens	Meherbani	Jubin Nautiyal	
2015	Kuch Kuch Locha Hai	Pani Wala Dance	Ikka, Shraddha Pandit	
2015	Kuch Kuch Locha Hai	Aao Na	Ankit Tiwari, Shraddha Pandit	
2015	Bhaag Johnny	Iss Qadar Pyar Hai	Ankit Tiwari	
2015	Jazbaa	Kahaaniya	Nilofer Wani	
2015	Jazbaa	Jaane Tere Shehar	Vipin Aneja	
2016	Kapoor & Sons	Saathi Rey	Arko	
2016	Rustom	Tere Sang Yaara	Atif Aslam	
2016	Rustom	Tere Bin Yaara	Arko	
2016	Baar Baar Dekho	Dariya	Arko	
2016	Tum Bin II	Dil Nawaziyaan	Arko, Payal Dev	Composed by Ankit Tiwari
2017	Laali Ki Shaadi Mein Laaddoo Deewana	Rishta	Arko, Ankit Tiwari	
2017	Faster Fene	Fefe Song	Ritesh Deshmukh	
2017	Dobaara: See Your Evil	Kaari Kaari	Arko, Asees Kaur	
2017	Dobaara: See Your Evil	Humdard	Jyotica Tangri	
2017	Sweetiee Weds NRI	O Saathiya	Armaan Malik, Prakriti Kakar, Arko	
2017	Bareilly Ki Barfi	Nazm Nazm	Arko	
2017	Bareilly Ki Barfi	Nazm Nazm (2nd Version)	Ayushmann Khurrana	
2017	Bareilly Ki Barfi	Nazm Nazm (Female Version)	Sumedha Karmahe	
2017	Shaadi Mein Zaroor Aana	Jogi	Yasser Desai, Aakanksha Sharma	
2017	Shaadi Mein Zaroor Aana	Jogi (Male)	Shafqat Amanat Ali	
2017	Shaadi Mein Zaroor Aana	Jogi (Female)	Aakanksha Sharma	
2018	Hate Story 4	Boond Boond	Jubin Nautiyal, Neeti Mohan	
2018	Baaghi 2	O Saathi	Atif Aslam, Payal Dev	
2018	Daas Dev	Rangdaari	Arko & Navraj Hans	
2018	Gold	Naino Ne Bandhi	Yasser Desai	
2018	Gold	Naino Ne Bandhi (Female)	Akanksha Sharma	
2018	Gold	Bolte Pari Ni	Arko	Bengali
2018	Satyameva Jayate	Tere Jaisa	Arko, Tulsi Kumar	
2018	Jack and Dil	Chuski	Arko, Sonu Kakkar	
2019	Kesari	Teri Mitti	B Praak	
2019	Kesari	Teri Mitti (Reprise)	B Praak	Released later
2019	Kesari	Teri Mitti (Female)	Parineeti Chopra	
2019	Blank	Ali Ali	B Praak, Arko	
2019	Blank	Ali Ali (Reprise)	Navraj Hans	
2019	Bombairiya	Sanki	Arko	
2019	Bombairiya	Bairiya	Navraj Hans	
2019	Bombairiya	Bairiya (Version 2)	Navraj Hans, Akriti Kakkar	
2019	Fastey Fasaatey	Savera	Arko	
2019	The Body	"Aaina"	Tulsi Kumar, Arko, Neha Kakkar	
2019	The Body	"Khuda Haafiz"	Arijit Singh	
2020	Hacked	Mehfooz	Arko	
2020	Hacked	Mehfooz Version 2	Akanksha Sharma	
2021	Bullets	Tension Wali Raat	Neha Kakkar, Farhad Bhiwandiwala	Web Series on MX Player
2021	Bhuj: The Pride of India	Desh Mere	Arijit Singh	Disney Plus Hotstar film
2021	Satyameva Jayate 2	Jann Gann Mann	B Praak	
2021	Satyameva Jayate 2	Jann Gann Mann (Reprise)	Arko	
2022	Rashtra Kavach Om	Seher (Male version)	Arijit Singh	
2022	Rashtra Kavach Om	Seher (Female version)	Aditi Singh Sharma	
2023	Mission Majnu	Tum Ho	Papon	Netflix film
2023	U-Turn	Raasta	Asit Tripathy	Zee5 film
2023	U-Turn	Raasta (Female)	Prateeksha	Zee5 film
2023	U-Turn	Raasta (Reprise)	Raj Barman	Zee5 film
2023	Trial Period	Dheere Dheere	Arko	JioCinema film
2023	Dream Girl 2	Piya	Jubin Nautiyal	Lyrics also by Arko
2023	Sukhee	Meethi Boliyan	Sachet Tandon	
2023	Mission Raniganj	Jeetenge	B Praak, Arko	
2023	Mission Raniganj	Jeetenge (Reprise)	Stebin Ben, Arko	
2024	Dedh Bigha Zameen	Musafir	Jubin Nautiyal	JioCinema film
2024	Dedh Bigha Zameen	"Musafir (Film Version)"	Arko	JioCinema film
2024	Emergency	Ae Meri Jaan	Hariharan	

=== Bengali filmography ===
Denotes films that have not yet been released

Year	Film name	Song	Singer	Composer & Lyricist	Notes
2019	Shesh Theke Shuru	Mon Aamar	Arko	Himself	
2019	Shesh Theke Shuru	Madhubala	Akriti Kakar & Tanmoy Saadhak	Himself	
2019	Shesh Theke Shuru	Allah Aamar	Arko	Himself	
2019	Shesh Theke Shuru	Mon Aamar (Revamped Version)	Arko	Himself	
2019	Shantilal O Projapoti Rohoshyo	Shomoy	Arko	Himself	
2019	Parineeta	Tomake (Female)	Shreya Ghoshal	Himself	
2019	Parineeta	Shei Tumi	Arko	Himself	
2019	Parineeta	Tomake (Male)	Arko	Himself	

=== Telugu filmography ===
Denotes films that have not yet been released

Year	Film Name	Song	Singer(s)	Notes
2018	Lover	What A Ammayi	Sonu Nigam	
2024	Aho Vikramaarka	Salma	Mohana Bhogaraju	
2024	Aho Vikramaarka	Amma Song	Kaala Bhairava	

=== Album(s) ===
Denotes films that have not yet been released

Year(s)	Album Name(s)	Song(s)	Co-Singer(s)	Composer(s)	Language(s)
2015	Mainu Ishq Da Lagya Rog	"Mainu Ishq Da Lagya Rog" single	Tulsi Kumar	Original: Bhushan Dua, Nadeem-Shravan, Recreated by: Arko	Hindi
2018	Bepanah	"Bepanah"	Tina Kundalia, Arko	Rishabh Shrivastava	Hindi
2019	Oriplast Originals	"Baundule (বাউন্ডুলে)"	Shaan, Arko	Arko	Bengali
2019	Oriplast Originals	"Bola Jaye Na (বলা যায় না)"	Akriti Kakar, Arko	Arko	Bengali
2019	Akhbaar	"Akhbaar"	Arko	Arko	Hindi
2024	Tum Aaoge	Tum Aaoge	Arko	Arko	Hindi

== Non-film songs ==
Denotes films that have not yet been released

Year(s)	Song(s)	Singer(s)	Note(s)
2022	Oh Fatima	Arko and Chris Gayle	
2022	Kora Sa	Arko and Palak Muchhal	
2022	Sutta	Arko, Jaan Kumar Sanu and Ravleen	
2022	Hum Dono	Arko and Nikita Gandhi	
2022	Sharbat Jaisa Paani	Arko	
2022	Kuku Mera	Arko and Ankit Tiwari	
2022	Raata Din	Arko	
2022	Squandering Love	Arko	
2021	PARDESI	Arko and Asees Kaur	
2021	Na Dooja Koi	Arko and Jotiyca Tangri	
2021	AILAAN	Arko	
2021	HABIT	Arko and Shreya Ghosal	
2021	DHAT	Arko	
2020	SUNO NA	Arko and Neeti Mohan	
2020	Tum Jo Mil Gaye	Ash king and Lisa Mishra	
2019	Baashinda	Arko and Ankit Tiwari and Ragini Tandon	
2019	Dard E Dil	Ankit Tiwari and Priyanka Negi	
2019	Ek Pyaar Ka Nagma	Papon and Neeti Mohan	
2019	Baarishein	Atif Aslam	Atif Aslam's last single released in Bollywood.
2019	Akhbaar	Arko Pravo Mukherjee	
2019	Shukriya	Arko Pravo Mukherjee	
2017	Aainda	Arko Pravo Mukherjee	
2017	Salaam-e-Ishq	Arko Pravo Mukherjee and Jasmine	Producer/Remixer – DJ Shilpi Sharma
2017	Reeva	Arko Pravo Mukherjee	
2015	Mainu Ishq Da Lagya Rog	Tulsi Kumar	
2013	Maa	Arko Pravo Mukherjee	Bengali
2011	Mira (Hindi album)	Arko Pravo Mukherjee & Deb(Bishwadeb Bhaumik)	Hindi

Mukherjee is planning to record an English album in Los Angeles soon. His song 'Reeva' entered the Billboard Dance 50 Charts at number 49.
