= No Problem (2010 film) =

2010 Indian film by Anees Bazmee

- Theatrical release poster
- Directed by: Anees Bazmee
- Screenplay by: Nisar Akhtar; Aaron J Anees Bazmee; Rajan Agarwal; Ikram Akhtar
- Story by: Anees Bazmee
- Produced by: Rajat Rawail; Anil Kapoor; Dr. B. K. Modi
- Starring: Anil Kapoor; Sanjay Dutt; Akshaye Khanna; Suniel Shetty; Paresh Rawal; Sushmita Sen; Kangana Ranaut; Neetu Chandra
- Cinematography: Bobby Singh
- Edited by: Prashant Singh Rathore
- Music by: Pritam; Sajid–Wajid; Anand Raj Anand
- Production companies: Anil Kapoor Films Company; Rawail Grandsons Entertainment & Software; Spice Studios
- Distributed by: Eros International
- Release date: 10 December 2010
- Running time: 140 mins
- Country: India
- Language: Hindi

No Problem is a 2010 Indian Hindi-language action-comedy film directed by Anees Bazmee and produced by Rajat Rawail and Anil Kapoor. The film stars Kapoor himself, Sanjay Dutt, Suniel Shetty, Akshaye Khanna, Paresh Rawal, Sushmita Sen, Kangana Ranaut, Neetu Chandra, and Shakti Kapoor in the lead roles, while Ranjeet, Mukesh Tiwari, Jeetu Verma, Vishwajeet Pradhan, Suresh Menon, and Vijay Raaz are featured in supporting yet crucial roles. Shooting began in July 2010. It was shot in South Africa and Mumbai. No Problem was released worldwide on 10 December 2010, to a negative reception and underperformed at the box office.

A mobile video game based on the film was released by ASTPL.

== Plot ==
Yash Ambani and Raj Ambani are small-time crooks and childhood buddies. Raj wants to lead an honest life, but Yash always manages to do something that jeopardises Raj's chances of turning over a new leaf. When Yash robs the First Village Bank, the innocent bank manager, Zandulal, gets blamed, because he had sheltered Yash and Raj under his roof. Zandulal finds out that the two crooks fled to Durban and begs the bank chairman for time to look for the two and prove his innocence.

In Durban, diamonds worth millions have been stolen from the International Diamond Centre by an underworld gang led by Marcos. Senior inspector Arjun Singh is determined to catch Marcos and his gang. Arjun is married to Kajal Khurana, the daughter of the commissioner of the police Khurana. Kajal has a split personality – she's a loving wife and mother, who for 10 minutes every day transforms into Kamini, a terrifying troublemaker, intent on murdering Arjun.

Yash and Raj try to avoid Zandulal, who does not realise that they are his neighbours. Raj falls in love with Sanjana Khurana, Kajal's younger sister. He pretends to be arrogant, wanting her to think that lots of girls are crazy for him. After he confesses, however, they plan on getting married. At Khurana's house, Zandulal encounters Yash and Raj, threatening to expose them unless they return the money they stole from his bank. Cornered, Raj and Yash agree to commit one last robbery. They rob a minister's house, minutes before Marcos arrives. The minister is tortured and killed, because Marcos cannot find the stolen diamonds.

During Sanjana's engagement with Raj, Arjun, with Kajal's father, arrest Yash, Raj and Zandulal for robbing the minister's house. They are sent to prison, but Yash bribes a film director to help him escape. Marcos confronts Raj and Yash about the diamonds. He attempts to intimidate them by tying them to a train track on which a train is rushing full speed, but this fails because the train rushes at him and his gang instead of Yash and Raj.

Because of the cancellation of Sanjana's engagement and marriage, Kajal's fits become worse. She uses guns and knives on Arjun to kill him. Kajal's father tries to get them to divorce but to no avail. Yash kidnaps Sanjana and, with Raj, wins approval from Kajal to help them against Marcos. They also kidnap one of Marcos' associates, Sofia. To intimidate Marcos further, they dress up for a festival and run away with the diamonds. The diamonds eventually get thrown into a fish tank, and the fish eat them all up. The tank then shatters, draining the water into the nearby shore.

After a hilarious climax, Sofia disappears, never to be seen again. Arjun is relocated to another town to start police-training from scratch. Marcos and his associates are all arrested and sentenced to 40 years in prison for their crimes. Yash and Raj start a fishing business to recover their lost diamonds.

== Cast ==
- Anil Kapoor as Senior Inspector Arjun Singh, Kajal's husband.
- Sanjay Dutt as Yash Ambani
- Suniel Shetty as Marcos
- Akshaye Khanna as Raj Ambani
- Sushmita Sen as Kajal Khurana Singh / Kamini, Arjun's wife.
- Paresh Rawal as Zandu lal
- Kangana Ranaut as Sanjana Khurana
- Neetu Chandra as Sofia
- Shakti Kapoor as Police Commissioner Khurana
- Suresh Menon as Naidu
- Ranjeet as Khoka
- Mukesh Tiwari as DC
- Jeetu Verma as Dumbo
- Vishwajeet Pradhan as Lara
- Suzanne Bernert as Savitri
- Saloni Daini as Tuk Tuk
- Vijay Raaz as Maut Ka Farishta / Suicidal man
- Kamal Chopra as Minister Sanyal
- Cochin Haneefa as Dr. Ramacharya
- Anil Nagrath as Doctor treating Arjun
- Paresh Ganatra as widower at hospital

== Music ==
No Problem

Soundtrack album by Pritam
- Released: November 22, 2010
- Genre: Film soundtrack
- Label: T-Series

Pritam chronology
Action Replayy (2010)	No Problem (2010)	Khatta Meetha (2010)

The music of the film is composed by Sajid–Wajid, Pritam and Anand Raj Anand. Lyrics are penned by Shabbir Ahmed, Kumaar and Anand Raj Anand. The music was released on 22 November 2010.

=== Track listing ===
No.	Title	Music	Singer(s)	Length
1.	"Babe Di Kripa"	Pritam	Vikrant Singh, Kalpana Patowary	4:02
2.	"Mast Punjabi"	Anand Raj Anand	Anand Raj Anand, Sunidhi Chauhan	4:31
3.	"No Problem"	Sajid–Wajid	Wajid, Suzanne D'Mello	4:24
4.	"Shakira"	Pritam	Master Saleem, Hard Kaur, Kalpana Patowary	4:00
5.	"We Are Innocent"	Pritam	Suraj Jagan	4:46
6.	"Babe Di Kripa (Remix by Kiran Kamath)"		Vikrant Singh, Kalpana Patowary	3:26
7.	"Mast Punjabi (Remix by DJ Suketu feat PaVaN)"		Anand Raj Anand, Sunidhi Chauhan	4:48
8.	"Shakira (Remix by DJ Suketu feat PaVaN)"	Anand Raj Anand	Master Saleem, Hard Kaur, Kalpana Patowary	4:09
Total length:				34:09

== Reception ==
=== Critical response ===
No Problem garnered mainly negative reviews from Indian critics. Anupama Chopra of NDTV gave one star saying, "No Problem is so staggeringly brain dead and relentlessly tedious that it makes Anees Bazmee’s earlier comedies, No Entry (26 August 2005), Welcome (21 December 2007) & Singh Is Kinng (8 August 2008) look like classics." Rajeev Masand of CNN-IBN rated it 1/5, describing the film as "2010's most abysmal comedy." Mayank Shekhar of the Hindustan Times also gave it one star suggesting, "Why bother with something hilarious when you can just get downright delirious. Of course, that is if you have no problems of your own to deal with." Raja Sen of Rediff too rated the film 1/5 concluding that "No Problem is devoid of taste, flavour and jokes." Taran Adarsh of Bollywood Hungama gave it 1.5/5 suggesting "No Problem has some funny moments in the first half, but gets agonizing towards the second half." Nikhat Kazmi of the Times of India gave the only positive review: rating the film 3/5 and suggesting that the film "makes you forget your problems, provided you are willing to get goofy and give up your quest for meaning in masala."

=== Box office ===
The film opened in India to a poor response, collecting Rs. 42.5 million on the first day. It showed a jump on Saturday and collected Rs. 50 million. A few single screens showed small drops in collections, but most multiplexes were strong. No Problem collected Rs. 62.5 million on Sunday, making its weekend collections up to Rs. 154.9 million. It grossed ₹ 284.7 million by the end of its second week and was declared a flop by Box Office India.

== Awards ==
Award	Category	Recipients and nominees	Results
International Indian Film Academy Awards	Best Comedian	Anil Kapoor	Nominated

== Sequel ==
No Problem 2 is an upcoming Indian Hindi-language action-comedy film directed by Ahmed Khan.
