= Baaghi 2 =

2018 Indian film by Ahmed Khan

- Theatrical release poster
- Directed by: Ahmed Khan
- Written by: Ahmed Khan; Shaan Yadav; Abbas Hierapurwala; Niraj Kumar Mishra
- Story by: Original Story: Adivi Sesh; Adapted Story: Sajid Nadiadwala
- Based on: Kshanam by: Ravikanth Perepu; Adivi Sesh
- Produced by: Sajid Nadiadwala
- Starring: Tiger Shroff; Disha Patani; Manoj Bajpayee; Darshan Kumar; Prateik Babbar; Randeep Hooda; Deepak Dobriyal; Arravya Sharma
- Cinematography: Santhana Krishnan Ravichandran
- Edited by: Rameshwar S. Bhagat
- Music by: Score: Julius Packiam; Songs: Mithoon; Arko; Sandeep Shirodkar; Gourov-Roshin; Pranaay Rijia
- Production company: Nadiadwala Grandson Entertainment
- Distributed by: Fox Star Studios
- Release date: 30 March 2018
- Running time: 137 minutes
- Country: India
- Language: Hindi
- Budget: ₹59 crore (Note: figure contains print and advertising costs}
- Box office: est. ₹258 crore

Baaghi 2 is a 2018 Indian Hindi-language action thriller film directed by Ahmed Khan and produced by Nadiadwala Grandson Entertainment. The film, which is the second installment in Baaghi film series, is a remake of the 2016 Telugu film Kshanam. It stars Tiger Shroff, alongside Disha Patani, Manoj Bajpayee, Darshan Kumar, Prateik Babbar, Randeep Hooda, Deepak Dobriyal, and Arravya Sharma.

Principal photography commenced for the film in August 2017, and it was shot in Mumbai, Pune, Shanghai, Goa, China, Manali, and Thailand. The film was finished with a budget of ₹59 crore (US$6.3 million), including print and promotion costs.

Baaghi 2 was released worldwide on 30 March 2018, including 3500 screens in India. It received mixed reviews from critics with praise for its action sequences and technical aspects, but criticized its pacing and script. The film grossed over ₹258 crore (US$28 million) worldwide and become one of the highest-grossing Hindi film of 2018.

== Plot ==
Ranveer "Ronny" Pratap Singh, an Indian Army PARA Special Forces Captain, gets a voice call from his ex-girlfriend Neha Rawat after a long gap. They studied in the same college and wanted to marry, but her father Mahendra Rawat arranged an alliance with Shekhar Salgaonkar, an entrepreneur. Ronny, who still loves Neha, leaves for Goa on the pretense of a short trip. Ronny meets Neha at a restaurant and learns her five-year-old daughter Rhea is missing. Neha laments that no one else, including Shekhar, believes that Rhea actually exists. Ronny also learns about Shekhar's brother Sunny, a drug addict, who regularly visits her home.

Ronny begins an informal investigation in which he meets DIG Ajay Shergill, who is the friend of Ronnie's commanding officer Col. Ranjit Singh Walia. Ronny follows Sunny to a building, where he finds out Usman Langda, a local physically disabled travel agent, is involved in drug peddling. Ronny asks Usman about Rhea, but Usman does not seem to know anything. Posing as a cop Anand Tyagi, Ronny meets Shekhar and learns that the couple were childless. Shekhar recalls Neha being attacked by two masked men before a school to steal her car. Shekhar added that Neha went into a coma and post-recovery started claiming that she had a daughter Rhea. A perplexed Ronny watches a CCTV footage of the masked men attacking Neha on the day when Rhea went missing. Unfortunately, Rhea is seen nowhere in the footage, which makes Ronny doubt about Neha's mental condition.

Ronny confronts Neha, who refuses to acknowledge that Rhea is imaginary. Ronny sees height markings of a child on a wall, and before he could react, Neha commits suicide in his presence. Shergill and ACP Loha Singh Dhull (LSD) investigate the case. Anand Tyagi gets killed by two unknown killers, while Usman confesses to Ronny that he saw Sunny kidnapping Rhea. Ronny captures Sunny, who later gets killed by Shergill in an act of self-defense during the interrogation. The same night, Tyagi's killers attack Usman, but Ronny defeats them. Usman dies due to his injuries.

Ronny watches a MMS in the killers' phone sent by Shergill instructing to kill him. Ronny goes to Shergill's army base and a battle ensues between Ronny and Shergill's army. Enraged, Ronny kills the army and destroys helicopters despite injuries. Ronny confronts Shergill, who reveals that Shekhar wanted to kill Rhea and had arranged the attack on Neha, after which Shergill found Rhea in Bobby's custody. Shergill made a deal with Shekhar that Rhea will be with him till a drug consignment is reached as Shergill was involved in drug business.

Shekhar wanted Neha to suffer so according to a plan, Shekhar convinced his friends and family to pretend that Rhea never existed, saying Neha cannot bear the shock of her daughter's death. Before Shergill can kill Ronny, LSD shoots Shergill after listening to the conversation on his way to the base with his subordinates. Shekhar is arrested and reveals that Rhea is not his daughter, as a medical report confirmed him sterile in the past. Ronny remembers his last meeting with Neha, who had visited him to invite him to her wedding, and they made love. Ronny now realises Rhea is his daughter. Ronny approaches Rhea and sees a reflection of Neha smiling at him.

== Cast ==
- Tiger Shroff as Captain Ranveer "Ronny" Pratap Singh, PARA SF
- Disha Patani as Neha Rawat Salgaonkar, Ronny's ex-girlfriend
- Arravya Sharma as Rhea Pratap Singh, Neha and Ronny's daughter
- Manoj Bajpayee as DIG Ajay Shergill
- Randeep Hooda as ACP Loha Singh Dhull (LSD)
- Darshan Kumar as Shekhar Salgaonkar, Neha's husband
- Deepak Dobriyal as Usman Langda
- Prateik Babbar as Sunny Salgaonkar, Shekhar's brother
- Jahid D'cruz as Jahid
- Shifuji Shaurya Bhardwaj as Col. Ranjit Singh Walia, PARA SF
- Vipin Sharma as Mahendra Rawat, Neha's father
- Sunit Morarjee as Inspector Sharad Kute
- Pushy Anand as School principal
- Ashutosh Singh as Inspectorv Anand Tyagi
- Ashwin Kaushal as a bungalow owner
- Jacqueline Fernandez as Mohini in the song Ek Do Teen (special appearance)

== Production ==
=== Development ===
On 1 May 2017, Tiger Shroff posted the first look poster of the film on his Twitter account. The producer of the film, Sajid Nadiadwala, collaborated with Fox Star Studios and the film was released under Fox Star Studios and Nadiadwala Grandson Entertainment.

Initially, it was reported that Jacqueline Fernandez and Kriti Sanon were considered for the lead female role. However, in June 2017, Disha Patani was cast after going through a screen test with Shroff. Talking about the cast, Nadiadwala said, "They share an amazing onscreen chemistry, which was evident in their look test. Disha is just perfect for the role. I am happy with my cast and am excited to kick-start the project."

Shroff went to Hong Kong for training of martial arts under action director Tonny Ching while Patani received acrobatic training.

In July 2017, Nadiadwala cast Prateik Babbar to play the negative role.

The film was produced on a budget of ₹590 million ($6.11 million).

=== Filming ===
Principal photography started on 8 August 2017. The shoot began with a song featuring the lead cast members on a set in Mumbai, followed by scenes shot on the campus of FLAME University in Pune and several other places. Then the team filmed in Manali, Thailand, China, Goa and Ladakh. A torture scene of Shroff's character was filmed while the actor was naked.

== Release ==
The film was released worldwide on 30 March 2018. It opened in 4,125 screens in 46 countries, including 3,500 screens in India.

== Box office ==
Baaghi 2 earned ₹25.10 crore net on its opening day and ₹73.1 crore net on first weekend. After two weeks, the movie had a net collection of ₹148.45 crore in India.

Overseas, it made gross of ₹43.59 crore (US$4.7 million). The film grossed a total of ₹254.33 crore (US$27 million) worldwide, including ₹210.74 crore (US$23 million) from India The film was one of the highest-grossing Bollywood films of 2018.

== Reception ==
=== Critical response ===
Baaghi 2 received mixed reviews from critics.

On the review aggregator website Rotten Tomatoes, 33% of 12 critics' reviews are positive, with an average rating of 4/10.

Bollywood Hungama gave 3/5 stars and wrote "Baaghi 2 boasts of an extraordinary action and spectacular performance from Tiger Shroff with an absence of a convincing and engaging screenplay as a minus point." Hiren Kotwani of DNA gave 3/5 stars and wrote "Ahmed Khan’s direction is competent and he has executed it keeping his actors’ capabilities in mind. If you’re game for action and a fan of Tiger Shroff’s stuntbaazi, then you should give this film a shot." Umesh Punwani of Koimoi gave 3/5 stars and wrote "Some movies are just made with the purpose of serving entertainment and Baaghi 2 is one of them." Rachit Gupta of The Times of India gave 2.5/5 stars and wrote "With better editing and a taut screenplay, Baaghi 2 could have packed a stronger punch. However, folks who enjoy mindless and impossible action could watch this film to kill time." Shubhra Gupta of The Indian Express gave 2.5/5 stars and wrote "The trouble with a full-on masala film going in search of a plot is evident in the way the film unspools. The bare bones are borrowed from Telugu thriller Kshanam, but the fillings are all strictly Bollywood." Devesh Sharma of Filmfare gave 2.5/5 stars and wrote "The film is a must watch for action junkies. Tiger is a true-blue action star alright and those craving for some high octane thrills won't come away disappointed." Lakshana. N. Palat of India Today gave 2/5 stars and wrote "Baaghi 2 is ridden with loopholes the size of craters, and doesn't have a coherent structure." Namratha Joshi of The Hindu wrote "Nothing matters other than Tiger Shroff in a film that bores as well as amuses with its inanity." Rohit Bhatnagar of Deccan Chronicle wrote "Baaghi 2 is one of those masala entertainers that can be watched once over popcorn. A perfect massy flick away from the quality cinema."

== Soundtrack ==
Baaghi 2

Soundtrack album by Mithoon, Arko, Sandeep Shirodkar, Gourov-Roshin and Pranaay Rijia
- Released: 20 March 2018
- Recorded: 2017–2018
- Genre: Feature film soundtrack
- Length: 25:02
- Language: Hindi
- Label: T-Series
- Director: Ahmed Khan
- Producer: Sajid Nadiadwala

Official audio
- Full Album : Baaghi 2 on YouTube

Mithoon chronology
Hate Story 4 (2018)	Baaghi 2 (2018)	Mercury (2018)

Arko chronology
Hate Story 4 (2018)	Baaghi 2 (2018)	Gold (2018)

Sandeep Shirodkar chronology
Judwaa 2 (2017)	Baaghi 2 (2018)	Thackeray (2019)

Gourov-Roshin chronology
Mubarakan (2017)	Baaghi 2 (2018)	Total Dhamaal (2019)

Pranaay Rijia chronology
Munna Michael (2017)	Baaghi 2 (2018)	Baaghi 3 (2020)

Singles from Baaghi 2
- 1. "Mundiyan" Released: 1 March 2018; 2. "O Saathi" Released: 9 March 2018; 3. "Lo Safar" Released: 13 March 2018; 4. "Ek Do Teen" Released: 19 March 2018

The music of the film was composed by Laxmikant-Pyarelal, Mithoon, Arko, Sandeep Shirodkar, Gourov-Roshin, and Pranaay Rijia. Lyrics were written by Kumaar, Ginny Diwan, Javed Akhtar, Arko Pravo Mukherjee, and Sayeed Quadri. The background score was composed by Julius Packiam. The songs featured in the film are sung by Atif Aslam, Jubin Nautiyal, Ankit Tiwari, Navraj Hans, Shreya Ghoshal, Palak Muchhal, Shruti Pathak, Parry G, Pranaay Rijia, Anand Bhaskar, Siddharth Basrur, Jatinder Singh and Big Dhillon.

The first song of the film, "Mundiyan", which is a recreated version of the Panjabi MC song "Mundian To Bach Ke", was sung by Navraj Hans and Palak Muchhal, and was released on 1 March 2018. The second single to be released was "O Saathi", sung by Atif Aslam, and released on 9 March 2018. The third song of the film, "Lo Safar", sung by Jubin Nautiyal, was released on 13 March 2018. The fourth song, "Ek Do Teen", an item song featuring Jacqueline Fernandez, from the 1988 film, Tezaab, was recreated for this film. It was sung by Shreya Ghoshal with a rap by Parry G, and was released on 19 March 2018. Although in the film, the song is sung by Palak Muchhal for the final version because the production team made a mistake by including the rehearsal version in the final version of the film. After that, Palak Muchhal's version was released on 19 April 2019. The music album was released on 20 March 2018 by T-Series.

Track listing
No.	Title	Lyrics	Music	Singer(s)	Length
1.	"Mundiyan"	Ginny Diwan	Sandeep Shirodkar	Navraj Hans, Palak Muchhal	3:29
2.	"Ek Do Teen"	Javed Akhtar	Sandeep Shirodkar	Shreya Ghoshal, Parry G	4:04
3.	"O Saathi"	Arko	Arko	Atif Aslam	4:11
4.	"Lo Safar"	Sayeed Quadri	Mithoon	Jubin Nautiyal	4:42
5.	"Soniye Dil Nayi"	Kumaar	Gourov-Roshin	Ankit Tiwari, Shruti Pathak	5:20
6.	"Get Ready To Fight Again"	Ginny Diwan	Pranaay Rijia	Pranaay, Anand Bhaskar, Jatinder Singh, Siddharth Basrur, Big Dhillon	3:16
Total length:					25:02

== Sequel ==
On 19 February 2018, the third installment of the film was announced under the title of Baaghi 3, with Sajid Nadiawala as producer, Ahmed Khan as director, Tiger Shroff and Shraddha Kapoor starring in the lead roles. The team started shooting in September 2019. It was released worldwide on 6 March 2020. Ritesh Deshmukh also joined the cast of the film.
