= Sandeep Shirodkar =

Indian film composer

Sandeep Shirodkar is an Indian film score composer, music director and record producer. He has also worked as an arranger of songs for other composers.

He has composed background scores for notable films like Dabangg, Bodyguard, Once Upon A Time in Mumbaai and Prince.

He has recently debuted as an original song composer. Sandeep along with Anu Malik composed the Chalti Hai Kya 9 Se 12 remake, Unchi Hai Building 2.0 remake for Judwaa 2.

== Early life and career ==
Sandeep's father Hemant Shirodkar, was a sessions musician who played guitar for the famous yesteryear composer duo, Kalyanji–Anandji. As a child, Sandeep used to frequently accompany his father at session recordings.

He learnt to play the synthesizer from his father at the age of seven. Sandeep's professional career as a musician started when he played at his first recording session at the age of 12. He soon realized that this was what he was going to do in life; make music.

Sandeep also apprenticed under composer Viju Shah (son of Shri Kalyanji), whom he regards as his ‘Guru’.

== Partial filmography as Background Score Composer ==
Below listed films are in Hindi language.

Year	Film	Notes
1997	Hameshaa	With Salim-Sulaiman
2008	C Kkompany	
2010	Prince	
2010	Once Upon A Time in Mumbaai	
2010	Dabangg	
2011	Dil Toh Baccha Hai Ji	
2011	Thank You	
2011	Ready	
2011	Bodyguard	
2011	Desi Boyz	
2011	The Dirty Picture	
2012	Players	
2012	Housefull 2	
2012	Teri Meri Kahaani	
2012	Ajab Gazabb Love	
2013	Dabangg 2	
2013	Himmatwala	
2013	Chashme Baddoor	
2013	Ramaiya Vastavaiya	
2013	Once Upon ay Time in Mumbai Dobaara!	
2013	Boss	
2014	Main Tera Hero	
2014	Samrat & Co.	
2014	Humshakals	
2014	Raja Natwarlal	
2015	Phir Se...	
2015	Singh Is Bliing	
2014	Heropanti	
2016	Azhar	
2016	One Night Stand	
2017	Machine	
2017	Judwaa 2	
2019	Total Dhamaal	
2019	Dabangg 3	
2020	Tanhaji	
2021	Murder at Teesri Manzil 302	
2022	Bhool Bhulaiyaa 2	
2023	Zara Hatke Zara Bachke	

== Original Songs ==
Year	Film	Song	Singer(s)	Writer(s)	Notes
2017	Judwaa 2	"Chalti Hai Kya 9 se 12" remake	Dev Negi, Neha Kakkar	Dev Kohli	with Anu Malik
2017	Judwaa 2	"Unchi Hai Building 2.0" remake	Anu Malik, Neha Kakkar	Dev Kohli	with Anu Malik
2018	Baaghi 2	"Mundiyan" remake	Navraj Hans, Palak Muchhal	Ginny Diwan	with Punjabi MC
2018	Baaghi 2	"Ek Do Teen" remake	Shreya Ghoshal, Parry G	Javed Akhtar	original by Laxmikant–Pyarelal
2018	Baaghi 2	"Ek Do Teen" remake (Film version)	Palak Muchhal	Javed Akhtar	original by Laxmikant–Pyarelal
2019	Thackeray	"Thackeray Theme"	Himself	Instrumental	
2019	Housefull 4	"The Bhoot Song"	Mika Singh, Farhad Samji	Farhad Samji, Vayu	with Farhad Samji
2019	Satellite Shankar	"Jai He"	Salman Ali	Manoj Muntashir	
2024	Kahan Shuru Kahan Khatam	"Rang Udaye"	Asees Kaur, Varun Jain	Kumaar	

== Awards ==
- Global Indian Music Award (GIMA) 2011 and Zee Cine Award 2011 and Mirchi Music Award 2011 for Best Background Score – Dabangg
- BIG Star IMA 2011 Award for Best Background Score – Once Upon A Time in Mumbaai
