= Twin Dragons =

1992 Hong Kong film by Ringo Lam and Tsui Hark

- Hong Kong film poster

Chinese name
- Traditional Chinese: 雙龍會
- Simplified Chinese: 双龙会
Transcriptions
Standard Mandarin
- Hanyu Pinyin: Shuāng Lóng Huì
Yue: Cantonese
- Jyutping: Seong1 Lung4 Wui2
- Directed by: Ringo Lam; Tsui Hark
- Written by: Barry Wong; Tsui Hark; Joe Cheung; Wong Yik; Teddy Robin
- Produced by: Teddy Robin; Ng See-Yuen
- Starring: Jackie Chan; Maggie Cheung; Teddy Robin
- Cinematography: Arthur Wong; Wong Wing-Hung
- Edited by: Marco Mak
- Music by: Lowell Lo; Barrington Pheloung; Michael Wandmacher
- Production companies: Hong Kong Film Directors Guild; Distant Horizons
- Distributed by: Golden Harvest; Media Asia Distribution Ltd.
- Release date: 15 January 1992
- Running time: 104 minutes
- Country: Hong Kong
- Language: Cantonese
- Box office: US$46.9 million

Twin Dragons is a 1992 Hong Kong action comedy film directed by Ringo Lam and Tsui Hark, and starring Jackie Chan in a dual role as identical twin brothers separated at birth. This movie is an adaptation of a 1982 Bengali movie Shathe Shathyang.

The film also goes by titles such as Brother vs. Brother, Duel of Dragons, When Dragons Collide and Double Dragons.

== Plot ==
In 1965, a Hong Kong couple are doting on their newborn identical twin boys. Meanwhile, a dangerous gang leader named Crazy Kung is being transported as a captive in the same hospital. Crazy Kung escapes and attempts to take one of the twins hostage, and in the ensuing chaos the twins are permanently separated. One of the twins, named Ma Yau, is taken to America by his parents and grows up to be a concert pianist and conductor. The other twin, Ma Wan, is found and raised by an alcoholic woman named Tsui, and becomes a street racer and martial artist named Bok Min. For years, neither of them is aware that he has an identical twin brother.

26 years later, the twins' lives intersect again: Bok Min and his best friend Tarzan (Tyson in US version) get mixed up with a dangerous gang, while Ma Yau prepares to conduct a major concert in Hong Kong. In addition, the twins gain romantic interests: Bok Min meets Barbara, a club singer Tarzan (Tyson) is interested in, and Yau becomes acquainted with Tong Sum, a young woman from a respectable family who has a secret passion for fighter types. Eventually, the twins meet and discover that they share a strange connection with each other. As a result, a string of comedic mix-ups ensues when Ma Yau is accidentally enlisted by the gangsters to participate as an escape driver in the liberation of none other than Crazy Kung; Bok Min in turn is forced to conduct Yau's concert (which becomes a smash hit despite him having absolutely no musical talent); and the two of them end up with the other's girl as their respective love interest.

Eventually, things come to a head when the gangsters kidnap Tarzan (Tyson) to make Ma Yau surrender a briefcase meant for Crazy Kung, which Ma Yau had accidentally nabbed. The twins join up to defeat the gang that has turned their lives upside down, and in a showdown in a vehicle testing center Crazy Kung dies in a runaway crash test car. The film ends with the impending double wedding of the twins to their girls and Bok Min's introduction to his real parents, but when Bok Min gets cold feet and Ma Yau goes looking for him, a final gag falls into place when the wedding guests catch the two twins together and are unable to tell them apart.

== Cast ==
- Jackie Chan as Ma Yau (John Ma in the American release)
- Jackie Chan as Bok Min (Boomer in the American release)
- Maggie Cheung as Barbara
- Nina Li Chi as Tong Sum (Tammy in the American release)
- Teddy Robin as Tarzan (Tyson in the American release)
- Anthony Chan as hotel staffer
- Philip Chan as hotel manager Chen
- Sylvia Chang as the twins' mother
- James Wong as the twins' father
- Alfred Cheung as Boss Wing
- Jacob Cheung as cafe cashier
- Cheung Tung-jo as orchestra member
- John Keung as hotel security officer
- Chor Yuen as Uncle Tang (Tammy's father)
- Lau Kar-leung as doctor
- Kirk Wong as Crazy Kung
- Wong Lung-wai as Wai
- Lai Ying-chow as Tsao
- Jamie Luk as Rocky
- John Woo as priest
- Tsui Siu-ming as priest
- Eric Tsang as man talking on the phone (Man on Phone in the American release)
- David Wu as waiter
- Pa Shan as thug
- Ringo Lam as car mechanic
- Ng Sze-yuen as car mechanic
- Tsui Hark as car mechanic
- Clifton Ko as sports shop owner
- Tai Kit Mak

== Production ==
According to co-director Tsui Hark, Ringo Lam handled most of the action scenes in the film. The action in the film has a larger focus on actual martial arts than on Jackie Chan's usual comedic style.

=== Music ===
Ma Yau's Concert depicted in the movie is the Ruslan and Lyudmila Overture, by Mikhail Glinka.

== Release ==
The film received an American release on 9 April 1999 in a dubbed version. The American release of the film cuts 16 minutes of scenes involving Wong Jing and Lau Kar-leung in a hospital and a fantasy scene involving Maggie Cheung singing.

== Reception ==
=== Box office ===
On the film's release in Hong Kong, Twin Dragons was the ninth highest-grossing film of the year, earning HK$33,225,134 during its theatrical run. In Taiwan, it was the twelfth top-grossing film of 1992, earning NT$27,972,400. In Japan, the film grossed ¥545 million. In South Korea, it was the third top-grossing film of 1992, selling 768,951 tickets and grossing US$3.46 million.

Upon release in North America, the film grossed US$8,332,431 in the United States, ending its North American run with a total of US$8,359,717 in the United States and Canada. In total, the film grossed US$46,861,333 worldwide, equivalent to US$86,265,362 adjusted for inflation.

=== Critical response ===
On the review aggregator website Rotten Tomatoes, 43% of 37 critics' reviews are positive, with an average rating of 5.1/10. The website's consensus reads: "Despite some entertaining action, this movie has serious plot holes and bad direction." At Metacritic, which assigns a normalized rating out of 100 to reviews from mainstream critics, the film has received an average score of 54, based on 15 reviews. The Austin Chronicle gave the film a positive review of three and a half stars out of five, noting that the film is "only for those who are fully on the bus with Jackie's approach...and who won't let a little bad (okay, execrable) English-language dubbing get in the way of their movie enjoyment". The A.V. Club gave a positive review, but noted that it "probably won't make anyone forget Dragons Forever, Wheels On Meals, Project A, or any number of other excellent Chan films". Some reviews critiqued the special effects, such as in Variety which noted that "the camera trickery is glaringly cheesy in some shots, greatly undercutting the illusion of twin brothers in the same frame. When the two brothers first meet in a hotel lavatory, it's easy to see how two shots have been overlapped". Writing for Sight and Sound, Kim Newman found the film's numerous cameo appearances to be annoying, stating that "few of the distinguished participants show much skill with double-take comedy". TV Guide gave the film one star out of four, noting that it "suffers from some very dicey twinning effects when the brothers are in frame together. Only die-hard and undemanding Chan fans need apply". Jackie Chan was unhappy with how Twin Dragons came out to be primarily based on the special effects. Chan stated that he worked with Tsui Hark who he felt would provide the film with better special effects. Chan was so soured with the results of the special effects that he decided he would only attempt more special-effect based work in his American productions.

== Remakes ==
The film spawned several Indian film remakes. Hello Brother (1994) is a Telugu film based on Twin Dragons. In turn, Hello Brother was remade into the Hindi film Judwaa (1997) starring Salman Khan, which in turn spawned a reboot Judwaa 2 (2017) starring Varun Dhawan. Hello Brother was also remade as the Kannada film Cheluva (1997).

== See also ==
- Hong Kong films of 1992
- Jackie Chan filmography
- List of action films of the 1990s
- List of comedy films of the 1990s

== Bibliography ==
- Morton, Lisa (2009). The Cinema of Tsui Hark. McFarland. ISBN 978-0-7864-4460-1.
- Witterstaetter, Renée (1997). Dying for action: the life and films of Jackie Chan. Hachette Digital, Inc. ISBN 0-446-67296-3.
