= Hello Brother (1994 film) =

1994 Indian film by E. V. V. Satyanarayana

- Theatrical release poster
- Directed by: E. V. V. Satyanarayana
- Screenplay by: E. V. V. Satyanarayana; L.B. Sriram (dialogues)
- Story by: E. V. V. Satyanarayana; Ramani
- Produced by: K. L. Narayana; S. Gopala Reddy (Presenter)
- Starring: Nagarjuna; Ramya Krishna; Soundarya
- Cinematography: S. Gopal Reddy
- Edited by: K. Ravindra Babu
- Music by: Raj–Koti
- Production company: Sri Durga Arts
- Release date: 20 April 1994
- Running time: 167 minutes
- Country: India
- Language: Telugu

Hello Brother is a 1994 Indian Telugu-language action comedy film, produced by K. L. Narayana and directed by E. V. V. Satyanarayana. It stars Nagarjuna, Ramya Krishna and Soundarya, with music composed by Raj–Koti. The film is loosely based on the Hong Kong action comedy Twin Dragons (1992) starring Jackie Chan, which itself is an adaptation of Ranjit Mallick starrer Bengali film Shathe Shathyang (1982). In turn, Hello Brother spawned several of its own remakes, twice in Hindi as Judwaa (1997) and its reboot Judwaa 2 (2017) and in Kannada as Cheluva (1997). The film was the highest grossing Telugu movie of 1994.

== Plot ==
Misra, a dacoit, is arrested by SP Chakravarthy. Misra tries to attack Chakravarthy, so the latter shoots him in the leg, due to which he is taken to the hospital, where Chakravarthy is waiting for his wife Geetha, who is pregnant and gives birth to twins. The doctor says that both children have a reflection mentality (where one person's pain is reflected in the other's), depending on the distance. Misra escapes and takes one of the twins with him, hurting Geetha. Chakravarthy pursues him but is unable to find the child and shoots Misra. The other twin saves the child due to their reflective mentality, and a female laborer witnesses it. The child is taken by her husband, and they adopt him and raise him as their own child, while they later have a daughter.

One day, in an accident at a construction site, the couple is killed. As a result, the two children become orphans. As they grow up, one of the twins, Deva, becomes a thief to earn a living with his friend Kasi, another orphan. On the other hand, Geetha goes into a coma, and Chakravarthy takes her to America for the cure, where the other twin, Ravi Varma, is brought up. He returns to India as a rock star to give performances. He is received by Chakravarthy's friend, who wishes to marry his daughter Manga to him, but Manga is in love with Deva. At the airport, Ravi Varma falls for Ooha, the daughter of Akkamamba, who is organizing his programs. Simhachalam, Akkamamba's brother, also wishes to marry Ooha. Meanwhile, at home, Manga advances with Ravi, thinking he is Deva. One day in a restaurant, they see each other and find that they are identical, which leads to humorous misunderstandings.

Meanwhile, Deva's sister Kasthuri witnesses a ruthless don and flutist Mitra, the son of Misra, who murdered an inspector on the road for refusing to stay corrupt and providing evidence against him in court. Furious, Mitra attempts to rape her, and Deva fights with him, so Mitra wants to take revenge against Deva. He sends his henchman as the groom to Kasthuri, but Deva breaks up the plan and marries his sister to another man. Deva obtains all the pieces of evidence detailing Mitra's crimes and gets him jailed. Later, the court decides on the death sentence for Mitra.

As months pass, Kasthuri becomes pregnant and is admitted to the hospital for delivery. Deva asks Ravi to stay at the hospital, as he is going in search of money. Ravi visits his father, Chakravarthy. At the same time, after killing the new inspector, Mitra escapes from jail, comes to the hospital to kidnap Kasthuri, recognizes Chakravarthy as the one who killed his father, and also gets to know that Deva is his son. Mitra blackmails Deva to get Chakravarthy to release Kasthuri. Deva, who does not know that Chakravarthy is his father, goes to his house, where Geetha also comes out of the coma by Deva's touch, and he discovers that they are his parents. Finally, Deva and Ravi join, protect their father and sister, and bring Mitra to justice. The story ends with the duo marrying their respective love interests.

== Cast ==
- Nagarjuna in a dual role as
  - Deva Varma
    - Master Baladitya as Child Deva
  - Ravi Varma
- Ramya Krishna as Mangathayaru alias Manga (Voice Dubbed by Saritha)
- Soundarya as Ooha (Voice Dubbed by Shilpa)
- Napoleon as Mitra
  - Master Uday as Child Mitra
- Srihari as Simhachalam, Ooha's uncle
- Kota Srinivasa Rao as S. I. Thadi Mataiyya (later Constable)
- Brahmanandam as Kaasi
- Ali as Higaral
- Sarath Babu as Chakravarthy
- Sangeetha as Geetha
- Charan Raj as Misra, Mitra's father
- Giri Babu as Manga's father
- Sudha as Manga's mother
- Annapurna as Akkamamba, Ooha's mother
- Siva Parvathi as Deva's foster mother
- Aruna Sri as Kasthuri, Deva's sister
- Sri Lakshmi as Thadi Mataiyya's wife
- Mallikarjuna Rao as Constable Chitti (later S. I.)
- Babu Mohan as Satti Pandu
- Rajanala Kaleswara Rao as Rajanala
- Sivaji Raja as Mitra's henchman
- Narsing Yadav as Mitra's henchman
- Gautam Raju as Inspector (who arrests Deva)
- Kota Shankar Rao as Inspector (Mitra's victim)
- Ashok Kumar as Chakravarthy's brother-in-law
- Jenny as Marvadi
- Madan Mohan as Jailor
- Ananth Babu
- Kadambari Kiran as Sentry
- Rambha as dancer in song "Kanne Pettaro"
- Aamani as dancer in song "Kanne Pettaro"
- Indraja as dancer in song "Kanne Pettaro"

== Production ==
Principal photography began with the song "Priya Raagaley".

== Soundtrack ==
Hello Brother

Film score by Raj–Koti
- Released: 1994
- Genre: Soundtrack
- Length: 30:34
- Label: Supreme Music
- Producer: Raj–Koti

Raj–Koti chronology
Govinda Govinda (1994)	Hello Brother (1994)	Bhale Mamayya (1994)

The music was composed by Raj–Koti.

No.	Title	Lyrics	Singer(s)	Length
1.	"Ekkandayya Baabu"	Vennelakanti	S. P. Balasubrahmanyam, Chitra	5:06
2.	"Manasichhi Icchi"	Veturi	S. P. Balasubrahmanyam, Chitra	5:10
3.	"Abba Em Dhebba"	Veturi	S. P. Balasubrahmanyam, Chitra	4:50
4.	"Shukkesi Pakkesi"	Veturi	S. P. Balasubrahmanyam, Chitra	4:27
5.	"Kanne Pettaro"	Bhuvanachandra	S. P. Balasubrahmanyam	4:40
6.	"Priya Ragaaley"	Bhuvanachandra	S. P. Balasubrahmanyam, Chitra	6:06
Total length:				30:34

== Remakes ==
Year	Film	Cast	Director	Language	Notes
1997	Judwaa	Salman Khan	David Dhawan	Hindi	
1997	Cheluva	V. Ravichandran	V. Ravichandran	Kannada	
2017	Judwaa 2	Varun Dhawan	David Dhawan	Hindi	

== Reception ==
Griddaluru Gopalrao of Zamin Ryot on his review dated 6 May 1994, appreciated the way the director moulded the characters. He noted that the fast-paced screenplay generated humour in nearly every scene. The film was dubbed in Tamil under the same title.

== Awards ==
Nandi Awards – 1994

- Best Music Director – Raj–Koti
- Best Cinematographer - S. Gopal Reddy
- Best Editor - Ravindra Babu

== See also ==
- Twin telepathy
