= Zameer: The Awakening of a Soul =

- Poster
- Directed by: Rajat Rawail
- Written by: Rumi Jaffery
- Produced by: Ravi Vachani
- Starring: Sanjay Kapoor; Shilpa Shetty; Satyajeet; Kader Khan; Paresh Rawal
- Cinematography: Najeeb Khan
- Edited by: Mukund Chowdhry
- Music by: Anand–Milind
- Production company: Weston Films
- Distributed by: Tips Films
- Release date: 16 May 1997
- Running time: 159 mins
- Country: India
- Language: Hindi

Zameer: The Awakening of a Soul is a 1997 Indian Hindi-language drama film directed by Rajat Rawail and written by Rumi Jaffery, starring Sanjay Kapoor and Shilpa Shetty. It premiered on 16 May 1997 in Mumbai.

== Cast ==
- Sanjay Kapoor as Kishan
- Shilpa Shetty as Roma Khurana
- Paresh Rawal as Raja Gajraj Singh
- Laxmikant Berde as Beparwah
- Om Puri as Jaichand Marwah
- Gulshan Grover as Ranjit Khurana
- Satyajeet Puri as Satyakam
- Kader Khan as Astrologer Ram Prasad
- Shakti Kapoor as Chedhi Lal
- Asrani as Babu
- Yunus Parvez as Minister Saxena
- Kulbhushan Kharbanda as Teacher Acharya
- Arif Khan as Vikram (Gajraj's brother)

== Soundtrack ==
Lyrics by Sameer.

#	Title	Singer(s)
1	"Abhi Abhi Aayee Jawaani"	Alka Yagnik
2	"Dekho To Palat Ke"	Abhijeet, Poornima
3	"Laila Laila Laila"	Kumar Sanu, Alka Yagnik
4	"Mujhe Ek Ladki"	Kumar Sanu, Sadhana Sargam
5	"Tak Taka Tak"	Udit Narayan, Alka Yagnik
6	"Tere Nagme"	Kumar Sanu, Alka Yagnik
7	"Tune Pyar Ka Jaadu"	Kumar Sanu, Alka Yagnik
