= Rajat Rawail =

Indian film director and actor

- Born: 19 June 1972 (age 54); Mumbai, Maharashtra, India
- Occupations: Producer, director, actor
- Years active: 1989–present
- Relatives: H. S. Rawail (grandfather) Rahul Rawail (uncle)

Rajat Rawail is an Indian film producer, director and actor working in the Hindi film industry. He is best known as the producer of films such as No Problem (2010) and Ready (2011).

== Early life and family ==
Rawail was born and brought up in Mumbai. He is the grandson of legendary filmmaker H. S. Rawail and the nephew of film director Rahul Rawail He completed his schooling from Maneckji Cooper School, Juhu, Mumbai in 1987.

== Career ==
Rawail started his career as an assistant director to director Ramesh Sippy. Starting with Bhrashtachar (1989), Rawail worked with Sippy in Akayla (1991) followed by Zamaana Deewana (1995). Subsequently, he has worked as a producer and co-producer for Hindi films like Ready, No Problem, Shortkut - The Con is On, Run and Anjaam.

As a producer he co-produced Salman Khan starrer Ready (2011), a remake of 2008 Telugu film by the same name, and No Problem. He had been planning to make a remake of Kaalia, but later dropped the idea

He made his acting debut in Salman Khan starrer, Bodyguard (2011) playing a fun loving character, Tsunami Singh. In 2013, he became a contestant in the reality TV Show Bigg Boss 7.

== Personal life ==
He is married to Bhavna Dhowan Rawail, and the couple has a daughter named Gehna.

== Filmography ==
=== Films ===
Year	Title	Director	Producer
1994	Anjaam		Associate
1997	Zameer: The Awakening of a Soul	Yes	
2001	Dil Ne Phir Yaad Kiya	Yes	
2009	Short Kut		Yes
2010	No Problem		Yes
2011	Ready		Yes

=== As actor ===
Year	Title	Role	Notes
2011	Bodyguard	Tsunami Singh	
2012	Gali Gali Chor Hai	Bacchu Gulkand	
2012	Second Marriage Dot Com		
2013	Policegiri	Toto	
2014	Desi Magic	Kimtee Singh	
2017	Judwaa 2	Jewellery Shop Owner	
2019	Fixerr	Vicky Kapoor	Web series released on ALTBalaji & ZEE5
2020	Coolie No.1	Waiter (at the Resort)	
2026	Hai Jawani Toh Ishq Hona Hai	Bartender	

=== Television ===
Year	Name	Role	Notes	Ref
2013	Bigg Boss 7	Contestant	Entered Day 1, Evicted Day 14	
