= DJ Aqeel =

Popular Indian DJ, singer and composer

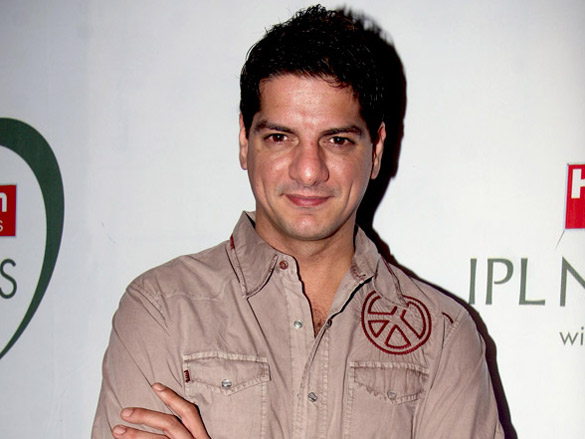
- Born: Aqeel Ali; May 21, 1979 (age 47); Mumbai, India
- Occupations: Indian DJ and Composer
- Years active: 2000–present
- Spouse: Farah Khan Ali (m. 1999; div. 2023)
- Children: 2
- Relatives: Sanjay Khan (ex-father-in-law); Zayed Khan (ex-brother-in-law)

DJ Aqeel (born Aqeel Ali) is an Indian DJ and composer.

== Biography ==
=== Family ===
Aqeel married Farah Khan, who is the daughter of actor Sanjay Khan, and elder sister of Sussanne Khan and Bollywood actor Zayed Khan, on 20 February 1999. The couple has two children, son Azaan (born 2002) and daughter Fizaa (born 2005).

=== Nightclubs owned ===
He used to own the Hype Nightclub in Atria Mall in Worli, Mumbai, also in Delhi's Hotel Shangri-La and in Ludhiana known as Urban Hara (Hype).

== Discography ==
=== Singles and collaborations ===
- Shake It Daddy Mix77
- Tu Hai Wahi
- 'Fanaa for you' in the movie Fanaa
- 'My Dil Goes Mmmm (English Club Mix)' and 'My Dil Goes Mmmm (Instrumental)' in the movie Salaam Namaste
- Gal Ban Gayi Remix T-Series
- Ek Do Teen (remix) for movie : Desi Magic
- "Ye Waada Raha (remix)"
- "Nihaal Ho Gayi (remix)"
- "Aap Se Mausiiquii (Tropical Mix)" for Album Aap Se Mausiiquii
- "Dil Disco Karein (Remix)" for Album Surroor 2021
- Livin' La Vida Loca

== Albums ==
- Aur Ek Haseena Thi (T-Series)
- The Daddy Mix (UMI-10)
- The return to the Daddy Mix (UMI-10)
- Ek Hasina Thi (UMI-10)
- DJ Aqeel Forever (Saregama)
- Don Remix (UMI-10)
- DJ Aqeel Forever 2 (2012) (Saregama)
- DJ Aqeel Forever 3 (2014) (Saregama)
- DJ Aqeel Disco 82
