= Judwaa 2 =

2017 Indian film by David Dhawan

- Theatrical release poster
- Directed by: David Dhawan
- Screenplay by: Yunus Sajawal; Sajid-Farhad (dialogues)
- Based on: Hello Brother by E. V. V. Satyanarayana
- Produced by: Sajid Nadiadwala
- Starring: Varun Dhawan; Jacqueline Fernandez; Taapsee Pannu; Anupam Kher; Sachin Khedekar; Zakir Hussain
- Cinematography: Ayananka Bose
- Edited by: Ritesh Soni
- Music by: Score: Sandeep Shirodkar; Songs: Sajid–Wajid; Meet Bros; Sandeep Shirodkar; Anu Malik
- Production company: Nadiadwala Grandson Entertainment
- Distributed by: Fox Star Studios
- Release date: 29 September 2017
- Running time: 149 minutes
- Country: India
- Language: Hindi
- Budget: ₹60 crore
- Box office: ₹227.59 crore

Judwaa 2 (transl. Twins 2) is a 2017 Indian Hindi-language action comedy film directed by David Dhawan. A reboot of the 1997 film Judwaa, itself a remake of the Telugu film Hello Brother (1994), which itself was inspired by the Jackie Chan-starrer 1992 film Twin Dragons, the film stars Varun Dhawan playing twins Raja and Prem opposite Jacqueline Fernandez and Taapsee Pannu. Produced by Nadiadwala Grandson Entertainment, Judwaa 2 was released on 29 September 2017 to negative reviews from critics. Nevertheless, it was a box office success and 4th highest grossing film of the year.

== Plot ==
While flying back to Mumbai, Rajeev Malhotra meets Charles, a criminal. Malhotra then rushes to the hospital where his wife has given birth to Twin sons. The doctor explains that when the twins are near each other, their reflexes operate simultaneously.

Malhotra has the authorities at the hospital waiting to arrest Charles. In the scuffle, Charles kidnaps one of the twins and leaves him at the train tracks. Charles is arrested and is sentenced to twenty years in prison. The police advises Malhotra to take his wife and Prem and leave India, so they move to London, England. The other twin is found by a woman named Kashibai and she raises him as her son in Mumbai, and names him Raja.

Twenty years later, Charles is almost about to be released from jail. Prem has grown up to be a kind and gentle Hindu and Christian boy who aspires to be a musician. He is thrashed and bullied by an upperclassman, Rocky, on his first day of college and is pitied by Samaira. Samaira is impressed by Prem's musical talents and asks him to come to her house and teach her music.

At the same time, Raja has grown up to be a fun-loving young man and staunch devotee of Ganpati Bappa, growing alongside his friend Nandu in the slums. One day, he gets in brawl with Alex, a local goon's head, at the festivities for Ganesh Chaturti. Raja is warned to take Nandu and get out of India for a few days because Alex's goons will go after them. Raja and Nandu illegally fly to London and meet Alishka on the flight. Raja starts dating Alishka and Prem begins dating Samaira.

Now that Raja and Prem are both in London, their reflexes start operating simultaneously, and this creates a lot of confusion for the both of them and their girlfriends. They are also mistaken for each other by many people in the city.

One day, after Raja and Nandu save Malhotra from an accident, they find Alex and his uncle and discover that Alex lost his memory after that incident. Raja and Prem finally meet each other. They do not realize that they are twins and conclude that they only share the same face.

Alex regains his memory and bring Raja and Nandu to Charles, who is Alex's dad. Charles holds Nandu hostage demanding Malhotra in exchange. Raja finally discovers that he and Prem are twins. Prem, disguised as Raja, brings Malhotra to Charles.

Raja arrives and beats up all of his goons. Alex's uncle locks himself with Raja. But soon, Raja's reflexes reciprocate helping Prem beat Alex, making Alex lose his memory again. Furious, Raja and Prem find their father tied to a bomb and later deactivate it after Raja's fluke. The Malhotra family is finally reunited and Prem marries Samaira while Raja marries Alishka. They meet Raja and Prem outside who dance with them.

== Cast ==
- Varun Dhawan as (dual role):
  - Raja Malhotra; Rajeev and Ankita's elder son; Alishka's husband
  - Prem Malhotra; Rajeev and Ankita's younger son; Raja's brother; Samara's husband
    - Sartaj Kakkar as Young Raja and Prem
- Taapsee Pannu as Samara Malhotra (nee Jain); Prem's wife
- Jacqueline Fernandez as Alishka Malhotra (nee Bakshi); Raja's wife
- Anupam Kher as Balraj Bakshi
- Sachin Khedekar as Rajeev Malhotra; Ankita's husband; Raja and Prem's father
- Prachi Shah as Ankita Malhotra; Rajeev's wife; Raja and Prem's mother
- Upasana Singh as Manmeet Jain
- Rajpal Yadav as Nandu; Raja's friend
  - Aryan Prajapati as young Nandu
- Vivan Bhatena as Alex Jones
- Zakhir Hussain as Charles Jones
- Manoj Joshi as Mama
- Manoj Pahwa as Sharafat Ali
- Manoj Anand as Plane Passenger
- Atul Sharma as Shopper
- Donna Preston as Nancy
- Hiten Patel as Alex's Henchman
- Pippa Hughes as Dancer
- Pavan Malhotra as Officer Kuldeep Dhillon, London Police
- Ali Asgar as Dr. Manoj Lulla
- Vikas Verma as Rocky
- Johnny Lever as Pappu Passport
- Rajat Rawail as London Jewellery Showroom Owner
- Vineet Sharma as Officer
- Naman Shri as Taxi driver
- Khushal Pawar as Simcard
- Thiago Juliaci as extra

Special appearance

- Salman Khan as Raja & Prem of Judwaa

== Development ==
David Dhawan described the film as a reboot of Judwaa. He said, "I was not writing a new script. There are some 8 – 10 scenes from Judwaa that I loved and that made me make this film."

Ayananka Bose is the cinematographer of the film. The film has been edited by Ritesh Soni and the production designer of the film is Rajat Poddar. The screenplay has been written by Yunus Sajawal and the dialogues have been penned by Sajid-Farhad.

== Soundtrack ==
Judwaa 2

Soundtrack album by Sajid–Wajid, Meet Bros, Sandeep Shirodkar and Anu Malik
- Released: 12 September 2017
- Recorded: 2016–2017
- Genre: Feature film soundtrack
- Length: 16:05
- Language: Hindi
- Label: T-Series
- Producer: Sajid Nadiadwala
External audio
- Audio Jukebox on YouTube

The music of the film was composed by Sajid–Wajid, Meet Bros, Sandeep Shirodkar and Anu Malik while lyrics were written by Dev Kohli, Danish Sabri and Sonu Saggu. Malik recreated two songs from Judwaa, "Oonchi Hai Building" and "Chalti Hai Kya 9 Se 12" along with Shirodkar and were released on 25 August and 7 September 2017 as singles. The song Suno Ganpati Bappa Morya which is sung by Amit Mishra was released on 31 August 2017. The album was released by T-Series on 12 September 2017.

Track listing
No.	Title	Lyrics	Music	Singer(s)	Length
1.	"Chalti Hai Kya 9 Se 12"	Dev Kohli	Sandeep Shirodkar, Anu Malik	Dev Negi, Neha Kakkar	4:21
2.	"Suno Ganpati Bappa Morya"	Danish Sabri	Sajid–Wajid	Amit Mishra	4:39
3.	"Lift Teri Bandh Hai"	Dev Kohli	Sandeep Shirodkar, Anu Malik	Anu Malik, Neha Kakkar	3:24
4.	"Aa To Sahi"	Sonu Saggu	Meet Bros	Meet Bros, Neha Kakkar, Rap: Roach Killa	3:41
Total length:					16:05

== Critical reception ==
Judwaa 2 received negative reviews from critics for its acting, writing and overall humor but it was a box office success.

On review aggregator website Rotten Tomatoes Judwaa 2 has an approval score of 33% based on 12 reviews. Meena Iyer of The Times of India gave the film a rating of 3 out of 5 and said that the film is "basically innocent fun meant to pander to the child in you." Rohit Vats of Hindustan Times gave the film a rating of 2 out of 5 and said that, "Judwaa 2, like the original, isn’t a piece of art, in fact it’s mediocre, but it’s that one film which may lift your mood. At 149-minutes, this slapstick comedy has some really laugh-worthy moments." Raja Sen of NDTV criticized Varun Dhawan for not being his spontaneous self and instead making an attempt to act like Salman Khan. The critic called this film, which is a remake of Judwaa, "a weak cover version" and gave it a rating of 1.5 out of 5. Rajeev Masand of News18 gave the film a rating of 2 out of 5 and said that, "There’s no question that if there had to be a remake of Judwaa, it had to have Varun Dhawan. The more important question is – did there really have to be a remake of Judwaa in the first place?".

Sukanya Verma of Rediff gave the film a rating of 2 out of 5 saying that, "Judwaa 2’s balloon of recycled gas soon goes phus (deflates) and what’s left is tedious buffoonery of the brainless, for the brainless and by the brainless". Rohit Bhatnagar of Deccan Chronicle found the movie to be "illogical yet enjoyable" and gave it a rating of 3 out of 5. Sarita A Tanwar of DNA India gave the film a rating of 3 out of 5 saying that, "Judwaa 2 is a lot of unadulterated old-school fun. Watch it for its brazen humour and Varun Dhawan’s spectacular act." Uday Bhati of Live Mint commented on the film saying that, "‘Judwaa 2’ is a cringeworthy reboot of the 1997 David Dhawan comedy." Bollywood Hungama gave the film a rating of 3.5 out of 5 saying that, "On the whole, JUDWAA 2, despite all the goofs, flaws and clichés, comes across as a decent paisa-vasool (worth your money) entertainer."

== See also ==
- Twin telepathy
- Bhaijaan Elo Re, 2018 Bengali remake
