= O Saathi =

2018 Ballad song performed by Arko

- Official song cover

Song by Atif Aslam

from the album Baaghi 2
- Released: 9 March 2018
- Studio: AMV Studios
- Genre: Filmi, Romantic
- Length: 4:12
- Label: T-Series
- Songwriter: Arko Pravo Mukherjee
- Producer: Sajid Nadiadwala

Atif Aslam singles chronology
| "Sehmi Hai Dhadkan" (2018) | "O Saathi" (2018) | "Selfish" (2018) |

"O Saathi" (transl. O my friend) is a song from the 2018 Bollywood film Baaghi 2. Pakistani singer Atif Aslam sang the song written and composed by Arko Pravo Mukherjee.

== Release ==
The music video was released on 9 March 2018 by T-Series on YouTube. It has received over 250 million views on YouTube as of October 2022. Lyrical video has received over 470 million views as of October 2022.

== Music video ==
The song's music video features Tiger Shroff and Disha Patani. Set in a college, it shows Tiger pursuing the very shy Disha in every possible way. Whenever she sees him, she stops her work, showing how they fall in love.

== Credits and personnel ==
- Song – O Saathi
- Singer – Atif Aslam
- Music & Lyrics – Arko
- Additional Vocals – Payal Dev
- Programming & Arrangement – Aditya Dev
- Guitars – Krishna Pradhan
- Flutes – Tejas Vinchurkar
- Musicians Recorded by – Rahul Sharma at AMV Studios
- Vocals recorded at Siena Studios
- Dubai Mix – Aditya Dev
- Master – Eric Pillai
- Label: T-Series

Note: Atif Aslam's name was removed from the credits of the song due to ban on Pakistani artists.

== Accolades ==
| No. | Award | Category | Result |
|---|---|---|---|
| 1 | 11th Mirchi Music Awards | Listeners' Choice Song of the Year | Won |
