= Singham (soundtrack) =

Singham (Original Motion Picture Soundtrack)

Soundtrack album by Ajay–Atul
- Released: 19 June 2011
- Recorded: 2010–2011
- Genre: Feature film soundtrack
- Length: 27:10
- Label: T-Series
- Producer: Ajay–Atul

Ajay–Atul chronology
| Atta Ga Baya (2010) | Singham (Original Motion Picture Soundtrack) (2011) | My Friend Pinto (2011) |

Singham (Original Motion Picture Soundtrack) is the soundtrack album to the 2011 film of the same name directed by Rohit Shetty starring Ajay Devgn, Prakash Raj and Kajal Aggarwal. The soundtrack featured six songs composed by Ajay–Atul with lyrics written by Swanand Kirkire. It was released through the T-Series label on 19 June 2011 to mixed-to-positive reception from music critics.

== Background ==
The duo Ajay–Atul composed the film's soundtrack in their return to Hindi cinema—they worked on Gayab (2004), Viruddh and Vaah! Life Ho Toh Aisi! (both 2005), but their financial underperformance restricted from numerous offers in Bollywood. Post the success of Jogwa (2009), for which they received National Film Award for Best Music Direction, the duo was signed by Sanjay Leela Bhansali for My Friend Pinto (2011) and subsequently by Karan Johar for Agneepath (2012). Singham was the third film the duo signed, but the delay of the other two films made this their first release; it was the duo's first mainstream Bollywood film. Due to the big canvas being provided, the duo worked with themes on heroism and cinematic grandeur. The duo composed three original songs for the film, which were also remixed by Abhijit Vaghani as a part of the soundtrack.

== Reception ==
The album received generally mixed-to-positive reviews from music critics. Joginder Tuteja of Bollywood Hungama awarded the album two stars out of five and said "Singham turns out to be a fine album though one does feel that there could have been much more than just three songs here [...] given the fact that the film is not quite a musical and the focus would be primarily on pushing its action flavour, the album would find it tough to make much of a mark commercially." Tanuj Manchanda of Planet Bollywood gave the album five and a half stars calling it as a "satisfactory" album that helps in "enhancing the film's narrative." Karthik Srinivasan of Milliblog wrote "If there's anything going against this short, highly listenable album, it may only be your awareness of Ajay-Atul's previous, superior Marathi repertoire." Vipin Nair of Music Aloud rated six-and-a-half stars and wrote "A soundtrack which, but for the title song, is hardly reflective of the prodigious talent the national award-winning duo is. But to be fair to Ajay-Atul, Singham might not be a movie worthy of a super-outstanding soundtrack."

== Use in sequels ==
The title track was incorporated by Meet Bros Anjjan as "Singham Returns Theme" for Singham Returns (2014), and Ravi Basrur as "Singham Again Title Track" for Singham Again (2024). The Singham Again version of the track was removed from YouTube after T-Series issued a YouTube copyright strike to the makers and Saregama—the label which acquired the film's music rights—and was later re-released without the original theme.

== Track listing ==
Singham (Original Motion Picture Soundtrack) track listing
| No. | Title | Singer(s) | Length |
|---|---|---|---|
| 1. | "Maula Maula" | Kunal Ganjawala, Richa Sharma | 4:04 |
| 2. | "Saathiya" (remix) | Shreya Ghoshal, Ajay Gogavale | 5:00 |
| 3. | "Singham" | Sukhwinder Singh | 5:50 |
| 4. | "Saathiya" | Shreya Ghoshal, Ajay Gogavale | 5:10 |
| 5. | "Maula Maula" (remix) | Kunal Ganjawala, Richa Sharma | 3:44 |
| 6. | "Singham" (Remix) | Sukhwinder Singh | 3:23 |
| Total length: | | | 27:10 |

== Accolades ==
Accolades for Singham (Original Motion Picture Soundtrack)
| Award ceremony | Category | Result | Ref. |
|---|---|---|---|
| 4th Mirchi Music Awards | Best Background Score of the Year | Nominated | |
