= Singham Returns =

2014 Indian film by Rohit Shetty

- Theatrical release poster
- Directed by: Rohit Shetty
- Screenplay by: Yunus Sajawal
- Dialogues by: Sajid-Farhad
- Story by: Rohit Shetty
- Based on: Ekalavyan by Shaji Kailas
- Produced by: Reliance Entertainment; Ajay Devgn; Rohit Shetty
- Starring: Ajay Devgn; Kareena Kapoor Khan; Amole Gupte; Anupam Kher
- Cinematography: Dudley
- Edited by: Steven H. Bernard
- Music by: Score: Amar Mohile; Songs: Jeet Gannguli; Ankit Tiwari; Meet Bros Anjjan; Yo Yo Honey Singh
- Production companies: Reliance Entertainment; Ajay Devgn FFilms; Rohit Shetty Picturez
- Distributed by: Reliance Entertainment
- Release date: 15 August 2014
- Running time: 142 minutes
- Country: India
- Language: Hindi
- Budget: ₹100 crore
- Box office: ₹220.5 crore

Singham Returns is a 2014 Indian Hindi-language action film co-written and directed by Rohit Shetty and produced by Ajay Devgn FFilms, Reliance Entertainment and Rohit Shetty Picturez. It is a sequel to the 2011 film Singham and second installment in Shetty's Cop Universe. Ajay Devgn reprises his role as Bajirao Singham, alongside Kareena Kapoor Khan, replacing Kajal Aggarwal.

The film was released theatrically worldwide on 15 August 2014, during India's Independence Day. Upon release, it broke several opening day records. Made on a budget of ₹70 crore, the film performed commercially well at the box office with a global gross of ₹219 crore, and stood up as one of the highest-grossing Indian films of 2014.

Devgn reprised his role as a cameo for Simmba (2018) and Sooryavanshi (2021), the next films in the Cop Universe. In December 2022, a third film in the series titled Singham Again began pre-production, and was released on 1 November 2024, coinciding with Diwali.

== Plot ==
Bajirao Singham, who is now a DCP, gets transferred to Mumbai and discovers that one of his team members, Mahesh Jadhav, is found dead inside an ambulance with massive bags of money. Singham decides to unearth the truth behind it and in this process, he collides with a powerful and fraudulent religious leader, Satyaraj "Babaji" Chander, who has high-profile connections with corrupt politicians, including the ruling party's secretary minister Prakash Rao. During this period, Gurukant "Guruji" Acharya, the veteran leader of the ruling party who has been a teacher to Chief Minister Vikram Adhikari and Singham, is killed by Babaji's henchmen due to Guruji's opposition to Rao's scheme, even though Singham was present at the scene, making him vow vengeance. Because of this, he has to pretend that he has resigned in front of his family. Due to this, his father Manikrao asks him and his childhood friend, Avni Kamat, to come to their hometown, Shivgarh.

After some time, Singham and Avni fall in love with each other. However, it is then revealed that Singham hasn't resigned and came to Shivgarh on an undercover mission to find evidence against Babaji. At Wadhavpur, he catches Babaji's henchman named Altaf Khan who distributes the black money in order to bribe the voters. While coming to Mumbai with a convoy, it is attacked by Babaji's henchmen and Altaf is shot and slips into coma. On the other hand, Rao harms all of Guruji's candidates, including Avni, because her in-hiding brother Kishore is one of the candidates. Singham manages to save Avni and during a political event, the female family members of the candidates slap Rao due to this act. Altaf soon recovers and testifies against him. Singham arrests Babaji and Rao, leading to riots. However, some party workers execute an attack outside the court, killing the witnesses. This causes Babaji and Rao to go scot-free due to lack of evidence. Realizing the futility of the law, Singham and his team reach their house without wearing their police uniforms, joined in by police from all around Mumbai.

They successfully fight Babaji and Rao's men. Singham's team storm inside Babaji's house, and comically torture Babaji and Rao by firing a live round into both of their buttocks each. The wounded and humiliated Rao and Baba tell the truth, their confessions secretly being filmed and broadcast on live television and radio. A few weeks later, Guruji's party wins the elections. While being transported to jail in a van, Rao and Baba once again threaten and taunt Singham. Suddenly, the van stops and the driver walks away. A water tanker crashes into the van, sending it into a power station, killing both of them. One of Singham's allies, Inspector Dev Phadnis tells the media that there was a brake failure, and the incident is deemed as an accident (a plan that was fabricated by Singham which resembled the way Mahesh was killed).

== Cast ==
- Ajay Devgn as DCP Bajirao Singham
- Kareena Kapoor as Avni Kamat
- Amole Gupte as Satyaraj Chander a.k.a. "Babaji"
- Anupam Kher as Central Minister Gurukant Acharya a.k.a. "Guruji"
- Dayanand Shetty as Senior inspector Daya
- Sharat Saxena as Mumbai Police Commissioner Shiv Rathod
- Vineet Sharma as Inspector Dev Phadnis
- Mahesh Manjrekar as Vikram Adhikari, Chief Minister of Maharashtra
- Sonalee Kulkarni as Menka, Singham's childhood friend
- Zakir Hussain as Cabinet Minister Prakash Rao
- Ashwini Kalsekar as Journalist Meera Shorey
- Govind Namdev as Manikrao Singham, Bajirao's father
- Meghna Vaidya as Lata Singham, Bajirao's mother
- Pankaj Tripathi as Altaf Khan
- Uday Tikekar as Mr. Kamat, Avni & Kishore's father
- Sameer Dharmadhikari as Kishor Kamat, Avni's brother
- Sarita Joshi as Mrs. Jadhav, Mahesh's mother
- Smita Tambe as Usha Jadhav, Mahesh's wife
- Shubhangi Latkar as Mrs. Kamat, Avni & Kishore's mother
- Jitendra Joshi as Ashish, Menka's boyfriend
- Deepraj Rana as Rtd. Captain Sunil Prabhat
- Sachin Nayak as Bhola Singh
- Shriswara as Neeta Parmar
- Rakesh Kukreti as Mr. Parmar, Neeta's husband
- Ganesh Yadav as Head Constable Mahesh Jadhav
- Chhaya Kadam as Slum Dweller
- Ujjwal Gauraha as News Reporter
- Krishna Kotian as a Constable
- Aashish Warang as a Sub-Inspector
- Umakant Patil as an Assistant Sub-Inspector
- Amit Verma as Mayank Anand
- Yo Yo Honey Singh in a special appearance in the song "Aata Majhi Satakli"

== Production ==
Director Rohit Shetty announced his thoughts on making a sequel to one of his finest movies Singham (2011). After filming Chennai Express with Shah Rukh Khan, Shetty reportedly has begun filming for Singham 2 with the lead star Ajay Devgn. Filming was expected to go on floors by December 2013 after Shetty's Chennai Express was released, starting the work of Singham 2's pre-production along with that of his another film which incidentally is a sequel too, Golmaal 4.

However, Devgn, the lead of the film, canned 20 days of photography for his other film Action Jackson, directed by Prabhu Deva and start another leg of the shoot from 10 November 2013. After several delays owing to Devgn's shooting of Action Jackson concurrently the principal photography for a 15-day schedule of the film started from 15 May 2014 in Goa. The shoot was held in few places like streets of Siolim, a village located at a distance of about 25 Kilometres from Panaji. The ones which were held in Panaji were mostly indoor ones.

== Soundtrack ==
Singham Returns

Soundtrack album by Jeet Gannguli, Meet Bros Anjjan, Ankit Tiwari and Yo Yo Honey Singh
- Released: 7 August 2014
- Genre: Feature Film Soundtrack
- Length: 20:39
- Language: Hindi
- Label: T-Series
External audio
- Audio Jukebox on YouTube

Jeet Gannguli chronology
CityLights (2014)	Singham Returns (2014)	Alone (2014)

Meet Bros Anjjan chronology
Kick (2014)	Singham Returns (2014)	Sharafat Gayi Tel Lene (2014)

Ankit Tiwari chronology
Ek Villain (2014)	Singham Returns (2014)	PK (2014)

Yo Yo Honey Singh chronology
Kick (2014)	Singham Returns (2014)	The Shaukeens (2014)

Singles from Singham Returns
- 1. "Kuch Toh Hua Hai" Released: 25 July 2014; 2. "Aata Majhi Satakli" Released: 1 August 2014

The soundtrack for the film was composed by Jeet Gannguli, Meet Bros Anjjan, Ankit Tiwari and Yo Yo Honey Singh. All the composers composed one song each. The soundtrack album contains four songs and one remix. The first single track "Kuch Toh Hua Hai" sung by Ankit Tiwari and Tulsi Kumar was released on 25 July 2014. Another single "Aata Majhi Satakli" sung and composed by Yo Yo Honey Singh was released on 1 August 2014. The soundtrack album was released by T-Series on 7 August 2014.

=== Track listing ===
No.	Title	Lyrics	Music	Singer(s)	Length
1.	"Sun Le Zara"	Sandeep Nath	Jeet Gannguli	Arijit Singh	04:51
2.	"Singham Returns Theme"	Shabbir Ahmed	Meet Bros Anjjan	Meet Bros Anjjan, Mika Singh	04:38
3.	"Kuch Toh Hua Hai"	Sandeep Nath, Abhendra Kumar Upadhyay	Ankit Tiwari	Ankit Tiwari, Tulsi Kumar	05:07
4.	"Singham Returns Remix" (MBA Swag)	Shabbir Ahmed	Meet Bros Anjjan	Meet Bros Anjjan, Mika Singh	02:49
5.	"Aata Majhi Satakli"	Yo Yo Honey Singh	Yo Yo Honey Singh	Yo Yo Honey Singh, Mamta Sharma, Nitu Choudhry	03:14
Total length:					20:39

== Reception ==
Before its release on the eve of Independence Day on 15 August, a right-wing Hindu organisation, HJS wrote to the CBFC asking that the film be banned on grounds of the depiction of Hindu saints in a bad light thereby hurting the religious sentiments. Shetty denied the allegation stating that he has never made anything controversial in his career.

Singham Returns received mixed reviews from Indian critics. On the review aggregator website Rotten Tomatoes, 31% of 13 critics' reviews are positive, with an average rating of 4.5/10. Taran Adarsh of Bollywood Hungama gave it 4 stars and said "The film is a complete mass entertainer with power-packed drama, hi-intensity dialogue and towering performances as its aces. The brand value attached to it coupled with a long weekend will help the film reap a harvest and rule the box office in days to come." Rohit Khilnani of India Today gave 3 stars and said "Singham Returns is strictly for fans". Anupama Chopra of Hindustan Times gave the film 2.5 out of 5 stars and said, "This is one of Shetty's least cartoonish films. Which doesn't mean he's going for Ardh Satya-style realism. We’ve still got the signature cars blowing up and some terrific action sequences on the streets of Mumbai. But these sequences have a gritty texture." Shweta Kaushal of Hindustan Times gave two stars and said "Watch Singham Returns for the action, not comedy". Shubra Gupta of the Indian Express gave 1.5 stars and said "The sequel to 'Singham' is chock full of the usual car on jeep action. Explosions go off at regular intervals. Shootouts – one really well shot – occur frequently." Rajeev Masand of CNN-IBN gave 2.5 stars and said "The predictable story tires you out eventually". Raja Sen of Rediff gave the film 2.5 out of 5 stars and said, "The problem with Singham (and, for that matter, any of these uninteresting modern day star-vehicles) is that the hero roams about unchallenged, unopposed, unexciting. The hero himself ain't bad – for whatever that's worth. Ajay Devgn wears his scowl like a wrestler would wear a championship belt, proud and unsmiling. He's got a fine, old-school swagger and his ass-kicking looks relatively authentic."

== Box office ==
Singham Returns nett collection over ₹321 million (US$3.4 million) on the first day of its release in India. Domestic nett of Singham Returns was ₹1.41 billion (US$15 million). The film earned a final worldwide gross collection of ₹220.5 crore.

== Game ==
An official game based on this film has been released by Zapak Mobile Games Pvt. Ltd., for Android mobile phone users.

== Sequel ==
In December 2022, after years of planning, Rohit Shetty finally began the pre-production of Singham Again, the third film for Singham. It stars Ajay Devgn, Kareena Kapoor Khan and Deepika Padukone who will portray a female cop in the film, whereas Ranveer Singh and Akshay Kumar reprise their respective eponymous roles from Simmba and Sooryavanshi. Jackie Shroff reprises his antagonist role as Omar Hafeez from Sooryavanshi (2021). Tiger Shroff joined the crew as ACP Satya. Arjun Kapoor also joined the cast as the main antagonist of the film . In April 2023, the release date was announced as 15 August 2024, exactly 10 years after Singham Returns. However, the film was later delayed to release on Diwali 2024 instead.

== Chapters ==
=== Simmba ===
The 2018 film Simmba, a Hindi adaptation of the Telugu film, Temper, a second chapter of this universe. Simmba stars Ranveer Singh in the titular role as Inspector Sangram Bhalerao aka Simmba, a corrupt cop who after the murder of a girl, changes to honesty, and is directed by Rohit Shetty and produced by Karan Johar's Dharma Productions. It also stars Sara Ali Khan and Sonu Sood in its lead roles while Devgn reprises his role of DCP Bajirao Singham from the previous films.

=== Sooryavanshi ===
The 2021-film, Sooryavanshi, a third chapter of this universe. This film stars Akshay Kumar as another DCP named Veer Sooryavanshi who joins hands with Simmba and Singham to stop a terrorist attack on Mumbai. This film was again directed by Shetty, produced by Johar, Shetty and Reliance Entertainment. Unlike the three previous films, this film had an original story.
