= Rohit Shetty's Cop Universe =

Indian action media franchise

- Official Cop Universe logo
- Created by: Rohit Shetty
- Original work: Singham (2011)
- Owners: Reliance Entertainment; Rohit Shetty Picturez
- Years: 2011–present

Films and television
- Film(s): Singham (2011); Singham Returns (2014); Simmba (2018); Sooryavanshi (2021); Singham Again (2024)
- Web series: Indian Police Force (2024)
- Animated series: Little Singham (2018–present); Smashing Simmba (2020–present); Baby Little Singham (2022–present)

Games
- Video game(s): Singham (2011); Singham Returns: The Game (2014); Little Singham (2018); Little Singham Cricket (2019); Little Singham Cycle Run (2020); Little Singham Super Skater (2021); Little Singham Ludo (2021); Smaashhing Simmba - Skate Rush (2021)

Audio
- Soundtrack(s): Singham; Singham Returns; Simmba; Sooryavanshi; Singham Again

Miscellaneous
- Budget: Total (5 films): est. ₹735–760 crore
- Box office: Total (5 films): est. ₹1,433.54 crore (See More details)

Rohit Shetty's Cop Universe is an Indian media franchise and shared universe created by Rohit Shetty. Previously known simply as the Cop Universe, It consists of media focusing on police officers. The franchise includes films, animated series, video games and television series. The universe was established by crossing over common plot elements, settings, cast, and characters.

The first two films, Singham (2011) and Singham Returns (2014) focus on Bajirao Singham, a law-abiding DCP from Shivgarh who fights for justice. The third, Simmba (2018), focuses on Sangram "Simmba" Bhalerao, a corrupt Inspector from the same town as Bajirao, who takes advantage of his job. The fourth, Sooryavanshi (2021), stars Akshay Kumar as DCP Veer Sooryavanshi. The fifth, Singham Again (2024) brings all the characters together and is loosely based on the Indian epic, Ramayana.

== Development ==
Seeing the success of the Tamil-language film, Singam (2010), directed by Hari, the film rights for the Hindi and Kannada versions were sold by the makers. Reliance Big Pictures, which co-produced the original version, bought the Hindi remake rights and announced in November 2010 that the version would feature Rohit Shetty as director and Ajay Devgn in the lead. Prakash Raj was signed on to reprise his role as the antagonist from the original. In February 2011, Kajal Aggarwal was signed in as the female lead. The movie was named "Singham" (transl. Lion). The film received mixed critical response but the film was declared a 'super hit' at the box office, collecting ₹1,413 million (equivalent to ₹3.2 billion or US$33 million in 2026).

After the commercial success of Singham, Shetty announced that plans were being made to direct a sequel to Singham. The movie was named Singham Returns. Devgn was reprising his role from Singham. However, Kareena Kapoor was cast as the female lead this time. The film received mixed reviews and just like its predecessor, Singham Returns was declared a 'super hit' at the box office collecting ₹2,165.6975 million (equivalent to ₹3.8 billion or US$39 million in 2026).

Following Singham Returns' success, Shetty showed interest in remaking the Telugu film Temper (2015). He stated in an interview, "We have bought the rights of Temper but our film is not exactly a remake. We wanted to take four-five scenes from Temper but we thought it's better to buy the rights." The film was named "Simmba" and Ranveer Singh was cast as Simmba, along with Sara Ali Khan for the female lead. The film received positive reviews and was declared as a 'blockbuster, collecting ₹3,916.825 million (equivalent to ₹5.7 billion or US$59 million in 2026).

In the post-credits scene, the filmmakers revealed the next movie in the cop universe, Sooryavanshi, which cast Akshay Kumar and Katrina Kaif in lead roles. The shooting was wrapped in late 2019, and was heading towards a March 2020 release, however the film was postponed due to COVID-19 pandemic, before it finally released after a year, on 5 November 2021.

== Films ==
Film	Release date	Director	Story By	Ref.
Singham	22 July 2011	Rohit Shetty	Hari	
Singham Returns	15 August 2014	Rohit Shetty	Renji Panicker	
Simmba	28 December 2018	Rohit Shetty	Vakkantham Vamsi	
Sooryavanshi	5 November 2021	Rohit Shetty	Rohit Shetty	
Singham Again	1 November 2024	Rohit Shetty	Kshitij Patwardhan	

=== Singham (2011 film) ===
Bajirao Singham, an honest police officer locks horns with a corrupt politician Jaikant Shikre and decides to bring him to justice.

It is the Hindi remake of the Tamil film Singam. It stars Ajay Devgn as Inspector Bajirao Singham, Kajal Aggarwal as Kavya Bhosle, and Prakash Raj as Jaykant Shikre. It was released on 22 July 2011.

=== Singham Returns (2014 film) ===
DCP Bajirao Singham is assigned to investigate the death of an officer from his team, where he finds that Babaji, a god-man with connections to high-profile connections is behind the crime and sets out to expose him.

The plot was inspired by the Malayalam film Ekalavyan. It stars Devgn as DCP Bajirao Singham, Kareena Kapoor as Avni Kamat, and Amole Gupte as Babaji. It was released on 15 August 2014.

=== Simmba (2018 film) ===
Inspector Sangram Bhalerao, a corrupt officer sets out on a crusade against a smuggler named Durva, whose brothers are responsible for assaulting a woman.

The film is a remake of the Telugu film Temper. It stars Ranveer Singh as Senior Police Inspector Sangram Bhalerao (Simmba), Sara Ali Khan as Shagun Sathe, and Sonu Sood as Durva Ranade. Ajay Devgn and Akshay Kumar appear in cameo appearances, with the former reprising his role of DCP Bajirao Singham, while the latter played another DCP named Veer Sooryavanshi. It was released on 28 December 2018.

Simmba 2 is confirmed to be next installment of the universe

=== Sooryavanshi (2021 film) ===
With an upcoming threat of a terrorist attack in Mumbai, ATS chief Veer Sooryavanshi embarks on a mission to hunt for 600 kgs of missing RDX and the conspiring perpetrators named Riyaaz Hafeez, Mukthar Ansari and Bilal Ahmed.

The film sees Kumar reprising his role of DCP Veer Sooryavanshi, in the lead role, with Katrina Kaif as Ria Sooryavanshi. It was scheduled to release on 30 April 2020 but postponed due to COVID-19. It was released on 5 November 2021 coinciding with Diwali.

=== Singham Again (2024 film) ===
Rohit Shetty confirmed that the shooting of the film began on 16 September 2023. Kareena Kapoor Khan is reprising her role as Avni Kamat Singham. It also introduced Deepika Padukone as DCP Shakti Shetty ("Lady Singham"), Tiger Shroff as Inspector Satya Bali, and Arjun Kapoor as Zubair Hafeez (Danger Lanka), a ruthless criminal in the Cop Universe. Jackie Shroff has reprising his role of Omar Hafeez from Sooryavanshi (2021), Dayanand Shetty as Senior Inspector Daya Shetty. Akshay Kumar as DCP Veer Sooryavanshi (Surya), Salman Khan as ACP Chulbul Pandey and Ranveer Singh as ACP Sangram Bhalerao (Simmba) appear in cameo appearances. It has been produced by Reliance Entertainment, Jio Studios, Ajay Devgn, Akshay Kumar and Rohit Shetty.

== Television series ==
Name	Release date	Director	Story by	Platform	Ref.
Indian Police Force	19 January 2024	Rohit Shetty; Sushwanth Prakash	Rohit Shetty	Amazon Prime Video	

=== Indian Police Force (2024) ===
Indian Police Force stars Sidharth Malhotra as Kabir Malik, Vivek Oberoi as Vikram Bakshi and Shilpa Shetty as Tara Shetty in Delhi Police. The series premiered on Amazon Prime Video on January 19, 2024 and has seven episodes. Rohit Shetty is the showrunner and producer. Shetty worked closely on the script and action scenes of the project.

== Cast and characters ==
=== Films ===
Characters	Actors	Films				
Characters	Actors	Singham (2011)	Singham Returns (2014)	Simmba (2018)	Sooryavanshi (2021)	Singham Again (2024)
DCP Bajirao Singham	Ajay Devgn	Main	Main	Guest	Guest	Main
Inspector / ACP Sangram "Simmba" Bhalerao	Ranveer Singh			Main	Guest	Main
DCP Veer "Surya" Sooryavanshi	Akshay Kumar			Guest	Main	Main
ACP Satya Bali	Tiger Shroff					Main
ACP Chulbul Pandey	Salman Khan					Guest
Kavya G. Bhosle	Kajal Aggarwal	Main				
Avni Kamat Singham	Kareena Kapoor Khan		Main			Main
Shagun Sathe	Sara Ali Khan			Main		
Dr. Ria Sooryavanshi	Katrina Kaif				Main	
DCP Shakti Shetty alias Lady Singham	Deepika Padukone					Main
Jaikant Shikre	Prakash Raj	Main				
Durva Yashwant Ranade	Sonu Sood			Main		
Omar Hafeez	Jackie Shroff				Main	Main
Zubair Hafeez / Danger Lanka	Arjun Kapoor					Main
Satyaraj "Babaji" Chander	Amole Gupte		Main			
Maulana Kader Usmani	Gulshan Grover				Main	
Riyaz Hafeez / Rajbir Rathod	Abhimanyu Singh				Main	Archived footage
Mukhtar Ansari / Vivek Shastri	Nikitin Dheer				Main	
John Mascarenhas	Sikander Kher				Main	
Megha Kadam	Sonali Kulkarni	Main				
Inspector Rakesh Kadam	Sudhanshu Pandey	Guest				
Sub Inspector Santosh Tawde	Siddhartha Jadhav			Main	Guest	
JCP Kabir Shroff	Jaaved Jaaferi				Main	
Gurukant "Guruji" Acharya	Anupam Kher		Main			
Senior Inspector Daya Singh	Dayanand Shetty		Main			Main
Vikram Adhikari	Mahesh Manjrekar		Main			
Head Constable Nityanand Mohile	Ashutosh Rana			Main		
Inspector Tara Manchandani	Niharica Raizada				Main	
Senior Inspector Malvika Gupta	Haelyn Shastri				Main	
Senior Inspector Vivaan Singh	Vivan Bhatena				Main	
Home Minister Raj Jaishankar	Ravi Kishan					Main
ACP Devika Singh	Shweta Tiwari					Main

=== Web Series ===
Characters	Actors	Web Series
Characters	Actors	Indian Police Force (2024)
DCP Kabir Malik	Sidharth Malhotra	Main
JCP Vikram Bakshi	Vivek Oberoi	Main
ATS Chief Tara Shetty	Shilpa Shetty	Main
Rashmi Malik	Isha Talwar	Main
Shruti Bakshi	Shweta Tiwari	Main
R&AW agent Jagtap Singh	Sharad Kelkar	Main
Inspector Rana Virk	Nikitin Dheer	Main

== Additional crew and production details ==
Occupation	Films				
Occupation	Singham (2011)	Singham Returns (2014)	Simmba (2018)	Sooryavanshi (2021)	Singham Again (2024)
Director	Rohit Shetty	Rohit Shetty	Rohit Shetty	Rohit Shetty	Rohit Shetty
Producer(s)	Reliance Entertainment	Ajay Devgn; Rohit Shetty; Reliance Entertainment	Karan Johar; Hiroo Yash Johar; Apoorva Mehta; Rohit Shetty; Reliance Entertainment	Karan Johar; Hiroo Yash Johar; Aruna Bhatia; Rohit Shetty; Akshay Kumar; Reliance Entertainment	Ajay Devgn; Jyoti Deshpande; Rohit Shetty; Reliance Entertainment
Executive Producer	Rohit Chaudhury	George Cameron Romero	Sadashiv Athule	Inderjit Chadha	Ramesh Bokade; Inderjit Chadha; Anuva Gupte; Dipak Mogare
Story	Hari	Shaji Kailas	Puri Jagannadh	Rohit Shetty	Kshitij Patwardhan
Screenplay	Yunus Sajawal	Yunus Sajawal	Yunus Sajawal; Sajid Samji	Yunus Sajawal	Yunus Sajawal
Dialogue writer(s)	Sajid-Farhad	Sajid-Farhad	Sajid-Farhad	Farhad Samji; Sanchit Bedre; Vidhi Ghodgaonkar	Milap Zaveri; Shantanu Shrivastava; Viddhi Ghodgaonkar
Music director(s)	Ajay–Atul	Jeet Gannguli; Ankit Tiwari; Meet Bros; Yo Yo Honey Singh	Tanishk Bagchi; Lijo George–DJ Chetas; Thaman S	Tanishk Bagchi; Lijo George–DJ Chetas; JAM8	Ravi Basrur; Thaman S
Background Score	Amar Mohile	Amar Mohile	Amar Mohile; S. Thaman; Chandan Saxena	Amar Mohile	Ravi Basrur
Director of Photography	Dudley	Dudley	Jomon T. John	Jomon T. John	Girish Kant; Raza Hussain Mehta
Editor	Steven H. Bernard	Steven H. Bernard	Bunty Nagi	Bunty Nagi	Bunty Nagi
Production Designer	Narendra Rahurikar	Narendra Rahurikar	Swapnil Bhalerao; Madhur Madhavan	Swapnil Bhalerao; Madhur Madhavan	Swapnil Bhalerao; Madhur Madhavan
Lyricist(s)	Swanand Kirkire	Sandeep Nath; Shabbir Ahmed; Abhendra Kumar Upadhyay; Yo Yo Honey Singh	Shabbir Ahmed; Rashmi Virag; Kumaar; Kunal Vermaa	Shabbir Ahmed; Rashmi Virag	Swanand Kirkire
Action Director(s)	Rajesh Kannan; Jai Singh Nijjar	Jai Singh Nijjar; Sunil Rodrigues	Sunil Rodrigues	Sunil Rodrigues	Grant Hulley; Sunil Rodrigues
Choreographer(s)	Rajesh Kannan; Ganesh Acharya	Ganesh Acharya; Raju Khan; Chinni Prakash	Ganesh Acharya; Raju Khan	Farah Khan; Ganesh Acharya	–
Production Companies	Reliance Entertainment	Reliance Entertainment; Devgn Films; Rohit Shetty Productions	Reliance Entertainment; Dharma Productions; Rohit Shetty Productions	Reliance Entertainment; Dharma Productions; Cape of Good Films; Rohit Shetty Productions	Reliance Entertainment; Devgn Films; Jio Studios; Cinergy
Distribution	Reliance Entertainment	Eros International	Reliance Entertainment	Reliance Entertainment; PVR Pictures	PVR Pictures
Running Time	143 minutes	142 minutes	158 minutes	145 minutes	144 minutes

== Reception ==
Box office performance

Film	Release date	Budget	Box office revenue
Singham	22 July 2011	₹40 crore (US$8.57 million)	₹157.89 crore (US$33.83 million)
Singham Returns	15 August 2014	₹70 crore (US$11.47 million)	₹220.5 crore (US$36.13 million)
Simmba	28 December 2018	₹80 crore (US$11.7 million)	₹400.19 crore (US$58.52 million)
Sooryavanshi	5 November 2021	₹160 crore (US$21.65 million)	₹294.91 crore (US$39.9 million)
Singham Again	1 November 2024	₹350 crore (equivalent to ₹373 crore or US$39 million in 2026)–₹375 crore (equivalent to ₹399 crore or US$41 million in 2026)	₹367 crore (equivalent to ₹391 crore or US$41 million in 2026)–₹389.64 crore (equivalent to ₹415 crore or US$43 million in 2026)
Total		₹700 crore (US$73 million)–₹725 crore (US$75 million) (five films)	₹1,440.49 crore (US$150 million)–₹1,463.13 crore (US$150 million) (five films)

Critical reception

Title	Rotten Tomatoes
Singham	57% (5.3/10 average rating) (7 reviews)
Singham Returns	31% (4.5/10 average rating) (13 reviews)
Simmba	27% (4.8/10 average rating) (11 reviews)
Sooryavanshi	36% (5/10 average rating) (11 reviews)
Indian Police Force	17% (3.7/10 average rating) (12 reviews)
Singham Again	32% (5.3/10 average rating) (19 reviews)

== In other media ==
=== Animated series ===
An animated series named Little Singham based on Singham was released in 2018. Another animated series Baby Little Singham, which was a prequel of the 2018 animated series Little Singham, released in 2022.

Smashing Simmba, an animated television series based on Simmba was released on 14 November 2020 on Pogo TV.

=== Games ===
Singham, a promotional mobile video game for the 2011 film was released the same year.

A mobile game called Singam Returns: The Game based on Singham Returns was released in 2014 by Zapak Mobile Games for Android. Another Android mobile game was released in 2018 based on the television series, Little Singham in 2018 by Zapak Mobile Games. Other games by Zapak have followed including Little Singham Cricket (2019), Little Singham Cycle Race (2020), Little Singham Super Skater (2021), Little Singham Ludo (2021).

A skateboard running mobile video game based on Smashing Simmba, Smaashhing Simmba - Skate Rush, was released by Zapak in 2021.

== See also ==
- Dhoom (film series)
- Race (film series)
- YRF Spy Universe
