= Devgn Films =

Indian film production company owned by Ajay Devgn

- Type: Limited liability partnership
- Industry: Entertainment
- Founded: 2000
- Founders: Ajay Devgn
- Headquarters: Mumbai, Maharashtra, India
- Key people: Ajay Devgn; Kajol
- Products: Films
- Services: Film production; Film distribution
- Subsidiaries: NY VFXWAALA
- Website: devgnfilms.com

Devgn Films, formerly known as Ajay Devgn FFilms, is an Indian film production and distribution company established by actor Ajay Devgn in 2000. Based in Mumbai, it mainly produces and distributes Hindi films. Devgn Films released its first film, Raju Chacha. The film starred Devgn and Kajol. Raju Chacha received mixed reviews but grossed ₹82.5 million at the box office. In 2015, Devgn started a visual effects company, NY VFXWAALA.

== History ==
In 2000, Devgn Films released its first film, Raju Chacha. The film starred Devgn and Kajol.

In 2008, Devgn co-produced the drama U Me Aur Hum, which marked his directorial debut. Devgn also played the lead role in the film, sharing the screen again with Kajol. The film was written by Devgn himself and three other writers.

In 2009, Devgn released and acted in his home production All the Best: Fun Begins, which was directed by Rohit Shetty and also starring, Sanjay Dutt, Fardeen Khan, Bipasha Basu and Mugdha Godse. The film was released on 16 October 2009. It was rated a hit in India, and is the ninth highest grossing Bollywood film of 2009.

In 2012, Devgn starred in Rohit Shetty's romantic action comedy film Bol Bachchan, which was a joint production by Shree Ashtavinayak Cine Vision Ltd and also featured Abhishek Bachchan, Asin and Prachi Desai in lead roles. The film, made on a budget of ₹700 million (US$7.5 million), is an official remake of the popular 1979 film Gol Maal. The film was released on 6 July 2012 in around 2,575 screens worldwide with 2,700 prints. It received mixed reviews from critics but enjoyed a good opening at the box office. The film supposedly created a record for its advance bookings. Bol Bachchan has become one of the highest-grossing Bollywood film of all time in India. Box Office India declared the film as a "hit" and it grossed ₹1,580 million (US$17 million) worldwide.

That same year Devgn starred in Ashwni Dhir's romantic action comedy film, Son of Sardaar, which was a joint production by Viacom 18 Motion Pictures, also featuring Sanjay Dutt, Sonakshi Sinha and Juhi Chawla in lead roles. The film was released on 13 November 2012. Whilst having competition with the Yash Raj film Jab Tak Hai Jaan, Son of Sardaar managed to do very well at the box office worldwide. Box Office India rated Son of Sardaar as a hit, and an average grosser in the overseas markets. It went on to gross ₹1.5 billion (US$16 million) worldwide.

In 2014, ADFF produced Singham Returns starring Devgn and Kareena Kapoor. In 2016, Devgn produced and starred in Shivaay which is the most expensive film of his production company to date.

In June 2017, it was reported that ADFF will make a television serial based on the life of Baba Ramdev and his success with Patanjali Ayurved.

In late December 2017, ADFF collaborated with Fox Star Studios to produce Total Dhamaal starring Devgn, Riteish Deshmukh, Arshad Warsi, Jaaved Jaaferi, Madhuri Dixit and Anil Kapoor.

In January 2018, ADFF announced film Helicopter Eela that has his wife Kajol in the lead role.

In December 2021, ADFF announced the film Velle that has Sunny Deol's son Karan Deol in the lead role as Rahul, Anya Singh as Riya, also supporting actors Abhay Deol as Rishi Singh, Mouni Roy as Rohini, Zakhir Hussain as R. S. (Riya's father), Vishesh Tiwari as Raju and Savant Singh Premi as Rambo.

== Production ==
=== Films ===
Key
†	Denotes films that have not yet been released

List of Ajay Devgn FFilms film production credits
Year	Title	Director	Language	Notes
1999	Hindustan Ki Kasam	Veeru Devgn	Hindi	Produced under Devgn Films
1999	Dil Kya Kare	Prakash Jha	Hindi	Produced under Devgn Films
2000	Raju Chacha	Anil Devgn	Hindi	Produced under Devgn Films
2005	Blackmail	Anil Devgn	Hindi	Produced under Devgn Entertainment Software
2008	U Me Aur Hum	Ajay Devgn	Hindi	Produced under Devgn Films
2009	All the Best: Fun Begins	Rohit Shetty	Hindi	
2012	Bol Bachchan	Rohit Shetty	Hindi	
2012	Son of Sardar	Ashwni Dhir	Hindi	
2014	Singham Returns	Rohit Shetty	Hindi	
2014	Vitti Dandu	Ganesh Kadam	Marathi	
2016	Parched	Leena Yadav	Hindi	
2016	Shivaay	Ajay Devgn	Hindi	
2018	Aapla Manus	Satish Rajwade	Marathi	
2018	Helicopter Eela	Pradeep Sarkar	Hindi	
2019	Total Dhamaal	Indra Kumar	Hindi	
2019	Singham	Navaniat Singh	Punjabi	
2020	Tanhaji	Om Raut	Hindi	Won—National Film Award for Best Popular Film Providing Wholesome Entertainment
2020	Chhalaang	Hansal Mehta	Hindi	
2021	Tribhanga	Renuka Shahane	Hindi	
2021	The Big Bull	Kookie Gulati	Hindi	
2021	Bhuj: The Pride of India	Abhishek Dudhaiya	Hindi	
2021	Velle	Deven Munjal	Hindi	
2022	Runway 34	Ajay Devgn	Hindi	
2023	Bholaa	Ajay Devgn	Hindi	Co-production with Reliance Entertainment, Dream Warrior Pictures and T-Series (company)
2024	Shaitaan	Vikas Bahl	Hindi	
2024	Singham Again	Rohit Shetty	Hindi	
2025	Maa	Vishal Furia	Hindi	
2025	Son of Sardaar 2	Vijay Kumar Arora	Hindi	
2026	Dhamaal 4	Indra Kumar	Hindi	
2027	Ranger †	Jagan Shakti	Hindi	
2027	Surya Prakash †	Rohit Jugraj Chauhan	Hindi	

== Visual effects ==
=== NY VFXWALA ===
In October 2015, Devgn established a visual effects company called, NY VFXWAALA, which was named after his kids, Nysa and Yug. Apart from home productions, his VFX team have been involved with many major films, such as Prem Ratan Dhan Payo, Tamasha, Bajirao Mastani, Mersal, Dilwale, Force 2 and Simmba. The company won the Best Special Effects award at the 64th National Film Awards for the film Shivaay (2016).

Key
†	Denotes films that have not yet been released

Year	Title	Language	Notes
2014	Singham Returns	Hindi	
2015	Drishyam	Hindi	
2015	Prem Ratan Dhan Payo	Hindi	
2015	Katyar Kaljat Ghusali	Marathi	
2015	Tamasha	Hindi	
2015	Dilwale	Hindi	
2015	Bajirao Mastani	Hindi	
2016	Ranveer Ching Returns	Hindi	Advertisement
2016	Theri	Tamil	
2016	Ventilator	Marathi	
2016	Force 2	Hindi	
2016	Shivaay	Hindi	National Film Award for Best Special Effects
2016	Dangal	Hindi	
2017	Baahubali: The Conclusion	Telugu; Tamil	
2017	Jagga Jasoos	Hindi	
2017	Baadshaho	Hindi	
2017	Mersal	Tamil	
2017	Golmaal Again	Hindi	
2017	Secret Superstar	Hindi	
2018	Thaanaa Serndha Koottam	Tamil	
2018	Padmaavat	Hindi	
2018	Raid	Hindi	
2018	Bharat Ane Nenu	Telugu	
2018	Sanju	Hindi	
2018	Odiyan	Malayalam	
2018	Ani... Dr Kashinath Ghanekar	Marathi	
2018	Mauli	Marathi	
2018	Simmba	Hindi	
2018	Zero	Hindi	
2019	Total Dhamaal	Hindi	
2019	Milan Talkies	Hindi	
2019	Maharshi	Telugu	
2019	Saaho	Telugu; Hindi	
2019	Kalank	Hindi	
2019	Junglee	Hindi	
2019	Malaal	Hindi	
2019	Bigil	Tamil	
2019	Jallikattu	Malayalam	
2020	Tanhaji	Hindi	Filmfare Award for Best Special Effects
2020	Malang	Hindi	
2020	Ludo	Hindi	
2020	Durgamati	Hindi	
2021	Tribhanga	Hindi	
2021	The Big Bull	Hindi	
2021	Radhe	Hindi	
2021	The Last Hour	Hindi	Web-Series
2021	Bhuj: The Pride of India	Hindi	
2021	Sooryavanshi	Hindi	
2021	Sardar Udham	Hindi	Filmfare Award for Best Special Effects
2021	Vakeel Saab	Telugu	
2021	Pushpa: The Rise	Telugu	
2022	Gangubai Kathiawadi	Hindi	
2022	Radhe Shyam	Telugu; Hindi	
2022	RRR	Telugu	
2022	Runway 34	Hindi	
2022	Sarkaru Vaari Paata	Telugu	
2022	Ponniyin Selvan: I	Tamil	
2022	Laal Singh Chaddha	Hindi	
2022	Godfather	Telugu	
2022	Thank God	Hindi	
2023	Waltair Veerayya	Telugu	
2023	Varisu	Tamil	
2023	Bholaa	Hindi	
2023	Ravanasura	Telugu	
2023	Agent	Telugu	
2023	Ponniyin Selvan: II	Tamil	
2023	Bhola Shankar	Telugu	
2023	Tiger Nageswara Rao	Telugu	
2023	Salaar: Part 1 – Ceasefire	Telugu	
2023	Animal	Hindi	
2024	Guntur Kaaram	Telugu	
2024	Maidaan	Hindi	
2024	Shaitaan	Hindi	
2024	Indian 2	Tamil	
2024	Sarfira	Hindi	
2024	Devara: Part 1	Telugu	
2024	Singham Again	Hindi	
2024	Pushpa 2: The Rule	Telugu	
2024	Baby John	Hindi	
2025	Daaku Maharaaj	Telugu	
2025	Azaad	Hindi	
2025	Raid 2	Hindi	
2025	Good Bad Ugly	Tamil	
2025	Thug Life	Tamil	
2025	Housefull 5	Hindi	
2025	Maa	Hindi	
2025	Son of Sardaar 2	Hindi	
2025	Baaghi 4	Hindi	
2025	Junior	Telugu; Kannada	
2025	They Call Him OG	Telugu	
2025	Kantara: Chapter 1	Kannada	
2025	Baahubali: The Epic	Telugu	
2025	De De Pyaar De 2	Hindi	
2026	The RajaSaab	Telugu	
2026	Parasakthi	Tamil	
2026	Ustaad Bhagat Singh	Telugu	
2026	Peddi	Telugu	
2026	Dhamaal 4	Hindi	
2026	Toxic	Kannada; English	
2026	Jana Nayagan	Tamil	
2026	The Paradise	Telugu	
2026	Jailer 2	Tamil	
2027	Varanasi	Telugu	
2027	Raaka	Tamil	

== Television ==
Key
†	Denotes films that have not yet been released

Year	Title	Network	Notes
2002–2004	Devi	Sony Entertainment Television	Produced under Devgn Software and Entertainment
2018	Swami Ramdev - Ek Sangharsh	Discovery Jeet	
2020	Lalbazaar	ZEE5	Presenter
2022	The Great Indian Murder	Hotstar	
2023	The Trial	Disney+ Hotstar	
