= Sooryavanshi =

2021 Indian Hindi film by Rohit Shetty

- Theatrical release poster
- Directed by: Rohit Shetty
- Screenplay by: Yunus Sajawal
- Dialogues by: Rohit Shetty; Farhad Samji; Sanchit Bedre; Vidhi Ghodgaonkar
- Story by: Rohit Shetty
- Produced by: Rohit Shetty; Karan Johar; Hiroo Yash Johar; Aruna Bhatia; Apoorva Mehta
- Starring: Akshay Kumar; Katrina Kaif; Jackie Shroff
- Cinematography: Jomon T. John
- Edited by: Bunty Nagi
- Music by: Songs: Tanishk Bagchi; Lijo George–DJ Chetas; JAM8; Original Songs: Pritam; Viju Shah; Pav Dharia; Score: Amar Mohile
- Production companies: Rohit Shetty Picturez; Reliance Entertainment; Dharma Productions; Cape of Good Films
- Distributed by: PVR Pictures
- Release date: 5 November 2021
- Running time: 145 minutes
- Country: India
- Language: Hindi
- Budget: ₹160 crore
- Box office: est. ₹294.91 crore

Sooryavanshi is a 2021 Indian Hindi-language action drama film written and directed by Rohit Shetty and produced by Reliance Entertainment, Rohit Shetty Picturez, Dharma Productions and Cape of Good Films. Based on an original story by Shetty, it is the fourth instalment of the Cop Universe. The film stars Akshay Kumar in the titular role and Katrina Kaif, with Jackie Shroff, Jaaved Jafferi, Abhimanyu Singh, Mrunal Jain, Nikitin Dheer, Gulshan Grover, Kumud Mishra and Vivan Bhatena in supporting roles. Ajay Devgn and Ranveer Singh reprise their roles as Singham and Simmba in cameo appearances. Set after the events of Simmba (2018), where Kumar's character was introduced in the post-credits scene, it follows a high-stakes anti-terrorism mission aided by Joint CP Kabir Shroff, who was instrumental in solving the 1993 Mumbai serial blasts case.

Sooryavanshi was initially scheduled to release on 24 March 2020, but was postponed due to the COVID-19 pandemic in India. After several delays, it finally released theatrically on 5 November 2021 coinciding with Diwali. The film received mixed reviews from critics but nonetheless emerged as a commercial success, becoming the highest grossing Hindi film of 2021.

== Plot ==
During the 1993 Mumbai blasts, Veer "Surya" Sooryavanshi loses his parents, where he becomes motivated to become an IPS officer. Years later, Bilal Ahmed, the mastermind of the blasts escapes from India, seeks refuge with dreaded terrorist Omar Hafeez at Pakistani Administrated Kashmir in Pakistan as they begin planning more such attacks. Omar's sons Riyaaz Hafeez and Raza Hafeez return from London, quitting their studies, after hearing news of their eldest brother, an officer in the Pakistani Army, being killed by Indian Soldiers in the Kargil Conflict; in response, they formed a sleeper cell network consisting of 40 terrorists, who pose as Indians, aiming to conduct more bombings after the 2008 Mumbai attacks. Surya, who is now a Deputy Commissioner of Police and ATS chief, plans an operation in Jaisalmer and manages to arrest Riyaaz, who was hiding his identity as restaurant owner Rajbir Rathod.

Surya's senior officer, Joint CP Kabir Shroff, who was the only person able to fully solve the case, reveals that a full ton of RDX was brought to India, of which 400 kg were used during the 1993 bombings and the remnant 600 kg are still buried somewhere in the country. Surya plans to catch the sleeper cell's remaining members, while also trying to reconcile with his estranged wife Dr. Riya Gupta, with whom he separated with when his son gets shot while catching a wanted criminal, but to no avail. Surya comes across Maulana Kader Usmani, who is in fact a terrorist and Bilal's accomplice. Usmani meets Bilal, who resides in Sawantwadi houses with the wanted 600 kg of RDX. They remove the buried RDX and prepare for the next bombings. Bilal reaches Mumbai using a fake identity with the help of taxi driver John Mascarenhas, who leaves for Bangkok.

Surya catches Bilal, who confesses that he undertook the bombings as revenge for his family being killed in 1993 Riots and shoots himself to death. Omar Hafiz after learning of Bilal's death now sends his younger son Raza giving a Sri Lankan Passport to exact revenge of Bilal's Death and also finish unfinished business. Later, John is apprehended in Bangkok after a long chase between him and Surya, who learns that the bombs were being made by another member of the sleeper cell. Usmani and John are arrested; Surya plans to pretend to torture Usmani's daughters to make him confess. Usmani finally reveals that Riyaaz will meet him at his aide Rafique's residence. A suicidal bomb planted there kills Usmani, whose elder daughter helps in identifying the bombmaker Vivek a.k.a. Mukhtar Ansari who also the son of Omar Hafiz right hand, who is hiding in Shivgad. Surya sends ACP Sangram "Simmba" Bhalerao to arrest him.

Simmba tells Surya that 7 bombs are to be planted at 7 locations in Mumbai. Riyaaz escapes with help of Raza and it is revealed that the ATS's headquarters would also be bombed. Surya and his team enlist NSG's and Indian Air Force Choppers help to safely extradite the bombs via helicopters and the bombings get botched. However, Riyaaz and his team use Riya as a suicide bomber to attack the ATS headquarters keeping Surya, Simmba and the other cops as hostages. Surya's friend DCP Bajirao Singham arrives and they defuse the bomb wrapped around Ria, while killing all the terrorists. They capture Mukhtar, Riyaaz and his younger brother Raza, with Singham warning Omar that he will take him out. Upon being cornered for arrest, the brothers taunt Singham, Simmba and Surya that they have been in India as sleeper cells for many years, carrying out several attacks in Mumbai, and that the police cannot harm them. Enraged, Singham, Simmba and Surya shoot them to death, thus bringing peace to Mumbai.

== Cast ==
- Akshay Kumar as DCP Veer Sooryavanshi, Chief of the ATS
- Katrina Kaif as Dr. Ria Sooryavanshi
- Jackie Shroff as Omar Hafeez, Chief of Lakshar-e-Taiba
- Jaaved Jaaferi as Joint CP Kabir Shroff
- Abhimanyu Singh as Riyaz Hafeez / Rajbir Rathod
- Mrunal Jain as Raza Hafeez, Riyaz's brother
- Nikitin Dheer as Mukhtar Ansari / Vivek Shastri
- Gulshan Grover as Mawlānā Kader Usmani
- Kumud Mishra as Bilal Ahmed / Ajay Gupta
- Vivan Bhatena as Senior Inspector Vivaan Singh
- Niharica Raizada as Senior Inspector Tara Manchandai
- Sikander Kher as John Mascarenhas, a taxi driver in Goa
- Shruti Panwar as Nafeesa Hafeez, Omar's wife
- Amritpal Singh as Inspector Abbas Naeem Khan
- Rajendra Gupta as Naeem Khan, Abbas' father
- Ashish Warang as Constable Ashish Tambe
- Umakant Patil as SI Umakant Bhide
- Haelyn Shastri as Senior Inspector Malvika Gupta
- Ajit Shidhaye as Murad Ahmed
- Uday Tikekar as the Chief Minister of Maharashtra
- Asif Basra as Rafique Siddique
- Anil Charanjeett as Aatmaran, Bilal's neighbour in Sawantwadi
- Vidhaan Sharma as Aryan Sooryavanshi
- Meenal Sahu as Jyoti Gupta, Rajbir's wife
- Sukanya Dhada as Zahida Usmani, Kader's wife
- Raaj Gopal Iyer as Manish Rao
- Sofiya Khan as Lily Dias, John's girlfriend
- Kishore Mahabolle as Sooryavanshi, Veer's father
- Jayant Savarkar as Mauvli
- Shaji Choudhary as Basheer, Omar's bodyguard

Cameo appearances

- Ajay Devgn as DCP Bajirao Singham
- Ranveer Singh as Inspector Sangram Simmba Bhalerao
- Siddhartha Jadhav as Senior Inspector Santosh Tawde

== Production ==
=== Development ===
Sooryavanshi was announced in December 2018 through a post-credit scene in Simmba. The first look posters featuring Akshay Kumar were unveiled in March 2019. Unlike earlier entries in the series, Sooryavanshi was not based on any existing work, instead being an original story. The scripting of the film began in 2019.

=== Casting ===
Kumar was finalised as the main lead for Sooryavanshi and his character was announced during the end credits of Simmba, conceiving the idea for the "Cop Universe". Shetty stated, "In Simmba, Ajay Devgn made a special appearance in his Bajirao Singham avatar, while Ranveer Singh too played a cop. Now in Sooryavanshi, both Ranveer and Ajay will be making an appearance and it will not be surprising if they reprise their respective roles from Simmba and Singham". Jacqueline Fernandez was rumoured to be the female lead opposite Kumar in the film, however later in March 2019 it was confirmed that Katrina Kaif was finalised as the female lead.

=== Filming ===
Miscellaneous work of the film commenced in February 2019 in Mumbai, where the film's teaser was shot. Shetty began filming early in the morning and were done in a couple of hours before leaving for Goa to complete the scripting stages. Principal photography commenced in Mumbai on 6 May 2019 and was planned to be shot in Mumbai, Goa, Hyderabad and Thailand. In June 2019, the recreated version of 'Tip Tip Barsa Paani' was shot in Mumbai, where choreographer Farah Khan had choreographed the song. Another schedule was shot in Hyderabad, where it was a month long schedule and majority of action sequences were filmed. The second schedule took place in Bangkok. The shooting wrapped up on 30 November 2019 in Hyderabad. The film's last schedule wrapped in December 2019 in Mumbai.

== Music ==
The music of the film is composed by Tanishk Bagchi, Lijo George – DJ Chetas and JAM8 with lyrics written by Rashmi Virag, Shabbir Ahmed, Anand Bakshi, Tanishk Bagchi and Prem Dhawan. The album was released through T-Series on 7 November 2021.

== Release ==
=== Theatrical ===
Initially announced as an Eid 2020 release, the film was rescheduled to 27 March 2020. Later, in February 2020, the makers decided to release it on 24 March 2020. However, the COVID-19 pandemic in India caused it to be postponed. In June 2020, Reliance Entertainment confirmed that Sooryavanshi will finally hit cinemas on Diwali, that is 13 November 2020, but due to theatre guidelines owing to the continuity of pandemic, the film was again put on hold as stated by the makers. In October 2020, the release was postponed to a later date, possibly between January and March 2021. In February 2021, sources confirmed that makers of Sooryavanshi have fixed 2 April 2021 as its new release date but that again failed to get materialised, because of night curfew or partial lockdown impose in Maharashtra announced by its government. After a delay of more than one year, it was declared on 14 March 2021 that the film will finally release theatrically on 30 April 2021. As of April 2021, the release date of film had been postponed indefinitely due to rise in COVID-19 cases and lockdown in Maharashtra. On 15 October 2021, it was announced that it will be released theatrically on 5 November 2021, coinciding with Diwali.

=== Home media ===
The film's digital rights were purchased by Netflix for ₹100 crore (US$10 million), and was premiered on 3 December 2021.

== Reception ==
=== Critical response ===
On the review aggregator website Rotten Tomatoes, 36% of 11 critics' reviews are positive, with an average rating of 5/10.

Archika Khurana from The Times of India gave 3 stars out of 5 and wrote, "Rohit Shetty has tactfully expanded his Cop Universe over the years – keeping the audience engaged and die-hard fans of the genre on the edge. After the Singham series (headlined by Ajay Devgn) and then Simbaa (starring Ranveer Singh), now storms in, Sooryavanshi (Akshay Kumar), amidst much fanfare, drama, and blaring theatrics. Sooryavanshi's character was subtly announced towards the end of Simmba. The film has all the elements, attitude, style, showmanship and heavy-duty star power expected of a Rohit Shetty offering."

Anuj Kumar from The Hindu equated the film with a pandemic. He opined that the film "planted seeds of suspicion against a particular community". However, he praised the action sequences and performances of the cast. He summed up the film as, "Deepawali cracker that lights up the sky but covers the soul with soot." Taran Adarsh of Bollywood Hungama gave 4.5 stars out of 5 on Twitter and called "Fantastic" made for mass action entertainment. Writing on the website Bollywood Hungama, he further stated that: "SOORYAVANSHI has it all: stars, scale, action and entertainment. Rohit Shetty presents a Blockbuster package this Diwali."

Shubhra Gupta from The Indian Express gave 2 stars and called, "It is only when the trio of Akshay Kumar, Ranveer Singh and Ajay Devgn come together, the Rohit Shetty movie gives us what it promises, three for the price of one."

Nandini Ramnath of Scroll.in gave 2 out of 5 stars and said, "The gist of the 145-minute movie is contained in the extended climactic action sequence." Monika Rawal Kukreja of Hindustan Times said, "Sooryavanshi isn't driven by a great script neither does it have any extraordinary suspense that could bring nail-biting moments. Yet, it keeps you on the edge for the sheer joy of watching that over-the-top action." Saibal Chatterjee of NDTV gave the film 2.5 stars rating and wrote, "Akshay's gait is stunt in itself: a cross between a model in the middle of catwalk and a superhero about to take flight. Just like Simmba had provided a glimpse of what was to come in the next instalment, Sooryavanshi indicates what the future might hold for the Rohit Shetty cop universe."

Himesh Mankad of Pinkvilla gave the film a rating of 3 stars out of 5 and wrote, "Sooryavanshi has its share of flaws, but also has enough going in its favor to entertain the audience on the big screen. It's a vehicle driven by Akshay Kumar, who gets support from Ajay Devgn and Ranveer Singh in the finale, resulting in a Diwali Dhamaka. It's unlike any Rohit Shetty film to date, rather, among his aesthetically sound directorial, which just deserved a little better writing and editing." Pradeep Menon from Firstpost gave the film 3 out of 5 stars rating and wrote, "Sooryavanshi doubles and triples down on its Hindu-Muslim unity message every instance it gets. It is not always done with nuance or understanding of complex religious dynamics, but the intentions are clear. This is a filmmaker reacting to the times he is living in. Keeping all of that aside, Sooryavanshi is a competent action film that sticks to lane, and delivers at least as much over-the-top entertainment as it promises."

Joginder Tuteja from Rediff.com gave the film 4.5 stars out of 5 and stated, "Sooryavanshi isn't the kind of masala entertainment that many film-makers have tried to force feed the audience. It is pure big screen entertainment, something that truly works right through its near two and a half hour duration. It's remarkable to notice how there is no dull moment in this two-and-a-half hour film, showing yet again that a long movie can work if made with conviction and loads of exciting sequences, just like Manmohan Desai used to do in his films with one highlight every 10 minutes." Deccan Herald gave a rating of 2.5/5 and said, "The best part of Sooryavanshi is when Simmba Bhalerao (Ranveer Singh) and Bajirao Singham (Ajay Devgn) join Veer Sooryavanshi (Akshay Kumar) in a high-octane clash against terrorists. The final 15-20 minutes is fun as the trio revels in slick action and whacky comedy."

Among international critics, Devika Girish of The New York Times criticised the film for uncritical jingoism and said "'Sooryavanshi' is weighed down by such endless, didactic soapboxing, while the rest of this erratic film devotes itself to juvenile jokes [...] and sultry songs that offer the film's female lead, Katrina Kaif, her only meaningful screen time."

According to Indian publication The Quint, Sooryavanshi "criminalises normal Muslim behaviour" and associates "things that a large number of Indian Muslims feel, say or do in their daily life" with terrorists. Washington Post columnist Rana Ayyub said that the movie stoked "Islamophobic tropes".

=== Box office ===
Sooryavanshi earned ₹26.29 crore (US$2.7 million) at the domestic box office on its opening day. On the second day, the film collected ₹23.85 crore (US$2.5 million). On the third day, the film collected ₹26.94 crore (US$2.8 million), taking total weekend domestic collection to ₹77.08 crore (US$8.0 million).

As of 20 December 2021, the film grossed ₹233.33 crore (US$24 million) in India and ₹61.58 crore (US$6.4 million) overseas, for a worldwide gross collection of ₹294.91 crore (US$31 million). It emerged as the highest-grossing Hindi film of the year.

== Impact ==
Sooryavanshi was the first major release post COVID-19 pandemic era, which revived the exhibition sector for Hindi cinema. Earlier, few films including Akshay Kumar's other film Bell Bottom got limited release, though it did almost ₹30 crore, but unable to revive. Sooryavanshi proved to be the ice breaker for the box office business in Bollywood.

== Future ==
Akshay Kumar and Jackie Shroff reprised their role as Sooryavanshi and Omar Hafeez in Singham Again. This crossover continues Rohit Shetty's interconnected Cop Universe, linking characters and storylines across his films.
