= Singham Again =

2024 Indian film by Rohit Shetty

- Theatrical release poster
- Directed by: Rohit Shetty
- Screenplay by: Yunus Sajawal; Abhijeet Khuman; Kshitij Patwardhan; Sandeep Saket; Anusha Nandakumar; Rohit Shetty
- Dialogues: Shantanu Srivastava; Milap Zaveri; Rohit Shetty
- Story by: Kshitij Patwardhan
- Produced by: Rohit Shetty; Ajay Devgn; Jyoti Deshpande
- Starring: Ajay Devgn; Akshay Kumar; Ranveer Singh; Tiger Shroff; Deepika Padukone; Kareena Kapoor Khan; Arjun Kapoor; Jackie Shroff
- Cinematography: Girish Kant; Raza Hussain Mehta
- Edited by: Bunty Nagi
- Music by: Ravi Basrur
- Production companies: Rohit Shetty Picturez; Jio Studios; Devgn Films; Reliance Entertainment
- Distributed by: PVR Inox Pictures
- Release date: 1 November 2024
- Running time: 144 minutes
- Country: India
- Language: Hindi
- Budget: ₹350–375 crore
- Box office: est. ₹389.64 crore

Singham Again is a 2024 Indian Hindi-language action film written, directed, and co-produced by Rohit Shetty. The film stars co-producer Ajay Devgn in the title role, alongside Akshay Kumar, Ranveer Singh, Deepika Padukone, Tiger Shroff, Kareena Kapoor Khan, Arjun Kapoor (in his penultimate film role before hiatus from acting) and Jackie Shroff, while Salman Khan makes a cameo appearance. A sequel to Singham (2011) and Singham Returns (2014), it is the fifth installment of Shetty's Cop Universe franchise.

The film was announced in September 2017 under the working title Singham 3, and the official title was announced in December 2022. Principal photography began in September 2023, and wrapped in September 2024. The film was shot in Mumbai, Hyderabad, Kashmir and Sri Lanka. Ravi Basrur composed the film's soundtrack and background score, replacing Shetty's franchise collaborator Amar Mohile for the original score, with Thaman S. serving as a guest composer. The lyrics were penned by Swanand Kirkire, who also returned to the franchise after Singham, with Kumaar as guest lyricist. Made on a budget of ₹350-375 crore, the film is one of the most expensive Indian films made.

Singham Again was released on 1 November 2024, coinciding with Diwali, in standard and IMAX formats. The film received mixed reviews from critics, and grossed over ₹389.64 crore. (Note: Singham Again's reported worldwide grosses vary between ₹367 - ₹389 crore as an average venture.(Pinkvilla) – ₹389.64 crore (Bollywood Hungama))

== Plot ==
Bajirao Singham is now married to Avni Kamat, who works in the Cultural Ministry, and has a son, Shaurya. He is now a DCP transferred from Mumbai to Srinagar for three years. Once there, he is attacked by the Chief of Lashkar, Omar Hafeez, who had fled from Pakistan to Sri Lanka and started selling drugs after his late sons, Riyaaz and Raza's plans were thwarted. (Note: As shown in Sooryavanshi (2021)) Singham successfully arrests him, but Omar arrogantly threatens him about the danger coming towards him, Sangram "Simmba" Bhalerao, and Veer Sooryavanshi for killing his sons. Singham meets Home Minister Raj Jaishankar and tells him about the drug syndicate operating in India and how they are being transported from Sri Lanka to the coastal areas of Tamil Nadu. Using the profits from the drug trade, Omar wants to initiate another terrorist attack on India. Jaishankar commissions a new squad, Shiva Squad, led by Singham and his fellow officers, inspector Daya and ACP Devika, to stop and destroy Lashkar.

Two years later, Avni is hosting a theatre production of Ramlila, depicting the journey of Lord Ram and Sita. Singham catches a ship sailing towards Tamil Nadu from Sri Lanka and finds drugs in the containers and arrests four men working for a person named Danger Lanka. Upon interrogating them, the arrested men reveal that three of Lanka's associates were residing in Madurai. Singham calls upon DCP Shakti Shetty from Madurai to arrest and escort all three of them to Mumbai, which she does promptly. However, on the same night, Danger Lanka arrives at the police station, kills all the policemen, and rescues his three men. Shakti feels guilty for not being able to save the police officers, but Singham consoles her and tells her to track them down.

Meanwhile, Avni departs for Rameshwaram to shoot some footage for the production along with her colleague, Mrigya. Singham sends Daya along with them. Upon collecting footage for the production, Avni is about to go back to Mumbai when she is abducted by Danger Lanka. He reveals that it was a plan made by him and Mrigya. On hearing of Avni's abduction, Singham and his team leave for Rameshwaram. Meanwhile, Daya tails and finds Avni, rescues and helps her to run away. However, she is chased by Lanka's men, and in the ensuing chase, throws her bangles, which were gifted by Singham, as a mark for him to trace. While trying to save Avni, Daya gets brutally injured by Lanka. Avni is then rescued by ACP Satya Bali, who considers Singham his inspiration and takes her to his home. Singham reaches there and meets Daya, who is in a critical state, and airlifts him. He finds Avni's bangles and finds out that she is with Satya.

Danger Lanka reaches and attacks Satya's home, and in the midst, Avni is shot and abducted by Danger Lanka. Singham arrives there, meets Satya, and saves his family. Danger goes back to Sri Lanka and reveals to Singham, his true identity as Zubair Hafeez, Omar's grandson, who wants to take revenge on Singham, Simmba, and Sooryavanshi; Mrigya reveals her identity as Iqra Hafeez, Zubair's aunt whose husband, Raza, was also killed by the three of them. They reveal that they both stayed in India for two years to keep an eye on Singham and Avni. Zubair instructs Singham to bring Omar along with Simmba and Sooryavanshi, and to take Avni back with him. Singham vows to him and Omar Hafeez to save Avni.

Zubair reaches Colombo and keeps Avni hostage. He tells Singham to send Simmba to Sri Lanka to check on Avni. Singham goes to Shivgarh and meets Simmba. He agrees to go to Sri Lanka and meets Avni, telling her that Singham is coming to rescue her. Just as Zubair tries to trap Simmba, he escapes from Zubair's clutches by destroying his hideout. Meanwhile, Singham secretly reaches Sri Lanka and, with the help of a few RAW agents, finds Simmba and Avni. Jaishankar sends Omar Hafeez to Colombo on a military plane. Shakti and Satya arrive at the port the next day and help Simmba and Singham rescue Avni, with Sooryavanshi joining them in their fight with his helicopter at the end moment. Together, they rescue Avni and kill Zubair's army. Singham kills Zubair and goes back to India along with Avni and his team, while the military plane carrying Omar Hafeez returns to India with him. Avni is finally able to wrap up her production of the Ramlila show as it becomes a huge success.

In the post-credits scene, ACP Chulbul Pandey visits Singham's cabin and asks to join his Shiva Squad.

== Cast ==
- Ajay Devgn as DCP Bajirao Singham
- Akshay Kumar as DCP Veer "Surya" Sooryavanshi
- Ranveer Singh as ACP Sangram "Simmba" Bhalerao
- Tiger Shroff as ACP Satya Bali
- Deepika Padukone as DCP Shakti Shetty (Lady Singham)
- Kareena Kapoor Khan as Avni Kamat Singham
- Arjun Kapoor as Zubair Hafeez / Danger Lanka
- Jackie Shroff as Omar Hafeez
- Ravi Kishan as Home Minister Raj Jaishankar
- Shweta Tiwari as ACP Devika Singh
- Dayanand Shetty as Inspector Daya Shetty
- Viren Vazirani as Shaurya Singham
- Ranbir Vijan as Melvin
- Anushka Merchande as Trisha
- Rajshree Nair as Nilima Bali
- Prerna Gandhi as Revti Amma
- Raunak Kumar Rawat as Sahil
- Hemant Rathi as B. Subramani "Subbu"
- Bhagya Nair as Sneha Subramani
- Sara Arfeen Khan as Iqra Hafeez / Mrigya
- Vatsan Chakravarthy as Krishnan
- Ankit Mohan as Sarath
- Saurav Lokesh as Raju
- Chetan Chitnis as Ranga
- R. Siddarth as Birju
- Sharad Shetty as Inspector Kumar
- Raju Kamle as Police Constable
- Abhishek Jaigovind as Sri Lankan Doctor
- John Lucas as John Lucas
- Abhi Munde as Sutradhaar
- Sneha Shetty Kohli as Swara
- Hrishik Phukan as Ram
- Vansh Pannu as Lakshman
- Varinder Singh as Hanuman
- Hardeep Singh as Ravana
- Saloni Misra as Sita
- Rajesh Dubey as Dashrath
- Priya Nimishakavi as Kaikai
- Digamber Kalekar as Kumbhakarna
- John Monu as Meghnad
- Aryan Hasan as Vanara
- Farrhana Bhatt as Reporter

Cameo appearances

- Salman Khan as ACP Chulbul Pandey

Archival footage

- Abhimanyu Singh as Riyaaz Hafeez / Rajbir Rathod

== Production ==
=== Development ===
In September 2017, Rohit Shetty, while announcing his next directorial venture with Ranveer Singh, revealed that a third installment of the Singham film franchise would be made. Written and directed by him, he revealed that it would feature Ajay Devgn but did not reveal when production would begin. In January 2020, Devgn hinted that works for the third installment of the franchise, tentatively titled as Singham 3, was in progress. In March that year, Akshay Kumar, who previously acted in Shetty's Sooryavanshi (2021) which is a part of Cop Universe along with the Singham franchise, was reported to reprise his role from the film. Later in January 2021, production for the film was reported to begin after Shetty finishes works for Cirkus in 2022, and Jackie Shroff was reported to play the main antagonist. Along with Akshay Kumar, Ranveer Singh was also reported in November to reprise his role from the 2018 film Simmba. On 1 December 2022, the collaboration of Shetty and Devgn was announced by the production houses, and the official title Singham Again was announced. Production was set to commence after Devgn finished Bholaa (2023).

=== Casting ===
While Ajay Devgn, Kareena Kapoor Khan, Akshay Kumar, Ranveer Singh, Jackie Shroff, Dayanand Shetty and other remaining actors have reprised their respective roles from previous films of Cop Universe, Deepika Padukone, Tiger Shroff and Shweta Tiwari were added to the cast. Later, Arjun Kapoor was roped in February 2024. The character of Arjun Kapoor was reported to be a Sri Lankan militant. In September 2024, rumours had spread that Salman Khan would have a cameo appearance in the film as Chulbul Pandey, later it was considered that Khan would not have a cameo. However, a few days later Khan's cameo was confirmed.

=== Filming ===
Principal photography commenced on 16 September 2023 with a muhuratam puja held at Yash Raj Studios in Mumbai. The first schedule was held at the same location. Ranveer Singh was also part of this schedule. Shweta Tiwari also joined the sets. Kareena Kapoor joined the sets on 23 September.

The second schedule commenced on 5 October in Hyderabad where major portion of the film including high action packed climax was shot with all the cast members. Kareena Kapoor joined the sets on 6 October. Ajay Devgn, Akshay Kumar, Ranveer Singh, Tiger Shroff, and Arjun Kapoor too joined the sets. Akshay Kumar wrapped his portion on 15 October. Ranveer Singh wrapped his portion on 20 October. The second schedule wrapped on 7 November.

Filming resumed on 19 November at Madh Island to shoot an action scene that plays out at a fair. Over 100 actors were roped in as the scene required a huge crowd. In the last week of November, An elaborate action scene was shot with Devgn and Singh at the Golden Tobacco Factory in Vile Parle. It also featured a crowd of 150-200 people, and some car explosions. Devgn was also injured in his eye while shooting this scene. Filming then moved to Film City where a fight scene was shot set in the backdrop of an Ashram. Kareena Kapoor, Tiger Shroff, and Arjun Kapoor also shot a scene at night.

In the second week of January, filming started again at Ramoji Film City, where a majority of action sequences were shot, albeit without Devgn as he was still recuperating. Later, Arjun Dwivedi joined the cast, reprising his role from the Cop Universe series Indian Police Force.

In February 2024, Tiger Shroff's wrapped his scenes at Film City. In the first week of March, a fight sequence was shot at Byculla with Ajay Devgn, Dayanand Shetty, and Shweta Tiwari. Filming then moved to Richardson & Cruddas Mill. In the third week of March, filming took place at a temple in Wai with Kareena Kapoor Khan, and Arjun Kapoor.

In 3rd week of April 2024, Akshay Kumar shot his remaining portions at Ramoji Film City. Deepika Padukone shot her scenes at Golden Tobacco Factory, Vile Parle. Arjun Kapoor wrapped up his portion in May 2024 with a heartfelt note. The action face off between Ajay Devgn and Jackie Shroff, was shot in Kashmir in May 2024. Ranveer Singh shot his remaining portions by the end of the month. In July 2024, Ajay Devgn wrapped up his portions. In September 2024, the climax of the film along with some additional scenes were shot in Vile Parle.

== Music ==
Singham Again

Soundtrack album by Ravi Basrur
- Released: 5 November 2024
- Recorded: 2023–2024
- Genre: Feature film soundtrack
- Length: 14:47
- Language: Hindi
- Label: Saregama

Official audio
- Singham Again (Full Album) on YouTube

Distributed and released by Saregama in its first collaboration with Shetty, the soundtrack for Singham Again is composed by Ravi Basrur, who took over duties from franchise composer Amar Mohile for the background score, while lyrics for the songs were written by Swanand Kirkire, who returned to the franchise after the 2011 original, and Kumaar as a guest lyricist for one song. Thaman S. serves as a guest composer having composed the first single titled "Jai Bajrangbali" which was released on 19 October 2024. The second single titled "Singham Again Title Track" was released on 26 October 2024. However, it was taken down due to a YouTube copyright strike by T-Series since they released the Singham theme from the previous two films. Later, an edited version of the song was released without the copyrighted portions.

Track listing
No.	Title	Lyrics	Music	Singer(s)	Length
1.	"Jai Bajrangbali"	Swanand Kirkire	Thaman S	Sri Krishna, Kareemullah, Arun Koundinya, Chaitu Satsangi, Sri Sai Charan, Sudhanshu, Ritesh G Rao, Saatvik G Rao, Prudhvi Chandra, Lakshmi Naidu, Adviteeya, Sruthi Ranjani, Pranati, Aishwarya Daruri, Sahithi Chaganti, Maneesha Pandranki, Shruthika, Lakshmi Meghana, Nadapriya, Vagdevi	4:01
2.	"Singham Again – Title Track"	Swanand Kirkire	Ravi Basrur	Santhosh Venky	3:40
3.	"Lady Singham"	Kumaar	Ravi Basrur	Santhosh Venky	3:19
4.	"Raavan Intro"	Abhi Munde	Ravi Basrur	Vijay Basrur, Krishna Basrur, Nagaprakash Kota, Chethan Handattu, Krishnamurthy Basrur, Ramakrishna Basrur, Poornana Basrur, Jagadish Venky, Bhaskaruni Sai Charan	2:12
5.	"Laxman Theme"	Ravi Basrur	Ravi Basrur	Vijay Basrur, Krishna Basrur, Nagaprakash Kota, Chethan Handattu, Krishnamurthy Basrur, Ramakrishna Basrur, Poornana Basrur, Jagadish Venky, Shivukumar Jayaram	1:35
Total length:					14:47

== Release ==
=== Theatrical ===
Singham Again was released worldwide on 1 November 2024, coinciding with Diwali in standard and IMAX formats. The film was originally scheduled to release on 15 August 2024, coinciding Independence Day, but was postponed due to unfinished post-production work. The international distribution rights were acquired by Phars Films. The film was granted a U/A (parental guidance) classification by the Central Board of Film Certification after 7.12 minutes were edited.

The film was banned in Saudi Arabia due to its portrayal of a "religious conflict" and Hindu-Muslim tensions. Its release clashed with the film Bhool Bhulaiyaa 3.

=== Home media ===
The digital streaming rights of the film were acquired by Amazon Prime Video for ₹130 crore. The film began streaming on the platform from 27 December 2024.

== Reception ==
=== Box-office ===
Singham Again made ₹43.70 crore on opening day and a total of ₹125 crore on its opening weekend. As of 28 November 2024, the film has grossed ₹316.45 crore in India and ₹73.19 crore internationally, bringing its total worldwide gross to ₹367−389.64 crore.

=== Critical reception ===
Singham Again received mixed reviews from critics, with praise for the performances, but criticism for the screenplay. On the review aggregator website Rotten Tomatoes, 33% of 18 critics' reviews are positive, with an average rating of 5.3/10.

Ganesh Aaglave of Firstpost rated 3.5/5 stars and notes "The blockbuster combo of Rohit Shetty and Ajay Devgn has again hit the bullseye and delivered a perfect Diwali entertainer." Shubhra Gupta of The Indian Express rated 1.5/5 stars and opined "It’s all so same-old in Ajay Devgn-Rohit Shetty's Singham Again that even the new locations don’t help. Neither does all the blatant-referencing-and-copy-pasting of Ramayan." Eshita Bhargava of The Financial Express gave a rating of 1/5 and writes "By the interval, “Singham Again” had lost its way, becoming an unconvincing collage of misplaced patriotism, forced mythology, and absurd action. It had potential, but it's lost under too many weak layers."

Rishabh Ganguly of Times Now rated 3.5/5 stars and highlights that "Do not expect to get a strong storyline, tear-jerking performance or unexpected twists from Singham Again. Logic and Rohit Shetty entertainers do not align and if you are a fan of the latter, this movie will live up to your expectations." Sana Farzeen of India Today rated 3.5/5 stars and writes "Rohit Shetty reimagines the Ramayan in his cop universe with Ajay Devgn as Bajirao Singham, offering a blend of humour, drama, and action." Dhaval Roy of The Times of India rated 3.5 /5 stars and wrote "The movie is unabashedly entertaining, cheesy, and wild, with moments that will have you laughing out loud. Singham Again unleashes a high- octane blend of action and entertainment. Despite some flaws, this actioner roars." Deepa Gahlot of Rediff.com rated 2.5/5 stars and notes "Singham Again is action heavy, so its appeal is limited to fans of the genre." Bollywood Hungama rated the film 4.5 stars out of 5 and wrote, "On the whole, Singham Again is a big Diwali dhamaka. While it suffers from a screenplay of convenience and a weak soundtrack, it compensates with mass-pleasing moments, the parallels with Ramayana and the coming together of major stars – a phenomenon seen in Bollywood after ages."

Shilajit Mitra, writing for The Hindu, calls the movie "ostensibly an action potboiler and an Avengers-like ‘team-up’ movie but playing like an ad for the tourism ministry's Ramayana trail." Prathamesh Jadhav of The Free Press Journal rated 3/5 stars and wrote "In a nutshell, Singham Again is explosive and entertaining even if the tale continues to be predictable. The film scores high in terms of the scale, the drama and the impact!" Eba Fatima Azeem of News 24 rated 3/5 stars and opined "Singham Again is a swaggering, action-packed film with a Ramayana-inspired theme and is ideal for fans. Even with its predictable story, it delivers exactly what you’d expect." Jaya Dwivedie of India TV News rated 3/5 stars and wrote "Singham Again is a power packed film which you can definitely watch once. The story of the film will entertain you, some scenes are definitely irritating, like Ajay Devgn shooting with his fingers, but overall this film is worth watching and deserves 3 stars."

Rishabh Suri of Hindustan Times writes, "Singham Again has a strong second half with engaging performances, especially by Ranveer Singh, but suffers from a chaotic first half." Komal Nahta of Film Information wrote, "On the whole, Singham Again is a super-hit and will do extraordinary business. It will work in the multiplexes as well as single-screen cinemas and will appeal to men and women, girls and boys, young and old, rich and poor." Scroll.in wrote, "If it were not for Ranveer Singh, Singham Again would be borderline boring." DNA India wrote "Ajay Devgn is in his element but in a better way. Despite this being an established franchise, Singham Again doesn't try to go beyond the set pattern, which tremendously works in the film's favour."

Davesh Sharma of Filmfare.com rated 2.5/5 stars wrote, "All in all, watch Singham Again for its massive star presence and non-stop action. It’s strictly for action buffs and Rohit Shetty fans." Saibal Chatterjee of NDTV gave 2/5 stars and opined, "By far the brightest spark in the film is Ranveer Singh. With his constant chatter, he is indeed funny for the most part."
