= Simmba =

2018 Indian film by Rohit Shetty

- Theatrical release poster
- Directed by: Rohit Shetty
- Screenplay by: Yunus Sajawal; Farhad Samji
- Dialogues by: Sajid Samji
- Story by: Vakkantham Vamsi
- Based on: Temper by Puri Jagannadh
- Produced by: Hiroo Yash Johar; Karan Johar; Rohit Shetty; Apoorva Mehta
- Starring: Ranveer Singh; Sonu Sood; Sara Ali Khan
- Narrated by: Ajay Devgn
- Cinematography: Jomon T. John
- Edited by: Bunty Nagi
- Music by: Songs: Tanishk Bagchi; Lijo George – DJ Chetas; S. Thaman; Score: Amar Mohile; S. Thaman; Chandan Saxena
- Production companies: Reliance Entertainment; Dharma Productions; Rohit Shetty Picturez
- Distributed by: Reliance Entertainment
- Release dates: 27 December 2018 (United Arab Emirates); 28 December 2018 (India)
- Running time: 158 minutes
- Country: India
- Language: Hindi
- Budget: ₹80 crore
- Box office: est. ₹400.19 crore

Simmba is a 2018 Indian Hindi-language action comedy film directed by Rohit Shetty and produced by Rohit Shetty Picturez, Reliance Entertainment and Dharma Productions. The third installment of Shetty's Cop Universe, it stars Ranveer Singh, Sonu Sood and Sara Ali Khan with Ajay Devgn reprising his role of Singham in a cameo role. A remake of the 2015 Telugu film Temper, the film follows Sangram "Simmba" Bhalerao, a corrupt police officer hailing from the same town as Singham, who is forced to lead a more righteous path after tragedy strikes those near him.

Principal photography began in June 2018 with most scenes filmed in Goa and Kolhapur; the remaining were shot in Hyderabad and Mehboob Studios in Mumbai. The shooting was wrapped up by early December in the same year. The film's soundtrack was composed by Tanishk Bagchi, Lijo George – DJ Chetas and S. Thaman, with lyrics written by Shabbir Ahmed, Rashmi Virag, Kumaar and Kunaal Verma. The soundtrack features remakes of two 1996 songs: "Aankh Marey" originally from the film Tere Mere Sapne, and the qawwali song "Tere Bin" by Nusrat Fateh Ali Khan.

Simmba was released in countries of the Gulf Cooperation Council on 27 December 2018. The film was released in India and other international territories on the following day; it was distributed worldwide by Reliance Entertainment. The film received mixed-to-positive reviews from critics but became Singh's highest-earning opening film as of 2018 and went on to gross about ₹400 crore worldwide. Later, it received the Australian Telstra People's Choice Award.

Simmba marks the final collaboration of writer Sajid Samji with both his brother Farhad, who is credited separately since their split after Golmaal Again and with Shetty, who later worked with Farhad on Sooryavanshi, the next installment in the Cop Universe, and finally Cirkus, a spinoff prequel to Golmaal Again, before switching over to an entirely fresh set of writers for his subsequent projects.

== Plot ==
Sangram "Simmba" Bhalerao is an antiheroic orphan from Shivgad, the same town where Bajirao Singham was raised, where he observes how policemen make money in the form of bribes, finds himself motivated to become a police officer, and succeeds. Getting bribes from some local thieves and a jeweller, Simmba enjoys and takes full advantage of the lifestyle of a corrupt cop.

Simmba is soon transferred to the Miramar police station in Goa by Home Minister Vinayak Dutta, where he sees Shagun Sathe and falls in love with her at first sight. He meets his fellow policemen and one of his juniors, Nityanand Mohile, who is an honest constable, hesitates to salute Simmba as he's a corrupt cop. To prove his worth in Miramar, he interrupts a pub party run by an influential gangster named Durva Yashwant Ranade and his brothers, Sadashiv "Sada" and Gaurav "Giri" and demands more money from them, whilst promising that he will let them continue with their illegal activities.

Durva agrees and uses Simmba to seize the land of an old person named Vaman Rao, who is forced to sign the papers by Simmba. Meanwhile, Simmba develops motherly and sisterly bonds with several women and girls, one of whom happens to be Aakruti Dave, a young woman who reminds Simmba of his teacher. Aakruti files a complaint against Sada and Giri for dealing illicit drugs in their pub and using children as peddlers. Simmba initially ignores this after being pacified by Durva, and Shagun.

Meanwhile, Aakruti learns about the drug racket in the club and goes there one night with Chhotu, a mute boy who is her student. She videotapes everything there with her cell phone and plans to show evidence to the police but is caught by Sada and Giri. Chhotu discreetly records Sada and Giri assaulting Aakruti and flees once both of them realize. Aakruti is then brutally raped by Sada and Giri. Chhotu tries to tell Aakruti's friend Kavya about Aakruti being in danger. Kavya whilst being chased by Durva's goons goes to Simmba to file Aakruti's missing complaint.

Aakruti is found, having been fatally injured and taken to the hospital. Simmba tries to talk to her, but she dies, leaving him devastated. The police recover Aakruti's phone and the video which she shot, and Durva sends his goons to get the phone from Simmba, who is present, mends his ways, and fights them all. Simmba finally wears his police uniform, and seeing this change in him, Mohile finally salutes him as they arrest Sada and Giri. He apologises to Vaman Rao and returns the land swindled from him.

In the court, Simmba is shocked to find Aakruti's video being deleted. He beats up Durva's friend, Corporator David Cameron, who gave a false statement in the court, leading to his suspension orders. He decides to kill Sada and Giri before he goes, and plans to show it as an encounter. He shoots them both and shows as if he killed them in the act of self-defence. An SIT committee is set up by the state, who question Simmba's encounter. Aiming to achieve clarity to the situation, Vinayak appoints a neutral officer to handle Aakruti's case, as well as Simmba's controversial encounter.

Enraged, Durva and his goons capture Simmba. Suddenly, DCP Bajirao Singham arrives to rescue him, and both of them beat up Durva and his men. Singham tells Simmba that he is the neutral officer appointed by the state committee to handle his case and gives a statement that Simmba killed Sadashiv and Gaurav in the act of self-defence. He also calls Durva's mother Bharti and wife Varsha, who each state that it was Sada and Giri who assaulted Aakruti and that the brothers ran a drug racket and several other illegal activities.

As a result of these crimes, Durva is sentenced to 7 years of rigorous imprisonment by the court. Singham reveals that he helped Simmba despite being against his corrupt actions so that he could instil a fear of law in the minds of men who do not respect women.

in a post-credits scene, he chats with DCP Veer Sooryavanshi on the phone. and also congratulates him on his new post as the ATS chief. Sooryavanshi tells him that he will meet him soon.

== Cast ==
- Ranveer Singh as Senior Inspector Sangram Bhalerao a.k.a. "Simmba"
  - Yash Rane as young Simmba
- Sonu Sood as Durva Yashwant Ranade
- Sara Ali Khan as Shagun Sathe, Simmba's girlfriend
- Ashutosh Rana as Head-Constable Nityanand Mohile, Nandini's father
- Siddhartha Jadhav as Inspector Santosh Tawde
- Vaidehi Parashurami as Aakruti Dave
- Ulka Gupta as Nandini Mohile, Nityanand's daughter
- Suchitra Bandekar as Mrs. Mohile, Nityanand's wife and Nandini's mother
- Abhishek Khandekar as IG Prakash Deshmukh
- Sulbha Arya as Iyer Mausi
- Ashwini Kalsekar as Justice Smita Parulkar
- Neha Mahajan as Kavya Salgaonkar, Aakruti's friend
- Nandu Madhav as Mr. Dave, Aakruti's father
- Shri Swara Dubey as Varsha Ranade, Durva's wife
- Sarita Joshi as Bharti Ranade, Durva's mother
- Saurabh Gokhale as Gaurav "Giri" Ranade, Durva's brother
- Amrit Pal Singh as Sadashiv "Sada" Ranade, Durva's brother
- Puja Agarwal as News Reporter
- Vijay Patkar as Havaldar Alok Borkar
- Ashok Samarth as Advocate Joshi, Durva's lawyer
- Ganesh Yadav as Advocate Sawalkar, Simmba's lawyer
- Arun Nalawade as Vaman Rao
- Uday Tikekar as Vinayak Dutta, Goa Minister of Home Affairs
- Vipin Sharma as Corporator David Cameron
- Sahil Joshi as Aniket Mohre a.k.a. "Chhotu", Aakruti's student
- Ravjeet Singh as Dheeraj, Shagun's friend
- Ronjini Chakraborty as Poornima, Shagun's friend
- Anil Mange as Purab
- Besant Ravi as Sub-Inspector Gaekwad
- Chitra Shukla as Gayatri, Simmba's childhood teacher
- Sneha James as Inspector Gauri Rai
- Aashish Warang as Constable Ashish Tambe
- Umakant Patil as Sub-Inspector Umakant Bhide

Cameo appearances

- Ajay Devgn as DCP Bajirao Singham
- Akshay Kumar as DCP Veer Sooryavanshi
- Arshad Warsi as himself in the song "Aankh Marey" (the song is from his film Tere Mere Sapne)
- Tusshar Kapoor as himself in the song "Aankh Marey"
- Kunal Khemu as himself in the song "Aankh Marey"
- Shreyas Talpade as himself in the song "Aankh Marey"
- Karan Johar as himself in the song "Aankh Marey"
- Sudha Chandran as herself

== Production ==
It is a remake of the Telugu-language film Temper (2015). Shetty said, "We wanted to take four-five scenes from Temper but... thought it's better to buy the rights". In March 2018, R. Madhavan opted out of his role as the film's antagaonist after suffering a shoulder injury, and was replaced by Sonu Sood. The film has an estimated production budget of ₹80 crore (US$11.7 million). Principal photography for Simmba began in June 2018. It was mainly filmed in Goa and Kolhapur, with some filming in Hyderabad and extra sequences filmed at Mehboob Studios in Mumbai.

On 29 June 2018, the crew filmed the song, "Simmba Aala Re Aala Simmba Aala", at Ramoji Film City in Hyderabad. On Instagram, Singh noted the large scale of the production and said that it was the biggest song of his career.

Legal issues surrounding the production of Khan's debut-film Kedarnath interfered with the production of Simmba. Khan was scheduled to shoot for both films around the same time. A lawsuit shut down the production of Kedarnath and Khan allotted the time to work on Simmba. Kedarnath's director, Abhishek Kapoor, sued Khan because his film would be delayed and it would no longer mark the debut of Khan. The two settled out of court when Khan agreed to split her time between both films.

In October 2018, lead actors Singh and Khan left for Switzerland to film a song sequence for the film. By late October, the crew had returned to Mumbai to film a second song, "Aankh Marey"—a remake of a 90s classic song.

Because Singh was to be married in November 2018, Shetty shot most of the major sequences before the wedding date. Only the final sequence was left to be filmed after the wedding. A double for Singh was used to complete patch work of a dhaba fight scene in Goa; various camera angles were used so that the double would resemble Singh.

The film wrapped shooting in early December 2018.

== Soundtrack ==
The songs are composed by Tanishk Bagchi, Lijo George – DJ Chetas and S. Thaman while the lyrics are written by Shabbir Ahmed, Rashmi Virag, Kumaar and Kunaal Vermaa. The soundtrack album was released on 27 December 2018.

== Marketing and release ==
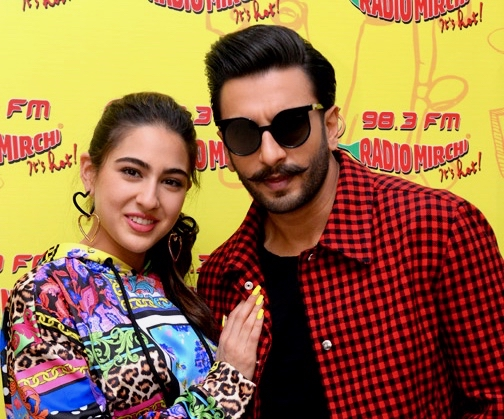
Ranveer Singh and Sara Ali Khan promoting the film in 2018

Simmba was released in countries of the Gulf Cooperation Council on 27 December 2018. It was released in India and other countries on 28 December. It was shown on 4020 screens in India and 963 screens overseas, for a worldwide screen total of 4983 screens.

On 6 June 2018, the producers announced the start of principal photography with a skit video featuring actors Singh and Khan, director Shetty, and producer Johar.

On 6 December 2018, the first song from the film was released, titled "Aankh Marey," a remake of the original song from the 1996 hit film Tere Mere Sapne. It is sung by Kumar Sanu (who also sung the original with Kavita Krishnamurthy), Mika Singh, and Neha Kakkar. Actor Arshad Warsi, whose film and song debut was with the original, appeared again in the video for the Simmba remake, along with several actors from another film from director Rohit Shetty, Golmaal: Kunal Khemu, Shreyas Talpade, and Tusshar Kapoor. The release date for the remake was specifically chosen to coincide with the release date of the original 22 years earlier (6 December 1996).

== Reception ==
=== Critical response ===
Ambica Schin of Khaleej Times gave the film four stars out of five and sums up, "If you are on the lookout for a totally masala, paisa vasool movie to end the year with a bang, we recommend you watch Simmba. The melodramatic, over-the-top film is sure to leave you on a high." Taran Adarsh of Bollywood Hungama declared it a "winner" with four stars out of five, writing, "Rohit borrows the essence from Temper, but modifies a major chunk of that film... What eventually unfolds on screen is so different, in a positive way." Anwesha Madhukalya of Business Today wrote, "It is indeed time to rejoice for the young star's fans for Simmba has announced the arrival of Ranveer Singh in the big league".

Writing for The Times of India, Ronak Kotecha rated it three and a half stars out of five, terming the film as "a potboiler that you expect it to be, where the good surely outweighs the bad." A critic for The Economic Times agreed, also rating it three and a half stars out of five, but felt that "[t]he film takes a preachy turn in the second half and the narrative gets predictable."

Writing for Hindustan Times, Raja Sen rated the film three stars out of five, writing, "[A]s it stands, Simmba is not only ahead of Singham, but far superior to Dabangg, the blockbuster that defines the genre." He appreciated Singh for the energy he brought to the role, but found Khan was restricted by her role. Rajeev Masand of News18 gave the film two and a half stars out of five, finding the first half to be "a sporadically enjoyable comedy", but found the second half to be "less enjoying": "The film leaves a lot to be desired, but a star is re-born." Uday Bhatia of Mint concurred with Masand: but credited Singh for playing his "cardboard creation" of a character with an "underlying sweetness that renders it more winsome than the humourless masculinity of Devgan's Singham." Shubhra Gupta of The Indian Express gave the movie two stars, and concluded, "The only reason to watch Simmba is Ranveer Singh. The actor is fully alive to the moment, knowing that he is working in a template, aware that he has to keep breaking out."

=== Box office ===
The box office collection figures for the opening weekend of the film as presented on Bollywood Hungama are: The first day It earned ₹20.72 crore nett in India, which made it Singh's highest-opening film as of 2018. On second day it collected ₹23.33 crore nett and ₹31.06 crore on third day. The total first weekend nett domestic collection was ₹75.11 crore. The opening week pan-India collection was ₹ 150.81 crore, which made it a hit film.

In its second week on the eighth day, domestic collection was ₹9.02 crore. On the ninth day, collection rose to ₹13.32 crore. Tenth day collection is ₹17.49 crore. Eleventh day collection is ₹6.16. Twelfth day collection is ₹6.03. Thirteen day collection is ₹5.31 and ending at 4.29 crore, taking second week collection to ₹61.62 crore. The domestic gross is ₹308.09 crore. It becomes Rohit Shetty's biggest hit as it beats lifetime business of Chennai Express.

The film grossed ₹92.10 crore (US$13.47 million) from overseas markets as estimated by Bollywood Hungama. The gross worldwide is ₹400.19 crore (US$58.52 million). It became third highest-grossing film of 2018. In Pakistan, the film has collected more than Rs. 19 crore till its fifth weekend.

== Animated series ==
Smashing Simmba, an animated television series based on Simmba was released on 14 November 2020 on Pogo TV.

=== Game ===
A skateboard running mobile video game based on Smashing Simmba, Smaashhing Simmba - Skate Rush, was released by Zapak in 2021.

== Future ==
Ranveer Singh made cameo appearances as Simmba in Sooryavanshi (2021) and Singham Again (2024)
