= Jayant Savarkar =

Indian Marathi film actor (1936–2023)

- Born: 3 May 1936; Guhagar, Bombay Province, British India
- Died: 24 July 2023 (aged 87)
- Occupation: Actor
- Notable work: Rocky Handsome (2016), Singham (2011), Vaastav: The Reality (1999), Samantar (2020)
- Spouse: Nirmala Savarkar

Jayant Savarkar (3 May 1936 – 24 July 2023) was an Indian actor who worked in Marathi and Hindi theatre, television, and films.

On 21 May 2023 he was awarded Jeevan Gaurav Award by the Ambarnath Marathi Film Festival (AMFF).

Savarkar was awarded the Natvarya Prabhakar Panshikar Lifetime Achievement Award by the Government of Maharashtra in the field of theatre.

Jayant Savarkar died on 24 July 2023 at the age of 87.

== Web series ==
Jayant Sawarkar is known for his role as an astrologer in the Marathi language web series Samantar which also features Swapnil Joshi in lead role. The series was released in 2020.
