= Indian Police Force (TV series) =

Indian television series by Rohit Shetty

- Official release poster
- Genre: Action-thriller; Police procedural
- Created by: Rohit Shetty
- Written by: Sandeep Saket; Anusha Nandakumar
- Directed by: Rohit Shetty; Sushwanth Prakash; Sneha Shetty Kohli
- Starring: Sidharth Malhotra; Shilpa Shetty Kundra; Vivek Oberoi
- Music by: Akashdeep Sengupta; Lijo George-DJ Chetas; Abhishek-Ananya
- Opening theme: Amar Mohile
- Country of origin: India
- Original language: Hindi
- No. of seasons: 1
- No. of episodes: 7

Production
- Producer: Rohit Shetty
- Cinematography: Girish Kant; Raza Hussain Mehta
- Editor: Bunty Nagi
- Camera setup: Multi-camera
- Running time: 45–50 minutes
- Production companies: Rohit Shetty Picturez; Reliance Entertainment

Original release
- Network: Amazon Prime Video
- Release: 19 January 2024

Related
- Cop Universe

Indian Police Force is an Indian Hindi-language action thriller television series that streams on Amazon Prime Video. It is created and directed by Rohit Shetty and Sushwanth Prakash. Set in the Cop Universe, it is produced by Shetty under the banner of Rohit Shetty Picturez and Reliance Entertainment. It stars Sidharth Malhotra, Shilpa Shetty, and Vivek Oberoi.

== Plot ==
DCP Kabir Malik and his senior officer Joint CP Vikram Bakshi go on to investigate a series of bomb blasts in Delhi during the Delhi Police Raising Day. The serial blasts were committed by Zarar, an Indian Mujahideen (IM) terrorist, who is living under a fake identity as Haider. Vikram and Kabir stop some of the five serial blasts and are asked to collaborate with Vikram's classmate Tara Shetty, ATS Chief of Gujarat. They track down a suspect called Shadab, through sketches and witness accounts, and also learn about his hideout through an undercover officer.

Later, Kabir and Vikram decide to follow their lead without consulting Tara. However, their operation leads to an intense encounter between the agents and Zarar’s associates. Zarar takes a kid as a hostage after most of his associates are killed and Shadab is arrested; he shoots Vikram twice. Vikram succumbs to his injuries and dies. Kabir faces internal conflict with Tara and gets removed from the case. After a series of bombings in Jaipur, Kabir collaborates to investigate and his relentless pursuit leads him to suspect Zarar, who is in Darbhanga and is planning major attacks with new accomplices and financial support.

Zarar and his team prepare for the bombings, but Kabir and Tara, following some leads, manage to thwart some attacks and arrest members of Zarar’s team. However, Zarar manages to escape again and Kabir tracks Zarar to Darbhanga. Meanwhile, after the Jaipur attacks Zarar marries Nafisa, whose father was also part of Zarar's team though Nafisa and her family had no idea about the same. Later Kabir reveals Zarar's true identity to Nafeesa. She faints after knowing this as she is pregnant with Zarar's child and is taken to hospital. Zarar contacts her in the Hospital and convinces her to come to him and she agrees, but on the news, she hears that Zarar's parents are alive about which Zarar lied to her. She reveals to Kabir and his team that Zarar will pick up her in Bangladesh via train. Zarar leaves for Bangladesh and Kabir learns about his exact location through Nafisa. Kabir and Rana head for Bangladesh and meet up with Jagtap, Vikram and Tara's friend from the academy and a RAW agent.

Kabir, Rana, and Jagtap ambush Zarar and his men at the station as Zarar was waiting for Nafeesa to arrive. Jagtap also spots Rafeeq and tries to capture him, but to no avail. After a brief chase through the streets by Kabir, Zarar is captured and taken to a safe house at the India-Bangladesh border before being transported back to Delhi. Tara reunites with Kabir and Jagtap, deciding to leave for the mission of capturing IM's leader and their team, including Rafeeq, who was spotted in Kathmandu.

== Cast ==
- Sidharth Malhotra as DCP Kabir Malik IPS
- Vivek Oberoi as Joint CP Vikram Bakshi IPS
- Shilpa Shetty as Tara Shetty IPS, Former Chief of Gujarat ATS and Chief of Delhi Police Special Cell
- Sharad Kelkar as Jagtap, a R&AW agent
- Isha Talwar as Rashmi Malik, Kabir's wife
- Mayyank Taandon as Zarar / Haider
- Mukesh Rishi as DGP Jaideep Bansal IPS
- Rituraj Singh as Rafeeq Ahmad
- Mrinal Kulkarni as Rukhsana Malik, Kabir's mother
- Shweta Tiwari as Shruti Bakshi, Vikram's wife
- Nikitin Dheer as Inspector Rana Virk
- Vaidehi Parshurami as Nafeesa Khan
- Pradeep Kabra as Balwinder Singh
- Lalit Parimoo as Saeed Khan
- Suchitra Bandekar as Farida
- Vipul Deshpande as Amar Singh
- Sooraj Ohri as Suraj
- Karanvir Malhotra as Sikku
- Shruti Panwar as Unaiza
- Sharvari Lokhare as Rubina
- Vibhuti Thakur as Zara
- Sunil Rodrigues as Goldie Rodrigues
- Harsh Sharma as Salamat
- Arjun Dwivedi as Bangladesh Intelligence Head

== Episodes ==
No. overall	No. in season	Title	Original release date
1	1	"Delhi Police Raising Day"	January 19, 2024
2	2	"One Wrong Call"	January 19, 2024
3	3	"The Hunt"	January 19, 2024
4	4	"The Ghost Is Back"	January 19, 2024
5	5	"The Loss"	January 19, 2024
6	6	"The Truth"	January 19, 2024
7	7	"Home Coming"	January 19, 2024

== Production ==
=== Casting ===
Sidharth Malhotra was cast as the lead role, and was joined by Shilpa Shetty, Shweta Tiwari, Vivek Oberoi and Nikitin Dheer.

=== Development ===
The series was announced by Rohit Shetty in April 2022. The first look teaser featuring Sidharth Malhotra were unveiled in April 2022 on Amazon Prime Video. Shilpa, Sidharth and Rohit were spotted at the Mumbai Airport before leaving for Goa, Maharashtra on 9 May 2022.

=== Filming ===
The series was primarily shot in Mumbai, Maharashtra, Goa, Delhi NCR, Hyderabad, Jaipur, and Dhaka. The principal photography of the series started in March 2022. The first schedule kickstarted in Mumbai. Filming then moved to Goa where a fight scene was shot from 12 May, and ended in May 2022, before Shetty left for Cape Town to shoot Khatron Ke Khiladi 12. in August 2022, filming happened at Mehboob Studio in Mumbai where a fight scene was shot. In November 2022, filming happened in Delhi NCR. Filming took place at India Gate, Red Fort, Old Delhi, Lodi Gardens, Sharda University, and a song was shot at Humayun's tomb. In January 2023, filming took place at Ramoji Film City, Hyderabad where some action scenes were shot including the climax. In August 2023, a small schedule took place in Jaipur.

== Release ==
On 18 April 2022, Amazon Prime Video announced the series officially with a first look and teaser being released. The series was released on 18 January 2024, a day ahead of its original release date.

== Reception ==
=== Critical response ===
On the review aggregator website Rotten Tomatoes, 18% of 11 critics' reviews are positive, with an average rating of 3.7/10.

Archika Khurana of The Times of India gave the series a 3/5 star rating, writing, "Despite the predictability in the storyline, Indian Police Force is recommended for its novelty in delivering a high-packed action series in the digital space. The half-hourly episode format enhances its appeal, making it a worthy watch for fans of the Cop Universe and those seeking engaging content in the web series realm." Rishil Jogani of Pinkvilla gave 3/5 rating, said that "Indian Police Force is a typical Rohit Shetty style show which has the merits and demerits that each of his previous films possess. For those who admire his kind of cinema, watching the series becomes an absolute no-brainer."

Trisha Bhattacharya of India Today gave a mixed review of 2.5/5 stars, writing, "The narrative, though riveting, occasionally succumbs to predictability, relying on well-worn tropes of the crime thriller genre. The series could benefit from more innovative storytelling choices and plot twists to elevate it beyond the standard fare." Aishwarya Vasudevan at OTTplay gave 2.5/5 rating, stating that "When it comes to the world of police dramas, Indian Police Force makes an effort to carve out a certain place for itself; nonetheless, it doesn't seem like the roaring patrol car that is synonymous with other cop films by Rohit Shetty. The series fails to reach the heart-pounding crescendo that the Cop Universe is known for."

Deepa Galhot of Rediff.com gave 2/5 rating, stating that "Rohit Shetty's strengths have been action and humour; the former he delivers in spades, but the latter is totally lacking in Indian Police Force." Shubhra Gupta of The Indian Express gave a negative review of 1.5/5 rating, writing, "Rohit Shetty has spread over seven episodes the things he does in two-and-a-half-hours of his blockbuster cop sagas -- evil Muslim terrorists balanced by brave Muslim cops, clunky plots to demolish innocent lives, and scores of cars and jeeps cartwheeling in the air."

Devansh Sharma of Hindustan Times said that "Rohit Shetty's streaming debut is wired very differently from his tentpole movies, but that doesn't imply it's any better." Shilajit Mitra of The Hindu gave a verdict "Though less bombastic than his action features, ‘Indian Police Force’ registers little forward momentum in Shetty’s cinematic style; the cop universe has reached maximum entropy."
