= Zapak =

Indian online gaming portal

- Logo
- Website type: Online Gaming
- Available in: English
- Owner: Anil Dhirubhai Ambani Group
- Subsidiaries: Zapakmail (Defunct)
- Website: https://www.zapak.com
- Launched: 2006

Zapak.com is an Indian online gaming portal, with browser games promoted by the Anil Dhirubhai Ambani Group's subsidiary company Reliance Big Entertainment. It was launched in 2006.

As of 2009, Zapak had over 6 million registered users and contained over 5,000 games on its platform.

== Popularity ==
Zapak games had achieved 100 million downloads. It became widely popular on Nokia Store and other platforms. In addition, Zapak also launched Game zones in multiple malls at Fun Republic malls in Chandigarh, Ahmedabad, Lucknow and Mumbai. Zapak also partnered with various companies like RuneScape, Disney Corporation and Turner Entertainment.

In 2018, Zapak launched Little Singham, a mobile game based on the film Singham.

== Zapakmail ==
In early 2007, Zapak introduced Zapakmail, a fast email service. It offered an unlimited mailbox capacity for users. Zapak users can even send attachments totaling 32MB. This eases the user's task of sending large files over the mail respectively. It broke all records for user registrations in one day, and it registered around 1,15,263 users. Zapakmail had also launched its lite version for mobile phones for ease of accessibility. As of 26 February 2009, Zapak ceased its email services.

== Partnership with Lead Eastern Group ==
As per 2015, Zapak sold its 10% Stake to a Chinese corporate company Lead Eastern Group with amount of $15 million. Zapak has been accompanied with a three way joint venture between Reliance Games, Lead Eastern and Creative Cultural where they will hold 40%, 51% and 9% stakes.
