= Singham =

2011 Indian film by Rohit Shetty

- Theatrical release poster
- Directed by: Rohit Shetty
- Screenplay by: Yunus Sajawal
- Dialogues by: Farhad-Sajid
- Story by: Hari
- Based on: Singam by Hari
- Produced by: Reliance Entertainment
- Starring: Ajay Devgn; Kajal Aggarwal; Prakash Raj
- Cinematography: Dudley
- Edited by: Steven H. Bernard
- Music by: Score: Amar Mohile; Songs: Ajay–Atul
- Production company: Reliance Entertainment
- Distributed by: Reliance Entertainment
- Release date: 22 July 2011
- Running time: 143 minutes
- Country: India
- Language: Hindi
- Budget: ₹41 crore
- Box office: est. ₹141.3 crore

Singham is a 2011 Indian Hindi-language action film directed by Rohit Shetty and produced by Reliance Entertainment. A remake of the 2010 Tamil film Singam by Hari, the film stars Ajay Devgn as the titular character Bajirao, an honest police officer, while Kajal Aggarwal, who returns to Hindi films in her first full–fledged role, and Prakash Raj, who reprises his role from the original film, appear as leads.

Singham marked Devgn's and Shetty's return to the action genre after eight years. It was theatrically released in India on 22 July 2011 with generally positive reviews from the critics towards praise for action-emotional drama, dialogues and homage to 70s masala films. It opened with strong box office response; the film earned ₹87.6 million in India on the first day and a worldwide total of ₹1.41 billion against a ₹410 million budget, becoming a box-office commercial success.

Singham gained a cult film status over the years, particularly for Devgn's portrayal of Bajirao and Raj's portrayal of Shikre. After the film's success at the box office, Devgn and Shetty collaborated for the sequels Singham Returns (2014) and Singham Again (2024). Devgn reprised his role in Shetty's directorials of Simmba (2018) and Sooryavanshi (2021), which together form Shetty's Cop Universe.

== Plot ==
Inspector Rakesh Kadam, an honest officer, is falsely accused of corruption by Jaikant Shikre, a powerful crime boss, politician, and businessman running illegal rackets in Goa. Unable to bear the disgrace, Kadam commits suicide. His widow, Megha, vows revenge, declaring that justice will prevail.

The story shifts to Shivgad, a village near the Goa-Maharashtra border, where Bajirao Singham, an upright Maratha police officer, commands the local police station. Respected for his informal yet effective problem-solving methods, Singham wins the villagers' admiration. His father Manikrao's childhood friend, industrialist Gautam Bhosle, visits Shivgad with his family, including his daughter Kavya. A series of comedic incidents lead to Kavya falling in love with Singham, admiring his integrity and simplicity.

Everything runs smooth until Jaikant, out on conditional bail for murder, is required to report to Shivgad every 2 weeks but sends a proxy. Enraged, Singham demands that Jaikant sign in person. Jaikant arrives with his army of goons and threatens Singham with his political and criminal connections, but backs off on being intimidated by the villagers, who warn to finish him off out of admiration for Singham after hearing his threats. Humiliated by Singham in front of the villagers, an egoistic Jaikant uses his political influence to transfer Singham to Goa, where he begins a campaign of harassment. In Goa, upon joining, Singham, through his colleagues Abbas, Phadnis and Savalkar, and Megha, discovers the extent of Jaikant's criminal empire, supported by corrupt officials like DSP Satyam Patkar, who is his senior, and Home minister Narvekar, while also learning of Kadam's suicide.

Being mentally tortured after several attempts to intimidate him are successful, Singham decides to move back to Shivgad. However, encouraged by Kavya, Singham gains motivation and starts dismantling Jaikant's operations by arresting his righthand man, Shiva, on trumped-up charges. Shiva's arrest reveals Jaikant's involvement in Kadam's downfall, along with other crimes like extortion, money laundering, and murder. Jaikant escalates the conflict by kidnapping Kavya's sister Anjali, but Singham rescues her and captures one of his minions, ultimately linking to Jaikant and Shiva. Jaikant's political party wins the election, and he becomes a minister, further complicating matters. Upon victory, Jaikant issues transfer orders for Singham, forcing him to leave Goa within 24 hours, while Shiva gives a statement protecting Jaikant.

At a police function the same night, Singham, arriving with Megha and Kadam's son, accuses his colleagues of betraying their duty by protecting Jaikant, and vows to finish him off single-handedly. Filled with guilt in front of their family members, the officers, including DGP Pawar, get motivated to join his fight. With the support of the entire Goa Police Force, including Patkar, who has a change of heart, Singham leads a raid on Jaikant's residence, who escapes after feigning an emotional monologue. Running throughout the city, Jaikant is captured after a dramatic chase and is shot dead by Singham in a staged encounter, seated in Kadam's chair, and Shiva is forced to change his statement at gunpoint. At a press conference, the team exposes Jaikant's crimes with Shiva's confession, clears Kadam's name, and restores Megha's dignity. The film concludes with Singham and his colleagues saluting Megha, symbolizing the triumph of justice and integrity.

== Cast ==
- Ajay Devgn as Inspector Bajirao Singham
- Kajal Aggarwal as Kavya Bhosale
- Prakash Raj as Jaikant Shikre
- Sudhanshu Pandey as Inspector Rakesh Kadam (special appearance)
- Sonali Kulkarni as Megha Kadam
- Sachin Khedekar as Gautam "Gotya" Bhosale
- Govind Namdev as Manikrao "Manya" Singham, Bajirao's father
- Meghna Vaidya as Lata Singham, Bajirao's mother
- Ashok Saraf as Head-Constable Prabhu Sawalkar
- Murali Sharma as DSP Satyam Patkar
- Ashok Samarth as Shiva Nayak, Jaikant's right-hand
- Ankur Nayyar as Sub-Inspector Abbas Malik
- Vijay Patkar as Havaldar Ramesh Kelkar
- Sana Amin Sheikh as Anjali BhosaleKavya's sister
- Anant Jog as Minister Anant Narvekar
- Besant Ravi as Sangam Talkies Goon
- Vineet Sharma as Sub-Inspector Dev Phadnis
- Suchitra Bandekar as Savita Bhosale. Kavya's mother
- Kishore Nandlaskar as Narvekar's peon
- Naushad Abbas as Jaikant's henchman
- Hari Bala as Nandu Singh, a villager in Shivgarh
- Vikash Kadam as Sadha Singh, a villager in Shivgarh
- Pradeep Velankar as DGP Vikram Pawar, Goa Police
- Harish Shetty as Vitthal Dalvi, Jaikant's ally
- Jayant Sawarkar as Kamalkant Bhosale, Kavya's grandfather
- Suhasini Deshpande as Suhasini Bhosale, Kavya's grandmother
- Ravindra Berde as Zamindar Chandrakant
- Agastya Dhanorkar as Nitin, Rakesh Kadam's son
- Neeraj Khetrapal as Jaikant's lawyer

== Production ==
Following the success of the Tamil film Singam (2010) directed by Hari, the film's remake rights were sold by the producers for Hindi and Kannada versions. The co-producers of the Tamil version, Reliance Big Pictures purchased the Hindi remake rights and announced in November 2010 that the remake would be directed by Rohit Shetty and feature Ajay Devgn in the lead role.

=== Casting ===
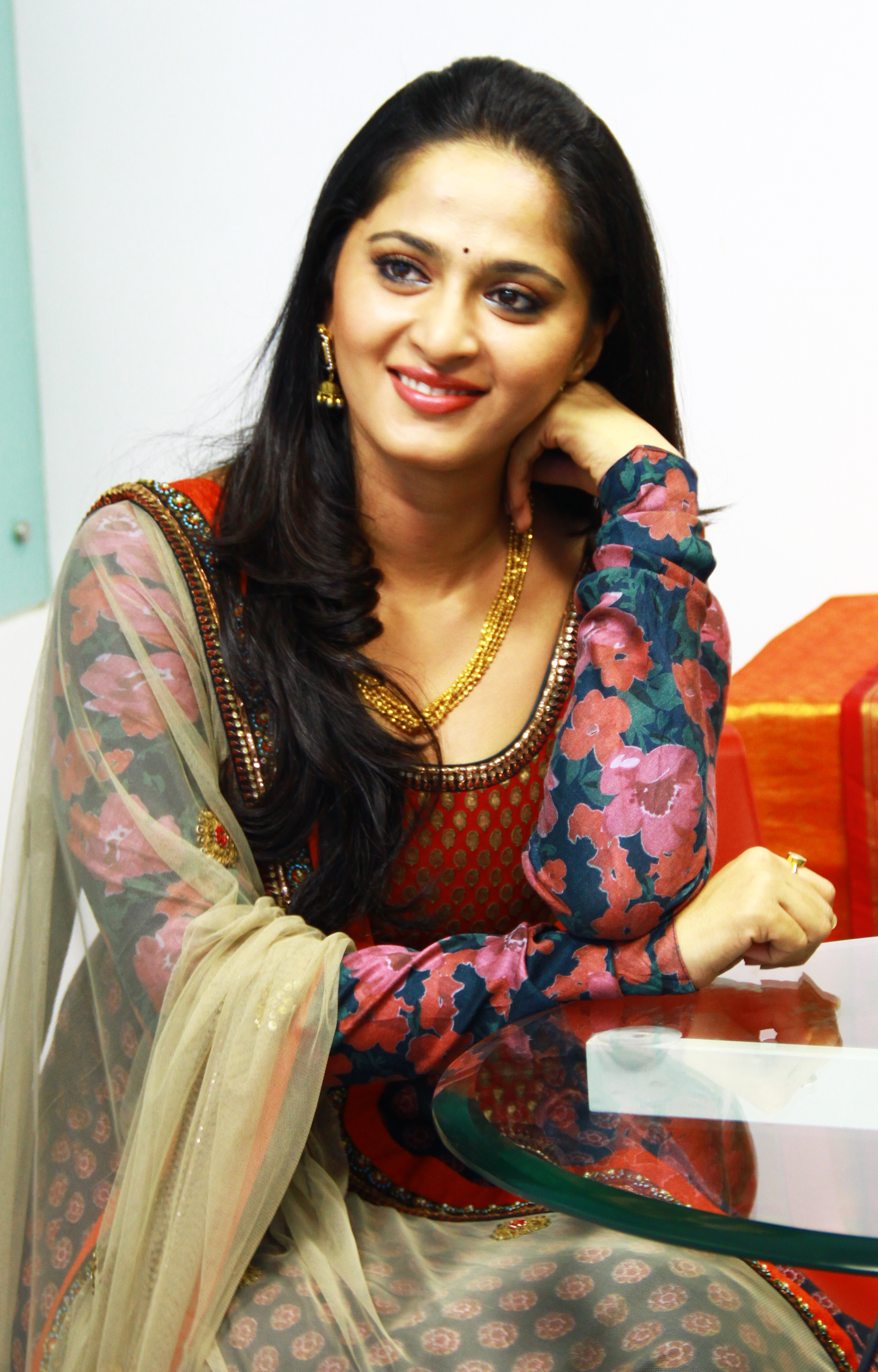
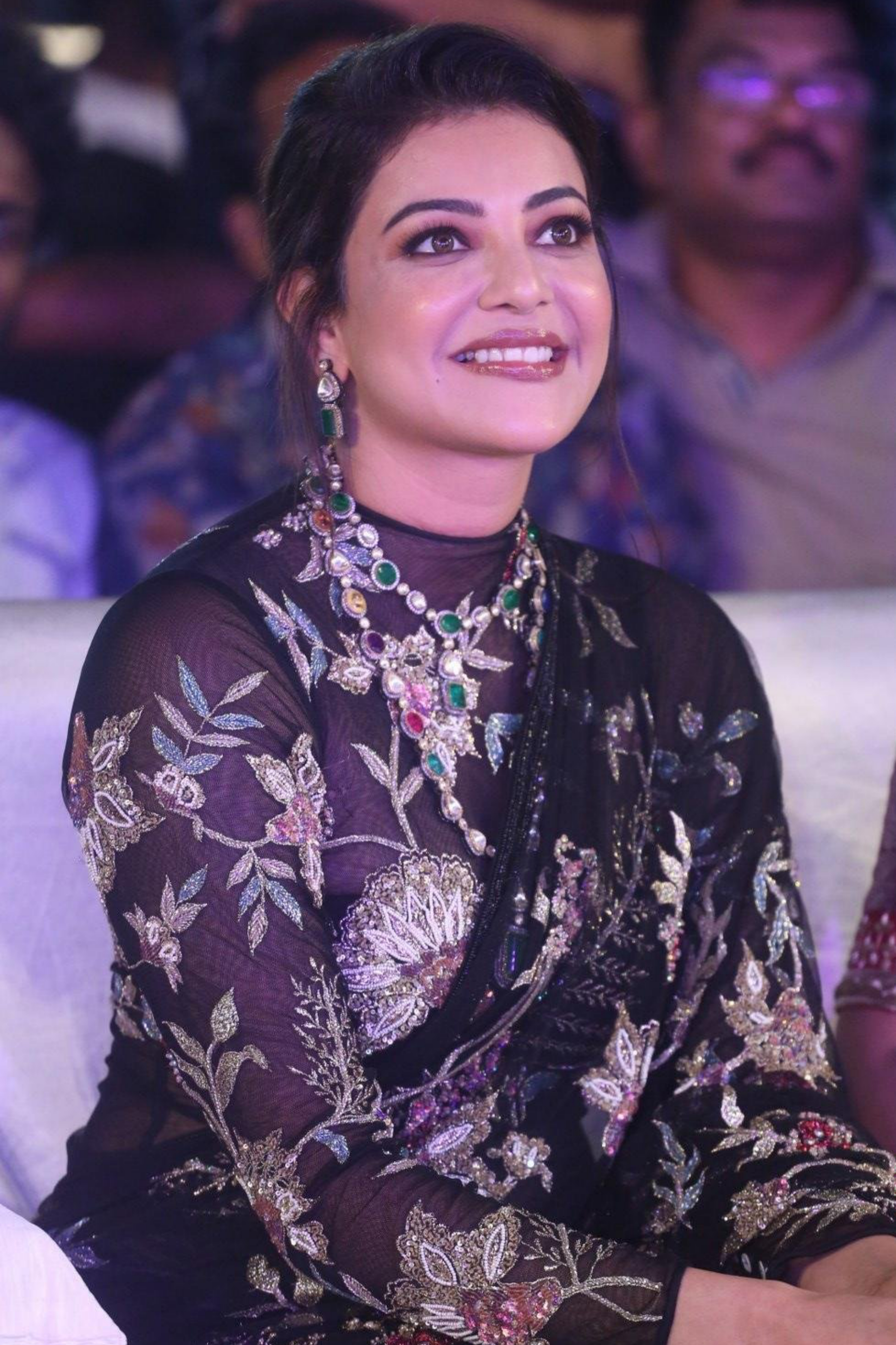
Anushka Shetty (top) was cast as the main female lead but was subsequently replaced by Kajal Aggarwal (bottom) due to unavailability of dates.

Prakash Raj was signed on to reprise his role as the antagonist from the original, whilst reports emerged that Asin and Anushka Shetty were being considered for the female lead role.

In mid-February 2011, Kajal Aggarwal, an actress who predominantly features in South Indian films was signed in as the female lead.

Singham went on floors in November 2010, with its scheduled cast. The first schedule began in early March 2011 with action sequences shot in Goa featuring technicians from South India.

A scene with Prakash Raj and Ajay Devgn was shot in Goregaon in Mumbai with around 500 junior artists as villagers. Another scene was shot at Vagator in Goa for which 100 police jeeps were called. The shooting was stalled by the Federation of Western India Cine Employees (FWICE) members who demanded ₹45 lakh to be paid to the workers when it was being shot in Film City in Mumbai.

== Release ==
Reliance Entertainment released Singham on 22 July 2011 in 2000 screens worldwide with 1500 prints excluding overseas.

The film's DVD was released on 23 August 2011. The Delhi High Court, upon Reliance Entertainment's request, issued an order to all Indian ISPs to block file sharing sites to prevent unauthorized sharing of Singham.

A promotional mobile video game was released the same year as a tie-in product for the film.

Ahead of the Singham Again release, Singham was re-released theatrically on 18 October 2024.

== Reception ==
=== Critical reception ===
The film received mixed to positive reviews from critics. Nikhat Kazmi of The Times of India gave it four out of five stars and stated "Singham is over-the-top retro kitsch, spilling over with high-voltage stunts, slow-motion action cuts and fiery dialogues delivered in high decibels. It is meant for all those action buffs interested in time travel to the angry young 1970s and 1980s when cinema was larger-than-life and totally unrealistic. But then, retro is currently chic, isn't it?" Komal Nahta of Koimoi gave it four and a half stars out of five and said "On the whole, Singham is a powerful action-emotional drama which boasts of equally powerful dialogues and absolutely power-packed performances. It's a super-hit and will be loved by the masses and the classes, the men and the women, the young and the old, the rich and the poor. It is the kind of film which consumes the viewer and gives him the feeling that he was part of the fight against corruption! The film has immense repeat-value. Its business in Maharashtra will get a further boost because of the liberal use of Marathi in the dialogues. Kajal Aggarwal acts with effortless ease. Her performance is good."
Suparna Sharma of The Asian Age gave it two out of five stars and stated "Singham is a primitive, archetypal genre piece, and it is a hit. Rohit Shetty taps into the sentiment of the moment – emasculation, frustration – and gratifies it. But endowing a cop with nobility doesn't ring true, especially not when he is neither Chulbul-charming nor when the target of his anger and lashing is generic sleaze... Singham is vigilante cop let loose on all things foul. I felt fluctuating connect with Singham, but mostly he made me queasy." Taran Adarsh of Bollywood Hungama gave the film four and a half stars out of five and said "Singham pays homage to the action films of the 1970s, which was known for the heroism, death-defying action sequences and pulse-pounding thrills. It's an acknowledgement to one of the most successful genres of Bollywood – action movies – known for the trademark good versus evil themes and well-choreographed stunts." Saibal Chatterjee from NDTV also gave four out of five stars and said "Singham is an old-fashioned but rousing Hindi commercial film that pretty much restores one's faith in this often-maligned brand of cinema. It has super-duper hit written all over it. No matter how dismissive you might be of films that have no space for shades of grey, chances are that Singham will disarm you, if only for a bit." Dailybhaskar gave a score of three stars out of five and said "The action takes over the romance in the film. Go for it, if you want to catch one hell of an action flick! "

Sukanya Venkatraghavan from Filmfare gave two stars out of five and said "Singham is a film that will invoke wolf whistles and applause from its audience. It is gloriously massy. The movie knows its job and does it well. It does nothing out of the box to grab your attention and yet it does. Pretty easily. Watch it for its robust potboiler personality. With extra masala as garnish. Ajay Devgan pulls out all stops for this one. He is fierce and impactful. This is his show all the way. His quirky forte for comedy too comes forth in the ubiquitous ha ha sequences with leading lady Kajal Aggarwal who looks pretty and has done what she has been told to but probably deserved a meatier debut." Kaveree Bamzai from India Today gave three out of five stars and deemed that "Mr Devgn tries hard, growling like a Singham, and acting like a superman, but I was more interested in Prakash Raj's two tone Al Capone shoes." Raja Sen from Rediff gave one and a half stars out of five and said "All I can personally say about this trend of remaking one-note Southern hits as a viewer is that it's an exhausting one. It is in the tiny victories that we must seek refuge after a film like this: I'm just glad the hero, so eager to peel off his uniform, left his pants on." Sudhish Kamath from The Hindu said "The original wasn't the best film around but it had a few smarts, pace and fury, and worked despite its cheesy visual effects purely because of Suriya who made the corniest lines sound good. Devgn does exactly the opposite. He takes some half-decent lines (by Farhad and Sajid) and makes them sound cheesy." Rajeev Masand of CNN-IBN gave 2 stars out of 5, commenting "Remake of the 2010 Tamil blockbuster of the same name, 'Singham' has occasional bursts of comedy (both puerile and genuinely funny), but it's never quite as entertaining as the similarly intentioned 'Dabangg'."

Shubha Shetty Saha from MiD DAY gave the film a score of two stars and deemed that "Nothing turns director Rohit Shetty on more than cars meeting midair. We all know that by now. And this film has some breath-taking action sequences, too. That's about it is." Meenakshi Rao from The Pioneer describes the film as "the David Dhawan of action, or for that matter the Golmaal of fights. To keep the audience engaged all through such unending babble needs some kind of acumen which normal people do not always have and through which people like Rohit Shetty get to make a whole lot of money, if not sense." giving it seven out of ten stars. Kunal Guha from Yahoo! Movies gave two stars and says that "The film's assumption that mispronunciation is funny makes us endure words like honest (with a loud 'h'), clean cheet (clean chit), noun-saans (nonsense) and sooocide (suicide). The dialogues are spouted with immense enthusiasm, but the words defuse the intensity and make them seem trivial. Devgn does a fair job and conveys sufficient conviction and humility through his character. Kajal Aggarwal makes an unobjectionable debut and her eyes would surely inspire a few compliments."

=== Box office ===
Singham started extremely well at single screens with occupancy around 90% and was average at multiplexes with 50%–60% occupancy, In the first four days, the film collected ₹350 million (US$7.5 million). After five days, the earnings were around ₹407.5 million (US$8.73 million) without any drop. The opening week gross collections were ₹442 million (US$9.47 million) in India and ₹35 million (US$749,909.48) from overseas to fetch a total opening week gross of ₹477 million (US$10.22 million), thus putting the nett weekend collections at ₹475.7 million (US$10.19 million), including ₹120 million (US$2.57 million) in Mumbai area alone. In the second week, it collected ₹263.4 million (US$5.64 million) nett to take the total two-week net collections at ₹777.4 million (US$16.66 million). The film is currently the sixth highest second week grosser. The third weekend collections were estimated to be ₹82.0 million (US$1.76 million). After three weeks, the nett collections amounted to ₹861.7 million (US$18.46 million). It collected ₹65.0 million (US$1.39 million) in its fourth week bringing its collections to ₹926.7 million (US$19.86 million) in four weeks. Singham earned ₹980.0 million (US$21 million) nett in India, at the end of its theatrical run.

The film grossed over ₹1,400 million (US$30 million) worldwide. It has grossed a total of ₹1,478.9 million (US$31.69 million) worldwide, including ₹1,393.1 million (US$29.85 million) in India and $1.25 million (₹85.8 million) overseas.

== Soundtrack ==
The music of the film was composed by Ajay–Atul, with lyrics penned by Swanand Kirkire.

== Accolades ==
Award Ceremony	Category	Result	Ref.(s)
4th Mirchi Music Awards	Best Background Score of the Year	Nominated	

== Controversy ==
Singham had been removed from cinemas in Karnataka while some cinemas had cancelled the shows following pressure from various groups protesting against derogatory statements against the Kannadigas. Various organisations raised voices against the anti-Kannadiga dialogues in Singham and the film which was released faced problems in continuing with the shows. There was a demand to remove such scenes from the film and the filmmakers contemplated on the next course of action.

== Legacy ==
The music video for the 2020 Black Eyed Peas song "Action" pays tribute to Indian film action scenes, including Singham.

=== Animated series ===
An animated series based on Singham premiered on Discovery Kids (India) in April 2018.

=== Sequel and chapters ===
Singham Returns, a sequel to Singham directed by Shetty and produced by Ajay Devgn Films, released in 2014. Devgn reprises his role from the previous film, while also co-producing the project. Kareena Kapoor plays the female lead, replacing Aggarwal. The film was also simultaneously made in Marathi. The film was released worldwide on 15 August 2014. The plot is loosely based on the 1993 Malayalam film Ekalavyan.

Simmba, a second chapter of the universe directed by Shetty and produced by Dharma Productions, was released in 2018. Starring Ranveer Singh, the film features Sangram "Simmba" Bhalerao, a corrupt cop hailing from the same town as Singham. Devgn reprises his role in a special appearance. A third chapter of the universe, Sooryavanshi, starring Akshay Kumar as another DCP named Veer Sooryavanshi who join hands with Simmba and Singham to stop a terrorist attack on Mumbai is directed again by Shetty.

The fifth installment, Singham Again, was announced in December 2022 and released in November 2024, with Ajay Devgn reprising his role as Singham.
