= Rohit Shetty =

Indian filmmaker and host (born 1974)

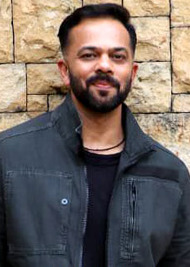
- Shetty at JW Marriott, Juhu in 2019
- Born: 14 March 1974 (age 52); Mangaluru, Karnataka, India
- Occupations: Film director; producer; stuntman; writer; host
- Years active: 1991–present
- Works: Full List
- Spouse: Maya Shetty (m. 2005)
- Parent: M. B. Shetty (father)
- Relatives: Hriday Shetty (half-brother)

Rohit Shetty (born 14 March 1974) is an Indian director, screenwriter, stuntman, producer and television personality who works in Hindi cinema. A notable director of Hindi cinema, his film often mix the genres of action comedy and masala films.

His breakthrough came with the first installment of the comedy film franchise Golmaal (2006), starring Ajay Devgn, Tusshar Kapoor and Arshad Warsi, which became a sleeper hit. Further subsequent successes in the franchise included Golmaal Returns (2008), Golmaal 3 (2010) and Golmaal Again (2017), each of which went on to rank among the highest-grossing films of the year.

Shetty returned to the action genre with Singham (2011) after eight years of his debut action thriller Zameen (2003), which also starred Devgn in the lead; the film turned out to be one of the highest grossers of the year. Later on, it expanded into the Cop Universe with other successful films such as Singham Returns (2014), Simmba (2018) and Sooryavanshi (2021). His other notable successes include All the Best: Fun Begins (2009), Bol Bachchan (2012), and Chennai Express (2013); the latter became the highest grossing Hindi film, surpassing 3 Idiots at that time.

Apart from film directing, he has also hosts the stunt-based adventure show Fear Factor: Khatron Ke Khiladi since 2014.

== Early life ==
Shetty was born to M. B. Shetty, an action choreographer and Ratna, a junior artist. His father belonged to the Tulu-speaking community from Mangalore, while his mother was from Madhya Pradesh. His grandmother is from Afghanistan. Shetty speaks Hindi at home.

== Career ==
=== 1991–2002: Early work ===
Shetty began his career at the age of 17 as an assistant director in Ajay Devgn's first film Phool Aur Kaante. He then worked with Devgn in Suhaag (where he was a body double for Akshay Kumar, who was its second main hero) and Haqeeqat, and with Kumar in Zulmi. He then joined the Devgn starrers Pyaar To Hona Hi Tha, Hindustan Ki Kasam and Raju Chacha.

=== 2003–2009: Directorial debut and breakthrough ===
Shetty debuted as an independent director in 2003 with the Devgn starrer Zameen, an average grosser, before he rose to fame in 2006 when he directed the first part of Devgn's cult comedy series Golmaal that became his first hit. His next two directorials—the comic thriller Sunday and the successful sequel of Golmaal named Golmaal Returns (both featuring Devgn)–were released theatrically in 2008 followed by All the Best: Fun Begins in 2009.

=== 2010–2021: Commercial success ===
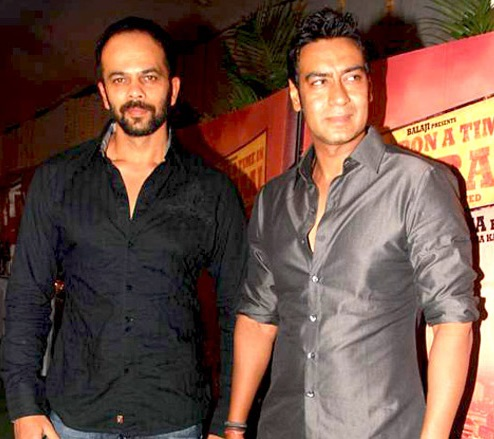
Shetty (left) and Ajay Devgn in 2010. They have worked together in 10 films since 2003

The third part of Golmaal series titled Golmaal 3 (again starring Devgn) that opened theatrically in 2010 ended up as Shetty's first and an surprising blockbuster that entered 100 Crore Club domestically. Continuing his collaborations with Devgn, Shetty begun his Cop Universe in 2011 through his action film Singham (that saw Devgn portray a police inspector fighting against corruption) and directed the comedy Bol Bachchan (also featuring Abhishek Bachchan) in 2012; both films were super hits and crossed 100 Crore Club domestically.

Shetty's Chennai Express, starring Shah Rukh Khan and Deepika Padukone, was released on 9 August 2013. Chennai Express became the highest-grossing Bollywood film in the domestic market. The film earned over US$17.4 million to become the third-highest-grossing Bollywood film overseas. The film also set a number of box office records, for the highest opening-day gross, highest paid preview, highest single-day gross, biggest opening weekend, highest opening week and the fastest film to reach ₹100 crore and ₹2 billion in the domestic market.

Shetty has played the judge of the television show Comedy Circus.

In 2014, Shetty directed Singham Returns with Ajay Devgn, a sequel to his 2011 film Singham. He was also a part of the fifth season of television stunt game show Fear Factor: Khatron Ke Khiladi in 2014 as the host taking over from the previous host Akshay Kumar. In 2014, he turned into a producer with Singham Returns, co-producing the film under his banner Rohit Shetty Productions. He directed Dilwale with Shah Rukh Khan and Kajol, which was a moderate box-office success. He reprised his role as host in season 6 and 8–11 of Fear Factor: Khatron Ke Khiladi.

Shetty next directed Golmaal Again, the fourth film of the Golmaal series. The film, starring Ajay Devgn and Parineeti Chopra in the lead roles, was released in October 2017, and received mixed reviews. It became the highest grossing Hindi film in 2017, the first Hindi blockbuster of 2017. He directed then directed the 2018 action comedy, Simmba, starring Ranveer Singh, Sara Ali Khan and Sonu Sood in the lead roles, with Ajay Devgn in a guest appearance as Bajirao Singham.

Shetty directed another feature in the Cop Universe, Sooryavanshi, starring Akshay Kumar, Katrina Kaif and Jackie Shroff, which was released during Diwali in 2021. It was the first major release from Hindi Cinema after lockdown due to COVID-19, the film became highest grossing Hindi film of the year. Shetty has made his OTT debut with Indian Police Force, starring Sidharth Malhotra for Amazon Prime Video.

=== 2022–present: Career fluctuations ===
In 2022, Shetty took break from action films and directed period comedy drama Cirkus, loosely adapted from William Shakespeare's The Comedy of Errors. It stars Ranveer Singh and Varun Sharma, both in double roles, alongside Pooja Hegde and Jacqueline Fernandez. The film was both a major critical and commercial failure, holding a 0% rating on Rotten Tomatoes, and emerged as one of the biggest flops of 2022. The film was also his first commercial failure.

The following year, Shetty marked his Marathi film debut by producing the coming-of-age romantic film School College Ani Life (2023), directed by Vihan Suryavanshi and starring Karan Parab, Tejasswi Prakash, and Jitendra Joshi. Shetty had been planning to do a Marathi film from a long time on the demand of his regional fans. Anub George of The Times of India wrote a mixed review, criticizing the slow second act and clichéd plot, but praised the cast performances and cinematography, writing, "the film offers multiple moments of pure joy and emotion in a visual treat of an experience."

He returned to directing with Singham Again (2024), the fifth installment of the Cop Universe. Ajay Devgn stars the film, reprising his title role of Bajirao Singham, alongside an ensemble star cast that includes Akshay Kumar, Ranveer Singh, Tiger Shroff, Kareena Kapoor Khan, Deepika Padukone, Arjun Kapoor and Jackie Shroff. The film released on Diwali to mixed to negative reviews, with vital criticism focused on its clichéd storyline, illogical scenes, lack of originality, and poor adaptation of Ramayana's plot, while some critics praised its action sequences and mass appeal. The film was made on a high budget of ₹375 crore, making it one of the most expensive Indian films of all time, but underperformed theatrically, earning ₹389 crore globally, despite being one of the highest grossing Indian films of 2024. However, Singham Again made profit through the sale of its satellite, music, and streaming rights, earning around ₹180-₹200 crore. It eventually emerged as a moderate success financially.

== Filmography ==
Key
†	Denotes films that have not yet been released

=== Film ===
Year	Title	Director	Producer	Notes
2003	Zameen	✓		
2006	Golmaal: Fun Unlimited	✓		
2008	Sunday	✓		Remake of Anukokunda Oka Roju
2008	Golmaal Returns	✓		Based on Aaj Ki Taaza Khabar
2009	All The Best	✓		Based on the English play Right Bed, Wrong Husband
2010	Golmaal 3	✓		
2011	Singham	✓		Remake of Singam
2012	Bol Bachchan	✓		Based on Gol Maal
2013	Chennai Express	✓		
2014	Singham Returns	✓	✓	Remake of Ekalavyan
2015	Dilwale	✓	✓	
2017	Golmaal Again	✓	✓	
2018	Simmba	✓	✓	Remake of Temper
2021	Sooryavanshi	✓	✓	
2022	Cirkus	✓	✓	Remake of Angoor
2023	School College Ani Life		✓	Marathi film
2024	Singham Again	✓	✓	
2027	Golmaal 5 †	✓	✓	

=== Television ===
Year	Title	Role	Ref.
2009–2011	Comedy Circus	Judge	
2012	Big Switch	Host	
2012	Taarak Mehta Ka Ooltah Chashmah	Guest	
2014–2015, 2017, 2019–2024, 2026	Khatron Ke Khiladi	Host	
2015	Bigg Boss Halla Bol	Guest	
2018	India's Next Superstars	Judge	
2018–present	Little Singham	Producer	
2019–present	Golmaal Jr.	Producer	
2019	Bigg Boss 13	Guest	
2021	Dance Deewane 3	Guest	
2021	Bigg Boss 15	Guest	
2022	Hunarbaaz: Desh Ki Shaan	Guest	
2022	India's Got Talent (season 9)	Guest	
2024	Bigg Boss 17	Guest	
2024	Indian Police Force	Director and producer	
2024	Bigg Boss 18	Host for the 5th week	
2025	Bigg Boss 19	Host for the 12th week	
2026	Bigg Boss 20	Host for the 8th week	

=== Short films ===
Year	Title	Director	Producer	Notes
2016	Ranveer Ching Returns	✓	✓	
2022	Made In India	✓	✓	

== Awards and nominations ==
Filmfare Awards
Year	Category	Film	Result	Ref.
2014	Best Director	Chennai Express	Nominated	

Producers Guild Film Awards
Year	Category	Film	Result	Ref.
2014	Best Director	Chennai Express	Nominated	

BIG Star Entertainment Awards
Year	Category	Film	Result	Ref.
2013	Most Entertaining Director	Chennai Express	Nominated	

Bollywood Hungama Surfers' Choice Movie Awards
Year	Category	Film	Result	Ref.
2014	Best Director	Chennai Express	Nominated	

Nickelodeon Kids' Choice Awards India
Year	Category	Film	Result	Ref.
2013	Best Film	Chennai Express	Won	

Star Box Office India Awards
Year	Category	Film	Result	Ref.
2014	Mr Box Office India Blockbuster	Singham Returns	Won	

Zee Cine Awards
Year	Category	Film	Result	Ref.
2013	Power Club – Box Office Award	Bol Bachchan	Won	
2014	Best Action Film	Chennai Express	Nominated	
2014	Best Director	Chennai Express	Nominated	
2018	Best Director	Golmaal Again	Nominated	
2018	Best Film (Viewers' Choice Award)	Golmaal Again	Nominated	
2018	Best Film (Jury's Choice Award)	Golmaal Again	Won	

IIFA Awards
Year	Category	Film	Result	Ref.
2014	Best Director	Chennai Express	Nominated	
