= Senior inspector =

Police officer rank

Senior inspector, also senior police inspector or senior inspector of police or Police Captain, is a police rank. The rank or position varies in seniority depending on the organization that uses it.

== Bosnia ==
In Bosnia's Police of Republika Srpska, senior inspector is lower than an independent inspector but higher than a full inspector.

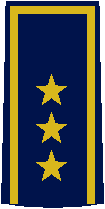
Republika Srpska

== Brunei ==
Royal Brunei Police Force use this rank, and it was lower than an assistant superintendent and higher than a full inspector.

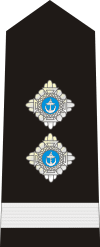
Brunei

== Bulgaria ==
In Bulgarian police, was higher than an inspector first grade while lower than a police

Bulgaria

== Estonia ==
The Estonian Police and Border Guard Board use this rank, it was below a chief inspector, but higher than a full inspector.

Estonia

== Germany ==
In Germany's Bundespolizei (Federal Police), it was lower than a chief inspector and higher than a full inspector.

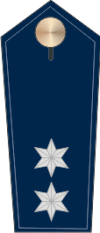
Germany

== Hong Kong ==
In Hong Kong, like in the Philippines, senior inspector is lower than a chief inspector, but higher than a full inspector.

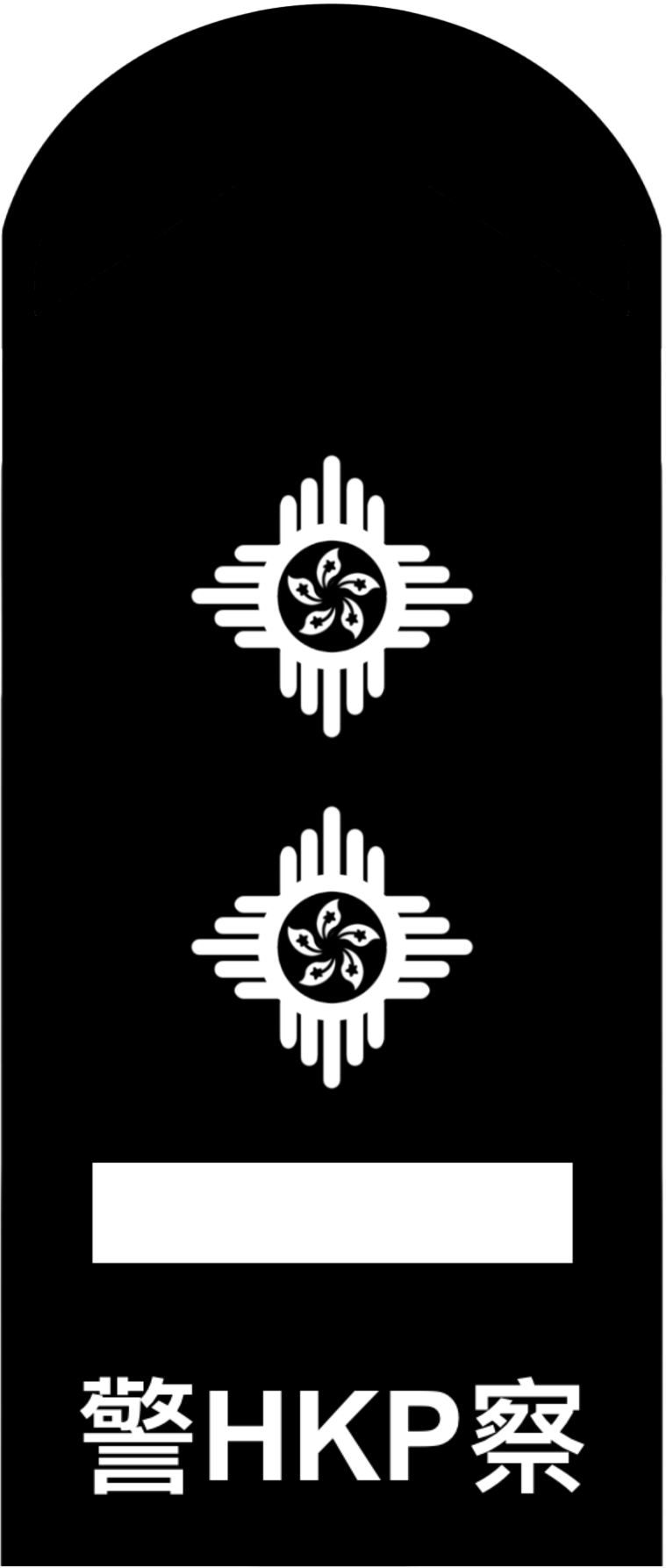
Hong Kong

== Lesotho ==
Lesotho Mounted Police Service's version of the rank, it was lower than an superintendent and higher than a full inspector.

Lesotho

== Lithuania ==
The senior inspector in Lithuanian police was lower than a commissioner inspector, and higher than a full inspector.

Lithuania

== North Macedonia ==
Senior inspector in North Macedonian Police was higher than an inspector but lower than an assistant chief inspector.

North Macedonia

== Philippines ==
The rank of Senior Inspector in the Philippine National Police was higher than an inspector, but lower than a chief inspector. The rank was replaced by the rank of Police Captain in 2019. However, the Bureau of Fire Protection and the Bureau of Jail Management and Penology still use it.

Philippines

== South Korea ==
In South Korean police, the Senior inspector rank was lower than a superintendent, and higher than a full inspector.

South Korea

== Vanuatu ==
The senior inspector in Vanuatu Police is lower than a chief inspector, but higher than a full inspector.

Vanuatu

== See also ==
- List of police ranks
