= List of accolades received by Chennai Express =

Chennai Express awards and nominations
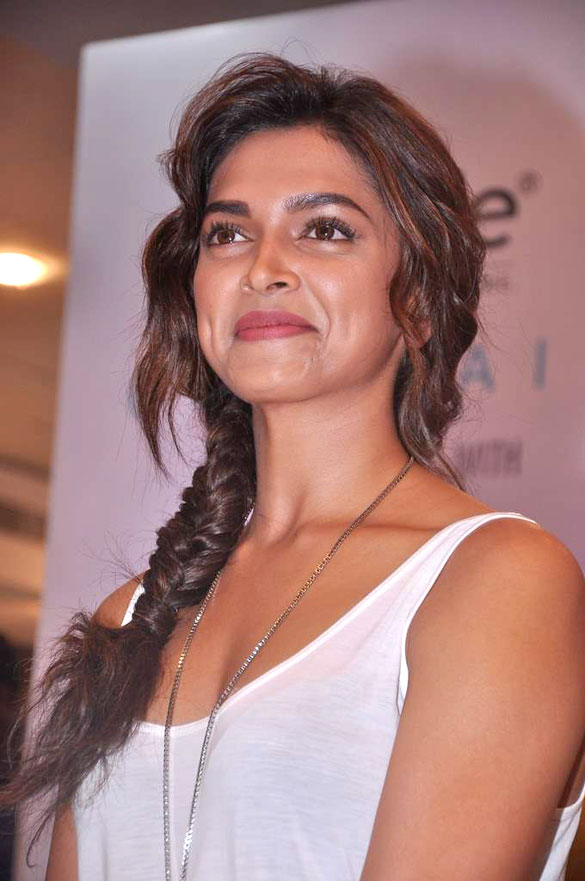
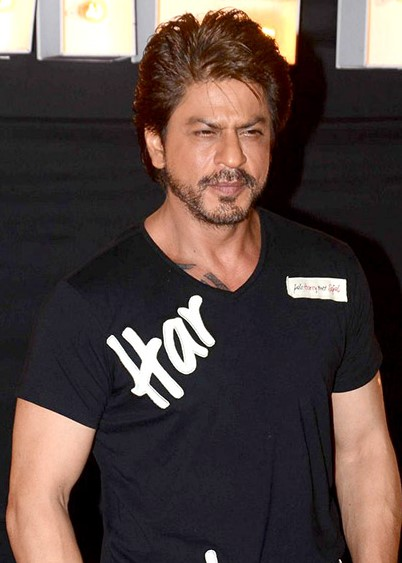
- Deepika Padukone and Shah Rukh Khan garnered several accolades for their performance in Chennai Express.
Awards and nominations
Award	Wins	Nominations

Totals (Note: Certain award groups do not simply award one winner. They acknowledge several different recipients, have runners-up, and have third place. Since this is a specific recognition and is different from losing an award, runner-up mentions are considered wins in this award tally. For simplification and to avoid errors, each award in this list has been presumed to have had a prior nomination.)
- Wins: 24
- Nominations: 64

Chennai Express is a 2013 Indian masala film directed by Rohit Shetty and produced by UTV Motion Pictures and Red Chillies Entertainment. It stars Deepika Padukone and Shah Rukh Khan with Nikitin Dheer, Sathyaraj, Kamini Kaushal and Lekh Tandon in supporting roles. The film revolves around Rahul Mithaiwala, a businessman who accidentally boards the eponymous train and journeys from Mumbai to Rameswaram with the daughter of an influential crimeboss.

The soundtrack for the film was composed by Vishal–Shekhar, with the background score being composed by Amar Mohile. UTV Motion Pictures came on board as producer and distributor, marking its first active project with Khan after Swades (2004). Chennai Express was released to positive reviews from critics and it broke several box office records in India and abroad, becoming the quickest film to collect ₹1 billion (US$17.07 million) net domestically.

At the 59th Filmfare Awards, Chennai Express received 7 nominations, including Best Director (Shetty), Best Actor (Khan) and Best Actress (Padukone). At the 15th IIFA Awards, it received 6 nominations and won 3 awards including Best Actress (Padukone).

== Awards and nominations ==
Award	Date of ceremony (Note: Date is linked to the article about the awards held that year, wherever possible.)	Category	Recipient(s)	Result	Ref(s)
BIG Star Entertainment Awards	18 December 2013	Most Entertaining Film of the Year	Chennai Express	Nominated	
BIG Star Entertainment Awards	18 December 2013	Most Entertaining Comedy Film	Chennai Express	Won	
BIG Star Entertainment Awards	18 December 2013	Most Entertaining Action Film	Chennai Express	Nominated	
BIG Star Entertainment Awards	18 December 2013	Most Entertaining Director	Rohit Shetty	Nominated	
BIG Star Entertainment Awards	18 December 2013	Most Entertaining Actor in an Action Film - Male	Shah Rukh Khan	Nominated	
BIG Star Entertainment Awards	18 December 2013	Most Entertaining Actor in a Comedy Film - Male	Shah Rukh Khan	Nominated	
BIG Star Entertainment Awards	18 December 2013	Most Entertaining Actor - Male	Shah Rukh Khan	Won	
BIG Star Entertainment Awards	18 December 2013	Most Entertaining Actor in a Comedy Film - Female	Deepika Padukone	Won	
BIG Star Entertainment Awards	18 December 2013	Most Entertaining Actor - Female	Deepika Padukone	Nominated	
BIG Star Entertainment Awards	18 December 2013	Most Entertaining Music	Vishal-Shekhar	Nominated	
BIG Star Entertainment Awards	18 December 2013	Most Entertaining Song	"Lungi Dance"	Nominated	
BIG Star Entertainment Awards	18 December 2013	Most Entertaining Singer - Male	Honey Singh for "Lungi Dance"	Nominated	
BIG Star Entertainment Awards	18 December 2013	Jodi Of The Year	Shah Rukh Khan & Deepika Padukone	Won	
ETC Bollywood Business Awards	2014	The 200 Crore Club	Chennai Express	Won	
ETC Bollywood Business Awards	2014	Best Marketed Film	Chennai Express	Won	
ETC Bollywood Business Awards	2014	Highest Grossing Actor - Female	Deepika Padukone (Note: Also for Yeh Jawaani Hai Deewani and Goliyon Ki Raasleela Ram-Leela.)	Won	
Filmfare Awards	24 January 2014	Best Film	Chennai Express	Nominated	
Filmfare Awards	24 January 2014	Sony Trendsetter of the Year	Chennai Express	Won	
Filmfare Awards	24 January 2014	Best Director	Rohit Shetty	Nominated	
Filmfare Awards	24 January 2014	Best Actor	Shah Rukh Khan	Nominated	
Filmfare Awards	24 January 2014	Best Actress	Deepika Padukone	Nominated	
Filmfare Awards	24 January 2014	Best Music Director	Vishal–Shekhar	Nominated	
Filmfare Awards	24 January 2014	Best Female Playback Singer	Chinmayi for "Titli"	Nominated	
International Indian Film Academy Awards	23 April 2014	Best Film	Chennai Express	Nominated	
International Indian Film Academy Awards	23 April 2014	Best Director	Rohit Shetty	Nominated	
International Indian Film Academy Awards	23 April 2014	Best Actor	Shah Rukh Khan	Nominated	
International Indian Film Academy Awards	23 April 2014	Best Actress	Deepika Padukone	Won	
International Indian Film Academy Awards	23 April 2014	Best Sound Recording	Vinod Verma for "Lungi Dance"	Won	
International Indian Film Academy Awards	23 April 2014	Best Sound Mixing	Anup Dev	Won	
Mirchi Music Awards	27 February 2014	Female Vocalist of The Year	Chinmayi for "Titli"	Won	
Mirchi Music Awards	27 February 2014	Song Recording/Sound Engineering of the Year	Shekhar Ravjiani for "Titli"	Won	
Producers Guild Film Awards	16 January 2014	Best Film	Chennai Express	Nominated	
Producers Guild Film Awards	16 January 2014	Best Director	Rohit Shetty	Nominated	
Producers Guild Film Awards	16 January 2014	Entertainer of the Year	Shah Rukh Khan	Won	
Producers Guild Film Awards	16 January 2014	Best Actress in a Leading Role	Deepika Padukone	Won	
Producers Guild Film Awards	16 January 2014	Best Music Director	Vishal–Shekhar	Nominated	
Producers Guild Film Awards	16 January 2014	Best Dialogues	Sajid-Farhad	Nominated	
Producers Guild Film Awards	16 January 2014	Best Choreography	Chinni Prakash for "Lungi Dance" & "Kashmir Main Tu Kanyakumari"	Nominated	
Producers Guild Film Awards	16 January 2014	Hall of Fame	Chennai Express	Won	
Screen Awards	14 January 2014	Best Actor	Shah Rukh Khan	Nominated	
Screen Awards	14 January 2014	Best Actor (Popular Choice)	Shah Rukh Khan	Won	
Screen Awards	14 January 2014	Best Actress (Note: Also for Goliyon Ki Raasleela Ram-Leela.)	Deepika Padukone	Won	
Screen Awards	14 January 2014	Best Actress (Popular Choice)	Deepika Padukone	Won	
Screen Awards	14 January 2014	Best Female Playback	Chinmayi for "Titli"	Nominated	
Screen Awards	14 January 2014	Best Dialogue	Sajid-Farhad	Nominated	
Screen Awards	14 January 2014	Best Marketed Film	Chennai Express	Won	
Zee Cine Awards	8 February 2014	Best Film	Chennai Express	Won	
Zee Cine Awards	8 February 2014	Best Director	Rohit Shetty	Nominated	
Zee Cine Awards	8 February 2014	Best Screenplay	Yunus Saijawal, Robin Bhatt	Nominated	
Zee Cine Awards	8 February 2014	Best Dialogues	Sajid-Farhad	Nominated	
Zee Cine Awards	8 February 2014	Best Actor – Male	Shah Rukh Khan	Won	
Zee Cine Awards	8 February 2014	Best Actor – Female	Deepika Padukone	Won	
Zee Cine Awards	8 February 2014	Best Actor in a Negative Role	Nikitin Dheer	Nominated	
Zee Cine Awards	8 February 2014	Song of the Year	"Lungi Dance"	Nominated	
Zee Cine Awards	8 February 2014	Song of the Year	"1 2 3 4 Get on the Dance Floor"	Nominated	
Zee Cine Awards	8 February 2014	Best Music Director	Vishal-Shekhar	Nominated	
Zee Cine Awards	8 February 2014	Best Background Music	Vishal-Shekhar	Nominated	
Zee Cine Awards	8 February 2014	Best Male Playback Singer	Amitabh Bhattacharya for "Tera Rastaa Chhodoon Na"	Nominated	
Zee Cine Awards	8 February 2014	Best Male Playback Singer	Honey Singh for "Lungi Dance"	Nominated	
Zee Cine Awards	8 February 2014	Best Female Playback Singer	Chinmayi for "Titli"	Nominated	
Zee Cine Awards	8 February 2014	Best Action	Rohit Shetty, Jai Singh Nijjar	Nominated	
Zee Cine Awards	8 February 2014	Best Cinematography	Dudley	Nominated	
Zee Cine Awards	8 February 2014	Best Choreography	Raju Sundaram for "1 2 3 4 Get on the Dance Floor"	Nominated	
Zee Cine Awards	8 February 2014	Best Marketed Film	Chennai Express	Won	
