= Chennai Express (soundtrack) =

2013 film score by various artists

- Soundtrack Album Cover

Soundtrack album by Vishal–Shekhar, Yo Yo Honey Singh
- Released: 13 June 2013
- Recorded: 2012–2013
- Genre: Feature film soundtrack
- Length: 39:34
- Language: Hindi
- Label: T-Series
- Producer: Vishal–Shekhar

Vishal–Shekhar, Yo Yo Honey Singh chronology
Gippi (2013)	Chennai Express (2013)	Gori Tere Pyaar Mein (2013)

Singles from Chennai Express
- 1. "Lungi Dance" Released: 13 July 2013

Chennai Express (/tʃɪˈnaɪ/) is the soundtrack album composed by the duo Vishal–Shekhar for the 2013 Indian masala film of the same name, directed by Rohit Shetty and written by Sajid-Farhad and Yunus Sajawal, starring Deepika Padukone and Shah Rukh Khan along with Nikitin Dheer and Sathyaraj in supporting roles. The background score for the film is composed by Amar Mohile. The soundtrack album features nine songs, written by Amitabh Bhattacharya, and the song ''Lungi Dance" which was written and performed by Yo Yo Honey Singh as a tribute to the Indian movie superstar Rajinikanth.

The album was released by T-Series on 1 July 2013.

== Marketing ==
The score of Chennai Express was composed by Amar Mohile; the songs were composed by the duo Vishal–Shekhar, and the lyrics were written by Amitabh Bhattacharya and Yo Yo Honey Singh. Recording of the songs began in late October 2012. The track "Ready Steady Po" was recorded in November 2012 by the music's composers and Smokey the Ghost/Smokey, along with Enkore, Brodha V and others. Several sources said that the director and actor were unsatisfied with the score. The director was reportedly asked to plan for a different musical composition. However, the composers denied these rumours. In mid-April 2013, singer S. P. Balasubrahmanyam recorded the title track for the film, marking his return to Bollywood for playback after an absence of fifteen years. He said the song celebrated the spirit of togetherness. Initially, Balasubrahmanyam was apprehensive, but chose to sing due to the content and leads of the film. The song "1 2 3 4 get on the dance floor" was released as a promotional single on World Music Day. On 27 June 2013, the video promo of the song "Titli" was released, and on 11 July 2013, the promo video of "Kashmir Main Tu Kanyakumari" was released. On 19 July 2013, T-Series uploaded a song to its official channel on YouTube; sung by Honey Singh. The song was titled "Lungi Dance – The 'Thalaivar(r)' Tribute" in honour of the film actor Rajinikanth. On 25 July 2013, a promotional video of the song "Tera Rasta Main Chhodoon Na" was released. The music album was launched on 1 July 2013.

== Track listing ==
All lyrics are written by Amitabh Bhattacharya; Yo Yo Honey Singh for "Lungi Dance" and additional Tamil Lyrics for "1 2 3 4 Get On The Dance Floor" and "Titli" by Niranjan Iyengar.

No.	Title	Music	Singer(s)	Length
1.	"1 2 3 4 Get on the Dance Floor"	Vishal-Shekhar	Vishal Dadlani, Hamsika Iyer, Sricharan	3:48
2.	"Titli"	Vishal-Shekhar	Gopi Sunder, Chinmayi, Charulatha Mani, Srimathumitha	5:50
3.	"Tera Rastaa Chhodoon Na"	Vishal-Shekhar	Anusha Mani, Amitabh Bhattacharya	4:13
4.	"Kashmir Main Tu Kanyakumari"	Vishal-Shekhar	Sunidhi Chauhan, Arijit Singh, Neeti Mohan	5:07
5.	"Ready Steady Po"	Vishal-Shekhar	Vishal Dadlani, Brodha V, Smokey the Ghost, Enkore, Natalie Di Luccio	3:28
6.	"Chennai Express" (Title Track)	Vishal-Shekhar	S. P. Balasubrahmanyam, Jonita Gandhi	4:47
7.	"Titli" (Dubstep Version)	Vishal-Shekhar	Zoheb Khan, Phoenyx	3:40
8.	"Chennai Express" (Mashup)	Vishal-Shekhar	DJ Kiran Kamath	3:37
9.	"Lungi Dance"	Yo Yo Honey Singh	Yo Yo Honey Singh	4:36
Total length:				39:34

== Critical response ==
Professional ratings
Review scores
Source	Rating
Devesh Sharma (Filmfare)	4/5 stars
IBN Live	3.5/5 stars
Yashika Mathur (Daily News and Analysis)	3.5/5 stars
Joginder Tuteja (Rediff)	3/5 stars

The soundtrack album of Chennai Express received positive reviews. Devesh Sharma of Filmfare gave the album 4/5, saying that it is "a robust offering, which is full of new sounds and zany surprises", and that Vishal–Shekhar put in a lot of effort to bring out their best for the film. IBN Live gave the album 3.5/5 and stated that the album was another "winner" from Vishal–Shekhar. The composers were critically praised for blending different forms of music which "pepped" the otherwise usual Bollywood music.

Yashika Mathur of DNA gave the album 3.5/5 and said that Chennai Express is "another winner from Vishal-Shekhar" that "boasts of a soothing bouquet of typical Bollywood numbers and some peppy tracks with exceptional mixing." She wrote that it "is likely to appeal to music lovers of all age-groups and sentiments" and called it "[a]n entertaining all-rounder, the composers must be applauded for fusing different music and beats to pep up the otherwise usual Bollywood music."

Joginder Tuteja of Rediff.com gave the album 3/5 and wrote that the title song, "Chennai Express", is "just about average". He expressed his displeasure over Balasubramaniam's ill-suiting of voice for Shah Rukh Khan, and said that in all the song was not remarkable. He, however, complimented that the overall outcome was "satisfactory" with a few of the songs even standing out. Anand Holla of Mumbai Mirror said, "It's easy to imagine director Rohit Shetty's crystal clear brief to Vishal-Shekhar, involving words such as catchy, peppy, fun, and of course 'hit songs'. Given how happily formulaic the soundtrack has turned out, V–S have given us a fair idea of what awaits us this Eid."
