= Sardool Sikander =

Indian singer (1961–2021)

Background information
- Born: 15 January 1961; Kheri Naudh Singh, Fatehgarh Sahib, Punjab, India
- Died: 24 February 2021 (aged 60) Chandigarh, India
- Years active: 1987–2021
- Spouse: Amar Noorie

Sardool Sikander (15 January 1961 – 24 February 2021) was an Indian singer associated with Punjabi-language folk and pop music, who made his first appearances on radio and television in the early 1980s with his introductory album, "Roadways Di Laari". He also acted in some Punjabi language films, like Jagga Daku. Sardool's father, the late Sagar Mastana, was a famous tabla player who invented a special type of tabla that was played with a thin bamboo stick. Sardool was married to Amar Noorie, a well-known singer and actress herself.

Born in the Kheri Naudh Singh in district Fatehgarh Sahib, he had his training in music from Prof. B S Narang. He belonged to the Patiala Gharana school of music. Sardool had 27 albums to his credit. His work has been included in over 50 derivative albums from all over the world. His album 'Husna De Malko' released in 1991 sold 5.1 million copies worldwide.

== Death ==
Sikander was undergoing treatment for various medical issues including kidney damage, uncontrolled diabetes, and multi-organ failure. He died from COVID-19 during the COVID-19 pandemic in India on 24 February 2021, at the age of 60 at Fortis Hospital Mohali in Chandigarh with his wife and two sons beside Amar Noorie.

== Discography ==
- 2016 'Last Time VS Last Night' (MovieBox/Japas Music)
- 2014 'Moons In The Sky' (MovieBox/T-Series)
- 2012 'Entrance' (Moviebox/Music Waves/Speed Records)
- 2010 'Kudi Mera Dil Di Hoya Ne Sohniye' (MovieBox/Planet Recordz/Speed Records)
- 2009 'Ik Tu Hove Main Hovan' (Speed Records)
- 2006 'Ous Kudi Ne' (Finetouch/Peritone)
- 2002 'Haiya Ho' (T-Series)
- 2001 'O Ho!' (T-Series)
- 2001 'Hits of Sardool: Noori Vol. 1' (Royal)
- 2000 'Sardool on A Dance Tip' (DMC)
- 1999 'Nakhra Janab Da' (Saaga)
- 1996 'Zara Has ke Vikha' (T-Series)
- 1996 'Gal Sun' (Soni Music)
- 1994 'Ik Kuri Dil Mangdi' (T-Series)
- 1993 'Gidhe Vich Nachna' (Asian Music Company)
- 1993 'Dance With...Sardool Sikander'
- 1993 'Jug Jug Jiyun Bhabian' (Saaga)
- 1992 'Nachna Sakht Mana Hai' (T-Series)
- 1992 'Munde Patte Gaye'
- 1991 'Sorry Wrong Number' (Music Bank)
- 1991 'Doli Meri Mashooq Di' (Saaga)
- 1991 'Roadways Di Laari'
- 1990 'London Vich Beh Gai' (VIP Record Producers)
- 1990 'Yaari Pardesiyan Di' (Music Bank/Smitsun Distributors Ltd.)
- 1990 'Zara Has Ke Vikha' (Saaga)
- 1989-90 'Husna De Malko' (Music Bank)
- 1989 'Aaja Sohniye' (Sureela Music)
- 1989 'Gora Rang Deyin Na Rabba' (T-Series)
- 1989 'Reelan De Dukan' (HMV)
- 1989 'Gidha Beat: Bhabiye Gidhe de Wich Nach Lae' (Sonotone)

== Singles ==
- 2012: Red Alert (Music By: Jassi Jalandhari & Label: MovieBox)
- 2014: Shareek (Music By: Muzical Doctorz & Label: MovieBox)
- 2014: Mera Valeti (Music By: Muzical Doctorz & Label: MovieBox)
- 2015: Paranda (Music By: Paul Nagra)
- 2016: Kangna (Music By: Kuwar Vrk / Feat: Craig Pans & Label: MovieBox/Japas Music)
- 2021: Maula (Music By: The PropheC)

== Duo collaboration ==
- 2021 'Maula' The PropheC ft Sardool Sikander
- 2014 'International Villager 2' (Music By: Honey Singh) Yaadan (MovieBox/Planet Recordz/T-Series)
- 2014 'Nanak Naam Chardi Kalah' (Music By Popsy) Ik Onkar (MovieBox)
- 2011 'Mere Dil Teh' (With GV) The Song Raab (Moviebox/Music Waves/Envy)
- 2011 'International Villager' (with Honey Singh) The Song Yadaan (MovieBox/Planet Recordz/Speed Records)
- 2011 'Close To Us' (Without Popsy) The Song Husn Jawani (Kamlee Records)
- 2010 'Shadaiya' with Amar Noorie (MovieBox)
- 2009 'Ik Tu Hove Ik Main Hovan' with Amar Noorie (Peritone/Kamlee Records)

== Religious ==
- 2011 'Charadi Khalla Tenu Samne Tu Hase' (StarMakers) Duo Collaboration With Harjit Harman
- 2010 ' Barse Channel Divya Theme Song '
- 2009 'Mayee Ne Kunda Kholeya' (Saaga)
- 2006 'Bole So Nihaal' (Saaga) Duo Collaboration with Hans Raj Hans
- 2004 'Darsh Maiya Da Keeta' (T-Series)
- 2002 'Panth Khalsa' (T-Series) Re-Released
- 1999 'Khalsa Dee Chardi Kala' (HMV)
- 1992 'Panth Sajaya Hai' (T-Series)
- 1991 'Seesa Dee Wanjare' (Sargam)
- 2013 'Maa Raniye Amrit Se Meetha Tera Naam' (T-Series)

== Filmography ==
- 2014 Police in Pollywood (Actor)
- 2010 Akh Labdi (T-Series)
- 2005 Baghi (Playback Singer)
- 2003 The Hero: Love Story of a Spy (Playback Singer)
- 2002 Pyaasa (Playback Singer)
- 1996 Panchayat (Noorie's Husband)
- 1996 Ishq Nachavye Gali Gali (Playback Singer)
- 1991 Dushmani Jattan Di (Playback Singer)
- 1991 Jagga Daku (Police Inspector)
- 1991 Visakhi (Driver)
