= International Villager =

- Official album cover

Studio album by Yo Yo Honey Singh
- Released: 11 November 2011
- Recorded: 2009–11
- Genres: pop, pop rap, bhangra, R&B
- Length: 55:42
- Languages: Punjabi, Hindi, English
- Labels: Speed Records; Times Music

Yo Yo Honey Singh chronology
International Villager (2011)	Desi Kalakaar (2014)

Singles from Studio
- 1. "Dope Shope" Released: 10 November 2011; 2. "Gabru" Released: 11 December 2011; 3. "Angreji Beat" Released: 29 December 2011; 4. "Goliyan" Released: 25 January 2012; 5. "Brown Rang" Released: 28 February 2012; 6. "Get Up Jawani" Released: 30 April 2012

International Villager is the debut studio album by Yo Yo Honey Singh. The album, containing 14 tracks, was officially released on 11 November 2011. It was one of the first Indian hip-hop albums to reach commercial and mainstream success.

== Production ==
From 2009-10 onwards, while producing music for several Punjabi artists, Singh simultaneously began working on his own debut studio album. Having been an award-winning music producer in Punjab for 3 consecutive years, Singh wanted to create an album that reflected his own vision and taste. In an interview with Radio City, Yo Yo Honey Singh stated that the song "Brown Rang" was originally written for Punjabi singer Diljit Dosanjh. He claimed to have co-written the song and produced its beats with Dosanjh in 2010, offering him the opportunity to sing the track. Diljit declined, stating that the track contained parts of English and was too futuristic for him. Singh then took it to Jassi Sidhu, who sang it at a higher scale than what Singh had envisioned. Ultimately, Singh performed it himself.

In December 2024, Speed Records released the original music video for the track "Angreji Beat" from the album, which Gippy Grewal and Singh had previously shelved due to the music video's allegedly transgressive nature. Instead, the two chose to release a low-budget music video depicting a Fake Singh and Gippy Grewal being called to perform at a wedding function.

== Track listing ==
No.	Title	Writer(s)	Length
1.	"Brown Rang"	Yo Yo Honey Singh	3:31
2.	"Angreji Beat ft. Gippy Grewal"	Veet Baljit, Yo Yo Honey Singh	4:16
3.	"Goliyan ft. Diljit Dosanjh"	Pirti Silon, Yo Yo Honey Singh	3:37
4.	"Dope Shope ft. Deep Money"	Yo Yo Honey Singh, Deep Money	3:13
5.	"Gabhru ft. J Star"	Kinder Deol	3:38
6.	"Aashke"	Money Aujla	3:35
7.	"Beautiful ft. Malkit Singh"	Honey Singh	5:36
8.	"Yadaan"	Sardool Sikander, Yo Yo Honey Singh	3:59
9.	"Garaari"	Meet Malkit	3:54
10.	"Sambhle"	Manak Ali	3:40
11.	"Head Banger ft. Escape"	Yo Yo Honey Singh	4:52
12.	"Yaad"	Romey Gill	4:46
13.	"Get Up Jawani ft. Shah"	John , Yo Yo Honey Singh	3:48
14.	"Mujh Ko Jaane Do"	Raj Brar	3:12
Total length:			55:42

== Reception ==
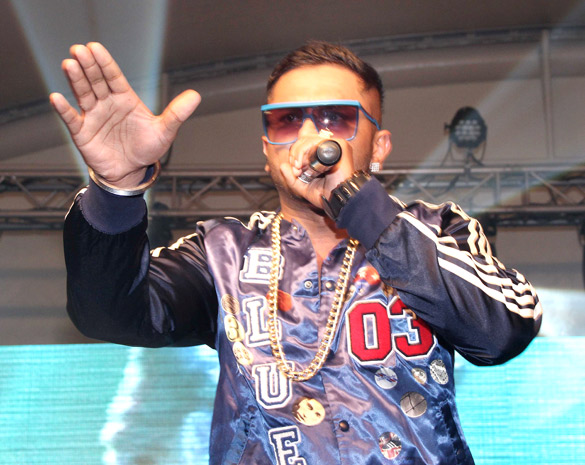
Yo Yo Honey Singh at a concert in 2012

The album catapulted Singh to superstardom. Its hit track, "Angreji Beat," became an anthem for party-goers across India and beyond. Honey Singh soon became a household name, with his songs dominating the charts, whether in Bollywood films or independent releases. Tracks like "Brown Rang," "Dope Shope," and "Desi Kalakaar" showcased his versatility as an artist, blending different musical styles and languages to create music that was uniquely his own.

International Villager became one of the highest-grossing Punjabi albums of all time in 2015. One of the album's tracks, "Gabru", featuring J-Star, quickly climbed to the top of the Asian music charts, including the official BBC Asian charts.

The music video for the track "Brown Rang" was released on 28 February 2012 and became YouTube's top trending video of 2012. It won the top spot on the list of YouTube's most-watched videos of 2012 in India with over 10 million views. The song has received over 600 million views on YouTube.

The track "Angreji Beat" from the album was featured in Saif Ali Khan's 2012 Bollywood film Cocktail.

By 2012, Singh had set a record for the highest fee ever paid to an artist for a Bollywood song, reportedly receiving ₹7 million rupees (US$84,000) for tracks in the movies Cocktail and Mastaan. However, as the film Mastaan got shelved, he eventually sang his first Hindi song in Cocktail.

== Awards ==
- The track "Brown Rang" received the MTV VMAI award and was awarded the Best Video Song of 2012.
- The album won Best International Album at the 2012 UK Asian Music Awards.

== Controversies ==
In an interview with Raaj Jones of OYE! 104.8 FM on 16 June 2015, Badshah discussed the work he had done with Honey Singh, including the song "Brown Rang." He stated that he and Honey Singh co-wrote the track together. However, in recent years, Badshah has gone back on this claim and has instead stated to have written the entire track and also accused Singh of not giving him proper credit for the track in several podcasts and interviews. Badshah also allegedly left Mafia Mundeer a few months after the release of the album, claiming that Singh was only focusing on his own career.

Singh has denied these claims, reiterating that the song "Brown Rang" was originally written for Punjabi singer Diljit Dosanjh and co-written with Dosanjh in 2010, while its entire music was produced by Singh himself. Singh also clarified in an interview with The Lallantop that Badshah was never a part of Mafia Mundeer, as he was "not a talent discovered from the streets, and was instead just a client for him".

Former member of Mafia Mundeer and fellow rapper, Raftaar, split from Mafia Mundeer due to credit-related issues, most notably for the track "Dope Shope" from Singh's album, which Raftaar claims to have written the rap segment. He also appeared in the music video for a few seconds and alleged that his scenes were cut.
