= Anuj Sachdeva =

Indian actor and model

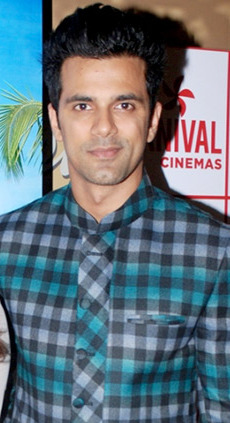
- Sachdeva in 2016
- Born: 5 October 1986 (age 39); New Delhi, India
- Occupations: Actor; model
- Years active: 2005–present
- Notable work: Hawaa Hawaai; Love Shagun

Anuj Sachdeva (born 5 October 1986) is an Indian actor and model. Sachdeva has worked in fims, television commercials and TV shows. He participated in the reality show MTV Roadies in 2005. Sachdeva is known for his role of Amrit in Sabki Laadli Bebo. He was seen portraying the role of Sahil Sengupta in Colors popular show Swaragini - Jodein Rishton Ke Sur.

He has acted in films such as Hawaa Hawaai; a romantic comedy, Love Shagun and two Punjabi films; Haani and Police in Pollywood.

== Personal life ==
Anuj Sachdeva was born in New Delhi. Before his acting career took off, Sachdeva was working with his father in his business of manufacturing shoes. He is a qualified shoe designer as well. He began his modeling and acting career on his father's insistence.

Sachdeva has also done a course in method acting from Lee Strasberg Theatre and Film Institute.

== Career ==
Sachdeva appeared on Season 3 of the reality show MTV Roadies. After Roadies, he formally began his acting career with a cameo in a 2007 Hindi film Delhii Heights.

He enrolled himself for the Grasim Mr. India pageant. Sachdeva was bestowed with trophies of Mr. Photogenic and Best Talent. His modelling career took off from here on and he appeared in many commercials.

Sachdeva debuted on television with Star Plus' Sabki Laadli Bebo. He later appeared in Zee TV's Phir Subah Hogi where he played the role of Thakur Aditya Singh, the male protagonist with a feisty attitude. Sachdeva quit the show later that year expressing dislike for the script. He then moved to New York for a few months to pursue a course in Method Acting at Lee Strasberg Theatre & Film Institute. Sachdeva joined Sony TV's Chhanchhan in 2013 as a replacement for Farhan Khan. Sachdeva was signed on by Rajan Shahi as the male protagonist of his show Itti Si Khushi on Sony TV. He was then seen as Sahil Sengupta in Rashmi Sharma Telefilms Limited Swaragini - Jodein Rishton Ke Sur on Colors TV.

Sachdeva appeared at Kaun Banega Crorepati alongside his Itti Si Khushi co-star Smriti Kalra.

In 2019, Sachdeva took part in dance reality show Nach Baliye on Star Plus along with Urvashi Dholakia.

It was reported that, he was about to play a cameo role in Jai Hanuman - Sankat Mochan Naam Tiharo, but later on declined it.

== Television ==
Year	Title	Role	Notes
2005–2006	MTV Roadies 3	Contestant	
2009–2011	Sabki Laadli Bebo	Amrit Malhotra	
2009	Yeh Rishta Kya Kehlata Hai	Amrit Malhotra	Guest
2009	Kayamath	Amrit Malhotra	Guest
2009	Tujh Sang Preet Lagai Sajna	Amrit Malhotra	Guest
2009	Kis Desh Mein Hai Meraa Dil	Amrit Malhotra	Guest
2010	Sajan Ghar Jaana Hai	Amrit Malhotra	Guest
2010	Sapna Babul Ka... Bidaai	Amrit Malhotra	Guest
2010	Sasural Genda Phool	Amrit Malhotra	Guest
2011	Saath Nibhaana Saathiya	Amrit Malhotra	Guest
2011	Mann Kee Awaaz Pratigya	Amrit Malhotra	Guest
2012	Phir Subah Hogi	Thakur Aditya Singh	
2013	Chhanchhan	Manav Borisagar	
2014–2015	Itti Si Khushi	Aman Goel	
2016	Box Cricket League 2	Contestant	
2016	Swaragini – Jodein Rishton Ke Sur	Sahil Sengupta	
2017	Entertainment Ki Raat	Himself	Guest
2018	Laal Ishq	Bijua/Nikhil	Episode 22/39
2019	Ek Bhram Sarvagun Sampanna	Vyom Malhotra	
2019	Nach Baliye 9	Contestant	8th place
2022	Woh Toh Hai Albelaa	Chiranjeev "Cheeru" Chaudhary	
2023–2024	Dhruv Tara – Samay Sadi Se Pare	Maan Singh	

=== Films ===
- 2007 Delhii Heights
- 2013 Haani as Harman
- 2014 Hawaa Hawaai as Bugs
- 2014 Police in Pollywood
- 2016 Love Shagun as Jyotiraditya Suryakant Dubey/JD

=== Web series ===
- Breathe as Sameer
- Bin Bulaye Mehmaan
- The Reunion as Dev
- Chhal Kapat as Vikram
