= An Open Letter to Honey Singh =

Rap video by Rene Sharanya Verma

An Open Letter to Yo Yo Honey Singh is a 3.5-minute rap video featuring Rene Sharanya Verma, a student of St. Stephen's College, Delhi, performing at Café Zingo Star in Greater Kailash-II organised by Delhi Poetry Slam, an initiative that aims to "restore the art of spoken word into the everyday culture of the Capital". She performed before a 30-person audience. The subject of the slam was "Portrait of a Lady". The rap number was composed in one hour at the cafe. The video has been uploaded to YouTube using the handle "Delhi Poetry Slam". The addressee referred to in the title is Indian musician Yo Yo Honey Singh. Besides challenging Singh, the video criticizes extant value systems in the media, advertising and the arts that demean women and treat women as commodities, instead of persons.

== Context ==
Honey Singh is an Indian rapper whose work has been perceived to be vulgar, misogynist, promoting violence against women and a bad influence on youth. There have been reactions in prose to Singh, such as from Annie Zaidi, who wrote her own "An Open Letter to Honey Singh" in January 2013, and Sandipan Sharma, who wrote "Thanks for the crassness: An open letter to Honey Singh from a parent" in July 2014.

== Reception ==
In part, the work is a response to the perceived misogyny in Singh's work. Verma said in an interview that on initially hearing Singh's "Blue Eyes" it "hooked" her, but that when she "paid attention to the lyrics" she realized they were "very problematic". Femina said that Verma uses phrases in Singh's works to express her disgust, and appreciates that the message Verma wishes to convey that every woman is intrinsically good the way she is. The target is not only Singh but also eve teasers, who were the template for works such as Singh's. Although there have been other protests against Singh's work, including petitions and an open letter written by Annie Zaidi in The Sunday Guardian, Verma's rap number uses the same artistic format as Singh and incorporates some of his own lyrics. Verma's work has been considered as an example of Indian women confronting adversities. Verma's work has been cited as an example of a spoken word performance being used as a revolutionary tool, and as parodying Singh while attacking the sexism in Singh's rap. Subsequently the video of another work of hers received over 180,000 hits on YouTube and was the subject of media attention, in which she was described as someone who had confronted Singh, and "slamming" and "knocking the wind out of" him. She was featured on The Arts Hour for the BBC World Service presented by Nikki Bedi, with her rap number "Reclaim the night".

== Social media ==
The video was uploaded to YouTube on 28 January 2015. It went viral on social media and had received about a million hits on YouTube by 2 February 2015. As of August 10, 2015, the video had received over 1.6 million hits.
