= Glory (Yo Yo Honey Singh album) =

2024 album by Yo Yo Honey Singh

GLORY
- Official album cover

Studio album by Yo Yo Honey Singh
- Released: 26 August 2024
- Recorded: 2024
- Genres: Pop, pop rap, hip-hop, Folk music
- Length: 56:26
- Languages: Punjabi, Hindi, English
- Label: T-Series
- Producer: Yo Yo Honey Singh

Yo Yo Honey Singh chronology
Honey 3.0 (2024)	GLORY (2024)	51 Glorious Days (2025)

Singles from GLORY
- 1. "Millionaire" Released: 26 August 2024; 2. "Bonita" Released: 8 September 2024; 3. "High On Me" Released: 26 September 2024; 4. "Jatt Mehkma" Released: 8 November 2024; 5. "Payal" Released: 18 November 2024; 6. "Sheeshe Wali Chunni" Released: 12 January 2025; 7. "Maniac (Bonus Track)" Released: 22 February 2025; 8. "Teri Yaadein (Bonus Track)" Released: 26 May 2025

Glory (stylized as GLORY) is the fourth studio album by Indian rapper Yo Yo Honey Singh. It was released on 26th August 2024, through T-Series. The tracks were written by multiple artists including Leo Grewal, Talwiinder, Jamila El Badaoui, Paradox, Bonafide and others. The release of the album coincided with the 10th anniversary of his sophomore studio album Desi Kalakaar.

== Reception ==
The album was said to be a part of Singh's "comeback" to music. The track "Millionaire" trended at #1 on YouTube. Critics noted the presence of singers from various countries such as Morocco, the Dominican Republic and Pakistan. After the success of the album, Singh announced his Millionaire India Tour that began in February 2025.

== Track Listing ==
No.	Title	Length
1.	"Millionaire"	3:19
2.	"Jatt Mehkma"	3:15
3.	"High on Me" (with Talwiinder)	2:55
4.	"Fuck Them" (with Leo Grewal)	3:50
5.	"Bonita" (with The Shams)	2:58
6.	"Hide It"	3:04
7.	"Malamaal"	3:08
8.	"Rounds N Ring" (with Navaan Sandhu, Bonafide)	2:55
9.	"Lapata" (with pho)	3:11
10.	"Payal" (with Paradox)	3:46
11.	"Caliente"	3:15
12.	"6 AM"	2:55
13.	"Majnooh" (with Jamila El Badaoui)	3:10
14.	"Sheeshe Wali Chunni" (with Girik Aman)	3:09
15.	"Shamaan De Vele" (with Leo Grewal)	2:51
16.	"Beeba" (with Laïoung, Wahab Bugti)	2:54
17.	"Chhori" (with Paradox)	2:28
18.	"Rap God" (feat. Handles Tdnb, Marvi‑Sahiban)	3:23
Total length:		56:26
