= Chhanchhan =

2013 Indian TV series

- Genre: Family drama Comedy; Romance
- Created by: Vipul D. Shah
- Written by: Vipul D. Shah; Sonali Jaffar; Kovid Gupta; Dheeraj Sarna
- Directed by: Uttam Ahlawat; K.K.Chauhan; Aziz Khan
- Creative directors: Mani Dixit; Tuba Burney
- Starring: See below
- Country of origin: India
- Original language: Hindi
- No. of seasons: 1
- No. of episodes: 103

Production
- Executive producers: Harishankar; Nisha Rawal
- Producers: Vipul D. Shah; Sanjiv Sharma
- Editor: Sameer Gandhi
- Camera setup: Multi-camera
- Running time: 20 minutes
- Production company: Optimystix Entertainment

Original release
- Network: Sony Entertainment Television
- Release: 25 March – 19 September 2013

Chhanchhan is an Indian family drama TV series which aired from 25 March 2013 through 19 September 2013 on Sony Entertainment Television. It stars Sanaya Irani, Supriya Pathak, and Anuj Sachdeva.

== Plot ==
Chhanchhan Sarabhai (Sanaya Irani) is a young woman with a modern outlook who lives in Ahmedabad with her family. During the wedding of her friend Poorvi, Chhanchhan meets Umaben, (Supriya Pathak) who needs money. Realizing this, they stop the marriage and Umaben starts to hate Chhanchhan. Chhanchhan meets Umaben's son Manav (Farhan Khan), and they also hate each other. Despite their mutual hatred, they develop a friendship and fall in love.

Chhanchhan's family is happy when they learn of the pair's relationship. When Umaben finds out her son is in love with↵Chhanchhan, she feigns illness and tells her family she will only recover if Manav marries a girl of her choice. Manav's friend Himanshu says he will arrange for Umaben and Chhanchhan to meet so Manav can marry Chhanchhan. They meet at an ashram where Chhanchhan works, and she finds out that Manav is Umaben's son.

When Manav hears that his mother would prefer a traditional daughter-in-law to Chhanchan, he plans to run away. Umaben tries to stop him but fails. That night, Umaben faints and is rushed to hospital. Manav visits her with Chhanchhan, who calls a doctor and tells him to save Umaben's life. Umaben recovers, finds out that Chhanchhan saved her life, and tells Manav she has accepted Chhanchhan while still hating her and planning to ruin the wedding. Manav tells Chhanchhan's family, who are happy that Chhanchhan's parents meet Umaben the next day.

Chhanchhan and Manav—now played by Anuj Sachdeva—marry happily. Umaben vows to make Chhanchhan leave the house within 30 days after her housewarming party; she unsuccessfully tries to create difficult domestic situations for Chhanchhan. In her sister Rushali's parlour, Chhanchhan meets a girl named Sonali; she and Chhanchhan are surprised to hear that Chhanchhan's husband's and Sonali's fiancé's names are the same. Chhanchhan is shocked to hear Sonali's fiancé's full name is Manav Borisagar. Chhanchhan realises that Umaben is trying to make Manav marry Sonali. Chhanchhan tells Manav about her discovery, and the next day, the pair meet Sonali and ask her fiancé's full name, which Sonali says is Manav Nagar.

Chhanchhan decides to investigate. She leaves Manav's house, goes to her parents' house and starts gathering evidence against Umaben and Sonali. She follows Sonali to a temple where she overhears Umaben, telling Sonali she will remove Chhanchhan in one month and make Manav marry Sonali. Chhanchhan records the conversation on her video camera and confronts Umaben about it. Umaben tells Chhanchhan she hates her because she interrupted Poorvi's marriage, accusing Umaben of forcing to give dowry. Umaben also says she fears Chhanchhan's modern thoughts will break the house. Chhnachhan promises to win Umaben's trust and never let her house break.

Kaumudi and Chhanchhan feel the family is drifting apart because of the competition among its members. Umaben leaves for a tirtha yatra. Manav gives Chhanchhan a Western dress and asks her to wear it for him. Chhanchhan refuses but later agrees. She is unable to wear the dress to a date with Manav, who gets angry and scolds her for this. Rupali, Manav's friend from college days, enters the scene and taunts Chhanchhan for not satisfying Manav's wishes. Chhanchhan tells Rupali she has no Indian values. Rupali leaves angrily, and later that night, he telephones Manav and asks him to meet her to discuss a contract she had to give. At their meeting, Rupali proposes to Manav, tells him she loves him and asks him to leave Chhanchhan for her. Manav scolds her and leaves. Rupali plans to avenge Manav.

The following day, a legal case, stating the family company, Borisagar Enterprises, supplied inferior quality materials, is filed. Manav fights with the claimant, Harish, in front of the police. The next day, while Manav and Chhanchhan are out on a drive, a bicycle rider wearing a helmet is knocked unconscious as she deliberately collides with Manav's car. The rider is revealed to be Harish, who is declared dead at the hospital. Manav is arrested, charged with Harish's murder and gaoled. Chhanchhan realises these events are what Rupali is doing and confronts her. The murder charge causes the Borisagar family to lose respect in society. Their business loses money and people insult the family. Umaben is removed as head of Mahila Sanstha, and people seeking Mansi's hand in marriage reject him.

The family realizes Harish is alive. Manav records proof of this on his phone and shows it to Rupali. The next day, Rupali hires goons to retrieve the phone. Manav tells Rupali that he gives up and wants her to clean his and his family's names. Chhanchhan calls the police, and Rupali is arrested. Having solved their problems, Manav and Chhanchhan live happily.

== Cast ==
- Sanaya Irani as Chhanchhan Sarabhai Borisagar
- Farhan Khan / Anuj Sachdeva as Manav Borisagar
- Supriya Pathak as Umaben Borisagar,
- Anang Desai as Matilalbhai Borisagar
- Arvind Vaidya as Manav's Grandfather
- Rajiv Kumar as Mokut Borisagar
- Rohini Banerjee as Kaumudi Borisagar
- Romanch Mehta as Manek Borisagar
- Jagrati Sethia as Sakshi Borisagar
- Deepti Dhyani as Ranjana Borisagar
- Jimit Trivedi as Manthan Borisagar
- Anushree Bathla as Sanjana Borisagar
- Vividha Kriti as Maansi Borisagar
- Deepak Pareek as Kartik Sarabhai
- Anjali Mukhi as Maithali Sarabhai
- Shraman Jain as Rugved Sarabhai
- Cheshta Mehta as Rushali Sarabhai
- Deeya Chopra as Poorvi
- Charu Asopa as Simple
- Dheeraj Miglani as Himanshu
- Tapeshwari Sharma as Sonali
- Shruti Bapna as Rupaali
- Vishal Solanki as Vineet

== Critical response ==
DNA stated that Chhanchhan has average cinematography, art direction, and costume design, making the show pleasing to the eye, while having to-the-point, realistic dialogues with a decent story pace.
