= Jabariya Jodi =

2019 Indian film by Prashant Singh

- Theatrical release poster
- Directed by: Prashant Singh
- Written by: Story: Sanjeev K Jha; Dialogues: Raaj Shaandilyaa
- Produced by: Ekta Kapoor; Shobha Kapoor; Shailesh R Singh
- Starring: Sidharth Malhotra; Parineeti Chopra
- Cinematography: Vishal Sinha
- Edited by: Ritesh Soni
- Music by: Songs: Tanishk Bagchi; Vishal Mishra; Sachet–Parampara; Ramji Gulati; Ashok Masti; Score: Joel Crasto
- Production companies: Balaji Motion Pictures; Karma Media & Entertainment; ALT Entertainment
- Distributed by: Zee Studios (International); Pen Marudhar Entertainment
- Release date: 9 August 2019
- Running time: 139 minutes
- Country: India
- Language: Hindi
- Budget: ₹29 crore
- Box office: ₹21.13 crore

Jabariya Jodi (transl. Forced couple) is an Indian Hindi-language romantic comedy film starring Sidharth Malhotra and Parineeti Chopra. The story is based upon the tradition of groom kidnapping, prevalent in Bihar. The film is produced by Ekta Kapoor, Shobha Kapoor and Shailesh R Singh, and directed by Prashant Singh. Principal photography began on 10 August 2018 in Lucknow, and the film was theatrically released in India on 9 August 2019.

== Plot ==
In the heart of Bihar, Abhay Singh is a feared enforcer of pakadwa vivaah, the local practice of abducting grooms and forcing them into marriage. He works under the influence of his powerful and manipulative father, Hukum Singh, who sees this as a way to deliver justice to dowry-seeking families.

Babli Yadav, a fierce and independent woman, returns to her hometown after being expelled from school for her rebellious behavior. Confident and outspoken, she does not conform to societal norms and enjoys living life on her own terms. She meets Abhay, and their reunion is filled with nostalgia, flirtation, and unresolved emotions, as they were once childhood sweethearts. Their attraction is evident, but their differing ideologies create conflict.

As Babli's parents pressure her into marriage, she initially plays along but soon decides to take control of her own fate. Meanwhile, Abhay struggles with his own emotions, torn between his father's expectations and his growing feelings for Babli. When Babli learns that Abhay himself is a victim of his father's manipulations—having been denied the freedom to love and choose for himself—she hatches an audacious plan.

Babli, in a twist on the tradition, kidnaps Abhay, declaring that if men can be forced into unwanted marriages, then she can do the same for the man she loves. This unexpected turn leads to comedic chaos as Abhay resists, but deep down, he starts realizing the hypocrisy of his actions. As they spend time together, Babli challenges Abhay to break free from the shackles of societal expectations.

Abhay's father, furious at Babli's bold move, retaliates by arranging Abhay's forced marriage to another woman. Pressured by loyalty and obligation, Abhay initially agrees, breaking Babli's heart. However, at the last moment, he rebels, standing up to his father and calling off the wedding. He rushes to Babli and, in a dramatic and heartfelt confession, declares his love for her.

Babli, initially hesitant after all the heartbreak, eventually gives in as Abhay proves that he is willing to change for love. The film ends with their wedding, but this time, it is on their own terms—no kidnappings, no force, just love. The town celebrates their union, marking the end of pakadwa vivaah and the beginning of a new chapter where love triumphs over outdated traditions.

== Cast ==
- Sidharth Malhotra as Abhay Bunty Singh
- Parineeti Chopra as Babli Yadav (Few lines as Mona Ghosh Shetty)
- Javed Jaffrey as Hukum Singh
- Sanjay Mishra as Duniya Lal Yadav
- Aparshakti Khurana as Santosh Pathak
- Elli AvrRam as Zilla
- Ruslaan Mumtaz as Kush
- Chandan Roy Sanyal as Guddu
- Neeraj Sood as Pathak ji
- Arfi Lamba as Jeetu
- Yogita Rathore as Abhay's sister
- Sheeba Chadda as Abhay's mother
- Mohit Baghel Replaced Mohit Daga as Halla
- Gopal Datt as Inspector Tiwari
- Aaryan Arora as Young Abhay
- Anupam Mishra as Photographer
- Sharad Kapoor as Daddan Yadav
- Alankrita Sahai in the item number "Macchardani"

== Production ==
=== Development ===
The film was conceived by writer Sanjeev K Jha who is from Bihar and is familiar with forced marriage practice in his native state. He was surprised to see the official data that said that more abductions happened in Bihar for the purpose of forced marriage than ransom in recent years. He said in a statement, "We always knew such forced marriages happen, but we didn't know the magnitude of it." It was an eye-opener for him so he created a comic world and a love-story using this bizarre practices.

=== Filming ===
Filming began on 10 August 2018 in Lucknow, Barabanki and Raebareli. The film wrapped shooting in mid April 2019.

== Release ==
The release date of the film was initially scheduled to be 17 May 2019 but the date had to be pushed back multiple times first to 12 July 2019 and then to 2 August 2019 and finally it released theatrically on 9 August 2019.

== Soundtrack ==
Jabariya Jodi 2

Soundtrack album by Tanishk Bagchi, Vishal Mishra, Sachet–Parampara, Ramji Gulati and Ashok Masti
- Released: 19 July 2019
- Recorded: 2018–2019
- Genre: Feature film soundtrack
- Length: 34:31
- Language: Hindi
- Label: Zee Music Company
External audio
- Official Audio Jukebox on YouTube

The music of the film is composed by Tanishk Bagchi, Vishal Mishra, Sachet–Parampara, Ramji Gulati and Ashok Masti while lyrics are written by Raj Shekhar, Rashmi Virag, Shabbir Ahmed, Kumaar, Tanishk Bagchi and Siddharth-Garima. Background music scored by Joel Crasto.

Track listing
No.	Title	Lyrics	Music	Singer(s)	Length
1.	"Khadke Glassy"	Tanishk Bagchi, Channi Rakhala	Tanishk Bagchi	Yo Yo Honey Singh, Ashok Masti, Jyotica Tangri	3:20
2.	"Zilla Hilela"	Shabbir Ahmed, Tanishk Bagchi	Tanishk Bagchi	Dev Negi, Monali Thakur, Raja Hassan, Pravesh Mallick	3:58
3.	"Dhoonde Akhiyaan"	Rashmi Virag	Tanishk Bagchi	Yasser Desai, Altamash Faridi	4:35
4.	"Khwabfaroshi"	Siddharth-Garima	Sachet–Parampara	Sachet Tandon, Parampara Thakur	4:47
5.	"Ki Honda Pyaar" (Male Version)	Raj Shekhar	Vishal Mishra	Arijit Singh	5:22
6.	"Macchardani"	Raj Shekhar	Vishal Mishra	Jyotica Tangri, Vishal Mishra	4:09
7.	"Ki Honda Pyaar" (Female Version)	Raj Shekhar	Vishal Mishra	Neha Kakkar, Vishal Mishra	5:22
8.	"Glassy 2.0 Remake"	Kumaar	Ramji Gulati, Ashok Masti	Yo Yo Honey Singh, Ashok Masti, Jyotica Tangri	2:58
Total length:					34:31

== Reception ==
Nandini Ramnath from Scroll.in rated the movie 1.5 stars on 5 and wrote, "Inexplicably convoluted and unforgivably long". Lakshana N Palat from India Today wrote, "Sidharth Malhotra and Parineeti Chopra film is excruciatingly painful" and rated the movie 1.5 out of 5 stars.

The Times of India's Ronak Kotecha rated the movie 2.5 stars on 5 and wrote, "Jabariya Jodi starts on a promising note, but loses steam along the way. It tries to throw light on serious issues with lighter moments, but gets tangled in a melodramatic and unrealistic narrative that doesn't feel all that jabardust." Shubhra Gupta of The Indian Express rated the film one on five stars calling it a confused long drawn mess.

=== Box office ===
Jabariya Jodi's opening day collection was ₹27.0 million and the second day collection was ₹37.0 million, whereas the third day collection went up to ₹45.0 million, making its total collection for opening weekend to ₹109.0 million.

As of 23 August 2019, with a gross of ₹19.21 crore in India and ₹1.92 crore overseas, the film has a worldwide gross collection of ₹21.13 crore.
