= Romey Gill =

- Born: Romey Singh Gill; 1979; Kokri Kalan, Moga, Punjab, India
- Died: 24 June 2009 (aged 30) Ludhiana, Punjab, India
- Genres: Punjabi folk
- Years active: 2000-2008

Romey Gill (born Romey Singh Gill) (1979 – 24 June 2009) was a Punjabi Indian singer. He had success with his songs Nahron Paar Bangla, Jeeto and Nakhra Chari Jawani Da.

== Discography ==
Year	Album	Record label	Info	Music
2006	Bhangra Renaissances	Music Waves	Tracks 14	
2005	Mitraan De Chaatri Ni	K2 Records	Tracks 8	
2004	Sun Nakhre Waliye	Ting Ling	Tracks 8	
2003	Jogan Hogaye Ve	T-Series	Tracks 8	Kiss N Tell
2002	Nakhra Chari Jawani Da	T-Series	Tracks 8	Onkar Singh; Meenakshi Jawanda
2001	Jeeto	Kismet Records; Moon Records	Tracks 8	Kiss N Tell
2000	Tere Gidde Ne		Tracks 10	

== Duo collaboration ==
Year	Album	Record label	Song	Music
2015	Birmingham Premier 2 with Dr. Zeus	MovieBox/Speed Records	Punjab Bolda Haan	Dr. Zeus
2011	International Villager with Honey Singh	Speed Records; MovieBox Records; Planet Recordz	Yaad	Honey Singh
2010	Extended Play with Tigerstyle		Dhol Vajda	Tigerstyle
2008	Groundshaker 2 with Aman Hayer	Genre Records; Speed Records; Planet Recordz	Puch Bhabiye	Aman Hayer

== Religious ==
Year	Album	Record label	Info	Music
2002	Rang Badle Talwaran De	T-Series	Tracks 9	

== Posthumous albums ==
Year	Album	Record label	Info	Music
2016	Munda Mehndi	T-Series	Tracks 9	DJ Flow
2014	Sher Ban Ke	T-Series	Tracks 9	Bhinda Aujla
2011	Gal Sun	Indya Records		Rohit Kumar
2009	Punjabi Shake	Goyal Music	Tracks 8	
