= Raj Brar =

Indian singer, actor, lyricist and music director

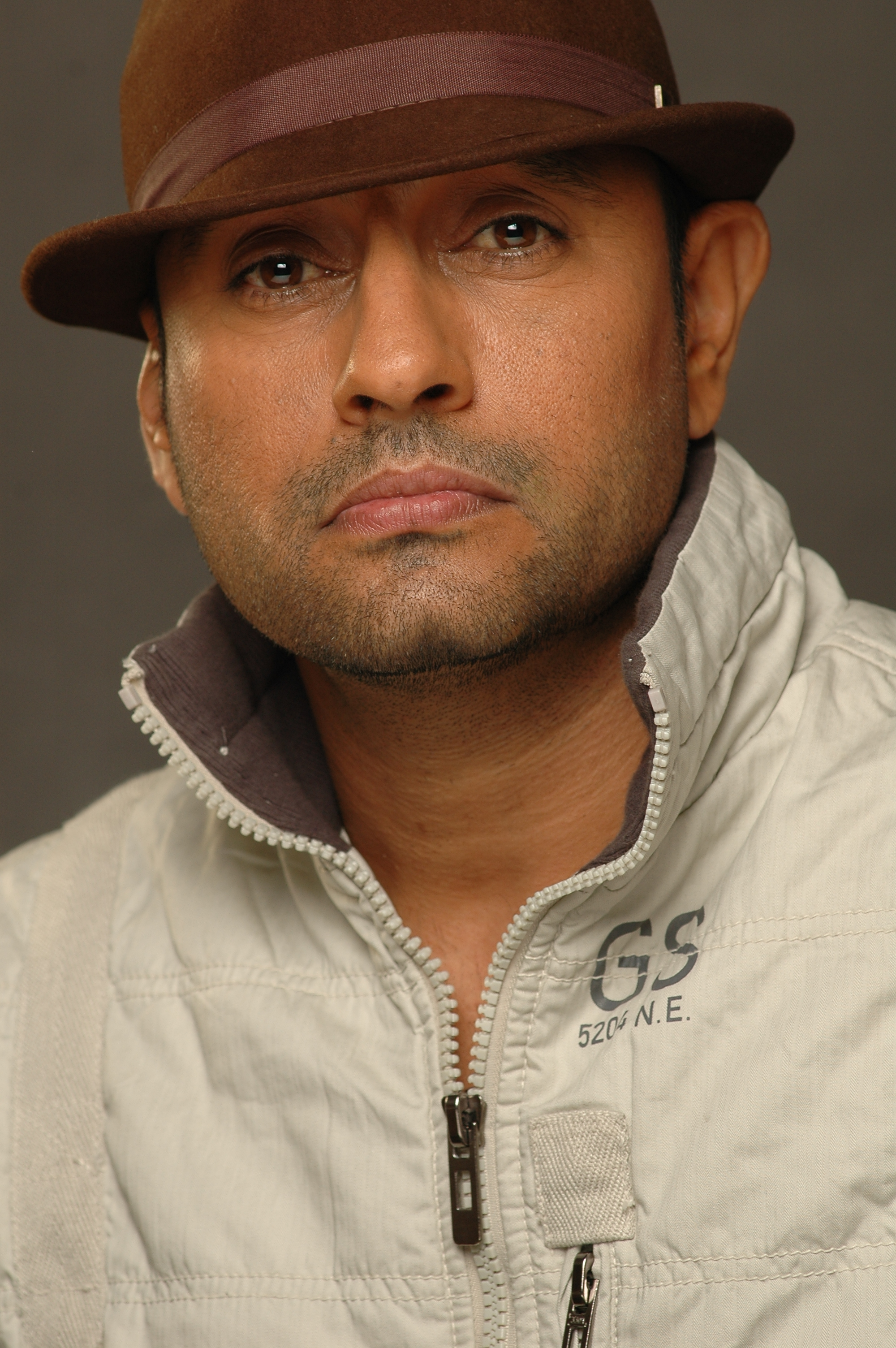
- Brar in October 2006

Background information
- Born: Rajbinder Singh Brar; 3 January 1972; Malke, Punjab, India
- Died: 31 December 2016 (aged 44) Chandigarh, India
- Genres: Music of Punjab
- Occupations: Singer, actor, lyricist, music director
- Years active: 1990–2016

Rajbinder Singh Brar popularly known as Raj Brar (3 January 1972 – 31 December 2016) was an Indian singer, actor, lyricist and music director who worked in Punjabi cinema. He was best known for his 2008 hit album Rebirth for which the music was composed by Yo Yo Honey Singh. He made his acting debut in the 2010 film Jawani Zindabaad, and he had just completed the shooting of the last movie Aam Aadmi before his death, which was released in 2018. Raj Brar died on 31 December 2016 aged 44.

== Filmography ==
Year	Title	Role	Director	Language
2010	Jawani Zindabaad	Raj	Harinder Gill	Punjabi
2013	Jatt in Mood	Raj	Sukhjinder Singh	Punjabi
2014	Police in Pollywood		Sunita Dhir	Punjabi
2018	Aam Aadmi	Raj Brar	Jagtar Uttam	Punjabi
