= Brown Rang =

2011 Punjabi song by Yo Yo Honey Singh

- Official song cover

Song by Yo Yo Honey Singh

from the album International Villager
- Language: Punjabi
- Released: 11 November 2011
- Genre: R&B, hip hop
- Length: 3:31
- Label: Speed Records
- Songwriter: Yo Yo Honey Singh
- Producer: Yo Yo Honey Singh

"Brown Rang" is a song written, composed and performed by Yo Yo Honey Singh. The song was released on 11 November 2011, as part of Singh's debut studio album, International Villager. The music video was released on 28 February 2012 and became the most trending video on YouTube of 2012. It won the top spot in the list of YouTube's most watched videos of 2012 in India with over 10 million views. The song has received over 300 million views on YouTube.

== History ==
In an interview with Radio City, Yo Yo Honey Singh stated that the song "Brown Rang" was originally written for Punjabi singer Diljit Dosanjh. He claimed that he co-wrote the song and created its beats with Dosanjh in 2010, and had even offered him the opportunity to sing the track. Diljit denied stating that the track had parts of English and was too futuristic for him. Singh then took it to Jassi Sidhu who sang it on a higher scale than what Singh had conceived for the track. At last, Singh himself performed it.

== Controversy ==
In an interview with Raaj Jones of OYE! 104.8 FM on 16 June 2015, rapper Badshah discussed the work he had done with Yo Yo Honey Singh, including the song "Brown Rang." He stated that he and Honey Singh co-wrote the track together. Badshah, in recent years, has reiterated this claim, stating to have written the entire track and accusing Singh for not properly crediting him for the track in several podcasts and interviews.

== Awards ==
- MTV VMA India award for Most Popular Indie Artist – Male for "Brown Rang"
