= Police in Pollywood =

- Film poster
- Directed by: Sunita Dhir
- Produced by: Rajinder Gautam & Monika Gautam
- Starring: Anuj Sachdeva; Bhagwant Mann; Raj Brar; Sardool Sikander; Mani Kapoor; Parmod Mautho; Sunita Dhir; Baljinder Singh Atwal; Preeto; Surinder Bath; Anita Meet; Jagdeep Jaggi; Raghveer Boli
- Music by: Jaidev Kumar
- Distributed by: Omjee Cine World
- Release date: 10 October 2014
- Country: India
- Language: Punjabi

Police in Pollywood is a 2014 Indian Punjabi-language romantic comedy film directed by Sunita Dhir, produced by Rajinder Gautam and Monika Gautam and starring Anuj Sachdeva, Bhagwant Mann, Raj Brar and Sardool Sikander.

== Reception ==
The film mostly received negative reviews. Jesse Brar of PunjabiReviews.com lashed out at the film and said "this is not even a film, its something some people have put up together".

== Cast ==
- Anuj Sachdeva
- Bhagwant Mann
- Raj Brar
- Sardool Sikander
- Mani Kapoor
- Parmod Mautho
- Sunita Dhir
- Baljinder Singh Atwal
- Preeto
- Surinder Bath
- Anita Meet
- Jagdeep Jaggi
- Raghveer Boli
- Samuel John
