= Ashok Masti =

Indian Playback singer

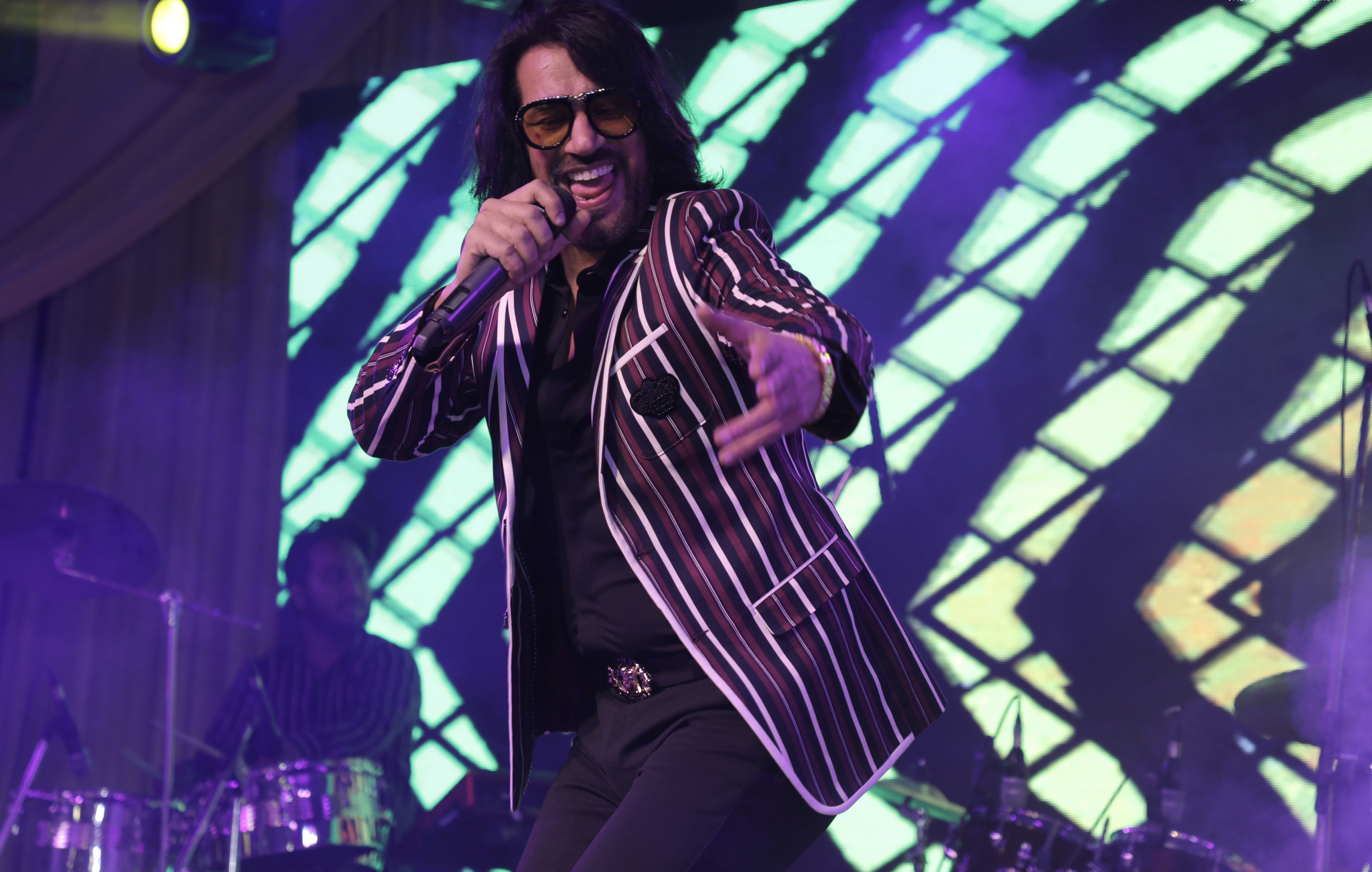
- Ashok Masti in 2019

Background information
- Born: Ashok Sachdeva; Gidderbaha, Punjab, India
- Occupations: Singer; Entertainer
- Years active: 1994 – present
- Website: www.ashokmastie.in

Ashok Masti is an Indian Playback singer. He is best known for his song "Glassy" featuring Yo Yo Honey Singh, which was first released in mid 2000s. The song was recreated as "Khadke Glassy" for the film Jabariya Jodi starring Parineeti Chopra & Siddharth Malhotra. His song "Glassy-2" has been nominated for the Best Punjabi Music Club Song of the Year Award. Ashok Masti is popularly known as Human Dynamo.

== Early life ==
Masti hails from Gidderbaha in Sri Muktsar Sahib district, Punjab.

== Career ==
He started his career by singing on small stages in small towns, then he started doing theatre as well. He was in Chandigarh for a long time regarding theatre. He then started doing concerts for the north cultural zone. Around the same time, he started doing concerts for Punjabi Academy, New Delhi. From Chandigarh he started waving the audience in New Delhi, which made him settle in New Delhi. Performing in numerous concerts in India and abroad, Masti has created a niche for himself in the world of music. His song "Nakhra Nawabi" featuring Badshah was released in 2015 and became an instant party hit. One of his songs, "Khadke Glassy", produced by Yo Yo Honey Singh, which also featured in the 2019 Bollywood movie Jabariya Jodi, became a mega blockbuster globally. In April 2020, Masti released a song "Hausla Na Chhadin" which featured 31 artists alongside him including Mika Singh, Daler Mehndi, Jasbir Jassi and Gurpreet Guggi, who came together on one platform to help motivate the nation in the time of the COVID-19 pandemic.
