= Love Shagun =

2016 film directed by Saandesh B Nayak

- Theatrical release poster
- लव शगुन
- Directed by: Saandesh B Nayak
- Screenplay by: Vivek K Rawat; Saandesh B Nayak
- Story by: Saandesh B Nayak
- Produced by: Isha Nayak
- Starring: Anuj Sachdeva, Nidhi Subbaiah; Shamin Mannan; Vikram Kochhar; Manit Joura; Taran Bajaj; Simpy Singh
- Cinematography: Karthik Palani
- Edited by: Aarti Bajaj
- Music by: Songs: Rishi Siddharth; Ashish Pandit; Band Of Bandagi; Background score: Ashish Pandit; Amit Sawant
- Production company: Saanvi Pictures Pvt. Ltd.
- Distributed by: Saanvi Nayak Films
- Release date: 26 February 2016
- Running time: 120 minutes
- Country: India
- Language: Hindi

Love Shagun (transl. Love luck) is a 2016 Indian Hindi-language romantic comedy film starring Anuj Sachdeva, Nidhi Subbaiah, Vikram Kochhar, Manit Joura, Taran Bajaj, Shamin Mannan and Simpy Singh.

== Production ==
Love Shagun has been shot in various locations like Goa, Mumbai and Bhopal. A wedding song was filmed at Madh Island. The casting of the film has been done by casting director Taran Bajaj. The shoot of the film began in 2015 and the movie was released on 26 February 2016.

== Plot ==
J.D., a young man, is at the important stage of his life of having to choose a life partner. JD, however, must face an unusual combination of problems—the persistent pressure to get married from his mother, and the astrological predictions surrounding them. Caught in a fix, JD fights the battle with his three friends, Sandy, Sumit and Deepak who have their own definitions of love. All three friends try different solutions to get JD's life sorted and plan to find a girl for him whom he can divorce. JD in the middle follows all the tricks and plans and ends up meeting Tia, a modern and independent girl, who follows her own mind. But much to their surprise, the story unfolds differently and JD finds himself in a larger soup than he had imagined. Between following his mother or his heart, JD is caught in a problem that does not seem easy to solve.

== Cast ==
- Anuj Sachdeva as J.D.
- Nidhi Subbaiah as Tia
- Shamin Mannan as Shama
- Simpy Singh as Moon
- Manit Joura as Sandy
- Vikram Kochhar as Deepak
- Taran Bajaj as Sumit
- Anoop Gautam as Manjle
- Swastika Chakraborty as Tia's Mom
- Yatin Karyekar as Sandy's father (special appearance)
- Rashmika Mandanna as a playgirl (special appearance)

== Soundtrack ==
Love Shagun

Soundtrack album by Rishi-Siddharth Ashish Pandit Band of Bandagi.
- Recorded: 2015
- Genre: Feature film soundtrack
- Label: Zee Music Company
- Producer: Isha Nayak

Kunal Ganjawala, Arijit Singh, Tochi Raina, Sakina Khan, Aditi Singh Sharma have sung for the album. Zee Music Company has bought the music rights of the film. Music Composition is by Rishi-Siddharth, Ashish Pandit and Band of Bandagi. Rishi-Siddharth is the composer of "Saathiya", "Hairaani" and "Coffee" songs, while Ashish Pandit is the composer of "Hichkiyaan" and "Kalol Ho Gaya" song is composed by Band of Bandagi.

No.	Title	Lyrics	Music	Singer(s)	Length
1.	"Hichkiyaan"	Ashish Pandit	Ashish Pandit	Aditi Singh Sharma, Bob (Rap)	4: 05
2.	"Saathiya"	Moied Elhaam	Rishi-Siddharth	Kunal Ganjawala, Rishi Singh (Backing Vocals)	3 :37
3.	"Hairaani"	Siddharth Amit Bhavsar	Rishi-Siddharth	Arijit Singh, Sakina Khan	4:40
4.	"Coffee"	Siddharth Amit Bhavsar	Rishi-Siddharth	Siddharth Amit Bhavsar, Keka Ghoshal	4:10
5.	"Kalol Ho Gaya"	Gurpreet Sam B	Band of Bandagi	Tochi Raina. (Backing Vocals :Prashant Satose, Deblina, Archana Thammala, Sayantan Dutta)	4:09
Total length:					20:01
