= Desi Kalakaar =

2014 album by Yo Yo Honey Singh

- Official album cover

Studio album by Yo Yo Honey Singh
- Released: 26 August 2014
- Recorded: 2014
- Genres: Pop, pop rap, hip-hop, trap, EDM
- Length: 29:38
- Languages: Punjabi, Hindi, English
- Label: T-Series
- Producer: Yo Yo Honey Singh

Yo Yo Honey Singh chronology
International Villager (2011)	Desi Kalakaar (2014)	Honey 3.0 (2023)

Singles from Studio
- 1. "Desi Kalakaar" Released: 26 August 2014; 2. "Love Dose" Released: 3 October 2014; 3. "One Thousand Miles" Released: 8 August 2025

Desi Kalakaar is the second studio album by Yo Yo Honey Singh. The album, containing 8 tracks, was released on 26 August 2014.

== Release ==
The album was released on 26 August 2014 at a launch event in Mumbai, where the eponymous title track was also released as a single. Singh also performed at the launch event.

The second single's MV, "Love Dose", was released on 3 October 2014 on T-Series' official YouTube channel.

In June 2025, Singh announced that the track "One Thousand Miles" from Desi Kalakaar will receive a music video, 11 years after its official release. The music video featured Singh & British actress Mandy Takhar who had previously worked with Singh in movies like Mirza - The Untold Story and Tu Mera 22 Main Tera 22. Singh, in recent years, recalled his plans to shoot music videos for other tracks from the album, but failed to do so, as shortly after the album's release, his health deteriorated due to his diagnosis of bipolar Disorder with psychotic symptoms.

== Reception ==
The video for "Love Dose", featured Singh and Urvashi Rautela, received 10 million views on YouTube within a single week. The song has received over 500 million views on YouTube. The song's dance segment was shot at Westfield Stratford City in London.

Sonakshi Sinha, who starred in the music video of the title track "Desi Kalakaar", rewrote the track "Love Dose" from an entirely female perspective, and performed her version on her Dabangg Reloaded tour in 2018.

== Track listing ==
No.	Title	Writer(s)	Length
1.	"Desi Kalakaar"	Yo Yo Honey Singh	4:14
2.	"Love Dose"	Yo Yo Honey Singh, Lil Golu	3:45
3.	"I'm Your DJ Tonight"	Yo Yo Honey Singh	4:46
4.	"Chal Mere Ghar"	Yo Yo Honey Singh	2:34
5.	"Daftar Ki Girl"	Yo Yo Honey Singh	3:08
6.	"One Thousand Miles"	Yo Yo Honey Singh, Lil Golu	4:43
7.	"Stardom"	Lil Golu, Yo Yo Honey Singh	3:44
8.	"Tanning"	Yo Yo Honey Singh	2:56
Total length:			29:50
