= Annie Zaidi (writer) =

English-language writer from India (Born:1978)

Annie Zaidi (born 1978) is an English-language writer from India. Her novel, Prelude To A Riot, won the Tata Literature Live! Awards for Book of the Year 2020. In 2019, she won The Nine Dots Prize for her work Bread, Cement, Cactus and in 2018 she won The Hindu Playwright Award for her play, Untitled-1. Her non-fiction debut, a collection of essays, Known Turf: Bantering with Bandits and Other True Tales, was short-listed for the Vodafone Crossword Book Award in 2010.

She also writes poetry (Crush, 2007), short stories (The Good Indian Girl, 2011 and Love Story # 1 To 14, 2012), plays (Jam, Jaal etcetera) and has written a novella (Gulab, 2014).

== Early life and education ==
Zaidi was born in Allahabad and raised in Rajasthan. She and her older brother were raised by their mother. Her maternal grandfather is Padma Shri laureate Urdu writer Syed Ali Jawad Zaidi.

Zaidi obtained her B.A. degree from Sophia College in Ajmer. After graduation, she joined the journalism course at Xavier Institute of Communications in Mumbai. In 2025, she completed her PhD in Creative Writing at Durham University, under the supervision of Naomi Booth and Dr. Maryam Mirza.

== Journalism career ==
After college, Zaidi began her career as a journalist. She first worked for a website, then as a reporter for Mid-Day. She went to work for Frontline in 2005. While working at Frontline, she began a blog titled Known Turf, which became the basis for a published essay collection.

In January 2008, Rouge, a supplement of the Times of India, named Zaidi on a list of Women (under 30) to Watch Out For. In 2013, she wrote "An Open Letter to Honey Singh," criticizing the abusive and objectifying content of Yo Yo Honey Singh's lyrics and videos.

She has written for publications including Caravan, Open, The Hindu, Elle, Forbes India, Femina, Marie Claire, Tehelka and the Deccan Herald. She also wrote a weekly column for DNA (Daily News and Analysis) between 2011 and 2013. Zaidi writes a column for The Hindu and teaches journalism at the OP Jindal Global University, Sonipat.

== Literary career ==
Annie Zaidi's first collection of essays, Known Turf: Bantering with Bandits and Other True Tales, was short-listed for the Vodafone Crossword Book Award in 2010. Journalist P. Sainath said of the book: "The stories on dalits in the Punjab easily rank amongst the best done on the subject" and "Above all, it is the quality of the story-telling that grips you. A beautifully written book".

A collection of short stories, The Bad Boy's Guide to the Good Indian Girl, was co-authored along with Smriti Ravindra and published by Zubaan Books in 2011. Crush, a series of 50 illustrated poems (in collaboration with illustrator Gynelle Alves) was published in 2007.

Her essays, poems and short stories have appeared in several anthologies, including Dharavi: The City Within (Harper Collins India), Mumbai Noir (Akshic/Harper Collins India), Women Changing India (Zubaan); Journeys Through Rajasthan (Rupa), First Proof: 2 (Penguin India), 21 Under 40 (Zubaan), India Shining, India Changing (Tranquebar). More of her work has appeared in literary journals such as The Little Magazine, Desilit, Pratilipi, The Raleigh Review, Mint Lounge, Indian Literature (Sahitya Akademi) and Asian Cha.

In June 2012, Elle magazine named Zaidi one of the emerging South Asian writers "whose writing we believe will enrich South Asian literature". In 2015, Zaidi published an anthology called Unbound: 2,000 Years of Indian Women's Writing.

In 2019, she won the Nine Dots Prize, with a $100,000 cash award to develop her essay Bread, Cement, Cactus into a book. Ashish Ghadiali of The Guardian said the essay was a "haunting evocation of belonging and dislocation in contemporary India" that has delivered her "on to an international platform for the first time in her decade-long career."

In 2019, she published her novel, Prelude to a Riot, which was short-listed for the JCB Prize for Literature.

Bread, Cement, Cactus was published as a book by Cambridge University Press in May 2020. A novel, City of Incident was published shortly after, in January 2022.

In early 2025, her novel The Comeback was published, and was long-listed for the Mumbai LitFest book award as well as the Chandigarh Literature Festival's Literati Awards. The novel was also shortlisted for the 2026 AutHER Awards.

== Plays and films ==
Annie's play "Untitled-1" won The Hindu Playwright Award 2018. Her play Jaal opened at Prithvi Theatre in January 2012 as part of Writers Bloc:3, a drama festival in Mumbai. Another play, So Many Socks (English), opened at the Prithvi Theatre in September 2012. It was nominated in several categories, including best script, for the META awards. The play was directed by Quasar Padamsee.

Her first full-length script, Name, Place, Animal, Thing, was shortlisted for The Hindu Metroplus Playwright Award, 2009.

A radio play, Jam, was the regional (South Asia) winner for the BBC's International Playwriting Competition 2011.

In 2016, she directed the short film Decibel that was part of Shor Se Shuruaat, an omnibus of seven short films. She was mentored by filmmaker Sriram Raghavan.

== Awards and honours ==
- 2010, short-listed, Vodafone Crossword Book Award
- 2018, winner, The Hindu Playwright Award
- 2019, winner, The Nine Dots Prize
- 2020, winner, Tata Literature Live Book of the Year
- 2020, short-listed, JCB Prize for Literature
- 2026, short-listed, AutHer Awards
