= Kheri Naudh Singh =

Kheri Naudh Singh is a village in the Indian state of Punjab. The village is a political division of Fatehgarh Sahib district and Khamano tehsil. Kheri Naudh Singh has population of 1,076 with 565 males and 511 females (2011 Census) in an area of 155 hectares (380 acres). This village is also known as the center point for three cities, Khanna, Khamano and Sirhind. It is connected with major roads from Khanna to Kheri and Bhadla to Kheri Naudh Singh. Punjab Roadways and P.T.U. transit also conduct their buses to this town connecting it to Ropar and capital city Chandigarh. This village was established by King Naudh Singh and this is the reason behind its name. The King Naudh Singh's fort is maintained in good condition in the town. It is a local town for other villages; there are educational institutes and some government related offices to help people when they need it.
