= Farhan Khan (actor) =

Indian model and television actor

Farhan Asif Khan
- Born: 6 May 1983 (age 42); Burhanpur, Madhya Pradesh, India
- Occupations: Actor, Model
- Years active: 2010 – Present
- Height: 6 ft 2 in (188 cm)

Farhan Khan is an Indian model and television actor. He is mostly known for his brief role in Sony TV's Chhanchhan.

== Overview ==
Farhan Khan was born in Burhanpur. He comes from a family of people with a film, TV and stage background. His grandfather was a distributor and film publicist and his father is a theatre artiste, a film and TV producer and a documentary filmmaker. His uncle is an established producer and also makes documentaries edits of education, and his brother Tabrez Khan is a director of TV shows like Bhagyavidhaata among others. His older brother and mother are both writers.

== Career ==
Khan's first television role was the male lead in Sony Entertainment Television's show, Chhanchhan it failed to gain ratings.' Chhanchhan ended on 19 September 2013.
