= Lungi Dance =

2013 single by Yo Yo Honey Singh

Single by Yo Yo Honey Singh

from the album Chennai Express
- Released: 13 July 2013
- Recorded: 2013
- Genre: Film soundtrack, pop-folk
- Label: T-Series
- Songwriters: Yo Yo Honey Singh, Lil Golu

Music video
- "Lungi Dance" on YouTube

"Lungi Dance" is a 2013 Indian track composed and performed by Indian singer and rapper, Yo Yo Honey Singh for the soundtrack of the 2013 Indian film Chennai Express. The song is a tribute to Indian actor Rajinikanth.

The soundtrack was officially released on 1 July 2013.

== Release ==
"Lungi Dance" was released as the ninth single from the album. The launch of the original music of the film took place in Mumbai, where performances were seen by the film's music directors and cast members. The event's telecast rights were sold to a TV channel for INR48 crore (US$7.7 million). The song is said to have significantly popularised the lungi, a traditional dress in India.

== Lyrics ==
"Lungi Dance"
A sample of "Lungi Dance"

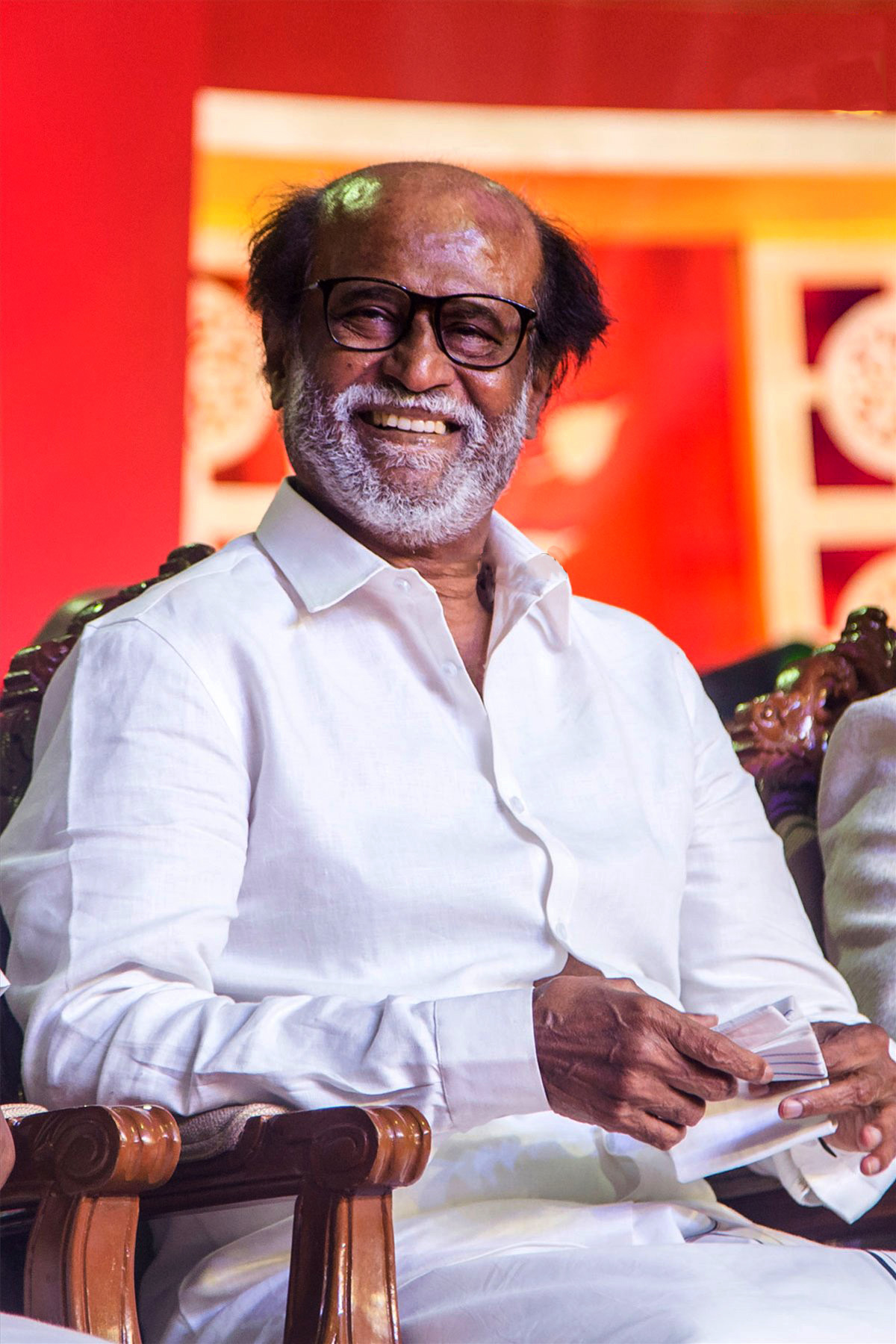
Actor Rajinikanth in 2018

The song was composed by Yo Yo Honey Singh, as a tribute to Indian movie actor Rajinikanth.

== Critical response ==
"Lungi Dance" received mainly mixed reviews from critics in India. Mohar Basu of Koimoi wrote in his review, "I am quite assured that not every Rajni fan has Lungi as their favorite attire and neither will they appreciate Lassi in their coconut! Not that I was expecting meaning in the lyrics of the song, but the song's words are as meaningless as the aimless Deepika Padukone shaking her leg in this too-desperate-to-be-funny song." The Firstpost review said, "I may have to go swallow some Kafka and Faulkner after this column to feel smart again, but at least I know that I have done my Patient Zero duty in spreading the Lungi Dance virus. Thalaivar, everyone!

== Controversy ==
The film's music composing duo, Vishal–Shekhar, were under the impression that they were the only musicians working on Chennai Express. Meanwhile, Honey Singh was asked by the film director to perform in the promotional song of "Lungi Dance". When rumours surfaced about Honey Singh's involvement, Vishal Dadlani tweeted, "It's hilarious and pathetic how desperately this tacky rape-rapper is trying to ride on the fame of SRK and Chennai Express (sic)". The rumour turned out to be true and the composers felt cheated. Dadlani and Shekhar Ravjiani did not promote the film's music nor attended the film's promos.

== Charts ==
=== Weekly charts ===
2013 weekly chart performance for "Lungi Dance"
Chart (2013)	Peak position
UK Official Asian Music Chart (OCC)	12

2014 weekly chart performance for "Lungi Dance"
Chart (2014)	Peak position
UK Official Asian Music Chart (OCC)	19
