= Chennai Express =

2013 Indian film by Rohit Shetty

- Theatrical release poster
- Directed by: Rohit Shetty
- Screenplay by: Yunus Sajawal
- Dialogues by: Farhad-Sajid
- Story by: K. Subash
- Produced by: Ronnie Screwvala; Siddharth Roy Kapur; Gauri Khan; Karim Morani
- Starring: Deepika Padukone; Shah Rukh Khan
- Narrated by: Shah Rukh Khan
- Cinematography: Dudley
- Edited by: Steven H. Bernard
- Music by: Songs: Vishal–Shekhar; Score: Amar Mohile
- Production companies: UTV Motion Pictures; Red Chillies Entertainment
- Distributed by: UTV Motion Pictures
- Release dates: 8 August 2013 (International); 9 August 2013 (India)
- Running time: 141 minutes
- Country: India
- Language: Hindi
- Budget: ₹115 crore
- Box office: ₹423 crore

Chennai Express is a 2013 Indian Hindi-language romantic action comedy film directed by Rohit Shetty and produced by UTV Motion Pictures and Red Chillies Entertainment. The film stars Deepika Padukone and Shah Rukh Khan with Nikitin Dheer and Sathyaraj in supporting roles. It revolves around Rahul Mithaiwala, a businessman who accidentally boards the eponymous train and journeys from Mumbai to Rameswaram with the daughter of an influential crime boss. The film, primarily in Hindi, contains significant Tamil dialogue due to its setting in Rameswaram.

The first planned collaboration between Khan and Shetty was a remake of Angoor (1982). The script of Chennai Express, which was initially written as a backup project for Khan, was chosen instead. Conceived as a "commercial romance", the film was originally titled Ready Steady Po. Filming began in Mehboob Studio in October 2012 and was completed by May 2013. A large part of the film was set in Ooty, for which sets were constructed in Wai and also in Ramoji Film City. The soundtrack for Chennai Express was composed by Vishal–Shekhar, with the background score being composed by Amar Mohile. UTV Motion Pictures came on board as producer and distributor, marking its first active project with Khan after Swades (2004).

Chennai Express was released theatrically in international markets on 8 August 2013 and a day later in India. The film received mixed reviews from critics and it broke several box office records in India and abroad, becoming the quickest film to collect ₹1 billion (US$17.07 million) net domestically. The film surpassed 3 Idiots (2009) to become the highest-grossing Hindi film worldwide at that point. The film become second highest grossing Indian film in 2013. Chennai Express has stayed among the top 50 highest-grossing Indian films for over a decade, from its 2013 release to 2024. With a worldwide gross of ₹395.92–424.54 crore, the film's blend of romance, comedy, and action has resonated with audiences worldwide, securing its place as one of the most beloved and commercially successful films in Indian cinema.

At the 59th Filmfare Awards, Chennai Express received 7 nominations, including Best Film, Best Director (Shetty), Best Actor (Khan) and Best Actress (Padukone).

== Plot ==
Rahul Mithaiwala, a rich bachelor, lives in Mumbai with his paternal grandparents. Rahul's grandfather Y. Y. Mithaiwala is a businessman and owner of a chain of confectionery shops. Before Y. Y.'s 100th-birthday celebration, Rahul's friends Bobby and Baman invite him to a vacation in Goa, which he accepts. Meanwhile, Y. Y. dies on the eve of the celebration when he witnesses Sachin Tendulkar on TV in a cricket match get dismissed on his 99th run. After Y. Y.'s funeral, Rahul's grandmother Neetu tells Rahul that Y. Y. wanted his ashes to be divided into two parts—one part to be immersed in the Ganga, and the other in Rameswaram. Neetu asks Rahul to take the ashes to Rameswaram and disperse them. Rahul reluctantly accepts her request, but is also eager to visit Goa.

Rahul, Bobby and Baman plan to dump the ashes in Goa, but Neetu wants to see him off, forcing Rahul to travel by train. Rahul books a single ticket on the Chennai Express, planning to meet Bobby and Baman along the way, at Kalyan Junction station. However, Rahul forgets to take the ashes while alighting, where he almost misses the train when he returns to collect them. While trying to leave the train, Rahul notices a young woman running to board it and helps her and four men board the moving train, but the train leaves the station before he can get off.

Rahul tries to flirt with the woman, who starts communicating by singing parodies of Hindi film songs, and explains that the four men are trying to kidnap her. Rahul lends her his phone so that she can contact her friends, but the men with her grab it and throw it off the train. Rahul is annoyed, but says nothing because the men are carrying weapons. Rahul tells the Travelling Ticket Examiner about them, but they push the Examiner into a river below a bridge. A panicked Rahul learns that the four men are her cousins and that her name is Meenalochni "Meenamma" Azhagusundaram. Meenamma is fleeing from a forced marriage to a gangster Tangaballi, Meenamma's father Durgeshwara "Durgesh" Azhagusundaram is a powerful mafia kingpin and landlord in Tamil Nadu.

Rahul (Shah Rukh Khan) helps Meenamma (Deepika Padukone) board the train, a spoof of the famous train scene in the 1995 film Dilwale Dulhania Le Jayenge

Meenamma takes Rahul to Durgesh and introduces Rahul as her lover. Tangaballi challenges Rahul to a duel that Rahul unknowingly accepts due to his lack of understanding Tamil. On the night of the duel, Rahul escapes with the help of a local policeman Shamsher, but he ends up on a boat with Sri Lankan smugglers. A gun battle ensues between the police force and the smugglers. The police officers investigate and take Rahul into custody, but Rahul tells his story and ends up back in Komban.

Terrified and once again surrounded by Durgesh's sickle-wielding henchmen, Rahul pretends to take Meenamma hostage and escapes with her in Durgesh's car, battling Durgesh's men. When the car breaks down, Rahul and Meenamma quarrel and part ways. Rahul, not knowing which way to go, returns to Meenamma, who takes him to the Vidhamba village. Meenamma tells the villagers that they are a married couple who need protection and rest, to which the villagers agree.

Meenamma realises that she has fallen in love with Rahul. When Rahul plans to sneak away, Meenamma argues, not wanting to earn the villagers' distrust. Tangaballi catches Rahul as he tries to leave, but the villagers help them escape again. Meenamma persuades Rahul to disperse Y. Y.'s ashes and travels with him to Rameswaram, where they complete the rite. On their way back, Rahul realises that he has fallen for Meenamma and does not tell her where they are going. Rahul takes Meenamma back to Durgesh and tries to make him understand and honour Meenamma's wish, where he also tells Meenamma that he loves her.

Rahul tells Tangaballi and his goons that he is ready for the fight. In the fight that follows, Rahul is severely beaten, but emerges victorious. Durgesh and Tangaballi reform, accepting that the love of a common man like Rahul is bigger than their physical ability and political influence. Durgesh allows Rahul to marry Meena. Later, Rahul leaves a message that love knows no regional or language barriers and that with a strong heart, there is no limit to what the common man can achieve.

== Cast ==
- Deepika Padukone as Meenalochini "Meenamma" Azhagusundaram
- Shah Rukh Khan as Rahul Mithaiwala
- Nikitin Dheer as Thangabali
- Sathyaraj as Durgeshwara "Durgesh" Azhagusundaram
- Lekh Tandon as Y. Y. Mithaiwala
- Kamini Kaushal as Neetu Mithaiwala
- Mukesh Tiwari as Inspector Shamsher Singh
- Puvisha Manoharan as Radhika "Radha" Azhagusundaram, Meenamma's cousin
- Manu Malik as Baman, Rahul's friend
- Rakesh Kukreti as Bobby, Rahul's friend
- Mohan Raman as the village priest
- Yogi Babu as the Sri Lankan smuggler
- Jasper as Durgeshwara's henchman
- Besant Ravi as Durgeshwara's henchman
- King Kong as a passerby who speaks in gibberish to Rahul.
- Jimmy Moses as a truck driver
- Delhi Ganesh as a villager
- Priyamani in special appearance in atheitem song "1 2 3 4 Get on the Dance Floor"

== Production ==
=== Development and casting ===
Rohit Shetty had originally planned to team up with Shah Rukh Khan for a remake of the 1982 film, Angoor. After the 2011 blockbuster Singham, Shetty had begun writing the script of the film but left it half-finished. The script of Chennai Express was ready for Khan as a back-up, because of the difficulty of obtaining the actor's filming dates. Upon reading the script, Khan liked the idea and agreed to star in it before the Angoor remake, causing Angoor's remake to be postponed. Shetty said the film is "a hard-core commercial film with a romantic angle. The story is about this man's travel from Mumbai to Rameshwaram and what happens during the journey." About 68 minutes of footage were enhanced with CGI by Reliance MediaWorks.

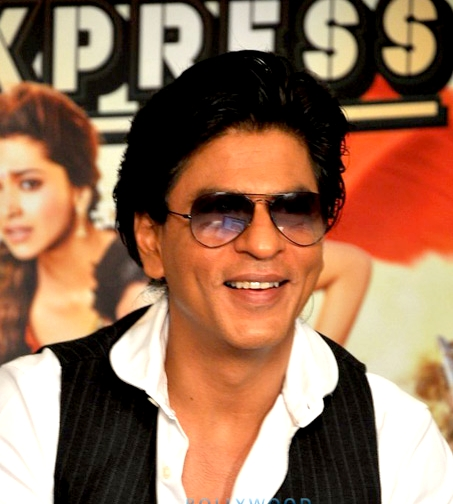
Chennai Express was initially written as a backup project for Khan (pictured).

Khan was the first actor to be approached with the script and was the first lead actor to be signed for the film. Rohit Shetty stated that despite the title, Khan would not play a South Indian in the film. The casting of the lead heroine was the subject of much press speculation; Kareena Kapoor, Asin and Deepika Padukone were rumoured to be involved. Shetty denied those rumours, stating that the cast would be finalised in April 2012, and that he was going to cast an established actress in the role. In October 2012, it was confirmed that Deepika Padukone had been signed to play the female lead opposite Khan, and photographs showing Padukone and Khan shooting were released. This was Padukone's second film opposite Khan, with whom she made her Bollywood debut in the 2007 blockbuster Om Shanti Om. Starting with this film, which was released on Women's Day, Khan wished to have the name of his female co-star appear above his own in the credits.

Sathyaraj was cast to play the role of Padukone's character's father, making his debut in Bollywood. Actress Priyamani was signed in January 2013 for an item number in the film replacing Nayanthara; both the actresses would eventually go on to star alongside Khan in Jawan. Other personalities from Tamil cinema, including Delhi Ganesh, Mohan Raman, Manorama and Kottachi, appear in minor roles; however, scenes involving the latter two did not make the final cut. The film was initially titled as Ready Steady Po (Po means Go in Tamil). However, to emphasise on the connection with South India, the film was retitled as Chennai Express with the planned title used as the tagline.

=== Filming and post-production ===
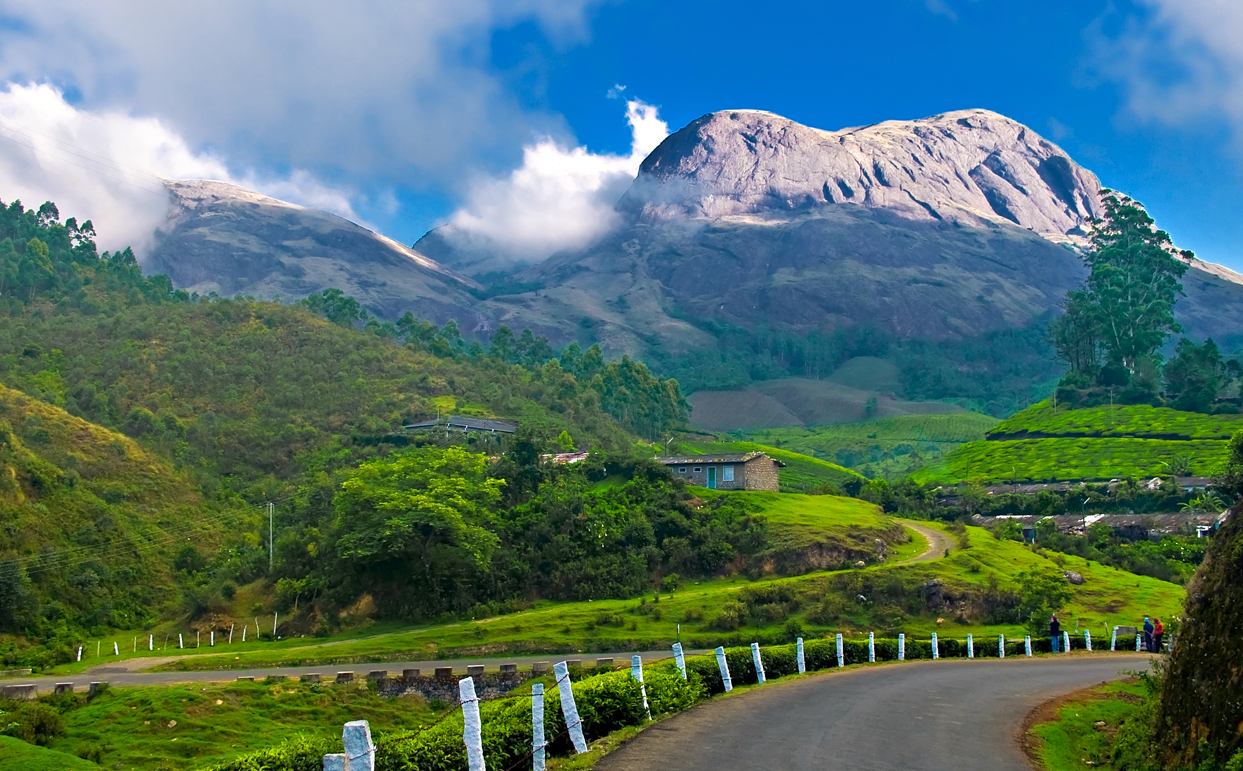
The Munnar Hill station in Kerala, one of the film's major locations

Filming on the project began at Mehboob Studio in Mumbai on 5 October 2012. Additional filming was done at Chhatrapati Shivaji Terminus with a minimal crew. Stills of the lead actor were unofficially released in mid-October 2012. In November 2012, the cast and crew went to Goa to begin filming the scenes set there. Vasco da Gama railway station was used to portray as Kalyan Junction railway station. A romantic scene on board a train passing next to Dudhsagar Falls was also shot. In December 2012, the crew went to Jakarta to film certain scenes. The Pamban Bridge also known as Annai Indira Gandhi Bridge, connecting the town of Mandapam in Tamil Nadu with Pamban Island, and Rameswaram was the scene for the song "Tera Rastaa Chhodoon Na".

In January 2013, a shoot was supposedly scheduled to take place in Ooty, but since Khan felt that Ooty was too far from Mumbai, several locations from Ooty were reconstructed on the outskirts of Panchgani in Wai by the art director Narendra Ruharikar. It took over 40 days and ₹ 15 million to build the required sets. Filming in Wai took the entire month of March 2013. A 10-day shooting schedule in Munnar, Kerala, began in mid-April 2013; scenes were filmed at Devikulam Lake, Meesapulimala, Wagavara and Kannimala. Filming was stopped for several days because of heavy rainfall, resulting in the schedule being slightly extended until end of the same month. A press conference was held in Munnar. In May 2013, scenes were filmed in North Goa. Padukone finished shooting on 25 May 2013. Khan flew to Ramoji Film City, Hyderabad in May 2013 to film his remaining scenes. Though the film has several Tamil dialogues, Khan said the makers intentionally excluded subtitles to emphasise the language barrier between the Tamil speakers and the lead character. Instead, Padukone's character translates some of the Tamil dialogues.

Chennai Express was produced by Gauri Khan, Karim Morani, Ronnie Screwvala and Siddharth Roy Kapur under the Red Chillies Entertainment and UTV Motion Pictures banners. It was released internationally by UTV in its second project for Khan after Swades (2004), which Screwvala co-produced; a transition shot in the film shares similarities with the intro of Walt Disney Pictures, which owned UTV.

== Music ==
The original background score of Chennai Express was composed by Amar Mohile; the songs were composed by the duo Vishal–Shekhar, and the lyrics were written by Amitabh Bhattacharya and Yo Yo Honey Singh. Recording of the songs began in late October 2012. The track "Ready Steady Po" was recorded in November 2012 by the music's composers. Several sources said that the director and actor were unsatisfied with the score. The director was reportedly asked to plan for a different musical composition. However, the composers denied these rumours. In mid-April 2013, singer S. P. Balasubrahmanyam recorded the title track for the film, marking his return to Bollywood for playback after an absence of fifteen years. He said the song celebrated the spirit of togetherness. Initially, Balasubrahmanyam was apprehensive, but chose to sing due to the content and leads of the film. The song "1 2 3 4 Get On The Dance Floor" was released as a promotional single on World Music Day. On 27 June 2013, the video promo of the song "Titli" was released, and on 11 July 2013, the promo video of "Kashmir Main Tu Kanyakumari" was released. On 19 July 2013, T-Series uploaded a song to its official channel on YouTube; sung by Honey Singh. The song was titled "Lungi Dance – The 'Thalaivar(r)' Tribute" in honour of the film actor Rajinikanth. On 25 July 2013, a promotional video of the song "Tera Rasta Main Chhodoon Na" was released. The music album was launched on 1 July 2013.

== Release ==
The film had paid previews in India on 8 August 2013, with ten to twelve shows at multiplexes. Chennai Express was scheduled to be released in non-traditional international markets. In Peru, it was the first Hindi film to be released on the same day as in India. Chennai Express was also released in Morocco, Germany, Switzerland, Austria, France, and Israel. The price of tickets for Chennai Express was increased 40 percent above the usual tariff during the weekday shows and up to 20 percent on weekends; although this increase was not uniformly applied in all multiplexes.

The film was released in 2,550 cinemas across 3,550 screens in India, and across 700 screens internationally—including 196 screens in North America, 175 in the United Kingdom, 55 in the Middle East, and 30 in Australia—the widest Bollywood release up to that point.

=== Marketing ===
A first look of Chennai Express was released on 1 January 2013. A 31-second title track teaser, sung by S. P. Balasubrahmanyam, was released on 23 May 2013. The official trailer of the film was released at an event in Mumbai on 13 June 2013; two days after its launch it exceeded four million views on YouTube. The outfits worn by Khan and Padukone in the film were auctioned; proceeds from the sale were donated to a charity. The auction took place around the day of the film's release. A Karaoke app developed by Singbox—a Swedish gaming studio—was launched on 2 August 2013 for Android and iOS based smartphones.

Khan promoted his film on the reality television shows Comedy Nights with Kapil, Taarak Mehta Ka Ooltah Chashmah, Madhubala Ek Ishq Ek Junoon, DID Super Moms, Jhalak Dikhhla Jaa 6 and Indian Idol Junior. The Zeitgeist—Google's year-end compilation of the most frequent search queries—named Chennai Express the most trending topic of 2013 in India. The film's satellite television rights were sold to Zee Network for ₹480 million (US$8.19 million). The agreement was linked to the film's box office revenue—the first deal of its kind in Indian cinema. If Chennai Express collected over ₹1.3 billion (US$22.19 million) net, then for every ₹100 million earned after that, the producers would get an additional ₹20 million. The film had its television premiere on 20 October 2013, and was seen by a record number of viewers, almost doubling that of the highest rated fiction show. It helped its broadcaster, Zee TV, to reach the top position among General Entertainment Channels that month.

=== Legal issues ===
Along with Once Upon ay Time in Mumbai Dobaara!, Chennai Express was initially abandoned by Pakistani distributors and exhibitors because four Pakistani films were released on the same day. (Note: The films were ‘Waar’, ‘Main Hoon Shahid Afridi’, ‘Ishq Khuda’ and ‘Josh’.) The release dates were postponed to 15 and 9 August, respectively. During its Wai schedule of filming, the film's unit ran into trouble for using too much water from Dhom Dam, in the drought-stricken Satara district of Maharashtra. The state's relief and rehabilitation minister, Patangrao Kadam, addressed the problem.

The film's poster and trailer, released on Twitter and YouTube, were criticised by some Tamil media for their depiction of Tamil ethos. They said Padukone's heavily accented dialogue resembled a Malayalee accent rather than a Tamil one. Padukone defended the film, saying that it did not parody South Indian culture and that most of the crew, including herself, are South Indians. She later said, "Why would we spoof our own culture?"

On 31 July 2013, the Nationalist political party Maharashtra Navnirman Sena's film wing threatened to disrupt the film's premiere; it reportedly attempted to dislodge ongoing popular Marathi movies from cinemas that show only one film at a time. The party was upset with reports that the distributors of Chennai Express had demanded prime slots in single-screen cinemas, and at some multiplexes, where the superhit Marathi film Duniyadari (2013) had been popular since 19 July. On 1 August 2013, both the film directors, Rohit Shetty and Sanjay Jadhav were called on by Raj Thackeray to find a solution. After listening to both parties, Thackeray ruled that if Duniyadari was not removed from single-screen cinemas across the state, then the MNS would not object to the release of Chennai Express in Maharashtra. Chennai Express was released in 10 languages.

Upon release, the film's authenticity was questioned. Deepika Padukone's character had more similarities to Malayalis despite playing a Tamil character: she uses a nasal accent and wears a white sari. The song "Lungi Dance" was not considered an apt title for the song since the men wear veshtis in the film.

=== Home media ===
The film digital streaming rights were acquired by Netflix.

== Reception ==
=== Critical response ===
Chennai Express received mixed reviews from critics.

=== India ===
Taran Adarsh of Bollywood Hungama gave 4/5 stars and wrote "On the whole, 'Chennai Express' has the trademark Rohit Shetty stamp all over. You seek entertainment, entertainment and entertainment in a film like 'Chennai Express' and the movie lives up to the hype and hoopla surrounding it." Rachit Gupta of Filmfare gave 4/5 stars and wrote "The film's peppered with humorous set pieces and colourful locales and songs. Shetty makes chettinad-style masala movies. And that's the perfect description of this film. If you don't plan to engage in a multi-lateral critique of dramatic elements and narrative, this film can be fun." Sarita Tanwar Of DNA gave 3.5/5 stars and wrote "This is a treat for all Hindi film lovers. It has all the ingredients you'd expect from a big commercial masala film—big star cast, drama, action, comedy, songs, the car chases and the big finish, all delivered in Shetty's unapologetic ishtyle ... Overall, this is a bubblegum blockbuster." Meena Iyer of Times of India gave 3.5/5 stars and wrote "Chennai Express is a magnificently mounted film. In an ode to his own cinema—read Golmaal series or Bol Bachchan, Rohit Shetty, the director, who has grosser in Bollywood's 100-crore club, ups the scale for his Eid offering." Saibal Chatterjee of NDTV gave 3/5 stars and wrote "The whole-hearted zeal that SRK and Deepika bring to the table and the steady flow of funny one-liners serve Shetty's purpose well, turning Chennai Express into a full-on masala film that is completely unapologetic about its intentions. And that is its USP [Unique Selling Point]." Zee News gave 3/5 stars, stating that if one ignores the platitudes, the absence of "punch" in the script and predictability, then the person is "on board for a fun ride" with Chennai Express. India Today gave 3/5 stars and wrote "The good news first. 'Chennai Express' is a pleasant and likeable film in parts. The bad news is, it does nothing for Shah Rukh Khan's indomitable star power except to tell us he can still play a 40-year [old] Rahul without faltering." Abhishek Gupta of India TV gave 2.5/5 stars and wrote "The comedy along with the action is rarely served with equal entertainment in today's cinema. We discern Rohit Shetty for his mass leisure which includes cars fluttering from the unknown corners and comedy which isn't slapstick but works." Baradwaj Rangan wrote, "Still, given the material, Shetty does more right than wrong...Shetty fashions a Shah Rukh Khan showreel, borrowing bits from his greatest hits, and gives us an unfettered avatar of the star that the star himself has seemed somewhat ashamed, of late, to embrace."

Shubhra Gupta of The Indian Express gave 2.5/5 stars and wrote that the film comes up with some genuinely funny moments. She commended Padukone's looks, although she criticized aspects of her stagecraft skills. Sukanya Verma of Rediff.com gave 2.5/5 stars and wrote "Chennai Express evokes a few laughs but otherwise it decides to shift tracks from droll comedy to dreadful drama." Khalid Mohamed of Deccan Chronicle gave 2.5/5 stars and wrote "Board Chennai Express at your own risk". Rajeev Masand of CNN-IBN gave 2/5 stars and said the film was a "big, fat" bore. He commented that Chennai Express was a "bloated vanity project", and felt that the lead actor could have performed better. Anupama Chopra gave 2/5 stars and wrote "Chennai Express plays neither to Rohit's strengths nor to Shah Rukh's. It's a strangely sloppy mishmash of cheesy humour, half-hearted romance, half-baked emotion and head-banging action. The film is filled with gigantic men whose size functions as a punch line." Mayank Shekhar of Dainik Bhaskar gave 1/5 stars and wrote "You've paid for the ticket? Yes. Now just sit back and suffer." Raja Sen of Rediff gave 1/5 stars and wrote "Shah Rukh Khan yelps and squeaks and shrieks and bares fangs and pouts and, well, exhausts himself overcompensating at every step, despite nobody else in the film following this template."

=== Overseas ===
Rachel Saltz of The New York Times wrote, "'Chennai Express' feels like a sumptuous meal with carefully chosen wine and tasty appetizers but a botched main course. Money and visual care have been lavished on this Bollywood action-comedy-romance and glossy stars engaged (Shah Rukh Khan and Deepika Padukone). But the movie chugs along for most of its 2 hours and 20 minutes searching for comedy and characters in a frantically overplotted story." Sneha May Francis of Emirates 24/7 wrote, "Rohit Shetty's s(h)tyle of romance relies heavily on buffoonery and will be applauded mainly by Shah Rukh Khan loyalists". She added, "Rohit's carnival-like comedy coaxes some laughs, but can leave you exhausted." Sneha said that Padukone's performance "outshines" that of Khan. Ronnie Scheib of Variety wrote, "Shah Rukh Khan and Deepika Padukone are ill matched in this overworked comedy/romance/actioner ... Shetty's need to maintain his characters' romantic heroism constantly grates against his depictions of their ridiculousness." Simon Foster of the Special Broadcasting Service gave 2/5 stars and described it as "a loud, lame-brained romantic comedy from the (very) broad directorial brush of Rohit Shetty, SRK's over-hyped vehicle sees the charismatic but ageing actor badly miscast and easily overshadowed by his leading lady, Deepika Padukone."

== Box office ==
At the time, Chennai Express became the highest-grossing Bollywood film, both in India and around the world, when it collected ₹396 crore (US$67.58 million). It currently stands as the eighteenth-highest-grossing Bollywood film worldwide. The film's gross broke the ₹392 crore (US$66.9 million) record set by 3 Idiots, according to Box Office India. The film's final worldwide gross was ₹424 crore (US$72.31 million).

=== India ===
During paid previews, Chennai Express performed well, with the Hindi version collecting ₹ 67.5 million, surpassing the previous record held by 3 Idiots, according to Box Office India. The film collected ₹ 292.5 million on its opening day, making it the second-highest opening day collection behind Ek Tha Tiger. The film broke the second and third day box office records, collecting ₹264.30 million (US$4.51 million), and ₹292.1 million (US$4.98 million), respectively, and collected ₹870.8 million (₹938.3 million including paid previews), breaking the previous weekend record set by Yeh Jawaani Hai Deewani. Chennai Express set another record for worldwide opening gross, earning ₹1.59 billion (US$27.13 million) in the three-day weekend. The film performed well on Monday, collecting over ₹120 million (US$2.05 million). It grossed ₹115 million (US$1.96 million) on its first Tuesday, becoming Shah Rukh Khan's highest-grossing film in India. The film grossed ₹125.60 million (US$2.14 million) on Wednesday.

Box Office India reported that the film grossed ₹190 million (US$3.24 million) net on Thursday, taking its first week total (including paid previews) to ₹1.461.50 billion (US$24.93 million), beating the previous record of Ek Tha Tiger. It had a worldwide gross of ₹2.5 billion (US$42.66 million) in the first seven days. The film collected ₹237.50 million (US$4.05 million) on its second weekend, taking the total domestic net to ₹1.68 billion (US$28.67 million) , and also became the second-highest-grossing Bollywood film in ten days with a worldwide gross of ₹3.14 billion (US$53.59 million) .

The film earned ₹1.85 billion (US$31.57 million) in two weeks and had collected ₹1.94 billion (US$33.11 million) after its third weekend in the domestic market. It grossed ₹160 million (US$2.73 million) in its third week, bringing up its total to ₹2.00.75 billion (US$34.13 million). Chennai Express broke the domestic net record set by 3 Idiots in its fourth weekend and added around ₹57.40 million (US$979,558.96) in week four to take the total to ₹2.06 billion (US$35.15 million). The film collected ₹3.5 million (US$59,729.2) on its sixth week, for a final total of ₹2.08.25 billion (US$35.5 million). (Note: While Box Office India confirms that the film grossed ₹2.08 billion (US$35.5 million) at the end of its run, other trade analysts like Taran Adarsh and Komal Nahta claimed an 8-percent higher figure of ₹2.27 billion (US$38.74 million). Nevertheless, Box Office India's figures have been used.) The film's lifetime domestic distributor share stands at ₹1.15 billion (US$19.63 million), breaking Ek Tha Tiger's previous record of ₹1.07 billion (US$18.26 million).

=== Overseas ===
Chennai Express also broke overseas records; during paid previews in the UK the film collected more than any first day of a Bollywood film in the UK. The film broke opening weekend records in foreign territories, taking in ₹504.70 million (US$8.61 million), including record collections from key markets in the US ($2.22 million), the UAE (AED 7.73 million) and the UK (£934,118). Chennai Express set a record for opening weekends overseas, grossing US$7.1 million. It was also successful in Pakistan, where it collected Rs. 18.4 million (equivalent to Rs. 94 million or US$330,000 in 2021) in its opening weekend. By 18 August, the film had broken all box office records in Karachi by grossing over Rs. 40 million (US$140,000).

The film earned ₹720 million (US$12.29 million) in just nine days in overseas markets. By the second weekend, it had grossed approximately US$14 million. Chennai Express had grossed about US$16 million by its third weekend overseas and US$16.85 million by the fourth weekend. By the fifth weekend, the film had grossed about US$17.25 million abroad. It was still collecting in its sixth weekend, taking its total to US$17.40 million.

=== Records ===
Box office records made by Chennai Express
Box office record	Record details	Previous record holder	Ref.
Number of screens	3,700 screens	Dabangg 2 (2012, 3,450 screens)	
Paid previews	₹67.50 million (US$1.15 million)	3 Idiots (2009, ₹27.50 million (US$469,300.9) )	
Second day	₹264.30 million (US$4.51 million)	Ra.One (2011, ₹229 million (US$3.91 million) )	
Third day	₹292.10 million (US$4.98 million)	Yeh Jawaani Hai Deewani (2013, ₹224.40 million (US$3.83 million) )	
Opening weekend	₹870 million (US$14.85 million) (₹920 million (US$15.7 million) including paid previews)	Yeh Jawaani Hai Deewani (₹630 million (US$10.75 million) )	
Opening week	₹1.39 billion (US$23.72 million) (₹1.461.50 billion (US$24.93 million) including paid previews)	Ek Tha Tiger (2012, ₹1.28 billion (US$21.84 million) )	
Worldwide opening weekend	₹1.67 billion (US$28.5 million)	Yeh Jawaani Hai Deewani (₹1.07 billion (US$18.26 million) )	
Opening weekend in the United States	$2,220,497	My Name Is Khan (2010, $1,944,027)	
Overseas opening weekend	$7,100,000	My Name Is Khan ($5,300,000)	
Domestic nett. gross (excludes Entertainment tax)	₹2.08.25 billion (US$35.5 million)	3 Idiots (₹2.02 billion (US$34.47 million) )	
Distributor share (Domestic)	₹1.15 billion (US$19.63 million)	Ek Tha Tiger (₹1.07 billion (US$18.26 million) )	
Worldwide gross	₹3.95 billion (US$67.41 million)	3 Idiots (₹3.92 billion (US$66.9 million) )	

== Game ==
A platform running game titled Chennai Express: Escape from Rameshwaram, based on the film and featuring Shahrukh Khan and Deepika Padukone, was developed by Indiagames, Disney-UTV's digital wing, and launched on 24 July 2013 for Android systems. In the game, the player rides a virtual roller-coaster, fighting off goons and dodging obstacles while they attempt to collect over 10,000 coins in order to unlock Padukone's game avatar.
