= Yo Yo Honey Singh =

Indian singer and record producer (born 1983)

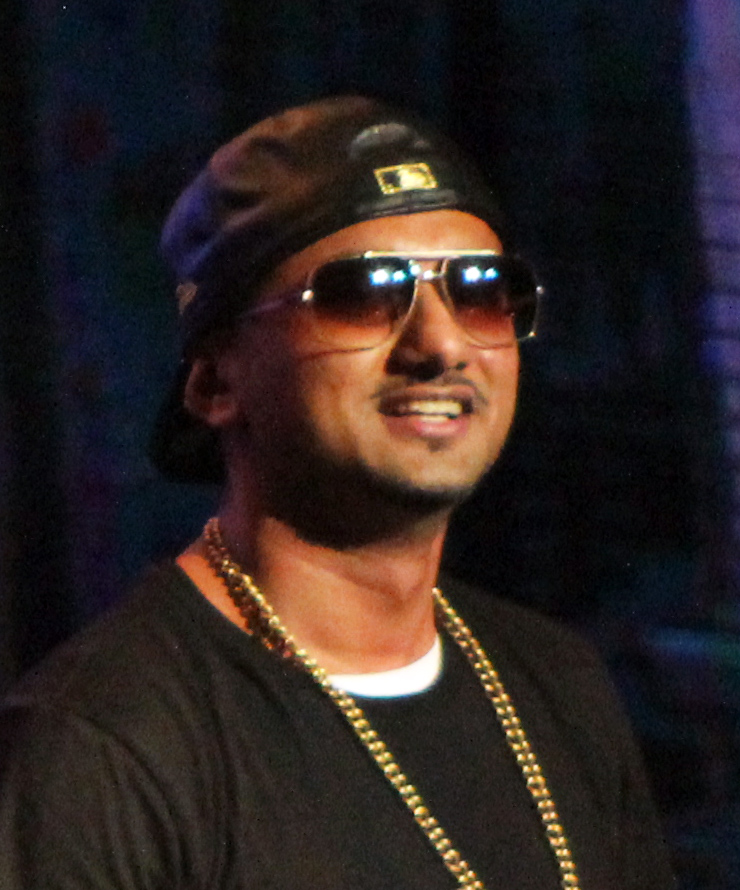
- Singh in Bristow, Virginia, US (2014)

Background information
- Born: Hirdesh Singh; 15 March 1983 (age 43); Karampura, Delhi, India
- Origin: Punjab, India
- Genres: pop; EDM; bhangra; pop rap; R&B
- Occupations: singer; record producer; actor
- Years active: 2003–present
- Labels: T-Series; Zee Music Company; Speed Records
- Spouse: Shalini Talwar (m. 2011–2023)

Hirdesh Singh (born 15 March 1983), known professionally as Yo Yo Honey Singh, is an Indian singer, music producer and actor. He commenced his career as a hip-hop music producer in 2003, working as a session and recording artist within the underground music scene until the release of his debut studio album, International Villager.

== Early life ==
Hirdesh Singh was born on 15 March 1983 in the residential district of Karampura in West Delhi to a Sikh family from Hoshiarpur, Punjab. He studied at the Guru Nanak Public School in New Delhi.

== Career ==
=== Music ===
In 2006, Singh collaborated with singer Ashok Masti for the song "Glassy", marking his debut in the music industry.

During the early 2010s, Singh became popular in the Indian music industry, performing at numerous college festivals such as Ansal Institute of Technology and Ramjas College in Delhi.

By 2012, Singh set a record for the highest fee ever paid to an artist for a Bollywood song, reportedly receiving ₹7 million rupees (US$84,000) for tracks in the movies Cocktail and Mastan. He sang his first Hindi song in Mastan.

His popularity surged on YouTube with two of his videos— "Brown Rang" and "High Heels" (a collaboration with Jaz Dhami)—ranking among the top trending videos that year. Following the success of "Brown Rang", Singh released "Angreji Beat" in collaboration with Gippy Grewal. This track further solidified his presence in the music industry, becoming a party anthem across India. In 2013, Singh released another song, "Blue Eyes". The song, known for its sleek production and catchy hook, became an instant hit, showcasing his versatility in blending Hindi and English lyrics with an international sound. In 2014, Singh released his second album, Desi Kalakaar, with the eponymous title track and "Love Dose".

The title track featured Bollywood actress Sonakshi Sinha in its accompanying music video. He released the song "Birthday Bash" in February 2015.

In 2024, Singh launched his album Glory, featuring 18 tracks, including "Millionaire", "Rap God", and "Jatt Mehkma". This album marked a significant milestone in his career and received widespread acclaim, with multiple songs trending on music streaming platforms.

In December 2024, a documentary titled Yo Yo Honey Singh: Famous was released on Netflix. The documentary received mixed reviews.

In 2025, Honey Singh announced his Millionaire India Tour in association with Aaj Tak, where he visited 10 cities across India, namely, Mumbai, Lucknow, Delhi, Indore, Pune, Ahmedabad, Bengaluru, Chandigarh, Jaipur, and Kolkata. In the same year, he released his fifth studio album, 51 Glorious Days, comprising 51 songs, featuring guest appearances from AP Dhillon, Bohemia, Nora Fatehi, Alfaaz, Jyoti Nooran among others. It was accompanied by the release of the music video of the song "Mafia", from the album. He further announced his My Story: India Tour in association with NDTV, where he scheduled his visit for 10 cities.

=== Bollywood ===
His debut song in Bollywood films was "Shakal Pe Mat Ja", featuring Gagan Sidhu. Singh charged Rs. 7 million for a song in the film Mastan. This was the largest amount paid to a singer in Bollywood then, making Singh one of the highest-paid musical artists in Bollywood.

In February 2015 he released the songs "Birthday Bash" with Alfaaz, followed by songs in films including Gabbar Is Back and Bhaag Johnny.

Mumbai Saga's first song "Shor Machega", was released on 28 February 2021. It was composed by Singhsta, with lyrics and vocals by Singhsta and Hommie Dilliwala.

=== Acting ===
Singh made his acting debut with a cameo appearance in Baljit Singh Deo's Punjabi film Mirza - The Untold Story (2012), performing the role of Deesha, a mad gangster. The role won him the PTC Punjabi Film Award for Best Male Debut. The following year, Singh appeared in another Punjabi film, this time in a comedy by Amit Prasher, Tu Mera 22 Main Tera 22, as Rolly, a childish and spoilt brat, alongside Amrinder Gill.

== Personal life ==
On 23 January 2011, Singh married Shalini Talwar, a longtime friend. In November 2023, the couple were divorced after Talwar claimed she had suffered domestic violence. Singh denied the allegations, and Talwar withdrew them after the divorce was settled.

In his Netflix documentary, Singh disclosed that he suffers from bipolar disorder. In a 2026 interview, he revealed that he wears a wig during his public appearances, due to the hair loss he faced while he was consuming medications for his condition.

== Controversies ==
Singh's work has been criticised as being vulgar, misogynist, offensive and racist promoting violence against women along with promoting alcohol abuse and drugs and a bad influence on youth. There have been reactions in print to Singh, such as from Annie Zaidi, who wrote "An Open Letter to Honey Singh" in January 2013, and Sandipan Sharma, who wrote "Thanks for the crassness: An open letter to Honey Singh from a parent" in July 2014.

In the aftermath of the 2012 Delhi gang rape case, a song "Main Hoon Balatkari" (lit. 'I Am A Rapist') became popular in the city, its lyrics glorifying rape. The song was attributed to Singh, although he denied having sung or written the song. A first information report (FIR) was lodged against Singh for the song's lyrics, and a group of social activists filed an online petition demanding cancellation of his New Year performance at a Gurgaon hotel. After the campaign, Singh's New Year concert was cancelled by the hotel. A case was dismissed by Chandigarh High Court who found no proof that Singh was its singer.

Singh's song "Party All Night" from Akshay Kumar's 2013 film Boss was at the centre of a controversy for a "vulgar" word in its lyrics, with a petition filed to stay the release of the film until the word or the song was removed. Producers of the movie submitted a petition in Delhi High Court claiming to have "muted" the word. Singh denied that the word was vulgar, saying that people "must have heard it wrongly".

In 2014, Singh and fellow rapper Raftaar were in dispute over whether Raftaar should receive credit for the lyrics of the song "Yeh Fugly Fugly Kya Hai".

In 2015, a student of St. Stephen's College went viral for a rap that parodied Singh's problematic songs from a feminist perspective.

In 2021, Honey Singh's wife Shalini Talwar filed a case against him in Tis Hazari Court for domestic violence. Talwar accused Singh of "numerous incidents of physical abuse, verbal, mental abuse and emotional abuse", and accused him of adultery.

In 2025, a notice was sent for the singer to appear on 11 August 2025, by Punjab State Women's Commission for lyrics on his 2024 album Glory, in the track "Millionaire" being perceived as derogatory towards women. A report was demanded from the Director General of Police (DGP). Chairperson Raj Lali Gill demanded an investigation by the Punjab DGP and sought to ban such content.

Following a plea filed by Hindu Shakti Dal in March 2026, Singh's 2006 collaboration with Badshah, titled "Volume 1", was ordered a takedown by the Delhi High Court, from all social media and music streaming platforms, citing its derogatory nature towards women.

== Selected discography ==
=== Albums ===
Title	Album details
International Villager	Released: 11 November 2011; Label: Speed Records
Desi Kalakaar	Released: 26 September 2014; Label: T-Series
Honey 3.0	Released: 15 March 2024; Label: Zee Music Company
Glory	Released: 26 August 2024; Label: T-Series
51 Glorious Days	Released: 26 September 2025; Label: T-Series

=== Singles ===
Year	Track	Artist(s)	Notes
2012	"Brown Rang"	Yo Yo Honey Singh	
2015	"Dheere Dheere"	Yo Yo Honey Singh	Music video featuring Hrithik Roshan and Sonam Kapoor
2021	"Saiyaan Ji"	Yo Yo Honey Singh and Neha Kakkar	
2021	"Kanta Laga"	Tony Kakkar ft. Yo Yo Honey Singh and Neha Kakkar	

=== Appearances on film soundtracks ===
Year	Movie	Song	Singer(s)	Music director(s)
2011	Desi Boyz	"Subhah Hone Na De"	Mika Singh, Shefali Alvares, Yo Yo Honey Singh	Pritam
2012	Cocktail	"Main Sharabi"	Yo Yo Honey Singh, Javed Bashir	Pritam
2012	Cocktail	"Angrezi Beat"	Yo Yo Honey Singh, Gippy Grewal	Yo Yo Honey Singh
2012	Son of Sardaar	"Rani Tu Mein Raja"	Mika Singh, Bhavya Pandit, Yo Yo Honey Singh	Himesh Reshammiya
2012	Luv Shuv Tey Chicken Khurana	"Kikli Kalerdi"	Amit Trivedi, Pinky Maidasani and Yo Yo Honey Singh	Amit Trivedi
2012	Khiladi 786	"Lonely Lonely"	Himesh Reshammiya, Yo Yo Honey Singh and Hamsika Iyer	Himesh Reshammiya
2013	Race 2	"Party on My Mind"	KK, Shefali Alvares, Yo Yo Honey Singh	Pritam
2013	Mere Dad Ki Maruti	"Punjabiyan Di Battery"	Mika Singh, Yo Yo Honey Singh	Sachin Gupta
2013	Bajatey Raho	"Kudi Tu Butter"	Yo Yo Honey Singh	Yo Yo Honey Singh & Jaidev Kumar
2013	Chennai Express	"Lungi Dance" – The 'Thalaiva(r)' Tribute	Yo Yo Honey Singh	Yo Yo Honey Singh
2013	Boss	"Boss"	Yo Yo Honey Singh, Meet Bros Anjjan	Meet Bros Anjjan
2013	Boss	"Party All Night"	Yo Yo Honey Singh	
2014	Yaariyan	"ABCD"	Benny Dayal, Shefali Alvares & Yo Yo Honey Singh	Pritam
2014	Yaariyan	"Sunny Sunny"	Neha Kakkar, Yo Yo Honey Singh	Yo Yo Honey Singh
2014	Dedh Ishqiya	"Horn OK Please"	Honey Singh, Sukhwinder Singh	Vishal Bhardwaj
2014	Ragini MMS 2	"Chaar Botal Vodka"	Yo Yo Honey Singh	Yo Yo Honey Singh
2014	Bhoothnath Returns	"Party with the Bhoothnath"	Yo Yo Honey Singh	Yo Yo Honey Singh
2014	Fugly	"Ye Fugly Fugly Kya Hai"	Yo Yo Honey Singh	Yo Yo Honey Singh
2014	Fugly	Banjaare	Yo Yo Honey Singh	Yo Yo Honey Singh
2014	Kick	"Yaar Naa Miley"	Yo Yo Honey Singh, Jasmine Sandlas	Yo Yo Honey Singh
2014	Singham Returns	"Aata Majhi Satakli"	Yo Yo Honey Singh, Mamta Sharma, Nitu Choudhry	Yo Yo Honey Singh
2014	The Shaukeens	"Alcoholic"	Yo Yo Honey Singh	Yo Yo Honey Singh
2014	The Shaukeens	"Manali Trance"	Neha Kakkar, Yo Yo Honey Singh	Yo Yo Honey Singh
2015	Dilliwali Zaalim Girlfriend	"Birthday Bash"	Alfaaz and Yo Yo Honey Singh	Yo Yo Honey Singh
2015	Gabbar is Back	"Aao Raja"	Yo Yo Honey Singh, Neha Kakkar	Yo Yo Honey Singh
2015	Bhaag Johnny	"Aankhon Aankhon"	Yo Yo Honey Singh	Yo Yo Honey Singh
2016	Ki & Ka	"High Heels" (Remake)	Jaz Dhami, Yo Yo Honey Singh, Aditi Singh Sharma	Meet Bros, Yo Yo Honey Singh
2018	Sonu Ke Titu Ki Sweety	"Dil Chori"	Honey Singh, Simar Kaur, Singhsta	Yo Yo Honey Singh
2018	Sonu Ke Titu Ki Sweety	"Chhote Chhote Peg"	Yo Yo Honey Singh, Neha Kakkar, Navraj Hans	Yo Yo Honey Singh
2018	Mitron	"This Party Is Over Now"	Yo Yo Honey Singh	Yo Yo Honey Singh
2018	Loveyatri	"Rang Taari"	Dev Negi, Yo Yo Honey Singh	Tanishk Bagchi
2018	Baazaar	"Billionaire"	Yo Yo Honey Singh, Simar Kaur, Singhsta	Yo Yo Honey Singh
2019	Jabariya Jodi	"Khadke Glassy"	Yo Yo Honey Singh, Ashok Masti, Jyotica Tangri	Tanishk Bagchi, Ashok Masti, Ramji Gulati
2019	Jabariya Jodi	Glassy 2.0	Yo Yo Honey Singh, Ashok Masti, Jyotica Tangri	Tanishk Bagchi, Ashok Masti, Ramji Gulati
2019	Jhootha Kahin Ka	"Funk Love"	Yo Yo Honey Singh	Yo Yo Honey Singh
2019	Marjaavaan	"Peeyu Datke"	Yo Yo Honey Singh, Ritu Pathak	Yo Yo Honey Singh
2019	Pagalpanti	"Thumka"	Yo Yo Honey Singh	Yo Yo Honey Singh
2020	Chhalaang	"Care Ni Karda"	Yo Yo Honey Singh, Sweetaj Brar	Yo Yo Honey Singh
2021	Mumbai Saga	"Shor Machega"	Yo Yo Honey Singh featuring Hommie Dilliwala and Shruti Sinha	Yo Yo Honey Singh
2022	Bhool Bhulaiyaa 2	"De Taali"	Yo Yo Honey Singh, Armaan Malik, Shashwat Singh	Pritam
2023	Selfiee	"Kudi Chamkeeli"	Yo Yo Honey Singh	Yo Yo Honey Singh
2023	Kisi Ka Bhai Kisi Ki Jaan	"Let's Dance Chotu Motu"	Yo Yo Honey Singh, Devi Sri Prasad, Salman Khan, Neha Bhasin	Devi Sri Prasad
2023	Yaariyan 2	"Blue Hai Paani Paani"	Arijit Singh, Neha Kakkar	Yo Yo Honey Singh, Khaalif
2023	Yaariyan 2	"Sunny Sunny 2.0"	Yo Yo Honey Singh, Neha Kakkar	Yo Yo Honey Singh, Khaalif
2023	Yaariyan 2	"Kho Sa Gaya Hoon"	Manan Bhardwaj, Yo Yo Honey Singh, Neha Kakkar	Manan Bhardwaj, Yo Yo Honey Singh
2024	Khel Khel Mein	"Hauli Hauli"	Guru Randhawa, Yo Yo Honey Singh, Neha Kakkar	Guru Randhawa
2025	Fateh	"Hitman"	Yo Yo Honey Singh	Yo Yo Honey Singh
2025	Raid 2	"Money Money"	Yo Yo Honey Singh	Yo Yo Honey Singh
2025	Housefull 5	"Laal Pari"	Yo Yo Honey Singh, Simar Kaur	Yo Yo Honey Singh
2025	De De Pyaar De 2	"Jhoom Sharabi"	Yo Yo Honey Singh	Yo Yo Honey Singh
2026	King	"Nepali Navigator"	Yo Yo Honey Singh, Lil Golh	Yo Yo Honey Singh

=== Production discography ===
Year	Album	Artist
2009	The Next Level	Diljit Dosanjh
2011	Alfaaz – The Boy Next Door	Alfaaz
2014	Desi Kalakaar	Honey Singh

== Filmography ==
=== Movies ===
As an actor
Year	Film	Role	Language	Notes
2012	Mirza - The Untold Story	Deesha	Punjabi	
2013	Tu Mera 22 Main Tera 22	Rolly	Punjabi	Hindi Remake of Partner
2014	The Xpose	Kenny Damania	Hindi	
2016	Zorawar	Agent Zorawar Singh	Punjabi	

=== Television ===
Year	Show	Channel	Role
2014	India's Raw Star	Star Plus	Judge

== Awards ==
- 2010 PTC Punjabi Best Music Director 2010 for the song "Desi Daroo"
- 2011 PTC Punjabi Best Music Director 2011 for album The Folkstar
- 2012 PTC Punjabi Best Music Director 2012 for album I.V. (International Villager)
- 2012 BritAsia TV Music Awards 2012 – Best International Act
- 2012 UK Asian Music Awards Best International Album 2012 for Album album I.V. (International Villager)
- 2012 PTC Punjabi Film Award – Best Music Director 2012 for Mirza – The Untold Story
- 2012 PTC Punjabi Film Award – Best Debut (Male) for Mirza – The Untold Story
- 2013 MTV VMAI Awards – Best Indie Artist (male) 2013 for the song "Brown Rang"
- 2013 MTV Europe Music Awards – Best India Act 2013 for "Bring Me Back"
- 2013 BIG Star Entertainment Awards – Singh was co-winner of Most Entertaining Singer (Male), and "Lungi Dance" was nominated as Most Entertaining Song.
- 2014 Zee Cine Awards 2014 for International Icon Male
- 2014 Stardust Awards – Best Music Director for Yaariyan
- 2014 MTV Europe Music Awards – Best India Act 2014
- 2016 Hindustan Times India's Most Stylish Awards – Most Stylish Singer
- 2018 Mirchi Music Awards – Listener's Choice Album of the Year for Sonu Ke Titu Ki Sweety and Listener's Choice Song of the Year for "Dil Chori"
- 2019 IIFA Award for Best Music Director for Best Performance by a music director for Sonu Ke Titu Ki Sweety

== See also ==
- Desi Kalakaar
- An Open Letter to Honey Singh
