= Angoor (1982 film) =

1982 Indian film by Gulzar

- Poster
- Directed by: Gulzar
- Written by: Gulzar
- Based on: The Comedy of Errors by William Shakespeare
- Produced by: Jai Singh
- Starring: Sanjeev Kumar; Moushumi Chatterjee; Deepti Naval; Deven Verma; Aruna Irani
- Cinematography: M. Sampat
- Edited by: Waman Bhonsle; Gurudutt Shirali
- Music by: R. D. Burman
- Production company: A. R. Movies
- Release date: 5 March 1982
- Country: India
- Language: Hindi

Angoor (transl. Grapes) is a 1982 Indian Hindi-language comedy film. Starring Sanjeev Kumar and Deven Verma in double roles, it is directed by Gulzar. The film was a remake of the 1963 Bengali-language comedy film Bhranti Bilas that is based on Ishwar Chandra Vidyasagar's Bengali novel by the same name, which itself is based on Shakespeare's play The Comedy of Errors. Do Dooni Chaar 1968 film is also remake from the same film and was also adapted by Rohit Shetty as Cirkus. All characters are naïve and destiny plays the main role in bringing all characters to one place. Most of the other films are generally based on false characters and deliberately make false statements to fool others.

== Plot ==
The film is about two pairs of identical twins separated at birth and how their lives go haywire when they meet in adulthood.

Raj Tilak (Utpal Dutt) and his wife (Shammi) are on a trip with their twin sons, both of whom they call Ashok. Since they look the same, they should be called the same, is Mr Tilak's reasoning. As fate would have it, they adopt another set of twins, both of whom they call Bahadur. An unfortunate accident then divides the family, leaving each parent with one child out of each pair of twins.

A few years later, Ashok (Sanjeev Kumar) is married to Sudha (Moushumi Chatterjee) and Bahadur (Deven Verma) is married to Prema (Aruna Irani). They all stay together with Sudha's younger sister Tanu (Deepti Naval). Into their lives enter the other Ashok, a detective novel aficionado, and Bahadur, a bhang (an edible preparation made from the leaves of the cannabis plant) lover. Now there are two Ashoks and two Bahadurs in the same city. This is more than their families, the Jeweller, the Taxi Driver and the Inspector can handle.

Sudha has been demanding a necklace from Ashok 1, who angrily rushes out to go and get it. Meanwhile, the other Ashok has arrived with other Bahadur and is staying in the hotel. When Ashok goes to check on the vineyards in the city, he decides to head to the market, where Bahadur 1 (married to Prema) is shopping for radish. A hilarious encounter occurs, where Ashok slaps Bahadur 1, for not staying at the hotel, and Bahadur 1 is confused as his master never smoked. Later, Ashok 2 and Bahadur 2 head to a music concert, where Tanu is performing. She sees them, and forcibly takes them home, thinking they’re the first pair. Whereas, Ashok 1 is out late to the goldsmith’s shop to ask when he’d get the necklace. Ashok 2 and Bahadur 2 are convinced that this is all a scheme, and Bahadur secretly puts Bhang in the snacks that Prema made, causing Sudha, Tanu, Prema, and hilariously, Ashok and Bahadur (they were forced to eat it) to fall asleep, with Bahadur singing a song about how terrified he is. Meanwhile, Ashok 1 and Bahadur 1 come back to find the doors locked, and Bahadur 2 is forced to imitate a dog to chase them away. The next day, Ashok 2 and Bahadur 2 somehow get out by obtaining the key to the gate, and Ashok is heading to the hotel, when the goldsmith’s assistant sees him and thinking him to be Ashok 1, gives him the box containing Sudha’s necklace. Meanwhile, Ashok 1 and Bahadur 1, who both spent the night at a friend’s place, head to the goldsmith, who tells Ashok that his assistant gave the box to him. Ashok 1, getting frustrated, heads to the police station and report this. He tells Bahadur 1, to buy a rope and tell Sudha to hang herself with it (out of frustration). Meanwhile, Bahadur 2, who somehow comes to the police station, is told by Ashok 1 to send a message to Sudha.

== Cast ==
- Sanjeev Kumar in a double role as twin brothers Ashok Tilak and Ashok Tilak.^{[A]}
- Moushmi Chatterjee as Sudha Tilak, Ashok's wife
- Deepti Naval as Tanu, Sudha's sister
- Deven Verma in a double role as twin brothers Bahadur and Bahadur.^{[A]}
- Aruna Irani as Prema, Bahadur's wife
- Yunus Parvez as Mansoor Miyan, Chhedilal's worker
- C. S. Dubey as Chhedilal, a jeweller
- T. P. Jain as Ganeshilal, a diamond merchant
- Padma Chavan as Alka, Ashok's friend
- Rammohan Sharma as Taxi Driver
- Shammi as Ashok's mother
- Utpal Dutt as Raj Tilak, Ashok's father (Cameo)
- Raj Kumar Kapoor as Inspector Sinha
- Arjun Chakraborty as an office assistant under Ashok Tilak
- Kamaldeep as 'Angoor' landlord
- Raj Mata as Kashibai
- Zafar as the Tangewala

== Soundtrack ==
Song	Singer	Raga
"Hothon Pe Beeti Baat"	Asha Bhosle	
"Roz Roz Daali Daali"	Asha Bhosle	Kalyan
"Preetam Aan Milo"	Sapan Chakraborty	

== Awards and nominations ==
30th Filmfare Awards:

Won

- Best Comedian – Deven Verma

Nominated

- Best Actor – Sanjeev Kumar

== Home media ==
The DVD version of the film was released by IndiaWeekly under its own label.

== See also ==
- The Comedy of Errors § Adaptations
- Bhranti Bilas, 1869 play by Indian writer Ishwar Chandra Vidyasagar, based on Shakespeare's The Comedy of Errors
  - Bhranti Bilas, 1963 Indian Bengali-language comedy film by Manu Sen, based on Vidyasagar's play
  - Do Dooni Chaar (1968 film), 1968 Indian Hindi-language comedy film by Debu Sen, remake of the 1963 film; itself remade into the 1982 film Angoor
  - Double Di Trouble, 2014 Indian Punjabi-language film by Smeep Kang remake of the 1982 film Angoor
  - Cirkus (film), 2022 Indian Hindi-language comedy film by Rohit Shetty, remake of the 1982 film Angoor

== Notes ==
^A Both twins were given the same name at birth.
