= Cirkus (film) =

2022 Indian film by Rohit Shetty

- Theatrical release poster
- Directed by: Rohit Shetty
- Screenplay by: Yunus Sajawal
- Dialogues by: Farhad Samji; Sanchit Bedre; Vidhi Ghadgaonkar
- Based on: The Comedy of Errors by William Shakespeare
- Produced by: Rohit Shetty; Bhushan Kumar; Krishan Kumar
- Starring: Ranveer Singh; Pooja Hegde; Jacqueline Fernandez; Varun Sharma
- Cinematography: Jomon T. John
- Edited by: Bunty Nagi
- Music by: Score: Amar Mohile; Songs: Devi Sri Prasad; Hiten-Badshah; Lijo George-DJ Chetas
- Production companies: Rohit Shetty Pictures; T-Series Films
- Distributed by: Reliance Entertainment
- Release date: 23 December 2022
- Running time: 138 minutes
- Country: India
- Language: Hindi
- Budget: ₹150 crore
- Box office: est. ₹61.47 crore

Cirkus is a 2022 Indian Hindi-language period comedy-drama film directed and produced by Rohit Shetty. The film is jointly produced by Rohit Shetty Pictures and T-Series. The film stars Ranveer Singh and Varun Sharma in dual roles alongside Pooja Hegde, Jacqueline Fernandez, Johny Lever, and Sanjay Mishra. In the film, two sets of identical twins mixed up at birth encounter each other as adults.

Cirkus is a spin-off to 2017 film Golmaal Again and an adaptation of the 1963 Bengali film Bhranti Bilash, which itself was based on William Shakespeare's play The Comedy of Errors, and marks the final collaboration to date between Shetty and Farhad Samji, the latter of whom did not return to work on Shetty's subsequent Cop Universe projects Indian Police Force and Singham Again. Principal photography for the film began in November 2020 at Mumbai and also took place in Ooty.

Cirkus was released theatrically on 23 December 2022. The film was panned by critics and audiences, and became a major commercial failure.

== Plot ==
In 1944, Dr. Roy Jamnadas, who is working on the theory of nature vs nurture, separates two sets of identical twins he finds at the doorstep of the orphanage he runs and gives them up for adoption to two different families, based in two different cities of India. One twin from each pair is given to a couple in Ooty and the other twin from the pair to a couple in Bangalore. Coincidentally, both the couples name the twins Roy and Joy, after Dr. Roy and his own adoptive brother Joy. Roy 1 and Joy 1's father runs a circus and after his death, they both take up the responsibility of running the circus. Roy 2 and Joy 2's father is a wealthy industrialist. Roy 1 has a strange connection with electricity and electric currents do not affect him. He uses this ability to show tricks at the circus and becomes famously known as 'Electric Man'. Elsewhere, Roy 2 receives electric shocks whenever Roy 1 comes into contact with electricity.

The story then moves forward 30 years. Roy 1's wife, Mala, cannot conceive and wishes to adopt a child from the Jamnadas Orphanage, but Roy 1 is against the idea. Roy 2 is in love with Bindu but her father, Rai Bahadur, is skeptical about him as he has seen Roy 1 with Mala in Ooty and has mistaken him for Roy 2, thinking that he is cheating on Bindu. Roy 2 and Joy 2 come to Ooty to buy a tea estate and there is a lot of confusion and misunderstanding as people mistake them for the other pair of twins. Three robbers - Momo, Mango and Chikki - are after them to rob their money. They back off when Roy 2 gives them electric shocks and their boss, Polson Dada, later comes to take revenge. They also come across Nagmani, the shady cab driver and Bagheera, a dacoit turned hotel owner. Roy 2 thinks they are all part of a criminal gang who want to rob them, and when they happen to come across Mala, they think that she is the leader of the gang.

Roy 1 decides to gift a diamond necklace to Mala but the jeweler mistakenly gives it to Roy 2, creating further confusion. Moreover, Rai Bahadur is now convinced that Roy 2 is married to Mala. On hearing this, Bindu threatens to end her relationship with him, not knowing that Mala is actually Roy 1's wife. All the confusion is cleared when both pairs of twins come face to face at the circus and Dr. Jamnadas reveals the truth to them and his real intention behind separating them. They all reconcile with Roy 1 and Mala finally adopting a child from the orphanage while Roy 2 and Bindu plan to get married soon.

== Cast ==
- Ranveer Singh in dual roles as
  - Roy Chauhan aka Electric Man
  - Roy Shenoy
- Pooja Hegde as Mala, Roy Chauhan's wife
- Jacqueline Fernandez as Bindu, Roy Shenoy's girlfriend
- Varun Sharma in dual roles as
  - Joy Chauhan
  - Joy Shenoy
- Murali Sharma as Dr. Roy Jamnadas
- Sanjay Mishra as Rai Bahadur, Bindu's father
- Ashwini Kalsekar as Shakuntala Shenoy, Roy Shenoy and Joy Shenoy's mother
- Johnny Lever as Polson Dada
- Siddharth Jadhav as Momo
- Mukesh Tiwari as Daaku Bagheera
- Radhika Bangia as Lily
- Vrajesh Hirjee as Naag mani, a taxi driver
- Tiku Talsania as Veljibhai, a jeweller
- Vijay Patkar as Shankar
- Brijendra Kala as Yusuf
- Anil Charanjeett as Prem
- Uday Tikekar as Joy Jamnadas; Tikekar reprises his role from Golmaal Again
- Sulabha Arya as Chachi
- Umakant Patil as Chikki
- Ashish Warang as Mango
- Nikitin Dheer as Dev Chauhan, Roy Chauhan and Joy Chauhan's late father (cameo appearance)
- Deepika Padukone as Vrindama (special appearance in song "Current Laga Re")
- Krishna Saajnani as Travelling ticket examiner (TTE) at Ooty Station

== Production ==
=== Development ===
Rohit Shetty had originally planned to team up with Shah Rukh Khan for a remake of the 1982 film, Angoor. After the 2011 blockbuster Singham, Shetty had begun writing the script of the film but left it half-finished. In 2015, Shetty said "We always plan to make Angoor but we ended up making Chennai Express and then Dilwale. We will definitely make Angoor but I don't know when." During COVID-19 lockdown in India, Shetty worked on developing the story further and narrated it to Ranveer Singh, who later confirmed for the film, marking their third feature film collaboration after Simmba (2018) and Sooryavanshi (2021).

The film was produced by Rohit Shetty Productionz and T-Series Films. The officially announced the project titled Cirkus on 19 October 2020. Since the film is a comedy of error that results from mistaken identity due to the double role of two characters in the film, makers decided to set the film in an era that was devoid of mobile phones and all other modern gadgets. After contemplating on the time frame, they finally zeroed in on 1967 as the era to be recreated in Cirkus. In early November 2020 before the film entering to production, Shetty booked entire Mehboob Studio, Mumbai for the film shoot and started the set construction.

=== Casting ===
Ranveer Singh was reported to play double role in the film. In mid-October 2020, it was confirmed that Pooja Hegde and Jacqueline Fernandez will play the female leads in the film, in the maiden collaboration with both Shetty and Singh. Later, Varun Sharma was confirmed for playing double role in the film. Johnny Lever was also cast in an important role.

=== Filming ===
Principal photography began on 17 November 2020 in Mumbai. Pooja Hegde wrapped the first schedule on 6 December 2020. In late-December 2020, Singh glimpses from the sets of the film. Deepika Padukone shot a special dance number in mid-February 2021. Final schedule of the film began on 27 March 2021. Few Russian artists with elaborate outfits were spotted outside the sets and their looks included coloured wigs and extravagant headgears. Film production was halted during the final schedule in April 2021 as shootings were stopped in Mumbai, due to the second wave of COVID-19, and the film's vanity vans were given to police for the COVID duty. The last schedule resumed in Ooty around November 2021 and was completed within December 2021. Some patchwork also took place in July 2022. The entire filming for Cirkus was wrapped up in November 2022.

=== Post-production ===
Post-production of the film began simultaneously with the wrapping-up and continuation of film production. Editing and VFX works began in February 2022. The final copy of the film was ready in late-November, and was submitted to the Central Board of Film Certification (CBFC) next month. On 16 December 2022, the film received a U/A certificate from the Censor Board, with a finalized runtime of 138 minutes.

== Music ==
The score is composed by Amar Mohile and the songs were written by Devi Sri Prasad, Badshah and Lijo George-DJ Chetas. The first single titled "Current Laga Re" was released on 8 December 2022. The second single "Sun Zara", sung by Papon and Shreya Ghoshal released on 16 December 2022. The third single "Aashiqui", sung by Badshah and Amrita Singh released on 21 December. The score was composed by Amar Mohile.

== Release ==
=== Theatrical ===
Cirkus was theatrically released on 23 December 2022. It was initially scheduled for 31 December 2021, during New Year, and then on 15 July 2022, but were unable due to production delays via COVID-19 pandemic. In May 2022, the new release date with first official poster was announced — 23 December 2022, thus eyeing Christmas Eve.

=== Home media ===
The film's digital rights were acquired by Netflix. The film started streaming on Netflix from 17 February 2023.

== Reception ==
=== Box office ===
Cirkus collected ₹6.25 crore in India on its opening day. In its first week, the film made ₹28.20 crore net in India. As of 19 January 2023, the film has collected ₹42.44 crore in India and ₹19.03 crore overseas for a worldwide total of ₹61.47 crore.

=== Critical response ===
Cirkus was panned by critics and audiences. On the review aggregator website Rotten Tomatoes, 0% of 13 critics' reviews are positive, with an average rating of 3.4/10.

Bollywood Hungama rated it with 2 out of 5 stars and wrote, "Rohit Shetty's direction is decent. The biggest strength of his execution is that he doesn't let the film turn confusing though there are far too many characters, including the ones that look similar. He has handled a few comic moments in an entertaining manner. He goes on a high with the scenes of Momo (Siddharth Jadhav) and also Rai Bahadur." NDTV's reviewer felt that, "Cirkus have same drawback as other Bollywood films have nowadays, its seems that it have no respect for audience, Cirkus is abysmally bad film, it may remind audience Awara (1951) of Raj Kapoor', referring to its upbringing theme similar Awara. Ranveer Singh's both roles are insipid, this film's comic gags are pathetically unfunny, pointing on technical aspects he wrote that, its gaudy colour pallets made to appear film's real background like painted one." Maharashtra Times' Abhishek Khude rated it by 2/5, wrote 'The atmosphere, background in this film looked fake, it have theme of Golmaal Again (2017), Singh did acting in his typical one tone, Shetty tried to generate humour by actor's wired body movements and tasteless dialogues, few scenes are humorous, probably kids will enjoy this picture. Shubhra Gupta of The Indian Express, rated it by 1.5/5, wrote 'Ranveer Singh-Rohit Shetty film is surprisingly blah', Cirkus have cliche. She saw similar elements which Rohit Shetty everytime insert in his films to create humour from his multiple editions of Golmaal onwards, this film have over-the-top hilarity - Shetty style, in most part of it humour gags does not landed, some places it gives lectures to audience.

The Hindu's reviewer Anuj Kumar, wrote in his review article that, Rohit Shetty used lots of Bollywood clichés such as Kali pahadi, Rai Sahab but nothing created laughter, Jacqueline Fernandez- Puja Hegde looked like this film's glittering sets that shines a lot but add less worth, Cirkus is reckless ruckus in Ooty. Jadhav have prominent role, Fizzle generated when Lever appeared, he have 2-3 laugh moments the way Sanjay Mishra have in it. ABP News reviewer expressed that, Ranveer Singh, Varun Sharma's both characters are serious in this film and felt responsibility to generate humour was on Siddharth Jadhav- Sanjay Mishra, felt like supporting actors trying to do forced comedy, this film's plot is based on mistaken identity of two twin brother's set. The Quint's Pratiksha Mishra gave the film a rating of 1.5 out of 5 and wrote Cirkus's script is predictable, almost every part of this film have done before, such as trio of thieves (you already saw them in Golmaal 3 (2010) led by Pappi Bhai), the climax scene (similar to Phir Hera Pheri) bring forth just a few instances this film have a lot of these. Johny Lever, Varun Sharma and Sanjay Mishra etc. tried to make us laugh but writing is weak, it did not supported them. She criticized editing (due to slow motion scenes) and dialogues.

Calling the film predictable and unoriginal, Anna M. M. Vetticad of Firstpost wrote, "There's only so far that an actor's innate talent, nostalgia and kitschy images can take a film. Soon enough, Cirkus blurs the line between imitation and tribute, until the fun completely ceases." In her 1.75/5-rated review, she added a note of praise towards Shetty's continued use of the Tamil language, stating "Ironically, Rohit Shetty's much-lambasted comedies give us more authenticity in the use of language in southern Indian settings than most commercial Hindi cinema bothers with."

Vivek M.V. of Deccan Herald rated it by 1.5 out of 5 stars, wrote it is an ultra-boring film, opposite to its name it does not have any memorable circus acts, it have terrible jokes, gaudy colour tone which strain your eyes. "This is Rohit Shetty's worst film yet." Rediff rated the film 2 out of 5 stars and wrote, "There are some occasional jumping acts here and there by jokers, and then the protagonist just holds two cables and passes current through his body. WhatsApp jokes double up as movie dialogues." Ronak Kotecha of The Times of India gave the film 2 out of 5 stars and wrote, "Cirkus is a busy film filled with a battery of characters put together with a purpose to make us laugh, but is far from that. Entertaining the audience with slapstick comedy and drama is a tightrope that Rohit Shetty has successfully walked before but this time he seems to have tripped several times along the way."

Rating the film 2/5, India Today critic Tushar Joshi wrote, "The issue with Cirkus is that it feels outdated. Not because it's set in the 60s, but the formula is cliched. The VFX in some scenes looks amateurish and the music, unlike Shetty's previous films, is a big downer. There is no harm in making a mindless comedy, but for it to work you need to have some solid writing to back your effort." He added, "In Cirkus, the writing is average and the only time the film picks tempo is when the supporting cast delivers." Monika Rawal of Hindustan Times in her review said, Cirkus is an awful film, it have no comedy, Rohit Shetty appears to stuck in days of Golmaal (2006), there are endless characters in it and everyone did overacting, Ranveer Singh tried to be funny but his jokes did not land. Jacqueline is no better here and doesn't get to do much other than be just a prop adding some glam quotient. Tina Das of ThePrint wrote that this film have confusing narrative and it is extremely boring, Cirkus have too many characters and it created chaos thus became unfunny, Rohit Shetty's this film is one of the worst film of this year along with Liger and Heropanti 2.

== See also ==
- The Comedy of Errors § Adaptations
- Bhranti Bilas, 1869 play by Indian writer Ishwar Chandra Vidyasagar, based on Shakespeare's The Comedy of Errors
  - Bhranti Bilas, 1963 Indian Bengali-language comedy film by Manu Sen, based on Vidyasagar's play
  - Do Dooni Chaar (1968 film), 1968 Indian Hindi-language comedy film by Debu Sen, remake of the 1963 film; itself remade into the 1982 film Angoor
  - Angoor (1982 film), 1982 Indian Hindi-language comedy film by Gulzar, remade into the 2022 film Cirkus
  - Double Di Trouble, 2014 Indian Punjabi-language film by Smeep Kang remake of the 1982 film Angoor
