= Bhranti Bilas =

1963 Indian film by Manu Sen

- Directed by: Manu Sen
- Written by: Ishwar Chandra Vidyasagar
- Screenplay by: Bidhayak Bhattacharya (Dialogues)
- Based on: Comedy Of Errors by William Shakespeare
- Produced by: Uttam Kumar
- Starring: Uttam Kumar; Bhanu Bandopadhyay; Sabitri Chatterjee; Sandhya Roy
- Edited by: Haridas Mahalanabish
- Music by: Shyamal Mitra
- Production company: Uttam Kumar Films Pvt Ltd
- Distributed by: Chayabani Pvt Ltd
- Release date: 1963
- Running time: 102 Minutes
- Country: India
- Language: Bengali

Bhranti Bilash (transl. Comedy of Errors) is a 1963 Indian Bengali-language action comedy film directed by Manu Sen. Produced by Uttam Kumar under his banner of Uttam Kumar Films, the film is based on the 1869 play of the same name by Ishwar Chandra Vidyasagar, which is itself is an adaptation of William Shakespeare's The Comedy of Errors. It stars Kumar himself and Bhanu Bandopadhyay, both in dual roles, alongside Sabitri Chatterjee, Sandhya Roy, Chhaya Devi and Sabita Bose in another pivotal roles. The music of the film was composed by Shyamal Mitra.

In this movie, Uttam Kumar and Bhanu Bandyopadhyay were cast as a merchant and his servant, respectively. They visit a new town but don't know about the existence of their respective twin brothers and it ultimately leads to a series of confusions leading to a laugh riot.

Bhranti Bilas was remade in Hindi thrice as Do Dooni Char (1968), Angoor (1982) and Cirkus (2022), into Kannada as Ulta Palta (1997), into Telugu under the same name (1998) and into Tamil as Ambuttu Imbuttu Embuttu (2005).

== Plot ==
Although the original play was set in an unspecified, but distant past, the film relocates the story to modern day India. The film tells the story of a Bengali merchant from Kolkata and his servant who visit a small town for a business appointment, but, whilst there, are mistaken for a pair of locals, leading to much confusion.

== Cast ==
- Uttam Kumar as Chiranjib Chowdhury and Chiranjit Chowdhury
- Bhanu Bandopadhyay as Bhakti Kinkar and Shakti Kinkar
- Sabitri Chatterjee as Chandraprabhaa, Chiranjib's Wife
- Sandhya Roy as Bilashini, Chiranjib's sister-in-law, Chandraprabhaa's younger sister
- Sabita Bose as Aparajita
- Tarun Kumar as Money lender
- Chhaya Devi as Chiranjit & Chiranjib's Mother
- Bidhayak Bhattacharya as Bosupriyo

== Soundtrack ==
Bhranti Bilash

Soundtrack album by Shyamal Mitra
- Released: 1963
- Recorded: 1962
- Studio: Uttam Kumar Films Pvt Ltd
- Length: 0:11:32
- Label: Sa Re Ga Ma Pa
- Producer: Uttam Kumar

Shyamal Mitra chronology
Hashi Sudhu Hashi Noy (1963)	Bhranti Bilash (1963)	Deya Neya (1963)

All lyrics are written by Gauriprasanna Majumdar, Pulak Bandyopadhyay, Bidhayak Bhattacharya; all music is composed by Shyamal Mitra.

Songs
No.	Title	Playback	Length
1.	"Nachre Putul Nach"	Dhananjay Bhattacharya, Chorus	5:49
2.	"Sei Basaro Nei"	Shyamal Mitra	2:48
3.	"Tumi Ki Sei Tumi Nai"	Sandhya Mukherjee	2:55
Total length:			11:32

== Production ==
The story was written by Ishwar Chandra Vidyasagar which he adapted from The Comedy Of Errors written by William Shakespeare.

This was the third film produced by Uttam Kumar after the blockbuster iconic Harano Sur and Saptapadi which he produced along with Ajoy Kar. But this time he separated from Ajoy Kar and made his only own production and named Uttam Kumar Films Private Limited. In the film Uttam Kumar played dual role and this is the third film after Tasher Ghar in 1957 and iconic Jhinder Bandi in 1961 where Uttam playing in double role. Bhanu Bandopadhyay also played a dual role in the film.

== Remakes ==
Bhranti Bilas inspired several remakes in other languages. At first it got remade by Debu Sen into Hindi as Do Dooni Char in 1968, starring Kishore Kumar, Asit Sen and Tanuja. Later, another Hindi remake in 1982 was directed by the legendary lyricist and director Gulzar as Angoor, with Sanjeev Kumar and Deven Verma playing Kumar and Banerjee's roles respectively. In 1997, it was remade into Kannada as Ulta Palta, which itself later got remade into Telugu under the same title in 1998, and into Tamil as Ambuttu Imbuttu Embuttu in 2005.

In 2014, Subhash Ghai produced Double Di Trouble, a Punjabi remake of Bhranti Bilas, with Dharmendra replacing Kumar. Besides, for the third time into Hindi, Rohit Shetty remade it as Cirkus in 2022, where Ranveer Singh and Varun Sharma played the dual characters.

== See also ==
- The Comedy of Errors § Adaptations
- Bhranti Bilas, 1869 play by Indian writer Ishwar Chandra Vidyasagar, based on Shakespeare's The Comedy of Errors
  - Do Dooni Chaar (1968 film), 1968 Indian Hindi-language comedy film by Debu Sen, remake of the 1963 film; itself remade into the 1982 film Angoor
  - Angoor (1982 film), 1982 Indian Hindi-language comedy film by Gulzar, remake of the 1968 film Do Dooni Chaar
  - Double Di Trouble, 2014 Indian Punjabi-language film by Smeep Kang remake of the 1982 film Angoor
  - Cirkus (film), 2022 Indian Hindi-language comedy film by Rohit Shetty, remake of the 1982 film Angoor
