= Double Di Trouble =

2014 Indian Punjabi-language comedy film

- Double Di Trouble image showing participants
- Directed by: Smeep Kang
- Screenplay by: Smeep Kang; Vaibhav Suman; Shreya Shrivastava; Sanjay Chandwara
- Story by: Smeep Kang
- Based on: The Comedy of Errors by William Shakespeare
- Produced by: Ashok Ghai; Subhash Ghai
- Starring: Dharmendra; Gippy Grewal; Poonam Dhillon; Kulraj Randhawa; Minissha Lamba; Gurpreet Ghuggi; B.N. Sharma
- Cinematography: Kabir Lal
- Edited by: Manish More
- Music by: Jatinder Shah
- Production company: Mukta Arts
- Distributed by: White Hill Studios
- Release date: 29 August 2014
- Country: India
- Language: Punjabi

Double Di Trouble is a 2014 Indian Punjabi-language film directed by Smeep Kang, and starring Dharmendra, Gippy Grewal, Poonam Dhillon, Kulraj Randhawa, Minissha Lamba, and Gurpreet Ghuggi, alongside B.N. Sharma, Avtar Gill, and Karamjit Anmol. The film was first Punjabi film produced by Subhash Ghai. The music of the film is by Jatinder Shah. The film is a remake of Bengali film Bhranti Bilas (1963), which itself is based on Shakespeare's play The Comedy of Errors. It involves a father-son pair who discover their mirror images in a different city.

== Plot ==
The film is based on The Comedy of Errors, where Shakespeare's well-known play takes a Desi avatar when a father-son pair discovers their mirror images in a different city.

== Cast ==
- Dharmendra as Ajit and Manjit (Double role)
- Gippy Grewal as Fateh and Ekam (Double role)
- Poonam Dhillon as Pammi
- Kulraj Randhawa as Ekam's wife
- Minissha Lamba as Harleen
- Gurpreet Ghuggi as Gunni Mama
- B.N. Sharma as jeweller
- Avtar Gill as Inspector Saab
- Karamjit Anmol as Jain saab
- Rana Jung Bahadur
- Gurbachan Singh
- Neha Dhupia as Special appearance in song Lak Tunu Tunu
- Jazzy B as Himself (Special appearance)

== Soundtrack ==
Double Di Trouble

Soundtrack album by Jatinder Shah, Popsy & Rahat Fateh Ali Khan
- Released: 5 August 2014
- Genre: Feature film soundtrack
- Label: Venus Records & Tapes

Tracklist
No.	Title	Lyrics	Music	Singer(s)	Length
1.	"Double Di Trouble – Part 1"	Kumaar	Jatinder Shah	Ranjit Bawa	02:57
2.	"26 Bann Gayi"	Jagdev Maan	Popsy	Gippy Grewal & Jazzy B
3.	"Aisi Mulaqaat"	SM Sadiq	Rahat Fateh Ali Khan	Rahat Fateh Ali Khan	05:01
4.	"Dil Nachda Phire"	Happy Raikoti	Popsy	Gippy Grewal	03:27
5.	"Lak Tunu Tunu"	Kumaar	Meet Brothers	Gippy Grewal & Khushboo Grewal	04:11
6.	"Football – Part 1"	Veet Baljit	Pav Dharia	Gippy Grewal	04:24
7.	"26 Bann Gayi – Part 2"	Jagdev Maan	Popsy	Gippy Grewal	05:06
8.	"Double Di Trouble – Part 2"	Kumaar	Jatinder Shah	Kenny C	02:57
9.	"Football – Part 2"	Veet Baljit	Pav Dharia	Gippy Grewal	04:25

== Reception ==
Rohit Vats of Hindustan Times gave the film three out of five, writing, "The Comedy of Errors is not known for its in-depth conflict and it solely relies on quick witted reaction dialogues and hilarious situations. DDT does exactly this, and surprisingly it doesn't get dirty in the process like usual Punjabi movies. The presence of a veteran like Dharmendra at the helm of affairs helps the film immensely, and Gippy Grewal plays a second foil to him. Their comic timing is good and Dharamendra doesn't overshadow Gippy. Yes, the double role scenes look amateurish but overall DDT manages to tickle the funny bone."

== See also ==
- The Comedy of Errors § Adaptations
- Bhranti Bilas, 1869 play by Indian writer Ishwar Chandra Vidyasagar, based on Shakespeare's The Comedy of Errors
  - Bhranti Bilas, 1963 Indian Bengali-language comedy film by Manu Sen, based on Vidyasagar's play
  - Do Dooni Chaar (1968 film), 1968 Indian Hindi-language comedy film by Debu Sen, remake of the 1963 film; itself remade into the 1982 film Angoor
  - Angoor (1982 film), 1982 Indian Hindi-language comedy film by Gulzar, remake of the 1968 film Do Dooni Chaar
  - Cirkus (film), 2022 Indian Hindi-language comedy film by Rohit Shetty, remake of the 1982 film Angoor
