= Do Dooni Chaar (1968 film) =

1968 Indian Bollywood musical film

- Directed by: Debu Sen
- Written by: Gulzar
- Produced by: Bimal Roy
- Starring: Kishore Kumar; Asit Sen; Sudha Rani; Tanuja; Rashid Khan
- Music by: Hemant Kumar; Gulzar (lyrics)
- Release date: 1968
- Country: India
- Language: Hindi

Do Dooni Char (transl. Two twos are four) is a 1968 Indian Hindi-language musical, which is a remake of the 1963 Bengali film Bhranti Bilas based on the 1869 play of the same name by Ishwar Chandra Vidyasagar which was loosely based on William Shakespeare's The Comedy of Errors. The movie was remade by Gulzar as Angoor and was again adapted by Rohit Shetty as Cirkus.

== Plot ==
When a banker and his assistant head to a small town on a business trip, they are mistaken for a merchant and his servant who live in the town, causing much confusion.

== Cast ==
- Kishore Kumar as Sandeep
- Tanuja as Anju
- Surekha as Suman
- Asit Sen as Sevak
- Sudha Rani as Pyari
- Iftekhar as Police Inspector
- Rashid Khan
- Neetu Singh as Ban Devi

== Soundtrack ==
The music of the film was composed by Hemant Kumar, while lyrics were penned by Gulzar.

No.	Title	Singer(s)	Length
1.	"Bada Badmash Hai Yeh Dil"	Kishore Kumar
2.	"Hawaon Pe Likhdo Hawaon Ke Naam"	Kishore Kumar

== See also ==
- The Comedy of Errors § Adaptations
- Bhranti Bilas, 1869 play by Indian writer Ishwar Chandra Vidyasagar, based on Shakespeare's The Comedy of Errors
  - Bhranti Bilas, 1963 Indian Bengali-language comedy film by Manu Sen, based on Vidyasagar's play
  - Angoor (1982 film), 1982 Indian Hindi-language comedy film by Gulzar, remake of the 1968 film Do Dooni Chaar
  - Double Di Trouble, 2014 Indian Punjabi-language film by Smeep Kang remake of the 1982 film Angoor
  - Cirkus (film), 2022 Indian Hindi-language comedy film by Rohit Shetty, remake of the 1982 film Angoor
