= Iša Krejčí =

Czech musician

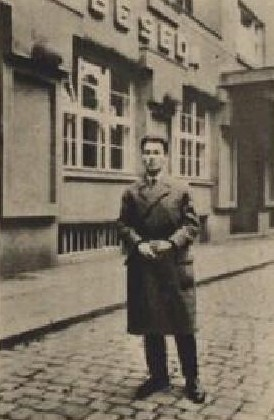
Krejčí, 1927

Iša František Krejčí (10 July 1904 – 6 March 1968) was a Czech neoclassicist composer, conductor and dramaturge.

== Life ==
Krejčí was born in Prague. He studied history and musicology at Charles University and concurrently piano playing with Albín Šíma and composition at the Prague Conservatory with Karel Boleslav Jirák and Vítězslav Novák and conducting with Václav Talich. He worked for the Slovak National Theatre in Bratislava in 1928–32, Czech Radio in 1934–45, Olomouc Opera in 1945–58, and Prague National Theatre since 1958.

As a conductor, he concentrated especially on the contemporary French repertoire and Igor Stravinsky's compositions. His reputation as a composer was established in 1925 with a Divertimento (or Cassation) for four wind instruments. With this work, based on Classical forms, he became known as a Czech representative of neoclassicism (Macek 2001).

He wrote the operas Antigone ("Antigona", after Sophocles, 1934) and An Uproar in Efes ("Pozdvižení v Efesu", after Shakespeare, 1943) as well as four symphonies. He died in Prague.

== Selected works ==
=== Stage works ===
- Small Ballet, to the theme of Pantomime by Vítězslav Nezval, also as a composition for chamber orchestra (1926)
- Pozdvižení v Efesu (An Uproar in Ephesus) Opera bouffe to the libretto by Josef Bachtík based on Shakespeare's Comedy of Errors (1939–43)
- Antigone (Antigona). A cantata for the stage after the tragedy by Sophocles (1933, rewritten 1959–62)
- Darkness (Temno). Scenes based on Alois Jirásek's novel of the same title (1944, instrumentation 1951–52)

=== Orchestral music ===
- Symphonietta – divertimento (1929)
- Suite from a comic opera (1933)
- Suite for Orchestra (1939–40)
- 20 Variations on the Composer s Own Theme in the Style of a Folk Song (1946–47)
- 14 Variations on the Song (Good – Night Called)
- There Is None Other Like My Deceased Spouse (1951–52)
- Serenade for Orchestra (1948–50)
- Symphony No 1 in D (1954–55)
- Symphony No 2 in C sharp (1956–57)
- Symphony No 3 in D (1961–63)
- Symphony No 4 (1966)
- Minor Suite for Strings
- Vivat Rossini. A concertante overture

=== Concertante music ===
- Concertino for Piano with an Accompamment of Wind Instruments (1935)
- Concertino for Violin with an Accompaniment of Wind Instruments (1936)
- Cocencertino for Violoncello and Orchestra (1939–40)

=== Chamber music ===
- Divertimento (Cassation) for Flute, Clarinet, Trumpet and Bassoon (1925)
- Sonatina for Clarinet and Piano (1929–30)
- Trio – Divertimento for Oboe, Clarinet and Bassoon (1935)
- Trio for Clarinet, Double Bass and Piano (1936)
- Little Funeral Music for Alto, Viola, Violoncello, Double Bass and Piano to Texts of the Psalms and František Halas' Poem "Old Women" (1933, rewritten 1936)
- Divertimento for Nonet (1937)
- Tre scherzini for pianoforte (1953), according to the original arrangement of the composition for flute and piano from the year 1945
- String Quartet No 2 in D-minor (1953)
- String Quartet No 3 "In My Father's Memory" (1960)
- Sonatina concertante for violoncello and pianoforte (1961)
- Wind Quintet (1964)
- Trio for Violin, Violoncello and Piano with a song for a female voice to the text of a Psalm
- Four Encore Pieces for Violin and Piano (1966)
- String Quartet No 4 (1966)
- String Quartet No 5 (1967)

=== Songs ===
- Five Songs to Texts by Vítězslav Nezval (1926–27)
- Six Songs to Texts by Jan Neruda for Baritone and Piano or Orchestra (1931)
- Imitations of Czech Songs for Tenor and Wind Quintet to Words by František Ladislav Čelakovský (1936)
- Motives from Antiquity, for a lower male voice and orchestra or piano (1936, arrangement and instrumentation, 1947)
- Five Songs to Texts by Jan Amos Komenský for Singing and Piano (1938)
- Four Songs to Texts by Jan Neruda for a middle male voice (1939–40)

=== Choral compositions ===
- The Song of the Multitudes. A fugue for a mixed choir and large orchestra to a text by Josef Hora (1925, instrumentation 1948)
- Four Madrigals to Words by Karel Hynek Mácha for a smaller mixed choir, tenor solo and piano (1936)
- From the Region of Bagpipers (Z dudáckého kraje). A bouquet of songs after melodies of songs for soprano, tenor, baritone and large orchestra, collected by Karel Weis (1939)
- Sacred Carols Sung During Christmas-time (Koledy posvátné v čas vánoční), for a children's or mixed choir with orchestra and organ (1939)
- Military Songs from the Záhorácko Region (Vojenské písničky ze Záhorácka), for a male choir unisono, tenor and soprano solo with orchestra (1950)
- Four Male Choirs in the Traditional Style to Words by Czech Poets (1966–67)
