= Vidyasagar College =

College in Kolkata, India

Vidyasagar College, Kolkata
- Former name: Metropolitan Institution
- Motto: Upholding the cause of education and nation building
- Type: Public, Governmental, co-educational
- Established: 1872; 154 years ago (as Metropolitan Institution); 1917; 109 years ago (as Vidyasagar College)
- Founder: Pt. Ishwar Chandra Vidyasagar
- Affiliations: NAAC (under UGC)
- Academic affiliations: University of Calcutta
- Principal: Dr. Natasa Dasgupta
- Students: 3500 (approximate)
- Location: Kolkata, West Bengal, India; 22.5817693°N 88.3661595°E
- Campus: Urban (total ~4 acres, including three campus and playground)
- Website: vidyasagarcollege.edu.in

- Location within Kolkata Location within India

Vidyasagar College is a state government-aided public college, located in North Kolkata, West Bengal, India. The college offers both post-graduate and under-graduate courses in a number of subjects of arts and science. Founded in 1872, it was the first private college (now governmental) in India which was purely run, maintained and financed by Indians. Formerly known as Metropolitan Institution, it was named after its founder Pandit Ishwar Chandra Vidyasagar in 1917.

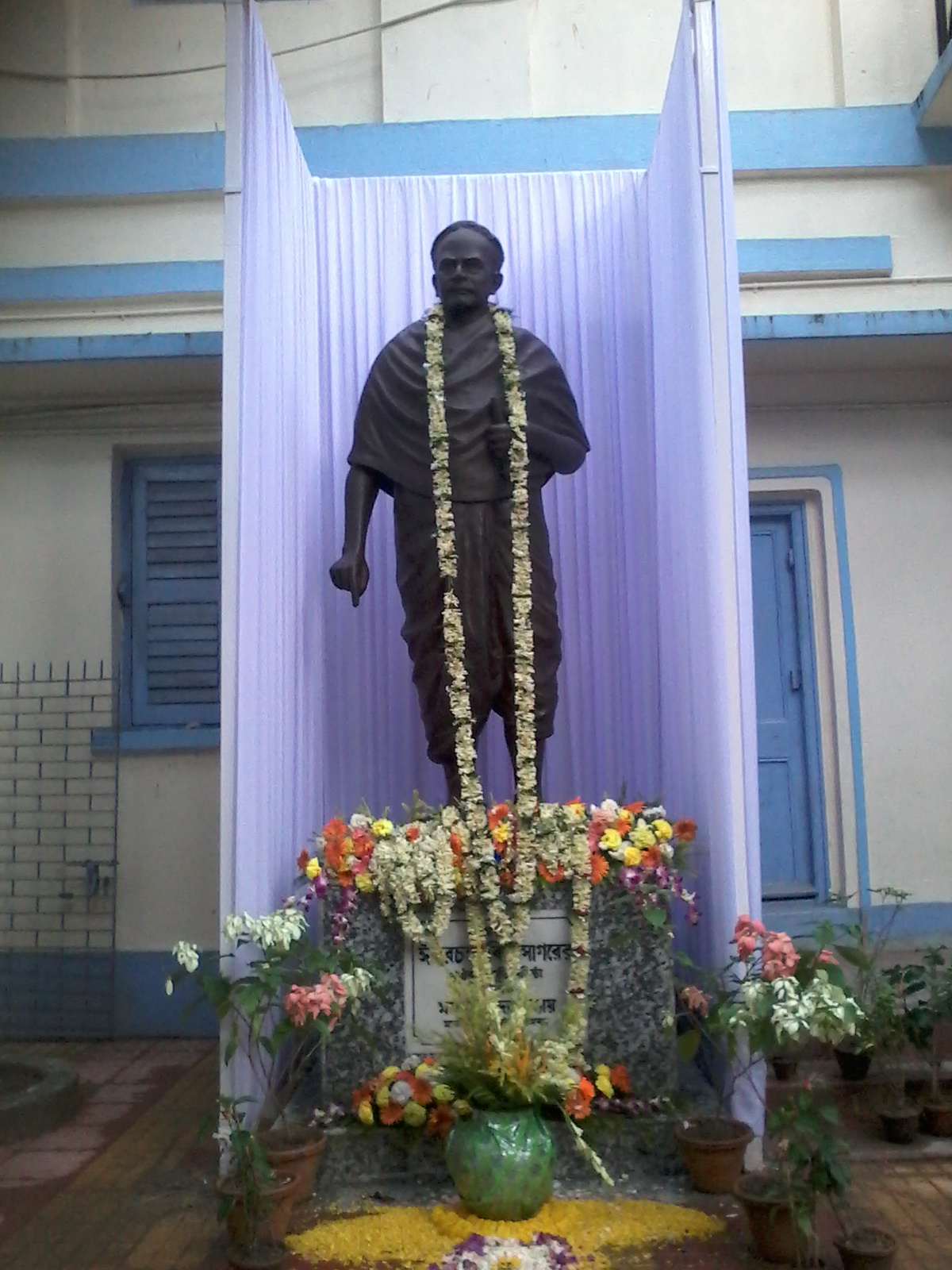
Statue of Pandit Iswar Chandra Vidyasagar at the Bidhan Sarani campus

The college is affiliated to Calcutta University, under UGC and accredited by NAAC. It follows semester based CBCS system. The college does not participate in NIRF ranking in college category. The college was a part of DBT STAR College Scheme. The college receives funding from State Government, UGC (via CU) and other GOI-affiliated institutes or schemes i.e RUSA, ICSSR, AICTE and NIEIT.

== History ==
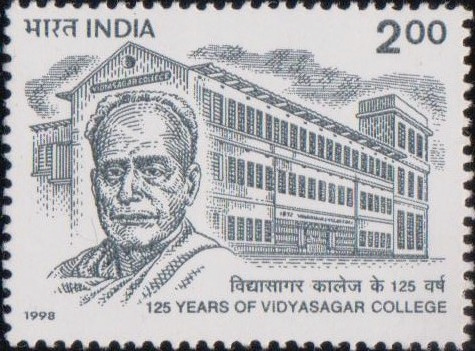
A 1998 stamp dedicated to the 125th anniversary of Vidyasagar College

A Bengali educationist named Thakurdas Chakraborty founded Metropolitan Training School (later Calcutta Training School) in 1859 at 1 Arpuly Lane, Kolkata. Pundit Ishwar Chandra Vidyasagar, the educationist and social reformer, joined the institution as the President of the Managing Committee in the school in 1860. In 1864, the school was renamed as the Metropolitan Institution.

=== Upgradation to college ===
In 1864, Ishwar Chandra Vidyasagar applied to the Calcutta University for their affiliation to the First Arts (FA) course. The application was turned down, mainly due to the objection raised by Mr J. Sutcliffe, the then Principal of Presidency College. He stated that giving affiliation to a competitive college run by the Indians may undermine the dignity and importance of Presidency College. However, the students of the school performed extremely well in the Entrance Examination, conducted by the University of Calcutta in 1871. For this brilliant performance of students, Pundit Vidyasagar renewed his efforts for getting affiliation of the University. This time, despite some opposition, the University Vice-Chancellor, Edward Clive Bail, agreed to the proposal and on 27 January 1871, the Syndicate in its meeting sanctioned the prayer for affiliation and recommended it to the Government. Finally, on 19 February 1871 the Government of India sanctified affiliation of the institution up to the standard of the First Examination in Arts (FA), with effect from the month of January 1872. The college became the first private and truly secular college in the Presidency of Bengal, run, taught and even financed by Indians. The college initially started with only 5 departments, which included Sanskrit, English, Philosophy and General History. Masses like Surendranath Banerjee were associated with teaching in the institute.

The College received affiliation of the University for Imparting Education up to Graduation level in 1879 and for BL course in 1882.

=== Renaming, upgrowth and formation of evening and woman wings ===
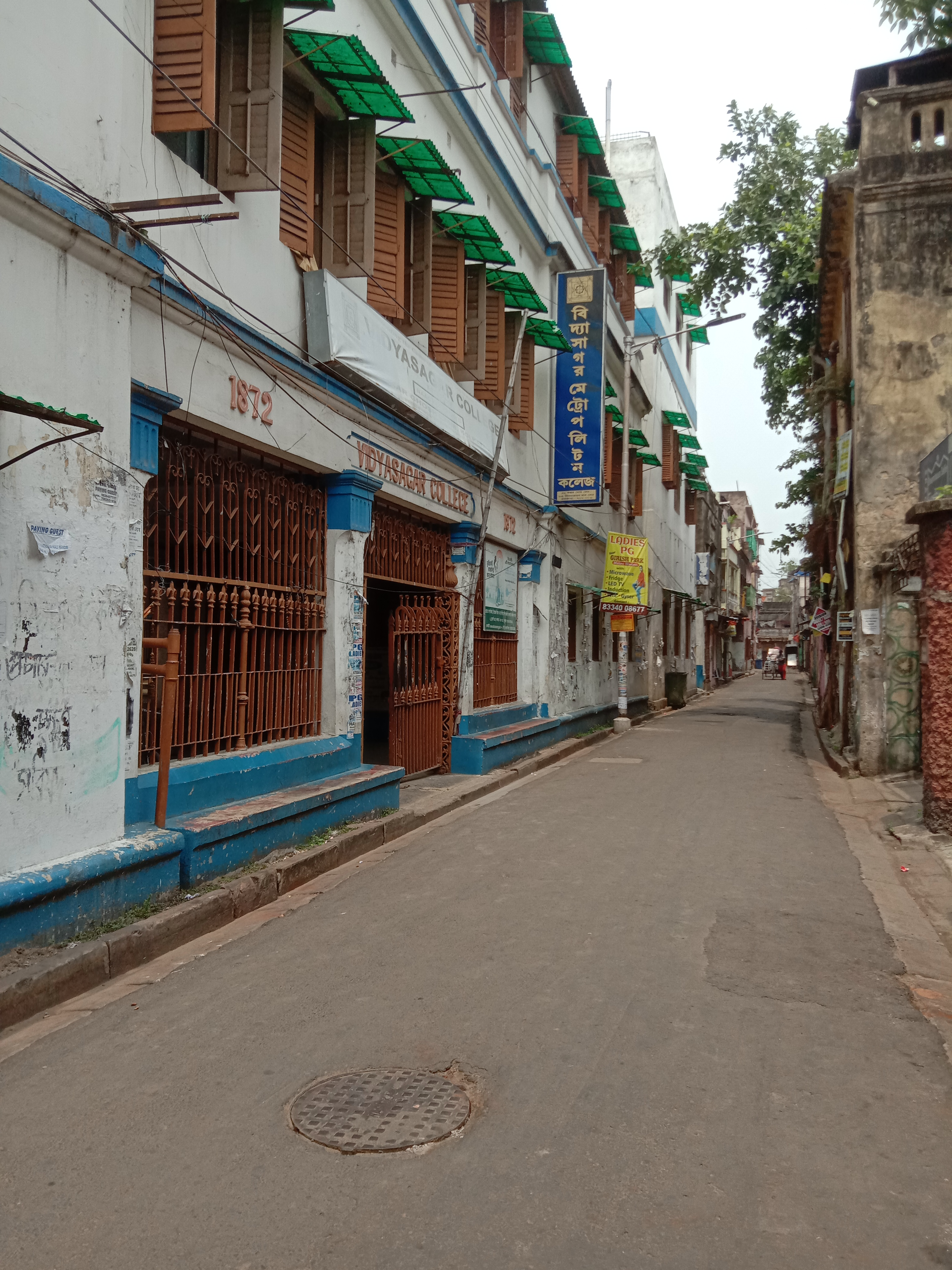
Main entrance of the college, at 39, Sankar Ghosh Lane, Simla, Machuabazar.

After the death of the founder in 1891, Metropolitan Institute, was renamed to Vidyasagar College in 1917. Saradaranjan Ray, who taught Sanskrit, was the principal of the college, at that time. His third brother, Muktidaranjan Ray, who taught Mathematics, was also a professor of this college. Since 1917 the College entered a phase of rapid upgradation, expanded academic curriculum and introduced a commerce department in 1922. The Commerce Department has been considered as the oldest commerce teaching department in India. It had its affiliation up to B.Com standard in 1928 and gradually attracted students from whole India.

Due to the rapid growth of the commerce section, in terms of faculty and student strength, a separate wing devoted to commerce teaching in evening hours was established in 1951. In 1961, the evening section emerged as an independent entity with a separate Governing Body and affiliation from University of Calcutta, having a new name "Vidyasagar Metropolitan College".

On 1 July 1931, the Woman Section of the college was introduced. The classes for Woman section were scheduled in morning. In 1960, the morning Woman section separated as a new independent entity with the affiliation of University of Calcutta.

== Campuses ==
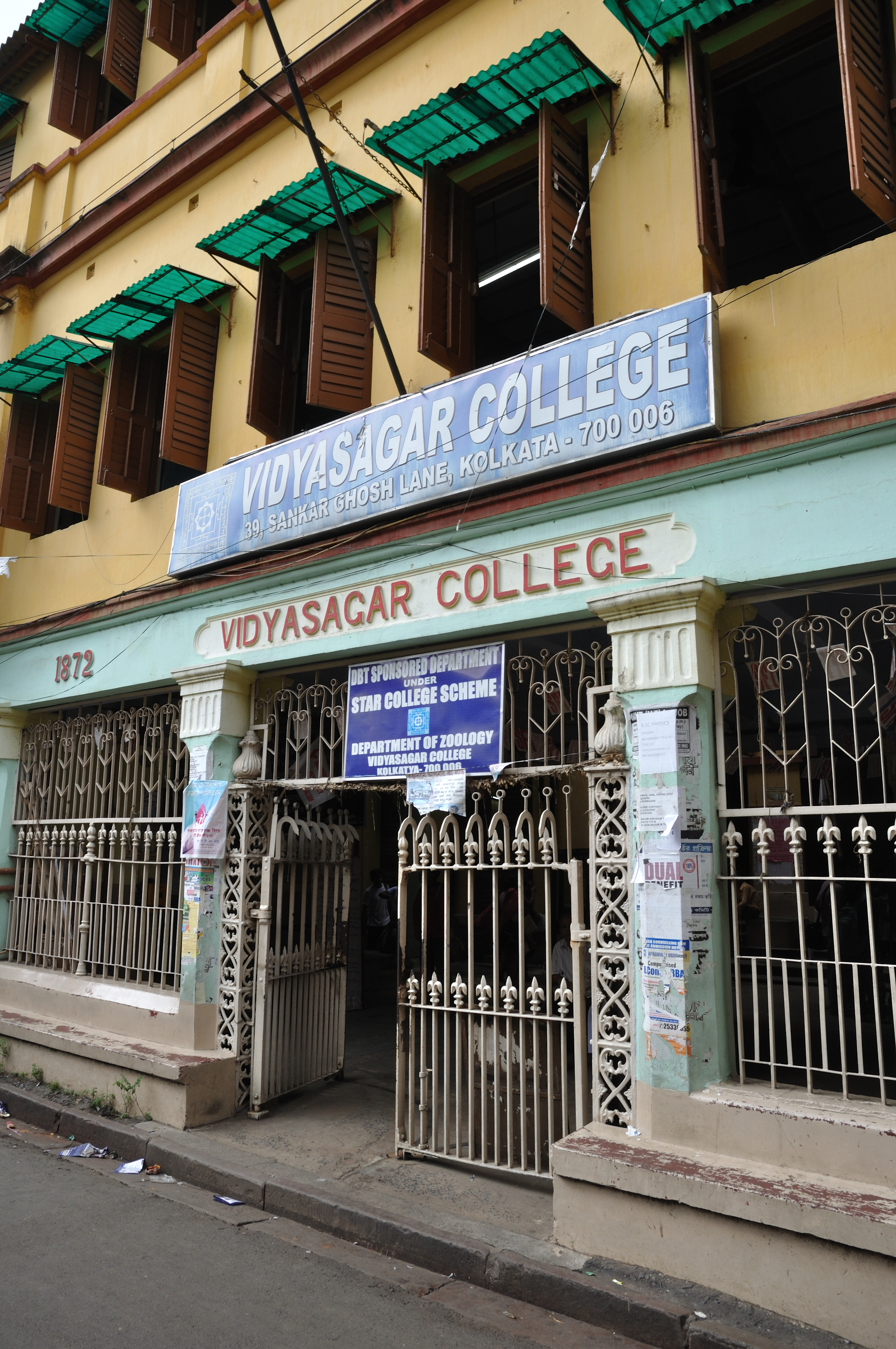
Old campus at Sankar Ghosh Lane

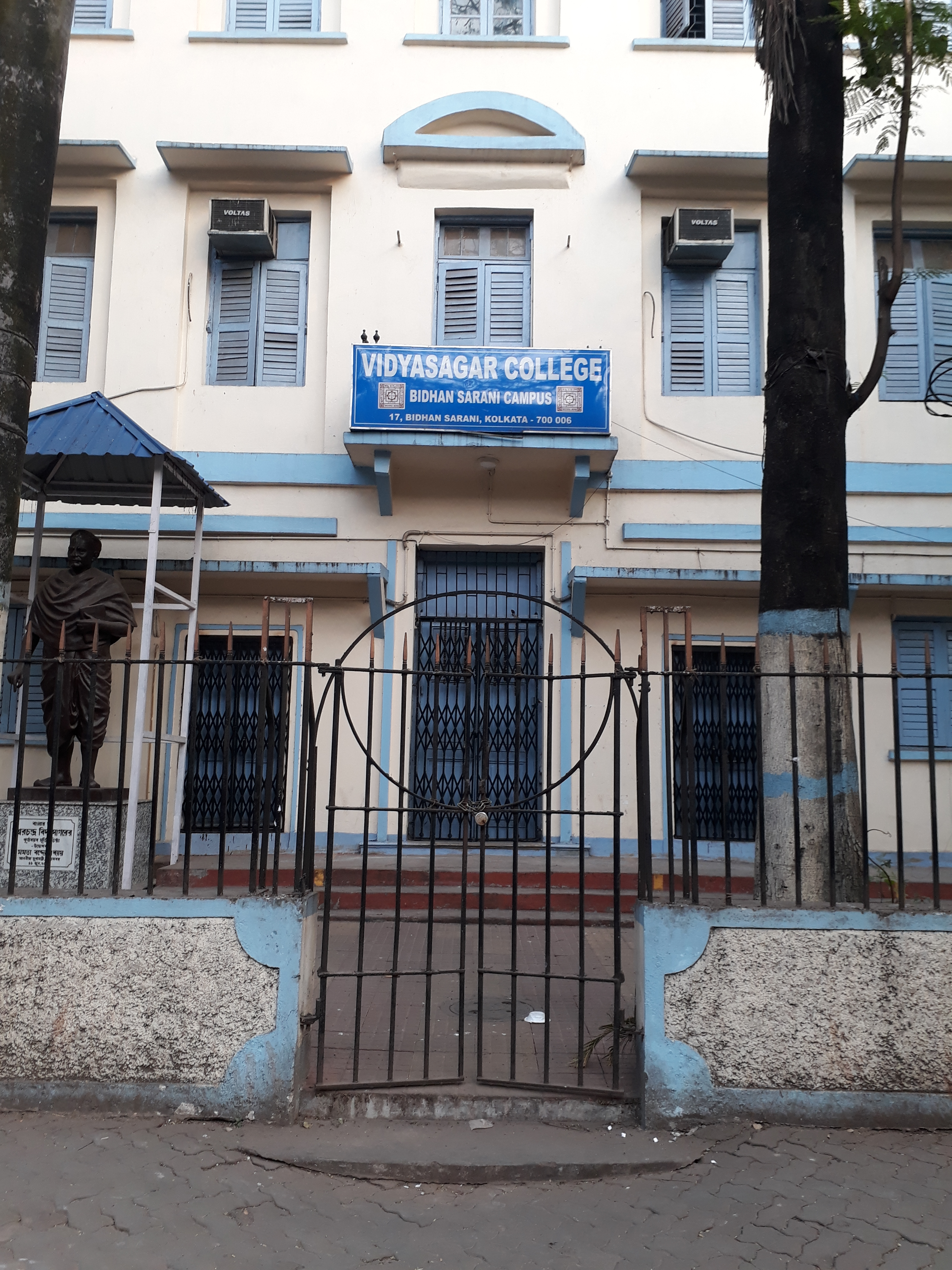
Bidhan Sarani campus

The college has three campuses in Kolkata: Main campus (heritage campus), Bidhan Sarani Campus' and Bidhannagar Campus. The main campus is at 39 Sankar Ghose Lane near the College Street. The second campus is Bidhan Sarani Campus at Bidhan Sarani Road, which is connected internally to the main campus. The Vidyasagar College for Women and Vidyasagar Metropolitan College (night college) are also connected in the same area. The college has its third campus named Bidhannagar Campus at the Salt lake Sector II, which is specialized for post-graduate courses. The three campuses and playground consists total around 3 acres (excluding Vidyasagar Women's college and Vidyasagar Metropolitan college campuses) with total built up area being 8210.13 sq. Mr.

== Academics ==
=== Departments and courses ===
The college has following 21 departments in UG level: English, Bengali, Hindi, Sanskrit, Philosophy, History, Political Science, Economics, Geography, Journalism, Physics, Chemistry, Mathematics, Computer Science, Electronics, Zoology, Botany, Physiology, Bio-Chemistry, Psychology and Food & Nutrition. The college offers 20 honours courses, 4 general courses.

The post graduate courses are offered in Geography (Regional Planning, Urban & Transport Geography, Advanced Geomorphology, Population & Welfare Geography) and Zoology (Fisheries and Aquaculture, Entomology, Environmental Biology and Ecotoxicology, Genetics and Molecular Biology, Parasites and Immunology).

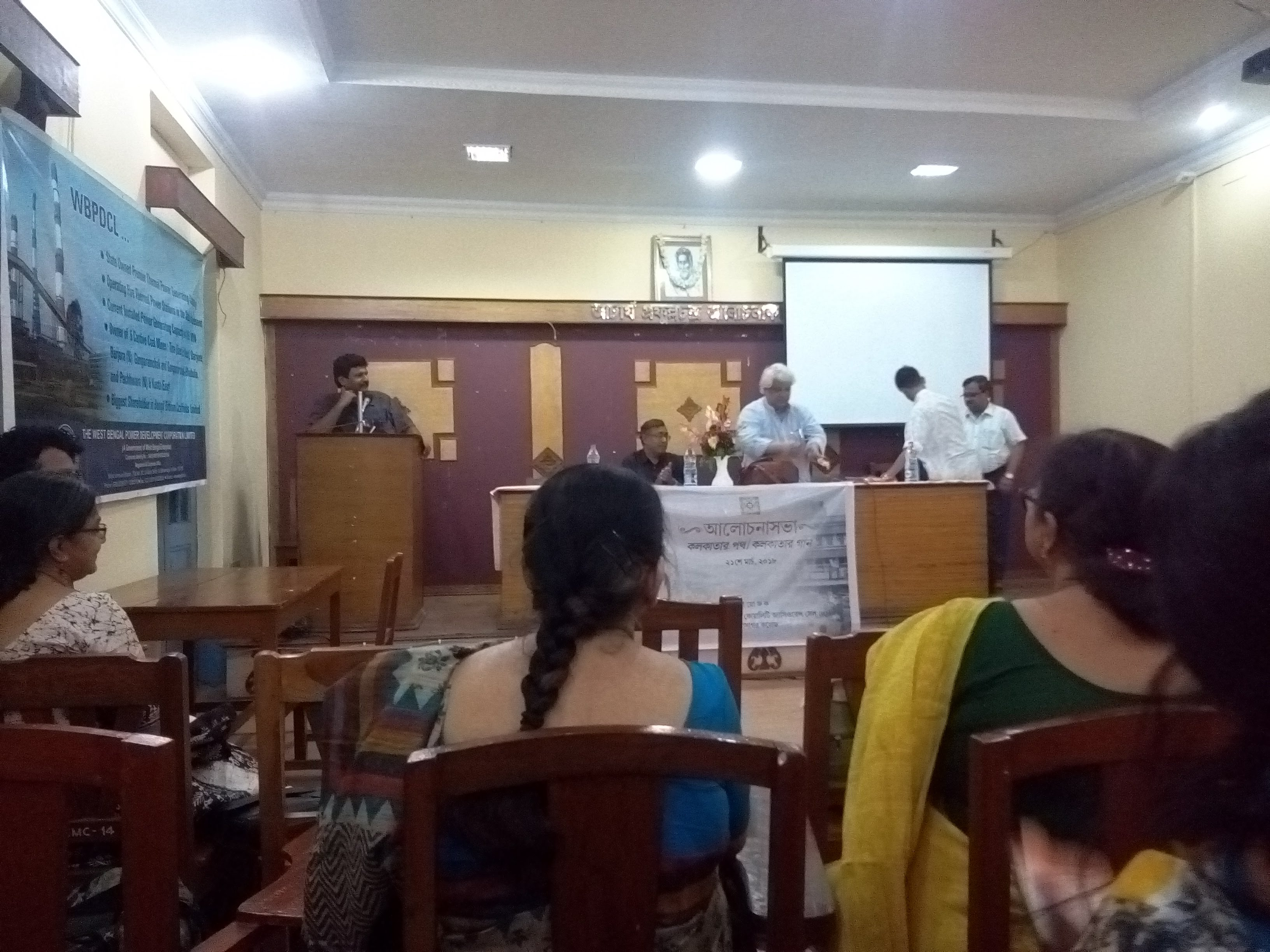
Ongoing seminar (title in Bengali: "কলকাতার পথ – কলকাতার গান") at the seminar room of Vidyasagar College, in March 2018.

=== Computer centre and courses ===
The college has a separate Computer Centre and computer education unit, which is directly accredited by the National Institute of Electronics and Information Technology, Department of Electronics, Government of India. It conducts CCC ,”O” Level and “A” Level Courses which are recognized by the All India Council of Technical Education (AICTE). The Directorate of Employment, Govt. of West Bengal has also recognized the courses that are taught at this centre. The Computer Centre is governed by an academic committee, composed of faculty members from the college and from the Institute of Computer Engineers (India). Various educational CDs can be accessed through the CD library of the centre.

=== NAAC Accreditation ===
In cycle 2 accreditation of 2016, by the National Assessment and Accreditation Council, the college was re-accredited a "B++" grade on the basis of CGPA 2.80. In cycle 1, the college was accredited a "B" grade on the basis of CGPA 2.63 under a four point scale.

== Incidents ==
=== Attacks due to political violence ===
A scuffle broke out between student activists from the Trinamool Congress and the Bharatiya Janata Party. Stone pelting incidents have been reported near a college hostel on Bidhan Sarani Street in Kolkata during Amit Shah's Road show in May 2019. BJP workers and supporters shouted "Jai Shri Ram" and "Narendra Modi Zindabad" during the road show. BJP activists locked the doors of the hostel and set up bicycles and motorbikes parked outside on fire. Local news organisation Anandabazar Patrika’s ground report shows stones being hurled inside the premises by people standing outside on the road, wearing saffron coloured “NaMo Again” t-shirts. The footage does not show anyone throwing stones from inside the campus. In the violence that followed, the bust of Ishwar Chandra Vidyasagar was vandalized.

== See also ==
- List of colleges affiliated to the University of Calcutta
- Education in India
- Education in West Bengal
- Vidyasagar College for Women
