= Vidyasagar College for Women =

- Type: Undergraduate college
- Established: 1960; 66 years ago
- Affiliations: University of Calcutta
- President: Dr. Sutapa Ray
- Principal: Dr. Sutapa Ray
- Location: 39, Sankar Ghosh Ln, Simla, Machuabazar, Kolkata, West Bengal, 700006, India; 22.5823517°N 88.3669152°E
- Campus: Urban
- Website: Vidyasagar College for Women
- Location within Kolkata Location within India

Vidyasagar College for Women is a women's college affiliated to the University of Calcutta. One of the most prestigious Women college in North kolkata. Its Govt. Aided College and offers undergraduate courses in arts, commerce and sciences. Grade A by National Assessment and Accreditation Council of India. It is funded by University Grants Commission (India).Financial assistance through the Kanyashree Prakalpa program by the West Bengal government is available for female students.Vidyasagar College for Women is situated in North Kolkata, the birthplace of the Bengal Renaissance, which emerged in the Bengal region of the British Raj.

== History ==
It was founded in 1960. However, its history goes back to 1931 when a separate women's section of the Vidyasagar College was started to cater to the educational requirements of the women folk of Kolkata. Since its foundation in 1960, Vidyasagar College for Women committed itself to carry forward the ideals and principles of Pundit Iswar Chandra Vidyasagar, the great educationist and social reformer of the 19th century..The Bengal Renaissance was a movement of social, cultural, intellectual, artistical and literary renewal that emerged in Bengal during the nineteenth and early twentieth centuries. It significantly influenced the modernization of Indian society and its educational system.

== About college ==
Vidyasagar College for Women is a morning college. The college offers a wide variety of both academic and job oriented professional courses. The main campus is located at 39, Sankar Ghosh Lane, Kolkata 6 and its upcoming annexe at 8A Shibnarayan Das Lane and at Vidyasagar Smriti Mandir, the residence of Pundit Iswar Chandra Vidyasagar at 36 Vidyasagar Street, Kolkata 700 009.Vidyasagar College for Women are located at the main of North Kolkata, the central zone of the Bengal Renaissance movement.

== Course offered ==
- Bengali
- English
- Political Science
- History
- Hindi
- Education
- Journalism & Mass Communication
- Sociology
- Film Studies
- Sanskrit
- Geography
- Philosophy

=== Commerce ===
- Economics

=== Science ===
- Zoology
- Mathematics
- Physics
- Chemistry
- Physiology
- Electronics
- Botany
- Environmental Science

== Library ==
The college has two libraries - (a) a central library located on the third campus at 8A, Shibnarayan Das Lane, with over 23,000 physical documents; and (b) a seminar library located on the main campus. With about 1000 reference volumes, the seminar library caters mainly to the Humanities department. The library is in the process of complete library automation. Originally based on SOUL software, it has started the transition to move to Koha ILS. The online public access catalog (OPAC) is available and can be accessed at https://vcfw-opac.l2c2.co.in/

== Notable alumni ==
- Mala Roy, Member of Lok Sabha for Kolkata Dakshin.
- Chhandabani Mukherjee: Senior Journalist, Saptahik Bartaman.
- Soma Ghosh, Former Principal, Sarojini Naidu College for Women, Kolkata

== Notable President ==
- Vivek Gupta

== Certificate Course ==
- Beautician Course
- Baking Course
- Graphics design

Certificate course discounted after 2023

== Status and Initiatives ==
- Scholarship for meritorious and economically weak SC/ST/OBC category students is available for every year.
- National Level Conference on New Guidelines for AQAR, IIQA, SSR and Quality Enhancement in Higher Education. This two-day conference is organized by IQAC, Vidyasagar College for Women in collaboration with NAAC at Sep 16, 2022
- 203rd Birth Anniversary Celebration of Pandit Ishwar Chandra Vidyasagar, programme marked a collaborative effort of Vidyasagar Celebration Committee of Vidyasagar college, IQAC and Vidyasagar Society, Bangladesh. The collaborative international seminar began with the first speaker of the day, Prof. Aishika Chakraborty, Director, School of Women's Studies, Jadavpur University at 26.09.2023.
- One-Day State Level Seminar Artificial Intelligence & Indian Cinema Organized by Vidyasagar College for Women, Prabhu Jagatbandhu College and A. P. C. College on 18.12.2023 with special lecture of Filmmaker Ashoke Viswanathan.

== Recognition ==
Vidyasagar College for Women has been accredited with Grade A by the National Assessment and Accreditation Council of India (NAAC) .

== In popular culture ==
Indian film director Kali Prasad Ghosh made Vidyasagar (1950 film), a Bengali biographical film about Ishwar Chandra's life in 1950 which starred Pahadi Sanyal in the titular role.

== Scholarship for Students ==
Monetary grant under Kanyashree Prakalpa of the Govt. of West Bengal is offered to girl students

== See also ==
- List of colleges affiliated to the University of Calcutta
- Education in India
- Education in West Bengal
- Vidyasagar College
