= Pozdvižení v Efesu =

Pozdvižení v Efesu (Turmoil in Ephesus) is a Czech-language opéra bouffe by Iša Krejčí to a libretto by Josef Bachtík based on Shakespeare's The Comedy of Errors. It was written from 1939 until 1943.

== Recordings ==
- "Co láska je? Co o ni vis?" Zdeněk Otava
