= Ishwar Chandra Vidyasagar =

Indian educator and social reformer

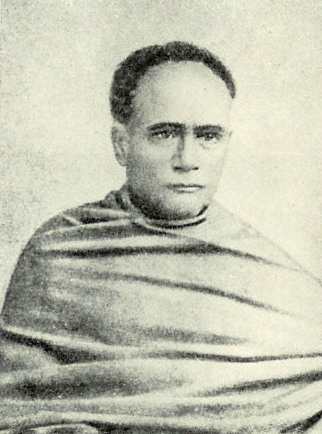
- Pronunciation: [iʃːɔɾt͡ʃɔnd̪ɾo bid̪ːaʃaɡɔɾ]
- Born: Ishwar Chandra Bandyopadhyay; 26 September 1820; Birsingha, Bengal Presidency, British India
- Died: 29 July 1891 (aged 70); Calcutta, Bengal Presidency, British India (now West Bengal, India)
- Citizenship: British India
- Education: Sanskrit College (1828–1839)
- Occupations: Educator, social reformer and author
- Spouse: Dinamayee Devi
- Children: 1
- Writing career
- Language: Bengali

Signature
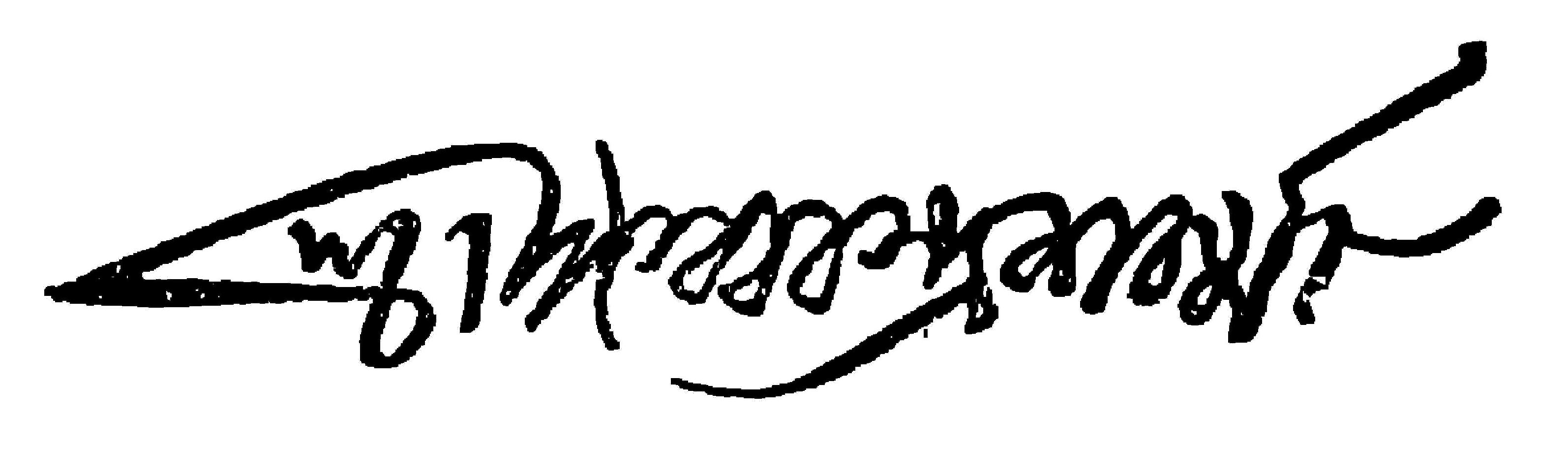

Ishwar Chandra Bandyopadhyay (26 September 1820 – 29 July 1891), popularly known as Ishwar Chandra Vidyasagar (Note: Bengali pronunciation: [iʃːɔɾt͡ʃɔnd̪ɾo bid̪ːaʃaɡɔɾ]; lit. 'Vidya-Sagar, the Ocean of Knowledge'.) (Bengali pronunciation: [iʃːɔɾt͡ʃɔnd̪ɾo bid̪ːaʃaɡɔɾ]), was an Indian educator and social reformer of the 19th century.

He was renowned as one of the principal proponents of the Bengal Renaissance. Eminent scholar and Vidyasagar Society Bangladesh President Dr. Rashid Askari contends that despite his orientation as a Sanskritist, Vidyasagar embraced the Western Enlightenment ideas of secularism, agnosticism, rationalism, and liberty. He abhorred fundamentalism, orthodoxy, superstition and fanaticism and regarded most of the teachings of ancient Hindu scriptures as incongruous in the context of the modern age. The most striking aspects of his character were his indomitable passion for pursuit and dissemination of knowledge, unswerving reforming zeal, liberal attitudes and secular humanism.

He was the most prominent campaigner for Hindu widow remarriage, petitioning the Legislative Council despite severe opposition, including a counter-petition (by Radhakanta Deb and the Dharma Sabha) which had nearly four times as many signatures. Even though widow remarriage was considered a flagrant breach of Hindu customs and was staunchly opposed, Lord Dalhousie personally finalised the bill, and the Hindu Widows' Remarriage Act, 1856, was passed. Against child marriage, the efforts of Vidyasagar led to the Age of Consent Act, 1891. In which the minimum age of consummation of marriage was 12 years.

A weekly newspaper, Somprakash Patrika, was started on 15 November 1858 (1 Agrahayan 1265 BS) by Dwarakanath Vidyabhusan. Dwarakanath (1819–1886) was a professor of the Sanskrit College in Calcutta, India. The original plan was mooted by Ishwar Chandra Vidyasagar (1820–1891), who continued to advise Dwarakanath in editorial matters. He was also associated as secretary with the Hindu Female School, which later came to be known as Bethune Female School.

He excelled in his undergraduate studies of Sanskrit and philosophy. The Sanskrit College and University, where he studied, gave him the honorific title Vidyasagar ('Ocean of Knowledge'; from the Sanskrit विद्या, vidyā, 'knowledge' and सागर, sāgara, 'ocean').

== Biography ==
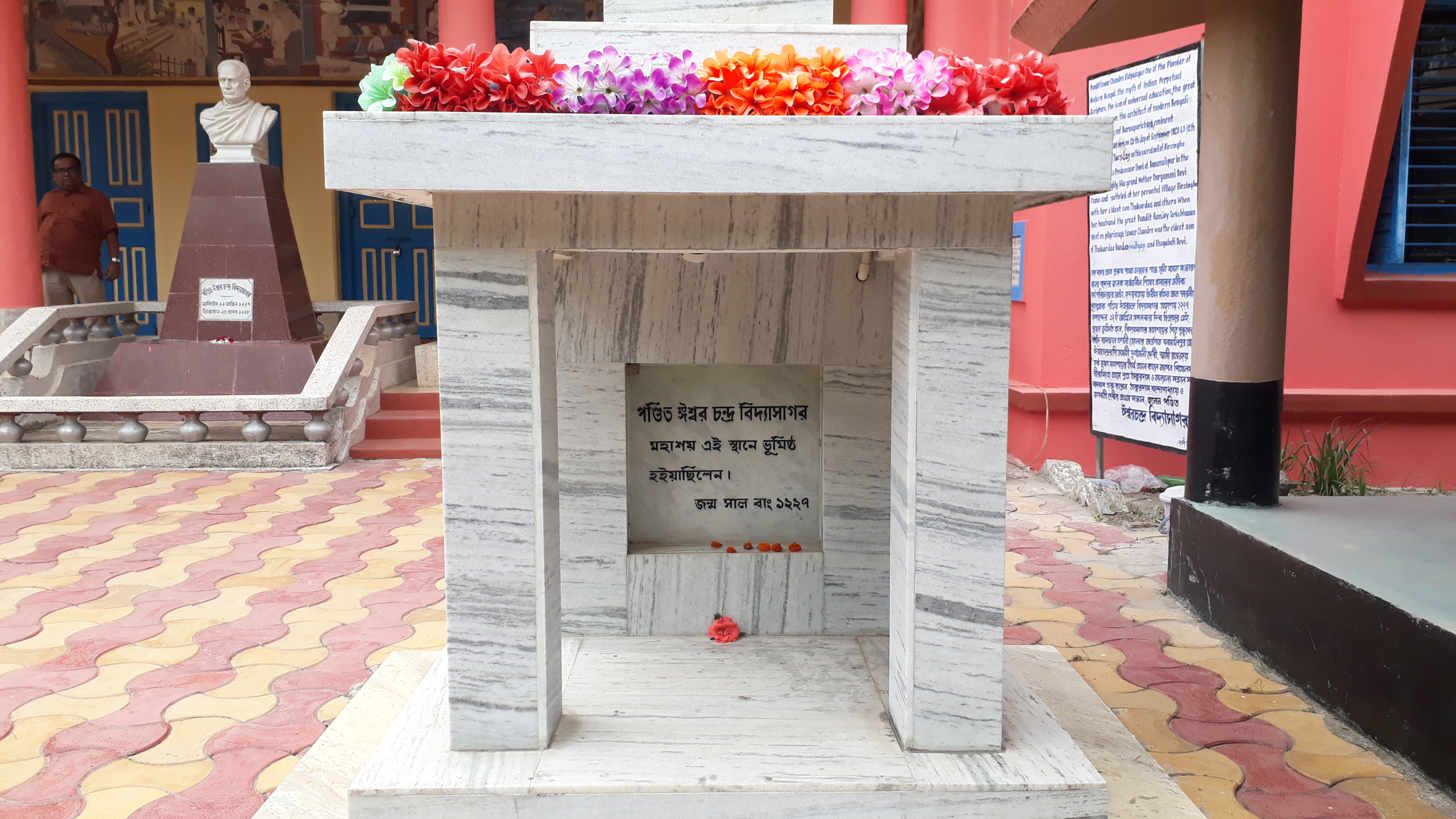
Birthplace of Ishwar Chandra Vidyasagar in Birsingha village

Ishwar Chandra Vidyasagar was born in a Bengali Brahmin family to Thakurdas Bandyopadhyay and Bhagavati Devi at Birsingha village in Paschim Medinipur District (erstwhile undivided Midnapore District) on 26 September 1820. The family originally hailed from Banamalipur, situated in the present-day Hooghly district. At the age of 9, he went to Calcutta and started living in Bhagabat Charan's house in Burrabazar, where Thakurdas had already been staying for some years. Ishwar felt at ease amidst Bhagabat's large family and settled down comfortably in no time. Bhagabat's youngest daughter Raimoni's motherly and affectionate feelings towards Ishwar touched him deeply and had a strong influence on his later revolutionary work towards the upliftment of women. He championed the cause of female education.

His quest for knowledge was so intense that he used to study under a street light, as it was not possible for him to afford a gas lamp at home. He cleared all the examinations with excellence and in quick succession. He was rewarded with a number of scholarships for his academic performance. To support himself and the family, Ishwar Chandra also took a part-time job teaching at Jorashanko. Ishwar Chandra joined the Sanskrit College, Calcutta, and studied there for twelve long years and graduated in 1841, qualifying in Sanskrit Grammar, Literature, Dialectics [Alankara Shastra], Vedanta, Smriti, and Astronomy. As was the custom then, Ishwar Chandra married at the age of fourteen. His wife was Dinamayee Devi. Narayan Chandra Bandyopadhyaya was their only son.

In the year 1839, Ishwar Chandra Vidyasagar successfully cleared his Sanskrit law examination. In 1841, at the age of twenty-one years, Ishwar Chandra joined Fort William College as head of the Sanskrit department.

After five years, in 1846, Vidyasagar left Fort William College and joined the Sanskrit College as 'Assistant Secretary'. In the first year of service, Ishwar Chandra recommended a number of changes to the existing education system. This report resulted in a serious altercation between Ishwar Chandra and College Secretary Rasomoy Dutta. In 1849, against the advice of Rasomoy Dutta, he resigned from Sanskrit College and rejoined Fort William College as a head clerk.

== Widow Remarriage Act ==
Vidyasagar championed the upliftment of the status of women in India, particularly in his native Bengal. Unlike some other reformers who sought to set up alternative societies or systems, he sought to transform society from within. Vidyasagar also fought against child marriage and the practice of men marrying many girls (polygamy)

Unable to tolerate the ill-treatment, many of these girls would run away and turn to prostitution to support themselves. Ironically, the economic prosperity and lavish lifestyles of the city made it possible for many of them to have successful careers once they stepped out of the confines of society and into the demi-monde. In 1853, it was estimated that Calcutta had a population of 12,700 prostitutes and public women. Many widows had to shave their heads and don white saris, supposedly to discourage attention from men. They led a deplorable life, Vidyasagar thought it was unfair, and sought out the changes.

== Opposing Spread of Education beyond Higher Classes ==
The Wood's despatch of 1854—considered the Magna Carta of Indian education—adopted a new policy towards 'mass education'. Hitherto, the official focus was on the upper classes of the population for education. Dubbed the 'Downward Filtration Theory', this implied that education always filters down from the upper classes of society to the common masses.

In 1859, the government's education policy reiterated "the spread of vernacular elementary instruction among the lower orders". Upon this, Vidyasagar addressed a letter, dated 29 September 1859, to John Peter Grant, the Lieutenant Governor of Bengal, underlining his perception:

An impression appears to have gained ground, both here and in England, that enough has been done for the education of the higher classes and that attention should now be directed towards the education of the masses... An inquiry into the matter will, however, show a very different state of things. As the best, if not the only practicable means of promoting education in Bengal, the Government should, in my humble opinion, confine itself to the education of the higher classes on a comprehensive scale.

The words "higher classes" in Bengali parlance do not entail anything but caste, which bestows or withdraws the privilege of education on a person by birth. Thus, Vidyasagar explicitly advocated for confining education to "higher classes".

Earlier in 1854, Vidyasagar had scoffed at the admission of a wealthy man from the goldsmith caste of Bengal in the Sanskrit College, Calcutta. His argument was that "in the scale of castes, the goldsmith class (Subarnabanik) stands very low". Notably, Sanjib Chattopadhyay, a biographer of Vidyasagar, revealed that Ishwar Chandra started his primary education in a school established and maintained by Shibcharan Mallick, a rich man of the goldsmith caste in Calcutta.

== Vidyasagar in Santhal Pargana ==
Ishwar Chandra Vidyasagar’s long association with Karmatar, a sleepy hamlet in present-day Jharkhand, about 20 km from the district headquarters of Jamtara, seems to have been forgotten by the people of the state.

Vidyasagar came to Karmatar in 1873 and spent more than 18 years of his life here. He had set up a girls' school and a night school for adults on the premises of his house, which he called Nandan Kanan. He also opened a free homoeopathy clinic to provide some medical care to these unprivileged tribal people.

After his death, the Nandan Kanan, the abode of Vidyasagar, was sold by his son to the Mallick family of Kolkata. Before Nandan Kanan could be dismantled Bengali Association of Bihar on 29 March 1974 purchased it with money collected by house-to-house contribution of one rupee each. The Girls' School has been restarted, named after Vidyasagar. The Free Homeopathic Clinic is serving the local population. The house of Vidyasagar has been maintained in its original shape. The most prized property is the 141-year-old 'Palanquin' used by Vidyasagar himself.

The Government of Jharkhand, on 26 September 2019, named Jamtara district's Karmatand block as Ishwar Chandra Vidyasagar Block as a mark of respect on the birth anniversary of the great social reformer.

An official release quote of Jharkhand's former Chief Minister Raghubar Das:

"Jamtara's Karmatand prakhand (block) was the 'karma bhumi' (workplace) of social reformer and strong supporter of women's education Ishwar Chandra Vidyasagar. Now the block will be known as Ishwar Chandra Vidyasagar prakhand"

He was also the secretary of Hindu Female School which later came to be known as Bethune Female School.

== Meeting with Ramakrishna ==
Vidyasagar was liberal in his outlook, even though he was born in an orthodox Hindu Brahmin family. Also, he was highly educated and influenced by Oriental thoughts and ideas. Ramakrishna, in contrast, did not have a formal education. Yet they had a nice relationship with each other. When Ramakrishna met Vidyasagar, he praised Vidyasagar as the sea of wisdom. Vidyasagar joked that Ramkrishna should have collected some amount of salty water from that sea. But, Ramakrishna, with profound humbleness & respect, replied that the water of the general sea might be salty, but not the water of the sea of wisdom.

== Accolades ==
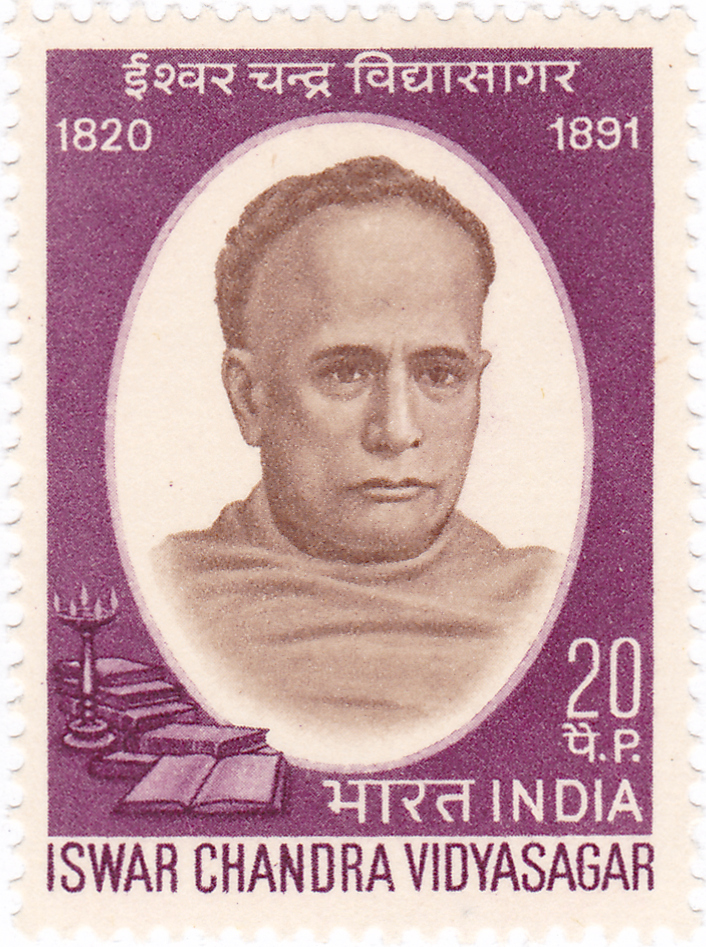
Ishwar Chandra Vidyasagar on a 1970 stamp of India

Shortly after Vidyasagar's death, Rabindranath Tagore reverently wrote about him: "One wonders how God, in the process of producing forty million Bengalis, produced a man!"

After death, he is remembered in many ways, some of them include:

1. In 2004, Vidyasagar was ranked number 9 in BBC's poll of the Greatest Bengali of all time.
2. Rectitude and courage were the hallmarks of Vidyasagar's character, and he was certainly ahead of his time. In recognition of his scholarship and cultural work the government designated Vidyasagar a Companion of the Indian Empire (CIE) in 1877 In the final years of life, he chose to spend his days among the "Santhals", an old tribe in India.
3. Indian Post issued stamps featuring Vidyasagar in 1970 and 1998.

List of places named after Ishwar Chandra Vidyasagar

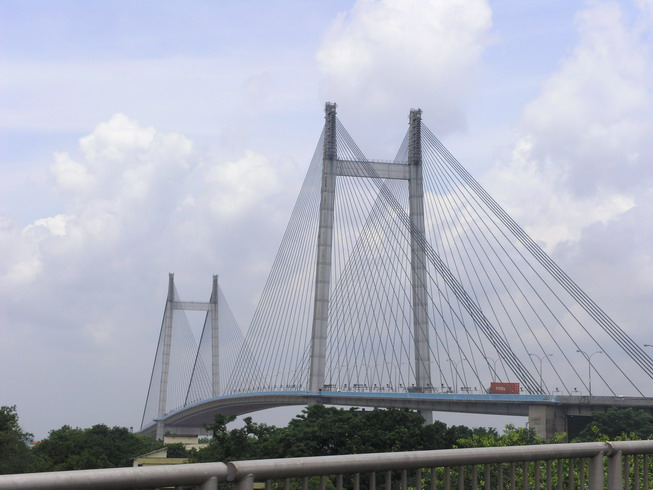
Vidyasagar Setu, which connects Howrah and Kolkata, is named after him.

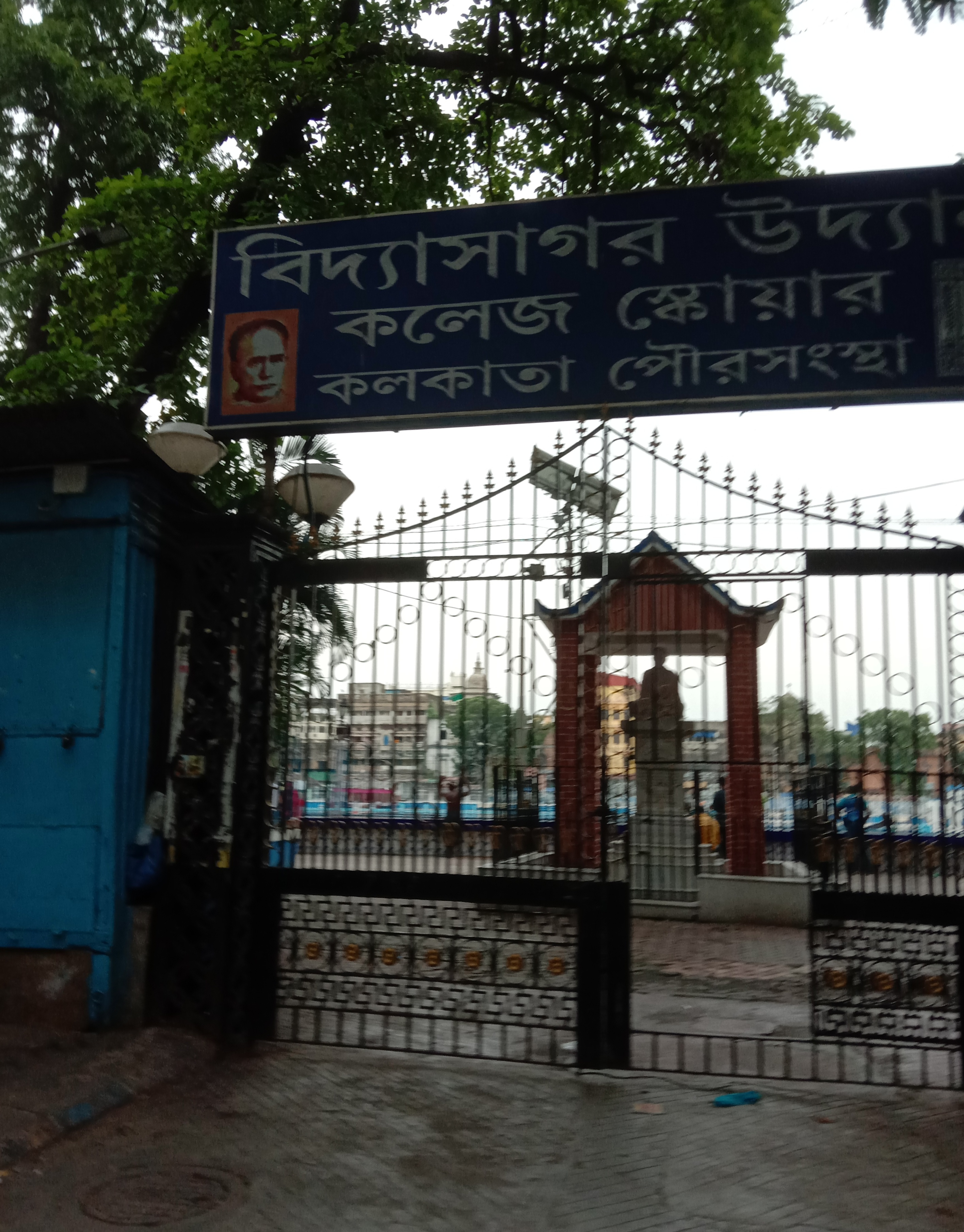
Vidyasagar Udyan (College Square) at College Street in Kolkata, named after him.

- Vidyasagar College
- Vidyasagar College for Women
- Vidyasagar Institute of Health
- Vidyasagar Mahavidyalaya
- Vidyasagar School of Social Work
- Vidyasagar Setu
- Vidyasagar Shishu Niketan
- Vidyasagar Teachers' Training College, Midnapore
- Vidyasagar University
- Vidyasagar Vidyapith
- Vidyasagar Vidyapith Girls' High School
- Vidyasagar Railway Station, Karmatanr, Jamtara
- Ishwar Chandra Vidyasagar Polytechnic

== In popular culture ==
Indian film director Kali Prasad Ghosh made Vidyasagar, a Bengali-language biographical film about Ishwar Chandra's life in 1950 which starred Pahadi Sanyal in the titular role.
