= Ajay Devgn filmography =

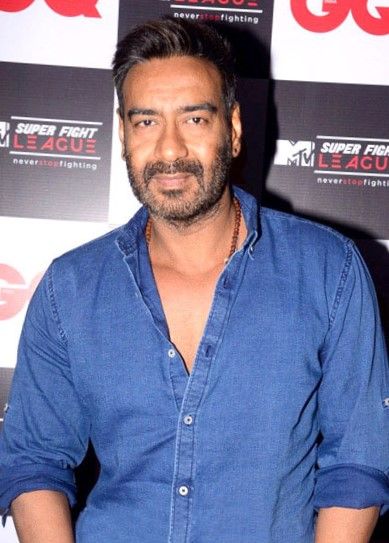
- Devgn in 2017
- Film: 110

Ajay Devgn is an Indian actor, director and producer who works in Hindi films. He debuted as an actor in Phool Aur Kaante (1991), which won him the Filmfare Award for Best Male Debut. Devgn then played a kickboxer in the martial arts film Jigar (1992) and a blind in Vijaypath (1994) and starred in Suhaag (1994), Dilwale (1994), Diljale (1996), Jaan (1996), Ishq (1997), Pyaar To Hona Hi Tha (1998), and Hum Dil De Chuke Sanam (1999). He garnered Filmfare Best Actor nominations for Naajayaz and Hum Dil De Chuke Sanam and also won his first National Film Award for Best Actor for his performance in Zakhm (1998). In 2000, Devgn started Ajay Devgn FFilms, producing and headlining the commercially unsuccessful Raju Chacha. He received a Filmfare Best Supporting Actor nomination for enacting a dacoit in the ensemble film Lajja (2001).

2002 proved to be a banner year for Devgn as he received universal acclaim for his performances in Company, The Legend of Bhagat Singh and Deewangee. He won his second National Award for portraying revolutionary Bhagat Singh in The Legend of Bhagat Singh and the Filmfare Critics Award for Best Actor for it and Company, along with a Filmfare Best Villain Award for Deewangee. In 2003, he acted in the Bhoot, a sleeper hit, and played a police officer in Gangaajal, which earned him another Filmfare Best Actor nomination. He was next featured in Yuva (2004), Kaal (2005), and Omkara (2006). Rohit Shetty's Golmaal series established Devgn in comic roles, producing Golmaal (2006), Golmaal Returns (2008) and Golmaal 3 (2010). However Devgn was highly panned for Aag (2007), based on the 1975 cult classic Sholay. Today, it is considered one of the worst films. In 2008, he made his directorial debut with his own production U Me Aur Hum. 2010 proved to be a milestone year for him as he delivered his first 100 Crore Club film with Golmaal 3 and received positive feedback for the top-grossing films Raajneeti and Once Upon a Time in Mumbaai. The latter fetched him a Filmfare Best Actor nomination, as like his next Singham (2011), the first part of Shetty's Cop Universe, which was later reprised in Singham Returns (2014) and briefly in other standalone films of the universe, culminating in Singham Again (2024).

Devgn has since remained in the league with the successful comedies Bol Bachchan (2012), Son of Sardaar (2012), Golmaal Again (2017), Total Dhamaal (2019) and De De Pyaar De (2019), the dramas Drishyam (2015), Raid (2018) and Drishyam 2 (2022), and the period epic Tanhaji (2020), which earned him his third National Film Award for Best Actor. However, he failed as a director after delivering a hat-trick of flops with Shivaay (2016), Runway 34 (2022) and Bholaa (2023). He also played brief roles in the period dramas RRR and Gangubai Kathiawadi (both 2022), and starred in Shaitaan (2024), Raid 2 (2025) and Dhamaal 4 (2026), all three of which were box office hits.

== Films ==
Key
†	Denotes films that have not yet been released

List of Ajay Devgn film credits
Year	Film	Actor	Producer	Director	Role	Notes	Ref.
1991	Phool Aur Kaante	Yes	No	No	Ajay Salgaonkar		
1992	Jigar	Yes	No	No	Raj "Raju" Verma		
1993	Divya Shakti	Yes	No	No	Prashant Varma		
1993	Platform	Yes	No	No	Raju		
1993	Sangraam	Yes	No	No	Raja S. Singh Kanwar		
1993	Shaktiman	Yes	No	No	Amar Chauhan		
1993	Dil Hai Betaab	Yes	No	No	Ajay		
1993	Ek Hi Raasta	Yes	No	No	Karan Singh		
1993	Bedardi	Yes	No	No	Vijay Saxena		
1993	Dhanwaan	Yes	No	No	Kashinath		
1994	Dilwale	Yes	No	No	Arun Saxena		
1994	Kanoon	Yes	No	No	Vishal Singh		
1994	Vijaypath	Yes	No	No	Karan		
1994	Suhaag	Yes	No	No	Ajay Sharma / Ajay Malhotra (Note: Devgn played a character with two different names.)		
1995	Naajayaz	Yes	No	No	Jai Bakshi		
1995	Hulchul	Yes	No	No	Deva		
1995	Gundaraj	Yes	No	No	Ajay Chauhan		
1995	Haqeeqat	Yes	No	No	Shiva/Ajay		
1996	Jung	Yes	No	No	Ajay Bahadur Saxena		
1996	Jaan	Yes	No	No	Karan Sharma		
1996	Diljale	Yes	No	No	Shyam		
1997	Itihaas	Yes	No	No	Karan Bakshi		
1997	Ishq	Yes	No	No	Ajay Rai		
1998	Major Saab	Yes	No	No	Virendra Pratap Singh		
1998	Pyaar To Hona Hi Tha	Yes	No	No	Shekhar Suryavanshi		
1998	Sar Utha Ke Jiyo	Yes	No	No	Vishal / Raju	Cameo	
1998	Zakhm	Yes	No	No	Ajay R. Desai		
1999	Kachche Dhaage	Yes	No	No	Aftab		
1999	Hogi Pyaar Ki Jeet	Yes	No	No	Raju		
1999	Hum Dil De Chuke Sanam	Yes	No	No	Vanraj		
1999	Hindustan Ki Kasam	Yes	Yes	No	Ajay/Tauheed (Note: Devgn played two different characters.)		
1999	Dil Kya Kare	Yes	Yes	No	Anand Kishore		
1999	Gair	Yes	No	No	Vijay Kumar/Dev		
1999	Thakshak	Yes	No	No	Ishaan Singh		
2000	Deewane	Yes	No	No	Vishal/Arun		
2000	Raju Chacha	Yes	Yes	No	Shekhar/Raju Chacha		
2001	Yeh Raaste Hain Pyaar Ke	Yes	No	No	Rohit Verma / Vikram "Vicky" Malhotra		
2001	Lajja	Yes	No	No	Bhulwa		
2001	Tera Mera Saath Rahen	Yes	No	No	Raj Dixit		
2002	Company	Yes	No	No	Malik		
2002	Hum Kisise Kum Nahin	Yes	No	No	Raja Sharma		
2002	The Legend of Bhagat Singh	Yes	No	No	Bhagat Singh		
2002	Deewangee	Yes	No	No	Tarang Bharadwaj / Ranjeet		
2003	Bhoot	Yes	No	No	Vishal Bhatia		
2003	Qayamat: City Under Threat	Yes	No	No	Rachit		
2003	Chori Chori	Yes	No	No	Ranbir Malhotra		
2003	Gangaajal	Yes	No	No	SP Amit Kumar		
2003	Parwana	Yes	No	No	Parwana		
2003	Zameen	Yes	No	No	Lieutenant Colonel Ranvir Singh Ranawat		
2003	LOC Kargil	Yes	No	No	Captain Manoj Kumar Pandey		
2004	Khakee	Yes	No	No	Yashwant Aangre		
2004	Masti	Yes	No	No	Inspector Sikander Tyagi		
2004	Yuva	Yes	No	No	Michael "Mike" Mukherjee		
2004	Raincoat	Yes	No	No	Manoj "Mannu" Tripathi		
2004	Taarzan: The Wonder Car	Yes	No	No	Deven Chaudhary	Cameo	
2005	Insan	Yes	No	No	Ajit Rathore		
2005	Blackmail	Yes	No	No	Shekhar R Mohan		
2005	Zameer: The Fire Within	Yes	No	No	Suraj Chauhan		
2005	Tango Charlie	Yes	No	No	BSF Soldier Hawaldar Mohammad Ali "Mike Alpha"		
2005	Kaal	Yes	No	No	Kaali Pratap Singh		
2005	Main Aisa Hi Hoon	Yes	No	No	Indraneel Thakur		
2005	Apaharan	Yes	No	No	Ajay Shastri		
2005	Shikhar	Yes	No	No	Gaurav Gupta		
2006	Dharti Kahe Pukar Ke	Yes	No	No	SP Kunal Singh	Cameo appearance	
2006	Golmaal: Fun Unlimited	Yes	No	No	Gopal Kumar Santoshi		
2006	The Awakening	Yes	Yes	No	Himself	Also editor; Short film	
2006	Omkara	Yes	No	No	Omkara "Omi" Shukla		
2007	Cash	Yes	No	No	Karan / Doc		
2007	Aag	Yes	No	No	Heerendra "Heero" Dhaan		
2008	Halla Bol	Yes	No	No	Ashfaque Khan/Sameer Khan		
2008	Sunday	Yes	No	No	ACP Rajveer Randhava		
2008	U Me Aur Hum	Yes	Yes	Yes	Ajay Mehra		
2008	Haal-e-Dil	Yes	No	No	Himself	Guest appearance	
2008	Mehbooba	Yes	No	No	Karan Dhariwal		
2008	Golmaal Returns	Yes	No	No	Gopal Kumar Santoshi		
2009	All the Best: Fun Begins	Yes	Yes	No	Prem Chopra		
2009	London Dreams	Yes	No	No	Arjun Joshi		
2010	Teen Patti	Yes	No	No	Sunny	Cameo appearance	
2010	Atithi Tum Kab Jaoge?	Yes	No	No	Puneet "Pappu" Bajpai		
2010	Raajneeti	Yes	No	No	Sooraj Kumar		
2010	Once Upon a Time in Mumbaai	Yes	No	No	Sultan Mirza		
2010	Aakrosh	Yes	No	No	Pratap Kumar		
2010	Golmaal 3	Yes	No	No	Gopal Kumar Santoshi		
2010	Toonpur Ka Super Hero	Yes	No	No	Aditya		
2011	Yamla Pagla Deewana	Yes	No	No	Narrator		
2011	Dil Toh Baccha Hai Ji	Yes	No	No	Naren Ahuja		
2011	Ready	Yes	No	No	Raju	Cameo appearance	
2011	Singham	Yes	No	No	Inspector Bajirao Singham		
2011	Rascals	Yes	No	No	Bhagat "Bhagu" Bhosle		
2012	Tezz	Yes	No	No	Aakash Rana		
2012	Bol Bachchan	Yes	Yes	No	Prithviraj Raghuvanshi		
2012	Son of Sardaar	Yes	Yes	No	Jaswinder Singh Randhawa (Jassi)		
2013	Himmatwala	Yes	No	No	Ravi Verma		
2013	Satyagraha	Yes	No	No	Manav Raghvendra		
2013	Mahabharat	Yes	No	No	Arjuna (voice)		
2014	Singham Returns	Yes	Yes	No	DCP Bajirao Singham		
2014	Action Jackson	Yes	No	No	Vishy/Jai (AJ)		
2014	Vitti Dandu	No	Yes	No	—	Marathi film	
2015	Hey Bro	Yes	No	No	Himself	Special appearance	
2015	Drishyam	Yes	No	No	Vijay Salgaonkar		
2016	Fitoor	Yes	No	No	Moazam	Special appearance	
2016	Shivaay	Yes	Yes	Yes	Shivaay		
2017	Guest in London	Yes	No	No	Ajay Gandotra	Cameo appearance	
2017	Baadshaho	Yes	No	No	Bhavani Singh		
2017	Poster Boys	Yes	No	No	Himself	Guest appearance	
2017	Golmaal Again	Yes	No	No	Gopal Kumar Santoshi		
2018	Aapla Manus	Yes	Yes	No	Himself	Guest appearance	
2018	Raid	Yes	No	No	Amay Patnaik		
2018	Helicopter Eela	No	Yes	No	—		
2018	Simmba	Yes	No	No	DCP Bajirao Singham	Cameo appearance	
2019	Total Dhamaal	Yes	Yes	No	Guddu Rastogi		
2019	De De Pyaar De	Yes	No	No	Ashish Mehra		
2020	Tanhaji	Yes	Yes	No	Tanaji Malusare	100th film (Note: 100 films excluding cameos, special appearances and short films)	
2020	Chhalaang	No	Yes	No	—		
2021	Tribhanga	No	Yes	No	—		
2021	The Big Bull	No	Yes	No	—		
2021	Bhuj: The Pride of India	Yes	Yes	No	Squadron Leader Vijay Karnik		
2021	Sooryavanshi	Yes	No	No	DCP Bajirao Singham	Cameo appearance	
2021	Velle	Yes	Yes	No	Himself	Guest appearance	
2022	Gangubai Kathiawadi	Yes	No	No	Rahim Lala	Cameo	
2022	RRR	Yes	No	No	Alluri Venkatarama Raju	Telugu film; Cameo	
2022	Runway 34	Yes	Yes	Yes	Lieutenant Flight Captain Vikrant Khanna		
2022	Thank God	Yes	No	No	Chitragupt "CG"		
2022	Drishyam 2	Yes	No	No	Vijay Salgaonkar		
2023	Bholaa	Yes	Yes	Yes	Bholaa		
2024	Article 370	Yes	No	No	Narrator		
2024	Shaitaan	Yes	Yes	No	Kabir Rishi		
2024	Maidaan	Yes	No	No	Syed Abdul Rahim		
2024	Auron Mein Kahan Dum Tha	Yes	No	No	Krishna		
2024	Singham Again	Yes	Yes	No	DCP Bajirao Singham		
2024	Naam	Yes	No	No	Shekhar / Michael & Amar Kumar	Delayed release, Filmed in 2004	
2025	Azaad	Yes	No	No	Vikram Singh	Cameo	
2025	Chhaava	Yes	No	No	Narrator		
2025	Raid 2	Yes	No	No	Amay Patnaik		
2025	Maa	No	Yes	No	—	Producer only	
2025	Son of Sardaar 2	Yes	Yes	No	Jaswinder Singh Randhawa (Jassi)		
2025	De De Pyaar De 2	Yes	No	No	Ashish "Ashu" Mehra		
2026	Shatak: Sangh Ke 100 Varsh	Yes	No	No	Narrator		
2026	Dhamaal 4	Yes	Yes	No	Guddu Rastogi		
2026	Drishyam: The Conclusion	Yes	No	No	Vijay Salgaonkar		
2027	Golmaal 5 †	Yes	No	No	Gopal Kumar Santoshi		
2027	Ranger †	Yes	No	No	TBA		
2027	Chauhaan †	Yes	No	No	TBA		
2027	Untitled Horror film †	Yes	Yes	No	TBA		

== Dubbing ==
Year	Film title	Actor	Character	Original Language	Dub Year Release	Notes
2012	Makkhi	N/A	Father (voiceover in opening credits)	Telugu	2012	
2016	Dhruva	Ram Charan	ASP K. Dhruva IPS	Telugu	2017	
2022	Ponniyin Selvan: I	N/A	Narrator	Tamil	2022	
2025	Karate Kid: Legends	Jackie Chan	Mr. Han	English	2025	

== Television ==
List of television credits
Year	Title	Role	Note	Ref.
2002–2004	Devi	—N/a	Producer	
2008	Rock-N-Roll Family	Judge		
2012	Ramleela – Ajay Devgn Ke Saath	Narrator		
2014	CID	DCP Bajirao Singham	Episode: "Singham in CID" (Part I–III)	
2018	Swami Ramdev - Ek Sangharsh	—N/a	Producer	
2020	LalBazaar	Presenter		
2021	Into The Wild With Bear Grylls	Celebrity guest		
2022	The Great Indian Murder	—N/a	Producer	
2022	Rudra: The Edge of Darkness	DCP Rudraveer "Rudra" Singh		
2023	The Trial	—N/a	Producer	
2026	Crime Patrol Season 10	Host		

== Music video appearances ==
List of music video credits
Year	Title	Performer	Ref.
2014	"Afsos"	Yo Yo Honey Singh, Raftaar, Apache Indian	
2022	"Har Ghar Tiranga"	Asha Bhosle, Sonu Nigam, Devi Sri Prasad	

== See also ==
- List of awards and nominations received by Ajay Devgn
