= Devgan =

Devgan is a surname native to India.

Notable people with the surname include:

- Anirudh Devgan (born 1969), Indian-American computer scientist
- Ajay Devgn (born Ajay Devgan, 1969), Indian actor
- Amish Devgan (born 1980), Indian news anchor
- Anil Devgan (1969–2020), Indian director and screenwriter, son of Veeru
- Veeru Devgan (1934–2019), Indian stunt director
