= Jigar (given name) =

Male given name

Jigar, Jeegar
- Pronunciation: /ˈdʒɪɡər/
- Gender: Male

Origin
- Origin: India

Other names
- Related names: Jigna, Jignesh

Jigar or Jeegar, is a given name used in Gujarati and English-language communities. Jigar is also Urdu slang for friend. The name has a Persian background and history. It mean kind-hearted. In Hindi, Jigar is used as a symbol of love and affection and is synonymous with courage. It has a FirstName Ranking of 16,796 of 2,903,037 on the WhitePages database.

== Literature ==
- Jigar Moradabadi, Poet
- Jigar Saraiya (from Sachin-Jigar), Musician

== Music ==
- Kumar Sanu's song Dil Jigar Nazar Kya Hai.
- Omkara song Beedi Jalailey Jigar se piya...
- Ladies vs Ricky Bahl song Jigar Da Tukda

== Television and film ==
- Jigar, Bollywood 1992 Indian film directed by Farogh Siddique.

== See also ==
- Jigar
