= Erika Kaar =

Polish actress

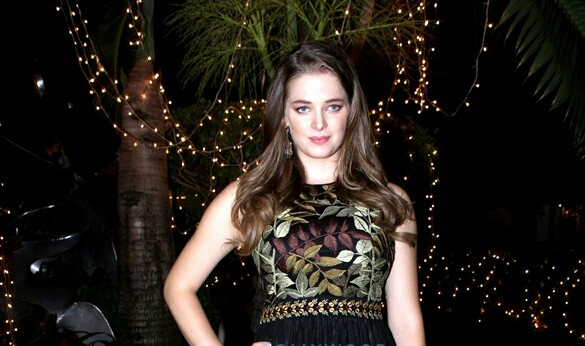
- Kaar at special screening of Shivaay in 2016
- Born: Erika Marta Karkuszewska; October 3, 1988 (age 37); Warsaw, Poland
- Occupation: Actress
- Spouse: Maciej Bielski

Erika Kaar, born Erika Marta Karkuszewska, is a Polish actress.

== Career ==
In 2018, she graduated from the Aleksander Zelwerowicz National Academy of Dramatic Art in Warsaw. Kaar's first screen role was in the 2014 BBC miniseries The Passing Bells, where she played a Polish nurse, the love interest of one of the two leads. She was a lead actress in the 2015 Polish television series Aż po sufit! Her film debut was in the Indian Bollywood movie Shivaay (2016) directed by Ajay Devgan. In 2017, she appeared in Starz's TV series American Gods, playing Zorya Polunochnaya.

== Personal life ==
Kaar married Maciej Bielski, who is a lawyer in Warsaw.

== Filmography ==
Year	Title	Role	Notes
2014	The Passing Bells (BBC miniseries)	Joanna (main cast)	
2014	Blondynka (TV series)	Barber (1 episode)	
2015	Aż po sufit! (TV series)	Natalia Domirska (leading role)	
2015	Bodo (TV series)	Hania (4 episodes)	
2016	Shivaay	Olga (leading role)	Bollywood movie
2017	Bodo (feature film)	Hania	
2017	American Gods	Zorya Polunochnaya	
2020	The Elements of Sasza – Fire (TV series)	Henrietta	
