= List of awards and nominations received by Ajay Devgn =

Ajay Devgn awards and nominations
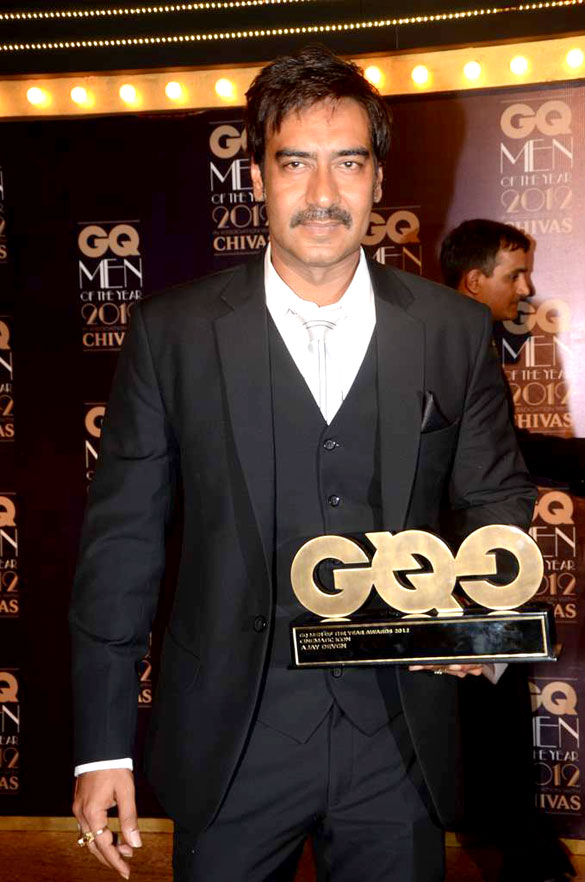
- Devgn at GQ Men of the Year Award at 2012
Awards and nominations
Award	Wins	Nominations
National Film Awards	4	0
Filmfare Awards	3	10
Bengal Film Journalists' Association Awards	2	0
Producers Guild Film Awards	1	4
Zee Cine Awards	1	11
BIG Star Entertainment Awards	0	4
Global Indian Film Awards	0	1
Stardust Awards	4	3
Screen Awards	3	3
Other awards	0	29

Totals (Note: Certain award groups do not simply award one winner. They acknowledge several different recipients, have runners-up, and have third place. Since this is a specific recognition and is different from losing an award, runner-up mentions are considered wins in this award tally. For simplification and to avoid errors, each award in this list has been presumed to have had a prior nomination.)
- Wins: 19
- Nominations: 65

Ajay Devgn is an Indian actor, film producer and director who appears in Bollywood films. He has received 32 awards, including four National Film Awards, four Filmfare Awards, one Zee Cine Award and four awards each from Screen and Stardust awards ceremonies.

Devgn made his acting debut in 1991 with a leading role in Phool Aur Kaante, for which he garnered the Filmfare Award for Best Male Debut. In 1995, Devgn starred in action-drama Naajayaz for which he received a nomination for Filmfare Award for Best Actor. For his portrayal of his role in the 1998 political drama film Zakhm, he was awarded the first National Film Award for Best Actor, Screen Award for Best Actor, Bollywood Movie Award for Best Actor (Critics) and a BFJA Award for Best Actor, in addition to a Filmfare Award for Best Actor nomination. For his role as a traditional Indian man in 1999 romantic drama Hum Dil De Chuke Sanam he earned a third nomination for the Filmfare Award for Best Actor.

In 2002, he starred in the biopic historical film The Legend of Bhagat Singh for which his portrayal of Bhagat Singh earned him his second National Film Award for Best Actor and a Filmfare Award for Best Actor (Critics). His portrayal of a Mumbai Underworld-based gangster in 2002 crime drama Company garnered him a Filmfare Award for Best Actor (Critics), in addition to a Screen Award for Best Actor and a Stardust Award for Star of the Year – Male. His portrayal of a psychopath killer in 2002 thriller film Deewangee earned him the Filmfare Award for Best Villain, along with a Screen Award, Bollywood Movie Award and a Zee Cine Award for the same category. His comic portrayal of a troubled Goan man in the 2009 comedy film All the Best earned him a Stardust Award for Best Actor in Comic Role and an IIFA Award for Best Comedian nomination. For his portrayal of an upright police officer in the 2011 action thriller film Singham garnered him a Stardust Award for Best Actor in Thriller/Action category and nominations for Best Actor at Filmfare and IIFA awards.

In addition to acting awards, Devgn won other several awards including Rajiv Gandhi Awards for Achievement in Bollywood, Most Profitable Celebrity of 2010 at ETC Bollywood Business Awards, Jasarat Award, NDTV Actor of the Year and the Padma Shri awards for his contributions towards the industry.

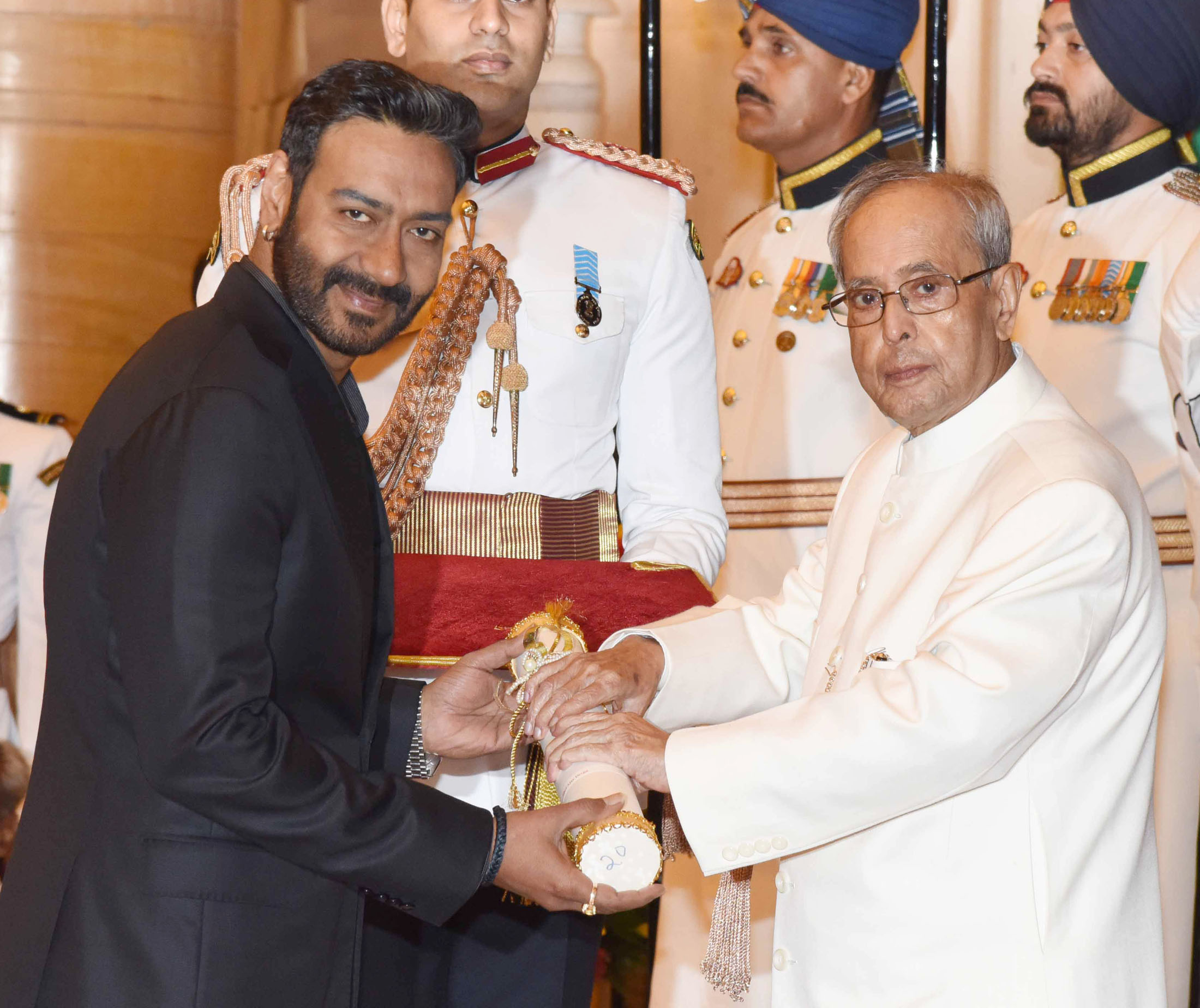
The President, Shri Pranab Mukherjee presenting the Padma Shri Award to Devgn, at a Civil Investiture Ceremony, at Rashtrapati Bhavan, in New Delhi on 28 March 2016.

== National Film Awards ==
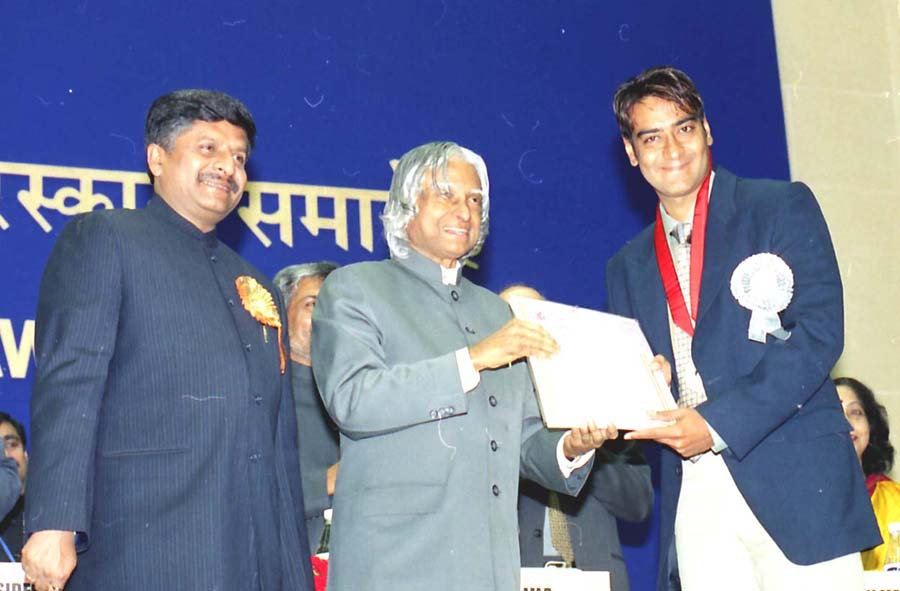
The former Indian President Dr. A.P.J. Abdul Kalam presenting the Best Film Actor Award for the year 2002 to Devgn (right) for his role in The Legend of Bhagat Singh at the 50th National Film Awards function in New Delhi, India on 29 December 2003.

The National Film Awards are awarded by the Government of India's Directorate of Film Festivals division for achievements in the Indian film industry. Devgn has received four awards.

Year	Nominated work	Category	Result	Ref.
1998	Zakhm	Best Actor	Won	
2002	The Legend of Bhagat Singh	Best Actor	Won	
2020	Tanhaji	Best Actor	Won	
2020	Tanhaji	Best Popular Film Providing Wholesome Entertainment (Producer)	Won	

== Filmfare Awards ==
Established in 1954, the Filmfare Awards are presented annually by The Times Group to members of the Hindi film industry. Devgn has won three awards.

Year	Nominated work	Category	Result	Ref.
1992	Phool Aur Kaante	Best Male Debut	Won	
1996	Naajayaz	Best Actor	Nominated	
1999	Zakhm	style="background: #FFE3E3; color: black; vertical-align: middle; text-align: center; " class="no table-no2 notheme"|Nominated		
2000	Hum Dil De Chuke Sanam	style="background: #FFE3E3; color: black; vertical-align: middle; text-align: center; " class="no table-no2 notheme"|Nominated		
2002	Lajja	Best Supporting Actor	Nominated	
2003	The Legend of Bhagat Singh & Company	Best Actor (Critics)	Won	
2003	Deewangee	Best Villain	Won	
2003	Company	Best Actor	Nominated	
2004	Gangaajal	Best Actor	Nominated	
2005	Khakee	Best Villain	Nominated	
2006	Kaal	Best Villain	Nominated	
2011	Once Upon a Time in Mumbaai	Best Actor	Nominated	
2012	Singham	Best Actor	Nominated	
2021	Tanhaji	Best Actor	Nominated	
2021	Tanhaji	Best Film	Nominated	
2023	Drishyam 2	Best Actor	Nominated	
2025	Maidaan	Best Actor	Nominated	

== Bengal Film Journalists' Association Awards ==
Bengal Film Journalists Association Awards is given by "The Bengal Film Journalists' Association" is the oldest Association of Film critics in India, founded in 1937. Devgn has received two awards.

Year	Nominated work	Category	Result	Ref.
1998	Zakhm	Best Actor	Won	
2002	The Legend of Bhagat Singh	Best Actor	Won	

== Producers Guild Film Awards ==
The Producers Guild Film Awards (previously knows as Apsara Film & Television Producers Guild Awards) is an annual event originated by the Film Producers Guild of India. Devgn has received one award.

Year	Nominated work	Category	Result	Ref.
2009	All the Best	Best Actor in a Comic Role	Won	
2009	London Dreams	Best Actor in a Negative Role	Nominated	
2010	Raajneeti	Best Actor in a Supporting Role	Nominated	
2010	Once Upon a Time in Mumbaai	Best Actor	Nominated	
2011	Singham	Best Actor	Nominated	

== Filmfare Awards South ==
Year	Nominated work	Category	Result	Ref.
2024	RRR	Best Supporting Actor – Telugu	Nominated	

== Zee Cine Awards ==
The Zee Cine Awards are an annual award ceremony organised by the Zee Entertainment Enterprises. Devgn has received one award.

Year	Nominated work	Category	Result	Ref.
2000	Hum Dil De Chuke Sanam	Best Actor	Nominated	
2002	Lajja	Best Actor in a Supporting Role	Nominated	
2003	Company	Best Actor	Nominated	
2003	The Legend of Bhagat Singh	Best Actor	Nominated	
2003	Deewangee	Best Actor in a Negative Role	Won	
2004	Gangaajal	Best Actor	Nominated	
2006	Apaharan	Best Actor	Nominated	
2006	Kaal	Best Actor in a Negative Role	Nominated	
2007	Omkara	Best Actor	Nominated	
2011	Once Upon a Time in Mumbaai	Best Actor	Nominated	
2012	Singham	Best Actor	Nominated	
2016	Drishyam	Best Actor	Nominated	

== BIG Star Entertainment Awards ==
Year	Nominated work	Category	Result	Ref.
2010	Special Award	Film Actor of the Decade	Nominated	
2010	Once Upon a Time in Mumbaai	Most Entertaining Film Actor	Nominated	
2011	Singham	Most Entertaining Film Actor	Nominated	

== Global Indian Film Awards ==
Year	Nominated work	Category	Result	Ref.
2006	Omkara	Best Actor	Nominated	

== Stardust Awards ==
Year	Nominated work	Category	Result	Ref.
2002	Company	Star of the Year – Male	Won	
2009	All the Best	Star of the Year – Male	Nominated	
2009	All the Best	Best Actor – Comedy / Romance	Won	
2010	Once Upon a Time in Mumbaai	Best Actor – Thriller/Action	Won	
2010	Once Upon a Time in Mumbaai	Star of the Year – Male	Nominated	
2010	Atithi Tum Kab Jaoge	Best Actor – Comedy / Romance	Nominated	
2017	Shivaay	Breakthrough Performance – Male	Won	

== Screen Awards ==
Year	Nominated work	Category	Result	Ref.
1998	Zakhm	Best Actor	Won	
2002	Company	Best Actor	Won	
2002	Deewangee	Best Actor in a Negative Role	Won	
2002	The Legend of Bhagat Singh	Best Actor	Nominated	
2003	Gangaajal	Best Actor	Nominated	
2004	Khakee	Best Actor in a Negative Role	Nominated	
