= The Elements of Sasza – Fire =

Polish crime drama television series

- Polish poster
- Polish: Żywioły Saszy. Ogień
- Genre: Crime drama
- Based on: Cztery żywioły Saszy Załuskiej series by Katarzyna Bonda
- Written by: Dorota Chamczyk; Daria Rogozińska; Dana Łukasińska; Michał Wawrzecki; Katarzyna Bonda
- Directed by: Kristoffer Rus
- Starring: Magdalena Boczarska
- Composer: Karim Martusewicz
- Country of origin: Poland
- Original language: Polish
- No. of seasons: 1
- No. of episodes: 7

Production
- Executive producers: Dariusz Goczał; Mikołaj Wit
- Producer: Dorota Chamczyk
- Cinematography: Karina Kleszczewska
- Editors: Piotr Kmiecik; Wojciech Mrówczynski
- Running time: 41–45 minutes
- Production company: Bongo Media Production

Original release
- Network: Player
- Release: 17 November 2020

The Elements of Sasza – Fire (Polish: Żywioły Saszy. Ogień) is a Polish crime drama television series based on the Cztery żywioły Saszy Załuskiej series by Katarzyna Bonda. It began airing on Player on 7 November 2020.

== Premise ==
Sasza Załuska is a criminal profiler assigned to a case of mysterious arson attacks in the city of Łódź.

== Cast ==
- Magdalena Boczarska as Sasza Załuska
- Piotr Cyrwus as Commander Karol "Flaku" Albrycht
- Mirosław Haniszewski as Commissioner Jacek "Cuki" Borkowski
- Andrzej Konopka as Inspector Wojciech "Drugi" Szkudłapski
- Erika Karkuszewska as Officer Henrietta
- Marcin Czarnik as Commissioner Piotr "Duch" Duchnowski
- Aleksandra Konieczna as Marta Gajka, Adam's mother
- Arkadiusz Jakubik as Aleksander Krysiak
- Jerzy Trela as "Grandpa"
- Jędrzej Hycnar as Adam Gajek, Marta's son
- Piotr Srebrowski as Łukasz Polak
- Maria Pakulnis as Laura Załuska, Sasza's mother
- Natalia Wolska as Karolina Załuska, Sasza's daughter
- Mikołaj Woubishet as Abdullah
- Ewa Konstancja Bułhak as Mrs. General
- Paulina Walendziak as Kalina
- Sebastian Stankiewicz as Mieczysław "Cybant" Orkisz
- Agnieszka Wosińska as Wiesia Jarusik
- Krzysztof Dracz as Leon Ziębiński

== Episodes ==
No.	Title	Duration	Original release date
1	"Episode 1"	41 min	17 November 2020
2	"Episode 2"	45 min	24 November 2020
3	"Episode 3"	45 min	1 December 2020
4	"Episode 4"	45 min	8 December 2020
5	"Episode 5"	42 min	15 December 2020
6	"Episode 6"	43 min	22 December 2020
7	"Episode 7"	43 min	29 December 2020

== Production ==
The series was filmed in Łódź beginning in October 2020.
