= Dil Kya Kare =

1999 Indian film by Prakash Jha

- Directed by: Prakash Jha
- Story by: Prakash Jha
- Produced by: Veeru Devgan; Veena Devgan; Kumaar Mangat
- Starring: Ajay Devgn; Kajol; Mahima Chaudhry; Chandrachur Singh
- Cinematography: Rajan Kothari
- Edited by: Prakash Jha
- Music by: Jatin–Lalit
- Production companies: Devgan Entertainment & Software; Devgan Arts
- Release date: 24 September 1999
- Country: India
- Language: Hindi
- Budget: ₹9 crore
- Box office: ₹19.69 crore

Dil Kya Kare (English: What Should The Heart Do?) is a 1999 Indian Hindi-language family drama film, directed by Prakash Jha and produced by Veeru Devgan and Veena Devgan. The film stars Ajay Devgn, Kajol, Mahima Chaudhry and Chandrachur Singh.

== Plot ==
Anand lives happily with his wife Kavita and daughter Neha, whom the couple adopted after Kavita suffered a miscarriage and ensuing infertility. Kavita is good friends with Som Datt, whose love for her has remained unrequited since their college days.

Kavita becomes worried when she learns of a strange woman who has been visiting Neha regularly at school. Kavita soon confronts the woman, who introduces herself as "Nandita" and requests to spend more time with Neha. Kavita invites her into her home as a guest, but deeply buried secrets surface when Nandita and Anand come face-to-face. It is revealed that they are Neha's biological parents.

Years before, Anand and Nandita were strangers traveling on a train when thugs hijacked the train and attacked Nandita. Anand saved Nandita's life and the two ended up spending the night together, resulting in Anand cheating on his wife, Kavita, to whom he was married at the time. Anand and Nandita never exchanged words, aside from sleeping together and once the train stops at a station, Nandita gets off, without waking up Anand, never having come to know even his name or his whereabouts and likewise for Anand about Nandita. Unknown to Anand, Nandita becomes pregnant with his child, but since she is unmarried and does not know the father, Nandita's father forces her to give up the baby for adoption. In a twist of fate, Anand and Kavita lost their unborn baby in an accident, and end up going to the orphanage to adopt a baby, who is only 7 days old, which unknown to anyone, is Anand and Nandita's baby, Neha. They raise her for years until Nandita tracks them down, unaware this is the same house of the man she slept with years earlier. When Anand finds Nandita in his home, who Kavita invited to spend time with Neha, both are startled at seeing each other and become afraid Kavita will find out about his infidelity.

Anand and Nandita try to hide their past from Kavita. Anand tries many times to speak with Nandita, even going to one of his remote sites where a building is being constructed and pretends to make blank calls to his house, with his wife answering each time, getting annoyed at what she believes is a person prank calling her home. When the phone rings again, Kavita asks Nandita, who is sitting nearby, to answer the phone to see who it is, and when Nandita goes to answer the phone, Anand, recognizing that it's Nandita, tells her to come to the site where he is waiting, as he wants to meet her in person. When Kavita asks Nandita who it was, Nandita lies and says there was no one on the other end, and it was a blank call.

Kavita learns the truth and is overcome with jealousy and rage, convinced that Anand and Nandita have been having an affair. Anand protests and tries to explain that he never knew he was Neha's biological father, and that her adoption was a coincidence. Kavita refuses to believe him and leaves the house. Feeling betrayed, she contemplates leaving Anand. In the meantime, Anand and Nandita enjoy a fun day out with Neha at her insistence. Kavita soon files for divorce.

At the courthouse, Anand begs Kavita to reconsider. Nandita, who has always regretted giving Neha up, promises to leave the couple alone on one condition – that she take Neha with her. Kavita becomes frantic, as she refuses to give up Neha, and Anand reluctantly supports Nandita after realizing how desperate she is to keep Neha.

When Nandita realizes that Anand and Kavita truly love Neha and are not ready to give her up, she concludes that she should leave Neha in their care.

Anand is shocked at this and runs to the train station. He makes it just in time to see Nandita on the moving train, looking back at him with tearful eyes.

== Cast ==
- Ajay Devgan as Anand Kishore
- Kajol as Nandita Rai
- Mahima Chaudhry as Kavita Kishore
- Chandrachur Singh as Som Dutt
- Farida Jalal as Nandita's aunt
- Laxmikant Berde as Ram Dulare Sinha
- Akshita Garud as Neha Kishore
- Mohan Joshi as Nandita's Father
- Anant Mahadevan as DCP Krishan Kumar
- Rajpal Yadav as a School Watchmen
- Avtar Gill as a Lawyer
- Rajendra Gupta as a Lawyer
- Dinesh Hingoo
- Neelu Kohli
- Achla Sachdev
- Aroon Bakshi
- Sameer Dharmadhikari
- Pushpa Varma
- Manohar Singh
- Yogi Singh

== Reception ==
=== Critical response ===
Indolink.com ranked the film the best film of 1999, writing " We have got to hand it to the marvelous performances and complex characters for keeping our interest in Dil Kya Kare. They help give the film the base it needs for credibility. If only Jha had made it a darker and less glamourous [sic] product, it would have had phenomenal success with the classes. The masses are certainly going to have a tough time watching, understanding and appreciating this inappropriately packaged flick. Of course, for those of you who like a bit of novelty and acting tour de forces, Dil Kya Kare is better than a thousand Taals and Hum Aapke Dil Mein Rehate Hains combined.

Conversely, Sharmila Taliculam of Rediff wrote, "Throughout the film, one gets the feeling that Jha’s heart wasn’t in this film. It could have been a good film, if it had been treated properly. But all we can say is that it remains a disappointment." Anupama Chopra of India Today wrote, "Jha can't match the emotional finesse of Masoom. His performers are competent - Chaudhary, big on lipstick and histrionics is as excellent as Kajol - but his writing is flawed. And DKK remains, a well-crafted but half-baked soap opera."

=== Box office ===
Dil Kya Kare grossed $285,000 in the US and £204,547 in UK. In the second weekend the film grossed $54,000.

== Soundtrack ==
Dil Kya Kare

Soundtrack album by Jatin–Lalit
- Released: 1999
- Genre: Feature film soundtrack
- Label: Sony BMG
- Producer: Jatin–Lalit

Jatin–Lalit chronology
Saazish (1998)	Dil Kya Kare (1999)	Dillagi (1999)

Professional ratings
Review scores
Source	Rating
Planet Bollywood	6.5/10 stars
Apun Choice	3/5 stars

#	Title	Singer(s)	Length
1	"Dil Kya Kare"	Udit Narayan, Alka Yagnik	04:27
2	"Menu Lagan Lagi"	Sukhwinder Singh, Jaspinder Narula	05:52
3	"Do Dilon Ki"	Udit Narayan, Anuradha Paudwal	05:37
4	"Badal Bijli" (not in the film)	Abhijeet Bhattacharya, Children	04:36
5	"Rang Lage Lo" (Not in the film)	Abhijeet Bhattacharya, Alka Yagnik	06:04
6	"Monday Bhi Ho Sunday"	Abhijeet Bhattacharya, Kavita Krishnamurthy, Children	04:07
7	"Dil Kya Kare" (Sad)	Alka Yagnik, Kumar Sanu	02:57
8	"Pyar Ke Liye"	Alka Yagnik	05:03
