= Hindustan Ki Kasam (1999 film) =

1999 Indian film by Veeru Devgan

- Theatrical Release Poster
- Directed by: Veeru Devgan
- Written by: Janak-Hriday (script); Tanveer Khan (dialogues)
- Screenplay by: Veeru Devgan
- Produced by: Veeru Devgan
- Starring: Amitabh Bachchan; Ajay Devgn; Manisha Koirala; Sushmita Sen; Farida Jalal; Prem Chopra; Shakti Kapoor; Kader Khan
- Cinematography: Ishwar Bidri
- Edited by: Suresh Chaturvedi
- Music by: Sukhwinder Singh
- Production company: Devgans Films
- Release date: 23 July 1999
- Running time: 159 minutes
- Country: India
- Language: Hindi
- Budget: ₹130 million
- Box office: ₹250.4 million

Hindustan Ki Kasam (transl.: Swear on India) is a 1999 Indian Hindi-language action film directed by Veeru Devgan and starring Amitabh Bachchan, Ajay Devgn (first movie in a double role), Manisha Koirala and Sushmita Sen, along with Kader Khan in a special appearance. For a change, actors like Prem Chopra and Shakti Kapoor featured in positive roles. The film was an average grosser, despite taking a bumper opening. The movie broke the opening day record in India at the time of its release and managed to do average business at the box office.

== Plot ==
A mother gives birth to twins one was named as "Raju" and another was named as "Ajay". The twins' father was an Indian Army officer who died in the war. Unfortunately, they are separated at the childhood age at the end of the war when their father was celebrating their recent success in a battle with Pakistan. One of the twins end up in the neighboring Pakistan and is brought up as a Muslim renamed as Tauheed (Ajay Devgn) whose eyes are of silver colour. He was brought up by a terrorist who told him that his mother had died in an attack of the Indian army, while the other grows up as a Hindu named Ajay Malhotra (also Ajay Devgn). Ajay is a novelist.

The movie begins with a montage of India's diversity and the Wagah border ceremony, as a song describes India's agelessness, sanctity, patriotism, and the Partition of India.

A boy runs in a city with an Indian flag in his hand to celebrate India's 50th Independence Day. He gives it to his impatient father, who grabs the flag by the cloth. An old man kicks the flag off the father's hand, introduces himself as Kabira (Amitabh Bachahan), and rebukes him for his lack of respect for India. He had lost his right arm. When the boy and several others applaud Kabira, Kabira tells them not to clap for him, but to be more active in loving their country and protecting it from attack. He asks them to say "Jai Hind", and they repeat and salute him.

An Indian commander discusses his strategy to several military officers to stop Pakistan's attacks, by suggesting that evidence for Pakistan's terrorist activities should be collected and presented before the United Nations Organisation, which will then condemn Pakistan as a terrorist state. Meanwhile, a soldier hijacks a Pakistani aeroplane and tells the pilot (Aziz Kashmiri, an intelligence officer) to give to him a floppy disk. He and the pilot fight, and the pilot parachutes out of his aeroplane. The soldier jumps out of the airplane, and continues fighting the pilot in mid-air. He kills the pilot, retrieves the floppy disk, and uses the pilot's parachute to glide his way to the ground.

The Indian commander later holds a meeting with his officers about the pilot's plane crash, and tells them to work prudently to expose whoever who was responsible. In an airport, Ajay has his picture taken by a photojournalist and permits him to publish his picture. A woman arrives and asks him to sign his autograph, as she is a fan of his novels. When she asks him about where did he get his ideas, Ajay said that it was a trade secret, and leaves. The photojournalist asks the fan to let her sign his autograph, but she refuses and leaves.

At home, Ajay's mother asks him about his conference, and the photojournalist asks for food, which Ajay's mother prepares for him. As the photojournalist eats his food, she receives a government pension from a postman. Ajay asks his mother on why did she take alms, but his father Kabira answers that she is not taking alms, but respect. Kabira then lectures him about the contributions of India's freedom fighters who fought against foreign rule, with Netaji Subhas Chandra Bose as an example of a patriot.

On a street, Priya (Sushmita Sen) asks Ajay to take her on his motorcycle to the airport to get to the Miss Universe competition, and he performs several stunts to navigate through traffic and he confesses his love for her, until he wakes up from his daydream. Ajay sees Priya (as Miss India) on television winning second place in the competition, and goes to an airport to congratulate Priya. They fall in love.

Two Indian officers snatch a copy of Ajay's novel, and give it to their commander as proof of the murder of one of their officers, Major Chawla in New York. The Indian commander asks them to bring Ajay to him for interrogation. After he promises his mother to bring Priya home, Ajay and the photojournalist depart by airplane to Srinagar for photography. The Indian officers visit Ajay's house and inform their commander about Ajay's location.

Pajirao Marathe films a terrorist base near Srinagar that sought to take over the Kashmir region, and fights an Ajay-lookalike. He is then stabbed by the Ajay-lookalike, who takes his film recording away. When the two Indian officers report this to their commander, their commander uses a film of his military training to show that Ajay had also received military training as a commando, but was rejected from being a soldier due to his poor eyesight, and that Ajay is also planning his own schemes.

The real Ajay and Priya dance at a New Year's party, and was seized by the officers. The commander interrogates him about Pajirao's murder, which Ajay denies any involvement, and tells him that the events of his stories (which resembled the murders) were inspired by his dreams. Priya returns to Ajay's home and informs his mother that he has gone missing. Ajay's mother later informs Kabira about Ajay's disappearance. After the commander orders Ajay to be tortured, one of the officers suggests that they use hypnosis to extract the origin of his novels' plots, and they send Ajay to Dr. Dastoor (Kader Khan). During the session, Ajay recalls his childhood (where he recalls several children hiding from enemy soldiers), his shooting of a Pakistani army chief and his officer from his helicopter, and using that helicopter to kill the officer's truck. The commander then orders his officers to observe Ajay carefully.

Ajay returns home, and asks his mother about the "Aunt Geeta" that he had heard in his dreams. Ajay's mother shows him a photograph of their family, and recounts the Pakistani-led raid that took away his brother Raju and killed Aunt Geeta when the family visited an army base to celebrate the end of the Indo-Pakistani War of 1971. Kabira adds that he was also there when he lost his right arm to a grenade thrown by a Pakistani soldier, who also took Raju away before his very eyes. When the family visits Dr. Dastoor, he explains that Ajay and Raju have a sort of bond that affects both of them if one of them is affected. Dr. Dastoor also adds that the incidents that Ajay sees in his dreams are his brother's experiences, and Ajay requests that he should not tell his mother about his brother's shared experiences.

With the ongoing rivalry and hatred between the two countries, both find themselves on the opposite side, and must battle each other. The only way they can unite is by saving the life of the Prime Minister of Pakistan, who himself has become the target of terrorists. And somehow both the brothers team up and save the Pakistan Prime Minister and brings him at the spot safely. At the time Kabira hits Jabbar and brings him to the same spot, Jabbar's phone fells down they all hears that Nawab is on a call with Jabbar and asking him that "are you succeed to kill Pakistan Prime Minister"? Nawab learns that Jabbar is trapped with them and also arrives that his plan has been failed. Pakistan police arrests Nawab, after that Jabbar tries to shoot Ajay but Raju comes between to save his brother. Raju gets shot on his chest and he falls into his mother's hand, on the spot all army leaders shoot and kills Jabbar. Raju asks his mother that "why two brothers like India and Pakistani people are made to separate" his mother replies crying that even God does not know the answer for this question. Indian Prime Minister also arrives at the same place, Kabrira starts his speech that "how these both brothers are separated like that brothers like Indian and Pakistani people are also been separated because of people like Jabbar, why they don't want to stay unitedly?". After that both Prime Ministers of India and Pakistan shake hands with each other, at the end of the scene it is shown that barricades of the India and Pakistan border are removed and people of India and Pakistani people are united happily by holding candles, Roshanaara's (Manisha Koirala) soul also feels happy by seeing that India and Pakistan are united.

== Cast ==
- Amitabh Bachchan as Kabeera/Baba
- Ajay Devgn as Ajay Malhotra/Raju ‘Tauheed’ Malhotra (dual role)
- Sushmita Sen as Priya
- Manisha Koirala as Roshanaara
- Farida Jalal as Mrs. Malhotra, Ajay’s and Raju’s ‘Tauheed’ mother
- Prem Chopra as Brigadier B. S. Brar
- Navin Nischol as Chander Malhotra "Tauheed a.k.a Raju & Ajay's father"
- Shakti Kapoor as Major Verma
- Kader Khan as Dr Dastoor
- Gulshan Grover as Jabbar
- Shahbaz Khan as Lt. Gen. Haider (ISI) Chief
- Pramod Moutho as Pakistani Prime Minister
- Goga Kapoor as Tauheed's trainer (special appearance)
- Arjun as Major Chawla
- Kashmera Shah as a cameo

== Box office ==
The film was released on 23 July 1999 at 335 screens layouts on budget of (₹13 cr).

=== India ===
The first day the film had collected (₹14.5 million) and first weekend collection was (₹41.7 million). First week collection was (₹7,10,00,000) and India gross collection was (₹23,95,00,000). Worldwide gross first weekend collection was (₹8,04,24,000) and first week collection of worldwide gross was (₹13,47,35,000), total worldwide gross collection was (₹26,64,70,000) and adjusted net gross collection was (₹1,09,17,21,840). Total netgross collection was (₹13,96,50,000) and film declared as "Average" at Box Office India.

=== Overseas ===
Schedule	Schedule wise collections
Overseas Boxoffice	(First Weekend); US$200,000
Overseas Boxoffice	(First Week); US$290,000
Overseas Boxoffice	(Total gross); US$620,000
International	(First Weekend); US$108,917
International	(Total netgross); US$311,000

The film was rated at 3.4/10 stars and it was the 11th-highest-grossing film of 1999 at Box Office India.

== Soundtrack ==
The music's were composed by Sukhwinder Singh and the lyrics were written by Anand Bakshi. The film is also remembered for the song "Jalwa Jalwa".

Track listing
No.	Title	Playback	Length
1.	"Jalwa Jalwa"	Udit Narayan, Sukhwinder Singh, Jaspinder Narula	05:52
2.	"Tere Dil Ke Pass"	Sonu Nigam, Asha Bhosle	06:25
3.	"Akhiya Akhiya"	Udit Narayan, Alka Yagnik	05:00
4.	"Tere Dil Man"	Sadhana Sargam	00:54
5.	"Mai Dil Nahin Lagada"	Alka Yagnik	05:27
6.	"Mai Hindustan Hoon"	Sukhwinder Singh	07:07
7.	"Love Love"	Abhijeet Bhattacharya, Poornima	04:31
8.	"Yara Teri Ghoot"	Sadhana Sargam	00:59
9.	"Ranjana Ve"	Alka Yagnik	05:27
10.	"Ishq Barandi"	Sukhwinder Singh	03:38
11.	"Is Pyaar Sarhad Ke"	Anuradha Paudwal, Sukhwinder Singh	04:40
12.	"Hindustan Ki Kasam"	Chorus	01:05

"Qadam Qadam Badhaye Ja", the regimental quick march of the Indian National Army of Subhash Chandra Bose, is used in the segment where Bose makes his speech.
