= Ajay Devgn =

Indian actor and filmmaker (born 1969)

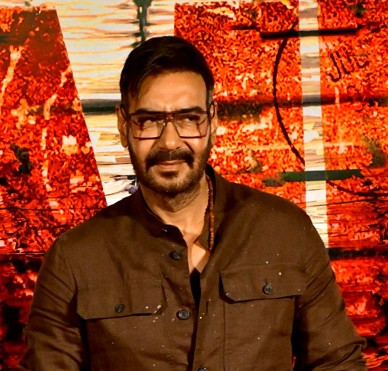
- Devgn in 2025
- Born: Vishal Veeru Devgan; 2 April 1969 (age 57); New Delhi, India
- Education: Mithibai College
- Occupations: Actor; producer; director
- Years active: 1991–present
- Works: Full list
- Spouse: Kajol (m. 1999)
- Children: 2
- Father: Veeru Devgan
- Family: Devgan; Mukherjee
- Awards: Full list
- Honours: Padma Shri (2016)
- Website: ajaydevgnffilms.com

Vishal Veeru Devgan (born 2 April 1969), professionally known as Ajay Devgn, is an Indian actor, film director and producer who mainly works in Hindi films. He has appeared in over 100 films and has won numerous accolades, including four National Film Awards and four Filmfare Awards. In 2016, he was honoured by the Government of India with the Padma Shri, the country's fourth-highest civilian honour.

Devgn made his film debut with the action romance Phool Aur Kaante (1991), which established him as a leading star. He went on to star in action films such as Jigar (1992), Vijaypath (1994), Suhaag (1994), Dilwale (1994), Diljale (1996), Jaan (1996), Major Saab (1998) and Kachche Dhaage (1999), as well as romantic films including Ishq (1997), Pyaar To Hona Hi Tha (1998) and Hum Dil De Chuke Sanam (1999). His dramatic performance in Zakhm (1998) earned him the National Film Award for Best Actor. In the 2000s, Devgn saw limited commercial success, but gained critical acclaim for films, including Company (2002), The Legend of Bhagat Singh (2002), Gangaajal (2003), Khakee (2004), Raincoat (2004), Apaharan (2005), Golmaal: Fun Unlimited (2006), and Omkara (2006). For portraying Bhagat Singh in The Legend of Bhagat Singh, he received his second National Film Award for Best Actor and the Filmfare Critics Award for Best Actor.

He made a comeback in 2010 with three back-to-back hits, Golmaal 3, Raajneeti and Once Upon a Time in Mumbaai and continued to star in several commercially successful ventures, such as Singham (2011), Bol Bachchan (2012), Son of Sardaar (2012), Singham Returns (2014), Drishyam (2015), Golmaal Again (2017), Raid (2018), Total Dhamaal (2019), Shaitaan (2024), Raid 2 (2025) and Dhamaal 4 (2026). His highest-grossing releases include Tanhaji (2020), Drishyam 2 (2022), and Drishyam: The Conclusion (2026). For playing the title role in Tanhaji, he won his third National Film Award for Best Actor. Devgn owns the production company Ajay Devgn FFilms, established in 1999. He frequently collaborates with filmmaker Rohit Shetty and is married to actress Kajol, with whom he has two children.

== Early life and background ==
Devgn was born Vishal Virender Devgan on 2 April 1969 in New Delhi to a Punjabi Hindu family originally from Amritsar, Punjab, India. The family has connections to the Hindi film industry in Mumbai. Devgn's father, Virender "Veeru" Devgan, was a stunt choreographer and action-film director and his mother, Veena Devgan, is a film producer. His cousin, Anil Devgan, was a filmmaker and screenwriter. Devgn graduated from the Silver Beach High School in Juhu and then studied at Mithibai College.

== Personal life ==
=== Relationships and family ===
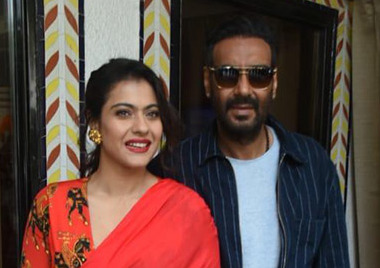
Devgn with his wife Kajol in 2020

Devgn began a relationship with the actress Karisma Kapoor while filming Jigar (1992), however, the couple ended their relationship in 1995. That same year, Devgn's relationship with the actress, Kajol, began whilst they were co-starring in Gundaraj (1995). The media called them "an unlikely pair" due to their contrasting personalities. On 24 February 1999, the couple married in a traditional Maharashtrian Hindu ceremony at the Devgan home. The couple has two children. Their daughter, Nysa, was born 20 April 2003 and their son, Yug, was born 13 September 2010. Devgn and Kajol stored their newborn son's umbilical cord blood and tissues to act as a source of stem cells in case of serious ailment.

=== Religion ===
He is a practising Shaiva Hindu who prominently wears a rudraksha which, along with other religious themes, features in his films.

=== Name change ===
In August 2009, Devgn changed the spelling of his surname Devgan to Devgn, at the request of his family.

== Career ==
=== Rise to prominence (1991–1999) ===
As Devgn entered the film industry in 1991, he changed his stage name from his birth name, Vishal, to "Ajay" due to several other actors named Vishal being launched at the same time, including Manoj Kumar's son. He began his professional career alongside Madhoo in the action romance Phool Aur Kaante, which earned him the Filmfare Award for Best Male Debut. In his opening scene, Devgn performed a split while balancing between two motorcycles. His next film was Jigar (1992), a Bollywood martial arts film co-starring Karisma Kapoor. It was released on Diwali weekend and became the seventh-highest-grossing film of that year, taking ₹7 crore (US$750,000) at the box office.

In 1993, Devgn starred in Dil Hai Betaab, a film about a revengeful love triangle. He next featured in Divya Shakti and then Sangram, a story of enmity between two fathers. Devgn then worked with Deepak Bahry, who directed the action film Ek Hi Raasta, and with Deepak Pawar, who directed Platform. Other releases that year were Shaktiman, Dhanwan and Bedardi.

In 1994, Devgn starred in Harry Baweja's romantic action film Dilwale. He played the part of Arun Saxena, a man with intellectual impairment. It was the tenth-highest-grossing film of the year. His next release was Kanoon and then Kuku Kohli's Suhaag with Akshay Kumar. The film was about two friends. Devgn played Ajay Sharma/Malhotra. Suhaag was the seventh-highest-grossing film of the year. His next film was Vijaypath. Shooting dates for Vijaypath clashed with those of Karan Arjun which Devgn declined. Vijaypath was the eighth-highest-grossing film of the year.

In 1995, Devgn appeared alongside Juhi Chawla in Mahesh Bhatt's Naajayaz, which earned him his first nomination for the Filmfare Award for Best Actor, followed by Hulchul directed by Milan Luthria, alongside Kajol. Devgn and Kajol then appeared in Gundaraj which did not perform well at the box office. His next release was Haqeeqat co-starring Tabu. This film was the eleventh-highest-grossing film of the year.

In 1996, Devgn starred in the action film Jung with Mithun Chakraborty, Rambha and Aditya Pancholi. His next release was an action movie called Jaan, with Twinkle Khanna. He then starred in Harry Baweja's film Diljale, where he played a terrorist named Shaka.

In 1997, Devgn starred in the poorly-received, Itihaas, with Twinkle Khanna. His next release was Indra Kumar's romantic comedy Ishq with Aamir Khan, Juhi Chawla and Kajol. In this successful film, Devgn played Ajay, a rich boy in love with a poor girl, played by Kajol. The film grossed ₹30 crore (US$3.2 million) and emerged as the fourth-highest-grossing film of the year.

In 1998, Devgn starred in Major Saab with Amitabh Bachchan and Sonali Bendre where he played the character of an army officer. It was a hit and the tenth-highest-grossing film of the year. He next starred with Kajol in Anees Bazmee's second film, the romantic comedy Pyaar To Hona Hi Tha, a remake of the 1995 American film French Kiss. It grossed ₹38.27 crore (US$4.1 million) at the box office and emerged a superhit. Devgn's next release was Mahesh Bhatt's drama Zakhm, which examines communal tension in Mumbai during the 1993 Bombay riots. Devgn played a man who is fed up with religious conflict. Devgn won several awards for his critically acclaimed performance, including the National Film Award for Best Actor and the Screen Award for Best Actor, in addition to his second nomination for the Filmfare Award for Best Actor.

In 1999, Devgn starred in the musical romance Hum Dil De Chuke Sanam, in which he played Vanraj, a man who tries to help his wife (Aishwarya Rai) reunite with her lover (Salman Khan). Hum Dil De Chuke Sanam marked a significant turning point in Devgn's career. The film, an adaptation of Maitreyi Devi's Bengali novel Na Hanyate, was directed by Sanjay Leela Bhansali and co-starred Salman Khan and Aishwarya Rai. Devgn's performance received positive reviews from critics. Rediff said: "Ajay's role reminds you of one he did in another film, Pyaar Toh Hona Hi Tha. There he is searching for the boyfriend of the girl he secretly loves. But intense scenes are his forte and he does well here. He's particularly good in the scene where he gets exasperated with his wife's stubbornness and strives to keep his cool." The film proved to be a commercial success and earned Devgn his third nomination for the Filmfare Award for Best Actor. After that, he appeared in Hindustan Ki Kasam with Amitabh Bachchan and Sonali Bendre. He then worked with the director Milan Luthria in Kachche Dhaage, with Saif Ali Khan and Manisha Koirala. It was a box-office hit. He then performed in another successful film Hogi Pyaar Ki Jeet, a romantic comedy; and then in his home production with Kajol and director Prakash Jha, titled Dil Kya Kare. His other movies in 1999 were Gair and Thakshak in which he played a strong, silent man.

=== Career fluctuations and critical acclaim (2000–2009) ===
Devgn began the new decade with two biggies, Deewane and Raju Chacha (which he also produced). Both the films opened to mixed critical reception, but proved to be box office flops. The downturn continued in 2001 with all three of his releases, including Yeh Raaste Hain Pyaar Ke, Lajja and Tera Mera Saath Rahen failing to do well commercially.

2002 proved to be a key year for Devgn as he starred in three films of contrasting genres. He first appeared in Ram Gopal Varma's Company which was a fictional examination of the Mumbai underworld. The film proved to be a moderate commercial success and Devgn's performance received critical acclaim. As Taran Adarsh reviewed: "Devgn enacts his role to perfection. A controlled performance, the actor takes to this complex character like a fish takes to water. He underplays his part with admirable ease." Devgn's next release was David Dhawan's comedy Hum Kisise Kum Nahin, with Amitabh Bachchan, Sanjay Dutt and Aishwarya Rai. The same year, he played the role of Bhagat Singh, in Rajkumar Santoshi's biopic The Legend of Bhagat Singh. His performance was well received by critics. Taran Adarsh said, "Devgn has lived the role. To state that he is excellent would be an understatement. His performance is bound to win admiration from audience, besides fetching awards." The film was released on 7 June 2002 and went on to win two National Film Awards, including the National Film Award for Best Feature Film in Hindi, and three Filmfare Awards, including the Filmfare Award for Best Film (Critics). Despite these awards, and Devgn winning his second National Film Award for Best Actor for his performance, the film was a box office disaster. Devgn then went on to perform in Anees Bazmee's Deewangee which was partially inspired by William Diehl's novel, Primal Fear. He jointly won the Filmfare Award for Best Actor (Critics) for his performance in Company and The Legend of Bhagat Singh, in addition to receiving his fourth nomination for the Filmfare Award for Best Actor for the former. For his performance in Deewangee, he received several awards including the Filmfare Award for Best Villain, the Screen Award for Best Villain and the Zee Cine Award for Best Villain.

In 2003, Devgn starred in Ram Gopal Verma's horror film Bhoot, opposite Urmila Matondkar. The film was appreciated critically and emerged a hit at the box office. He then starred in the action thriller Qayamat: City Under Threat with the debutante actress, Neha Dhupia, which proved to be an average fare. Devgn next performed in Milan Luthria's romantic film Chori Chori, opposite Rani Mukherji and Sonali Bendre. This film did not succeed at the box office. Devgn's next release of the year was Prakash Jha's Gangaajal. The film was set in the time of the 1980 Bhagalpur blindings in Bihar. Rediff.com said, "Ajay Devgan pulls up an ace with a part tailormade to reinforce his seething-under-the-surface angry hero image. To his credit (and the director's), he brings style and grace to a largely stereotypical, righteous protagonist. To a great extent, his presence covers up the film's patchiness in the second half." Devgn received his fifth nomination for the Filmfare Award for Best Actor for his performance in the film. He concluded the year with Rohit Shetty's directorial debut, the actioner Zameen and J. P. Dutta's war film LOC Kargil about the Kargil War.

In 2004, Devgn was cast with Amitabh Bachchan, Aishwarya Rai and Akshay Kumar in Rajkumar Santoshi's action thriller Khakee. The film was released on 23 January 2004. It received positive reviews and became one of the highest-grossing films of 2004. In Khakee, Devgn once again played a villain. His performance as a police officer turned murderer was well received by critics. Taran Adarsh said: "Ajay Devgan adds yet another feather in his cap with a performance that could've been played only by a master performer. His confrontations with Amitabh Bachchan are exemplary." He received his second nomination for the Filmfare Award for Best Villain for his performance in the film. Devgn then appeared in Indra Kumar's highly successful sex comedy Masti and Mani Ratnam's critically acclaimed political action film Yuva. He next collaborated with Rituparno Ghosh in the relationship drama Raincoat, with Aishwaraya Rai. The film is an adaptation of O. Henry's The Gift of the Magi. Raincoat met with wide critical acclaim and won the National Film Award for Best Feature Film in Hindi. Devgn was praised for his performance. Rediff said: "Hesitation, desperation, humiliation – Ajay Devgn conveys them eloquently. His Manoj is no cool dude, but just another lower middle-class guy in misery, with whom none would like to switch place. He particularly stands out in the scenes where he cries in the bathroom, or begs Neeru not to marry someone else."

2005 was a less successful year for Devgn, with five of his films not proving to be successful at the box office. They included Insan, Blackmail, Main Aisa Hi Hoon, Tango Charlie and Shikhar. However, the films Kaal and Apaharan did well. His performance as a villain in Kaal also earned him his third nomination for the Filmfare Award for Best Villain. In 2006, Devgn played Othello in Omkara, a Hindi adaptation of William Shakespeare's Othello. It was directed by Vishal Bhardwaj. The film is a tragedy of sexual jealousy set against the backdrop of the political system in Uttar Pradesh. It premiered at the 2006 Cannes Film Festival and was screened at the Cairo International Film Festival. Omkara was well received by critics. Rediff said: "Othello is a tricky role, a leading man eclipsed by the villain. Yet the Moor is a brooding and compelling character, and Ajay Devgn does valiantly with his material. Omkara strips Othello of the racism, exchanging his black skin for surprisingly inconsequential half-Brahminism. Ajay's best bits are when restrained, and while there is a bit of a seen-that feel to his character, by the time the film is over, you realise just how unflinchingly solid he's been." Taran Adarsh said: "Ajay makes a stirring and powerful interpretation of a man haunted by uncertainty about his lover's faithfulness. The serious look that Ajay carries suits him to the T. Of course, Ajay is exceptional in the film and looks every inch the character he portrays." The same year, Devgn also starred in Rohit Shetty's buddy comedy film Golmaal, which was a hit and spawned three sequels. In 2007, he starred in two films, director Anubhav Sinha's Cash and Ram Gopal Varma's Aag, both of which were commercially unsuccessful.

In 2008, Devgn starred in the social film Halla Bol, directed by Rajkumar Santoshi, alongside Pankaj Kapoor and Vidya Balan. The film is based on the life of activist Safdar Hashmi, who was killed in 1989 by political rivals while performing in the street play Halla Bol. The film received negative reviews and was a flop at the box office. The same year, Devgn also starred in Rohit Shetty's third film Sunday. He then took the lead role with Kajol in his own directorial debut film U Me Aur Hum. Although the film flopped, it earned positive reviews for his performance as well as for his direction. Rediff said: "His character grows, discovers both shirt-buttons and subtlety, delivering an intense acting job. Speaking almost entirely in platitudes – pithy at first, profound as he goes on – this grows into an extraordinarily well-written character, replete with flaws and relatability. The way he treats his remorse, drunkenly pointing every finger at himself around a dinner table, is superbly handled, as is his guilty struggle to delineate his life experience from his professional opinion." Devgn also made a cameo appearance in his brother Anil Devgan's film Haal-e-Dil. He then starred in Afzal Khan's Mehbooba. Again in 2008, Devgn starred in Rohit Shetty's comedy Golmaal Returns, a sequel to the 2006 film Golmaal about a mistrustful wife who believed her husband was unfaithful. The Indian Express said the screenplay was derivative, concluding: "There is nothing particularly new about a suspicious wife keeping tabs on her husband, and there is nothing particularly new in the way Ajay-Kareena play it." Golmaal Returns was a major commercial success with global revenues of ₹80 crore (US$8.5 million). In 2009, Devgn had two releases, Rohit Shetty's comedy film All the Best: Fun Begins and Vipul Amrutlal Shah's London Dreams, which also co-starred Salman Khan. Both the films were hugely anticipated before release, but due to negative critical reception, All the Best could only manage average business, while the latter was a commercial failure.

=== Resurgence (2010–2019) ===
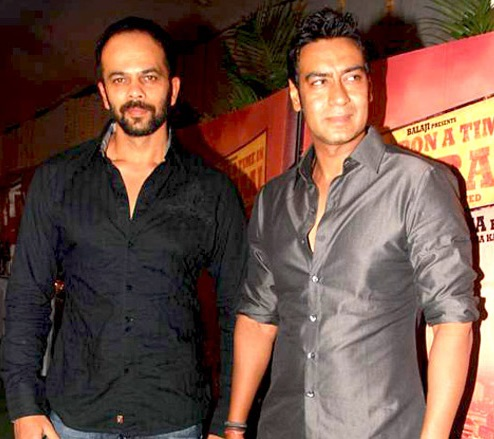
Devgn with Rohit Shetty at the success bash of Once Upon a Time in Mumbaai in 2010

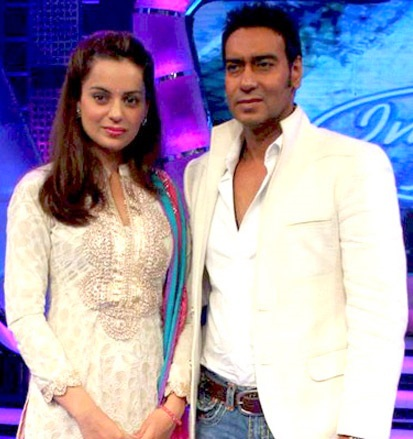
Devgn with Kangana Ranaut at success party of Once Upon a Time in Mumbaai in 2010

In 2010, Devgn featured in the financially successful comedy Atithi Tum Kab Jaoge? with Paresh Rawal and Konkona Sen Sharma. He then featured in Prakash Jha's political thriller Raajneeti. Raajneeti was released internationally on 4 June 2010, after some controversies regarding similarities between actual people and the characters in the film. There were also issues about the use of the national anthem in the film. The film was made with a budget of ₹60 crore (US$6.4 million) At release, it received positive reviews and emerged a superhit at the box office. Again, in 2010, Devgn starred in Milan Luthria's Once Upon a Time in Mumbaai, which was among the top-grossing films of that year. Both the film and Devgn's performance were well received by the critics. Taran Adarsh said: "Ajay Devgn is splendid as Sultan. The actor had enacted a similar role in Company, but it must be said that his interpretation is so different in Once Upon A Time in Mumbaai. He adds so much depth to the character, which only goes to prove his range and versatility. This is, without a trace of doubt, Ajay's finest work so far." Komal Nahta said: "Ajay Devgn is simply fantastic in the role of Sultan Mirza. So real is his performance that it looks like he was born to play this role. Right from his look to his acting including dialogue-delivery, everything is fabulous. Indeed, an award-winning performance!"

Devgn then starred in Priyadarshan's action-thriller film Aakrosh which explores the subject of honour killings. Aakrosh received some positive reviews, but was financially unsuccessful. At the end of 2010, Devgn worked again with Rohit Shetty in Golmaal 3, a sequel to Golmaal Returns (2008). Although, like its predecessor, the film received mixed reviews, it was the most successful of the Golmaal series, earning more than ₹169 crore (US$18 million) and emerging a blockbuster. Devgn also worked as an actor and voice artist in Toonpur Ka Superrhero, a live action animated film.

In 2011, Devgn performed with Emraan Hashmi in Madhur Bhandarkar's comedy Dil Toh Baccha Hai Ji. He was a narrator in Yamla Pagla Deewana and also made a cameo appearance in Ready. Devgn starred in Rohit Shetty's Singham. Taran Adarsh said: "The title means 'Lion' and Ajay is in the centre of the battle between good and evil. Ajay is well known for the lines, "aataa maajhi satakli". The embodiment of screen masculinity, Ajay enacts the central character of a righteous, hardhearted cop with flourish. He brings alive on screen a larger-than-life hero character with determined conviction, which renders you thunderstruck. One of the few actors who underplays his part admirably, he returns to the over-the-top-action genre of films with this one. In a nutshell, his performance plays a pivotal role in carrying the film to the winning post." Singham earned him his seventh nomination for the Filmfare Award for Best Actor. He then starred David Dhawan's action comedy film Rascals.

The following year, Devgn starred in Tezz, directed by Priyadarshan. His co-stars were Anil Kapoor, Boman Irani, Kangana Ranaut, Sameera Reddy and Zayed Khan. Devgn then starred in Rohit Shetty's film Bol Bachchan. He then starred in Son of Sardaar. In 2013, Devgn featured in the critically and commercially unsuccessful Himmatwala, a remake of the 1983 film of the same name. Devgn next featured in Prakash Jha's political drama Satyagraha.

In 2014, Devgn featured in Rohit Shetty's Singham Returns, a sequel to Singham. Singham Returns received mixed reviews from Indian critics. Taran Adarsh of Bollywood Hungama gave it 4 stars and said: "The film is a complete mass entertainer with power-packed drama, hi-intensity dialogue and towering performances as its aces. The brand value attached to it coupled with a long weekend will help the film reap a harvest and rule the box office in days to come." It had dollections of over ₹32.09 crore (US$3.4 million) on the first day of its release in India with a domestic net of ₹140.62 crore (US$15 million). Devgn next featured in Prabhu Deva's Action Jackson which did not perform well at box office.

In 2015, Devgn starred in Drishyam, directed by Nishikant Kamat. The film received positive reviews, Meena Iyer of The Times of India gave the film four out of five stars, describing it as "A suspense drama with a nail-biting finish." She praised Devgn's performances: "Ajay, who is the prey here, shines in his role of the protective father." The film was successful at the box office, by the end of its sixth week, the film had grossed about ₹76.48 crore (US$8.2 million) at the domestic box office.

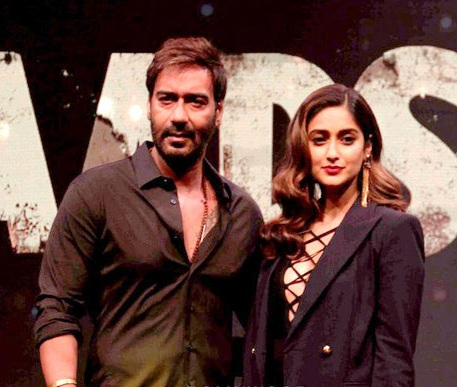
Devgn with Ileana D'Cruz during the trailer launch of their film Baadshaho in 2017

In 2016, Devgn was seen in his own production, Shivaay, which released around Diwali 2016. Shivaay is an action drama movie. Shivaay opened to mixed reviews and grossed more than ₹146 crore (US$16 million). In 2017, Devgn featured in director Milan Luthria's Baadshaho and Rohit Shetty's Golmaal Again. While Baadshaho flopped, the latter emerged a blockbuster collecting 100 crores in 4 days of its release and a lifetime collection of 205 crores at the Indian box office while making a hefty 310 crores at worldwide box office.

In 2018, Devgn starred in Raj Kumar Gupta's Raid where he plays the role of an honest Indian Revenue Service officer, which released to positive critical feedback on 16 March, and was a commercial success. Devgn has long been working on producing Sons of Sardaar: The Battle of Saragarhi, a sequel to Son of Sardaar. In August 2017, Devgn stated: "We are working on the script but it won't happen for another two years because of the scale of the project." In 2019, he appeared in two back-to-back comedies, Total Dhamaal and De De Pyaar De, which were released in a gap of 84 days. Commercially, both the films proved to be successful ventures at the box office and ended the decade on a high note for Devgn.

=== Commercial peak (2020–present) ===
In 2020, Devgn portrayed the role of 17th-century military leader Tanaji Malusare in an eponymously titled film, Tanhaji; directed by Om Raut. The film was released on 10 January 2020 and went on to win three National Film Awards, including the Best Popular Film Providing Wholesome Entertainment and Best Actor, both for Devgn, in addition to his eighth nomination for the Filmfare Award for Best Actor Tanhaji earned ₹367.65 crore worldwide, making it the highest-grossing Indian film of 2020. Moreover, it marked Ajay Devgn's 100th film as an actor.

In 2021, he starred alongside Sanjay Dutt, Sharad Kelkar, Nora Fatehi and Sonakshi Sinha in a historical film based on the Indo-Pakistani war of 1971, Bhuj: The Pride of India. He had a cameo in Rohit Shetty's Sooryavanshi, reprising his role as DCP Bajirao Singham from the Singham film series, now expanded into Rohit Shetty's Cop Universe.

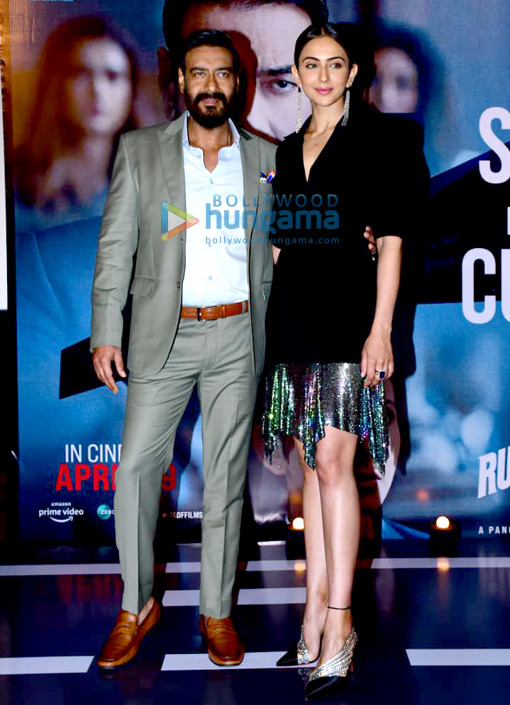
Ajay Devgn and Rakul Preet Singh at the second trailer launch of Runway 34 in Delhi.

In 2022, Devgn made his OTT debut with the web series, Rudra: The Edge of Darkness, on Disney+ Hotstar. The same year, he released his third directorial, Runway 34. It received positive reviews from both the critics and audience, but failed at the box office. He was also seen in extended cameo appearances in Sanjay Leela Bhansali's Gangubai Kathiawadi and S. S. Rajamouli's RRR, for which he received high praise. Later that year, Devgn was seen as Chitragupt in Indra Kumar's Thank God, which also starred Sidharth Malhotra, which turned out to be a commercial failure. Later he starred in the sequel to Drishyam, Drishyam 2, directed by Abhishek Pathak. It became a major critical and commercial success, along with becoming his second highest-grossing film of his career, after Tanhaji. The following year, Devgn starred and directed the Hindi remake of the Tamil film Kaithi (2019), Bholaa, his third directorial. The film was a critical and commercial disappointment.

In 2024, Devgn had four major releases. The first was the horror film Shaitaan, which received a favorable response from critics and emerged a huge hit at the box office. He then appeared in Amit Ravindernath Sharma's third directorial venture Maidaan, which saw him portraying Indian football coach Syed Abdul Rahim. Although the biopic and Devgn's performance received highly positive reviews, the film was a financial failure. His next release, Neeraj Pandey's Auron Mein Kahan Dum Tha was also a box office flop, this time to mixed to negative reviews. Devgn's final release of that year, the fifth installment of Rohit Shetty's Cop Universe, the actioner Singham Again took an initial of ₹437 million and collected ₹3.89 billion (US$42 million) worldwide. Despite underperforming at the box office, it emerging as his highest-grossing movie as well as the sixth highest-grossing Indian film of 2024.

In 2025, Devgn did a guest appearance in his nephew Aaman Devgn's debut film Azaad, directed by Abhishek Kapoor. His first major release of the year, Raid 2, a sequel to his 2018 release Raid, emerged as a box-office hit, ranking as one of the highest-grossing Hindi films of the year. He next appeared in Son of Sardaar 2, a spiritual sequel to 2012 film Son of Sardaar. Released on 25 August, it opened to unfavorable critical reception and bombed at the box office. His next release, De De Pyaar De 2, a direct sequel to his 2019 film, also did not do well. This changed the following year with Dhamaal 4 (2026), which grossed around ₹2.24 billion (US$24 million) worldwide to emerge a commercial success and the 6th highest-grossing Hindi film of 2026.

== Other works ==
=== Production ===
Ajay Devgn FFilms (ADF) is an Indian film production and distribution company established by actor Ajay Devgn in 2000. Based in Mumbai, it mainly produces and distributes Hindi films. In 2000, ADF released its first film, Raju Chacha. The film starred Devgn himself as the lead actor and his wife Kajol as the lead actress. Raju Chacha received mixed reviews but grossed Rs 209.2 millions at the box office.

In 2008, Devgn co-produced the drama U Me Aur Hum, which marked his directorial debut. Devgn also played the lead role in the film, sharing the screen again with Kajol. The film was written by Devgn himself and three other writers. Critical reception was generally positive, with Taran Adarsh giving the film 4 out of 5 stars and describing it as "A well-made, absorbing love story that's high on emotional quotient".

In 2009, Devgn released and acted in his home production All the Best: Fun Begins, which was directed by Rohit Shetty and also starring, Sanjay Dutt, Fardeen Khan, Bipasha Basu and Mugdha Godse. The film was released on 16 October 2009 and received positive response from critics. It was rated a hit in India, and is the twelfth highest grossing Bollywood film of 2009.

In 2014, ADF produced Singham Returns starring Devgn and Kareena Kapoor. In 2016 Devgn produced and starred in Shivaay which is to be the most expensive film of his production.

In late December 2017, ADF collaborated with Fox Star Studios to produce Total Dhamaal starring Devgn, Riteish Deshmukh, Arshad Warsi, Javed Jaffrey, Madhuri Dixit, and Anil Kapoor.

In 2018, Ajay Devgn released his first Marathi film production Aapla Manus. A dramatic thriller written by Vivek Bele and directed by Satish Rajwade, it starred Nana Patekar, Iravati Harshe, and Sumeet Raghavan. It was produced by Ajay Devgn, Nana Patekar, Abhinav Shuklaa, Manish Mishra and Rohit Choudhary and released on 9 February 2018. The film was distributed by Viacom 18 Motion Pictures.

=== NY VFXWAALA ===
In October 2015, Devgn established a visual effects company, NY VFXWAALA, named after his children Nysa and Yug. It has been involved with many major films, such as Prem Ratan Dhan Payo, Tamasha, Bajirao Mastani, Mersal, Dilwale, Force 2, and Simmba. The company won the Best Special Effects award at the 64th National Film Awards for the film Shivaay (2016).

== In the media ==
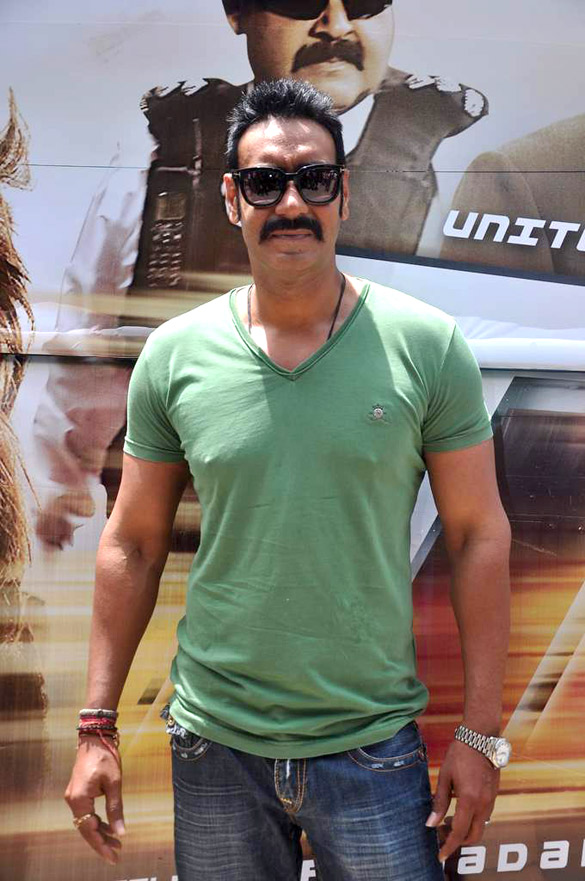
Devgn in 2012

Ashwini Deshmukh of Filmfare termed Devgn a "private person" who is self-confessedly uncomfortable around people and said, "Three decades in the industry and Ajay Devgn continues to enjoy the trust of filmmakers and the loyalty of his fans." Ankur Pathak of GQ noted, "Devgn has shown remarkable resilience as a bankable star who has never had to rely on a 'comeback' film since he never really goes off-screen." Sandeep Unnithan of India Today termed him a "versatile actor" and said, "Devgn is a darling of his directors." Rediff.com noted the actor's change from "lanky star son" to "back-to-back hits churner". It further credited him for popularising the "intense, brooding hero" looks.

Devgn is among the most popular and highest paid celebrities in India. He has frequently featured in the Forbes India's Celebrity 100 list since 2012. He peaked at the 10th position in 2018 with an estimated annual income of ₹745 million (US$8.0 million). In 2019, he was placed 12th, with an estimated annual income of ₹940 million (US$10 million). He was also inducted into the Bollywood Walk of Fame at Bandra Bandstand, where his hand print was preserved. Devgn was placed 7th in Rediff.com's list of Top 10 Actors of 2000–2010. In Rediff.com "Top Bollywood Actors" list, Devgn ranked 1st in 2002. He subsequently ranked 4th in 2004, 10th in 2006 and 2nd in 2019. In Eastern Eye's Sexiest Asian Men list of 2011, Devgn was placed 29th.

== See also ==
- List of Indian actors

== Bibliography ==
- Dawar, Ramesh (2006). Bollywood: Yesterday, Today, Tomorrow. Star Publications. ISBN 978-1-905863-01-3. Archived from the original on 31 December 2016.
- Bajaj, J.K. (2014). On & Behind the Indian Cinema. Diamond Pocket Books Pvt Ltd. ISBN 978-93-5083-621-7. Archived from the original on 4 July 2014.
