= Veeru Devgan =

Indian action-director (1934–2019)

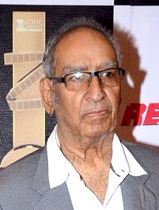
- Devgan at the 2016 Zee Cine Awards
- Born: Virender Harjidas Devgan; 25 June 1934; Amritsar, Punjab, British India (present-day Punjab, India)
- Died: 27 May 2019 (aged 84); Mumbai, Maharashtra, India
- Occupations: Action choreographer; director; actor
- Years active: 1974–2019
- Organisation: Devgan Films
- Spouse: Veena Devgan (m. 1968)
- Children: 3 including Ajay Devgn
- Relatives: Kajol (daughter-in-law)
- Family: Devgan family

Virender Harjidas Devgan (25 June 1934 – 27 May 2019), known professionally as Veeru Devgan, was an Indian action choreographer, film director, and producer known for his work in Hindi cinema. Over the course of his career, he contributed to more than 200 films, with notable titles including Roti Kapada Aur Makaan (1974), Mr. Natwarlal (1979), Kranti (1981), Prem Rog (1982), Ram Teri Ganga Maili (1985), Aaj Ka Arjun (1990), Phool Aur Kaante (1991) and Jigar (1992).

== Early life ==
Devgan began his journey in the film industry under challenging circumstances. At the age of 13, he ran away from his home in Punjab and arrived in Bombay without a train ticket. Facing financial hardship, he was even jailed and struggled to find food or shelter. He found temporary refuge by agreeing to wash a cab daily in exchange for a place to sleep.

Starting from menial jobs, Devgan eventually became a carpenter and got involved in the gang culture of the Sion-Koliwada area in Mumbai. His entry into the film industry came unexpectedly when renowned action director Ravi Khanna noticed him during a street fight. Impressed by his fighting skills, Khanna invited him to meet the following day, marking the beginning of Devgan's career as a stuntman and later a celebrated action director in Hindi cinema.

== Career ==
=== Action choreography ===
Devgan got his break with Manoj Kumar's Roti Kapada Aur Makaan (1974) and over the decades had choreographed fight and action scenes for over 100 different Hindi films including Mr. Natwarlal, Ek Khiladi Bawan Pattey, Phool Aur Kaante, Jigar, Dil Kya Kare etc.

Directors like Sanjay Gupta have considered him Hindi cinema's "greatest stunt director", and actors such as Dharmendra and Jeetendra would often do a movie on the sole basis of the film's stunts being supervised by Devgan. Actor Shatrughan Sinha has also called him Hindi cinema's "greatest action director", adding that Devgan was to stunts what Lata Mangeshkar was to playback singing and Saroj Khan to dance choreography, as all lead actors wanted to work with him to look "heroic." Devgan had also mentored the next generation of action directors, including Sham Kaushal.

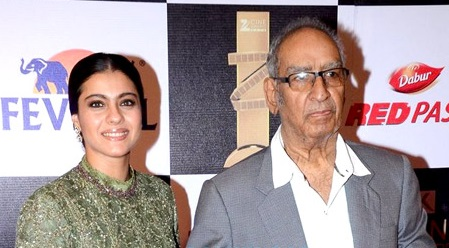
Devgan with daughter-in-law Kajol at Zee Cine Awards 2016.

=== Direction, production and acting ===
Devgan even ventured into direction with 1999 film Hindustan Ki Kasam which starred his son Ajay Devgn, Amitabh Bachchan, Manisha Koirala and Sushmita Sen. He also produced the film. The same year, he would produce another film with his son in the lead, Dil Kya Kare.

He also acted in a few films, mostly small roles, including in the 1981 film Kranti.

== Personal life ==
Born into the Devgan family in Amritsar, he was married to Veena, and had three children with her, a son, actor Ajay Devgn and two daughters, Kavita Devgan Vaswani and Neelam Devgan Gandhi.

Devgan, who rarely made public appearances, was last seen at the special screening of his son's film Total Dhamaal in February 2019.

== Death ==
Veeru Devgan died in the morning of 27 May 2019 in Mumbai, aged 84. Veeru Devgan had not been well for a while and old age and poor health made his health condition worse. He was suffering from breathing problems after which he was immediately admitted to the Surya Hospital, Santa Cruz. However, his condition got critical and resulted in cardiac arrest.

Releasing an official statement, the family said, 'With profound grief and sorrow, we regret to inform that Veeru Devgan, father of Ajay Devgan died. Funeral was held at Vile Parle West Crematorium at 6:00 pm on 27 May 2019.'

== Filmography ==
=== As action director ===
- Gair (1999)
- Lal Baadshah (1999)
- Itihaas (1997)
- Ishq (1997)
- Sanam (1997)
- Diljale (1996)
- Prem Granth (1996)
- Jaan (1996)
- Haqeeqat (1995)
- Prem (1995)
- The Don (1995)
- Chauraha (1994)
- Dilwale (1994)
- Divya Shakti (1993)
- Chandra Mukhi (1993)
- Gurudev (1993)
- Roop Ki Rani Choron Ka Raja (1993)
- King Uncle (1993)
- Jai Kaali (1992)
- Qurbani Rang Layegi (1991)
- Phool Aur Kaante (1991)
- Dancer (1991)
- Henna (1991)
- Pyar Hua Chori Chori (1991)
- Kurbaan (1991)
- Benaam Badsha (1991)
- Paap Ki Aandhi (1991)
- Veeru Dada (1990)
- Sheshnaag (1990)
- Kishen Kanhaiya (1990)
- Doodh Ka Karz (1990)
- Aaj Ka Arjun (1990)
- Izzatdaar (1990)
- Amiri Garibi (1990)
- Ladaai (1989)
- Shehzaade (1989)
- Tridev (1989)
- Prem Pratigyaa (1989)
- Mar Mitenge (1989)
- Singhasan (1986)
- Simhasanam (1986) Telugu Film
- Gyani Ji (1977) Punjabi Film
- Teri Meri Ik Jindri (1975), Punjabi film as assistant fight director credits name as Beeru
- Do Sher (1974) Punjabi film
- Roti kapada aur makan (1974) hindi film..introducing

=== As an actor ===
- Kranti (1981)
- Sourabh (1979)
- Singhasan (1986)
- Sar Utha Ke Jio (1979)
- Mr. Natwarlal (1979)

=== As producer ===
- Hindustan Ki Kasam (1999)
- Dil Kya Kare (1999)
- Raju Chacha (2000)

=== As assistant director ===
- Vishwatma (1992)
- Mera Pati Sirf Mera Hai (1990)

=== As director ===
- Hindustan Ki Kasam (1999)
