= Naajayaz =

1995 Indian film by Mahesh Bhatt

- Release Poster
- Directed by: Mahesh Bhatt
- Written by: Jay Dixit
- Produced by: Mukesh Bhatt
- Starring: Naseeruddin Shah; Ajay Devgn; Juhi Chawla; Deepak Tijori; Gulshan Grover; Reema Lagoo; Tiku Talsania
- Music by: Anu Malik
- Production company: Vishesh Films
- Release date: 17 March 1995
- Country: India
- Language: Hindi
- Budget: ₹3.25 crore
- Box office: ₹9.58 crore

Naajayaz (transl. Illegitimate) is a 1995 Indian action thriller film directed by Mahesh Bhatt and produced on a budget of ₹26.8 million. It was a critical and commercial success. It stars Ajay Devgn, Naseeruddin Shah, Juhi Chawla, Deepak Tijori, Gulshan Grover, Ashish Vidyarthi, Reema Lagoo, and Tiku Talsania. Naajayaz was theatrically released in India on 17 March 1995. Naajayaz received two nominations at the 41st Filmfare Awards: Best Actor for Devgn and Best Supporting Actor for Shah. It was later remade in Pakistan as Najiaz (1997) starting Nadeem, Babar Ali and Jan Rambo

== Plot ==
Inspector Jai (Ajay Devgn) is an upright and fearless cop who is given the job to take down the criminal empire of Raj Solanki (Naseeruddin Shah). Jai and his accomplice Inspector Sandhya (Juhi Chawla), who also happens to be his love, start taking down Raj's empire with gusto. But Raj's cronies and benefactors are not the only ones to be upset by this.

Raj has problems of his own. He does not want his son (Deepak Tijori) to turn into a criminal like him. Raj is also aware of his minion's (Gulshan Grover) discontent; he wants to start many criminal activities that even Raj will not do. Raj tries to stop Jai without applying pressure or brutality, only to meet Jai's mother (Reema Lagoo) and realize that Jai is his son. Now Raj finds himself in a real tight spot.

Jai's mother does not like Jai trying to take down Raj, but Jai is determined. After some time, Jai learns about his relationship with Raj, but continues his job nonetheless. Raj's legitimate son and his minion try to take down Jai individually, without knowing the secret.

How the story ends forms the plot of this film.

== Cast ==
- Naseeruddin Shah as Raj Solanki
- Ajay Devgan as Senior Inspector Jai Bakshi
- Juhi Chawla as Senior Inspector Sandhya
- Deepak Tijori as Deepak Solanki
- Reema Lagoo as Naina Bakshi, Jai's mother.
- Ashish Vidyarthi as Ratan
- Gulshan Grover as David
- Disco Shanti as Item Dancer
- Tiku Talsania as A.C.P Narayan Mathur
- Shri Vallabh Vyas as Pascal
- Makrand Deshpande as Street Singer
- Sharad Sankla as Constable Charlie
- Gavin Packard as David's goon

== Soundtrack ==
The music for this album was composed by Anu Malik. The biggest hit from soundtrack was the timeless song "Barsat Ke Mausam Mein", composed by Anu Malik and sung by Kumar Sanu and Roop Kumar Rathod. The song was written by Sudarshan Faakir.

=== Soundtrack ===
#	Title	Singer(s)	Lyricist
1	"Lal Lal Hoton Pe"	Kumar Sanu, Alka Yagnik	Indeewar
2	"Barsaat Ke Mausam Mein"	Kumar Sanu, Roop Kumar Rathod	Sudarshan Faakir
3	"Kya Tum Mujhse Pyar Karte Ho"	Kumar Sanu, Alka Yagnik	Indeewar
4	"Tujhe Pyar Karte Karte"	Sonu Nigam	Rahat Indori
5	"Ek Kadam Tera Ek Kadam Mera"	Kumar Sanu, Alka Yagnik	Rahat Indori
6	"Darwaza Khula Chod"	Alka Yagnik, Ila Arun	Maya Govind
7	"Tujhe Pyar Karte Karte"	Alka Yagnik	Rahat Indori
