= Jigar =

1992 Indian film by Farogh Siddique

- Film poster
- Directed by: Farouq Siddique
- Written by: Tanveer Khan (dialogues); Naeem-Ejaz (dialogues); Veeru Devgan (idea)
- Screenplay by: Farooque Siddiqui; Lalit Mahajan
- Produced by: Saba Akhtar; Salim Akhtar; Samad Akhtar; Shama Akhtar
- Starring: Ajay Devgn; Karisma Kapoor
- Cinematography: Akram Khan
- Edited by: Suresh Chaturvedi
- Music by: Anand–Milind
- Production company: Aftab Pictures
- Release date: 23 October 1992
- Running time: 174 minutes
- Country: India
- Language: Hindi

Jigar is a 1992 Indian Hindi-language martial arts film directed by Farogh Siddique.It is the 2nd movie of Ajay Devgn. It was released during the Diwali weekend and proved to be major a successful hit. The plot is inspired by the 1989 American film Kickboxer.

== Plot ==
Raju and Duryodhan are very good friends. Suman, who is like a sister to Duryodhan, is Raju's love interest. Duryodhan is a wrestler who works at a martial arts training school owned by Lal Bihari. Following a misunderstanding involving Raju, Duryodhan and Raju's sister, Duryodhan rapes her. Raju is furious, but he is unable to avenge his sister because Duryodhan is a wrestler. Raju starts training as a fighter under Baba Thakur. After completing his training, he avenges all his enemies. Duryodhan is killed in the ring, and Lal Bihari is killed by Suman.

== Cast ==
- Ajay Devgan as Raj Verma "Raju"
- Karishma Kapoor as Suman
- Paresh Rawal as Lal Bihari
- Ajit Khan as Baba Thakur
- Arjun as Duryodhan
- Sukanya Kulkarni as Umaa, Raju's sister
- Ishrat Ali as Corrupt Police Inspector Manish Pandey
- Salim Khan as Roshan Gupta
- Gulshan Grover as Inspector Pradhan
- Aruna Irani as Raju's mother
- Jamuna as Doctor Ganga
- Yunus Parvez as Seth
- Goga Kapoor as Kaalia
- Shashi Kiran as Inspector Khan
- Gurbachan Singh as Henchman of Duryodhan
- Cheetah Yagnesh Shetty as Baba Thakur Assistant
- Khosrow Khaleghpanah as Arjun

== Soundtrack ==
The music was composed by Anand–Milind while Sameer penned the songs. The song Pyar Ke Kagaz proved to be the biggest hit of the album. The album managed to feature in the top selling albums of 1992. Singers Kumar Sanu, Abhijeet, Pankaj Udhas, Udit Narayan, Sadhana Sargam, Mohammad Aziz & Kavita Krishnamurthy contributed their voice. After a dispute over Dil (1990) between Anand–Milind and Alka Yagnik, she stopped working with them for two years.

#	Title	Singer(s)
1	"Pyar Ke Kagaz Pe"	Abhijeet, Sadhana Sargam
2	"Tujhko Bahon Mein Bhar"	Udit Narayan, Sadhana Sargam
3	"Ek Pal Ek Din"	Pankaj Udhas, Sadhana Sargam
4	"Mere Dil Ko Karrar"	Udit Narayan, Sadhana Sargam
5	"Log Barson Juda"	Kavita Krishnamurthy
6	"Mohabbat Hai Khushboo"	Mohammad Aziz
7	"Aaye Hum Barati"	Kumar Sanu, Kavita Krishnamurthy

== Box office ==
The film was major hit at the box office and one of the highest-grossing films of the year.
