= Shivaay =

2016 Indian film by Ajay Devgn

- Film poster
- Directed by: Ajay Devgn
- Written by: Sandeep Srivastava; Robin Bhatt
- Story by: Uday Khunti
- Produced by: Ajay Devgn
- Starring: Ajay Devgn; Sayyeshaa; Erika Kaar; Abigail Eames; Vir Das; Girish Karnad; Saurabh Shukla
- Cinematography: Aseem Bajaj
- Edited by: Dharmendra Sharma
- Music by: Mithoon; Guest Composition: Jasleen Royal
- Production companies: Ajay Devgn Films; Pen Studios; NH Studioz
- Distributed by: Reliance Entertainment
- Release date: 28 October 2016
- Running time: 162 minutes
- Country: India
- Language: Hindi
- Budget: ₹100 crore
- Box office: est.₹170.95 crore

Shivaay is a 2016 Indian Hindi-language action thriller film directed and produced by Ajay Devgn under his banner Ajay Devgn Films from a story written by Sandeep Shrivastava. The film stars Devgn in the title role along with debutante actresses Sayyeshaa, Abigail Eames and Erika Kaar in lead roles. The film's soundtrack and film score is composed by Mithoon. British band The Vamps and composer Jasleen Royal also contributed to the music.

Shivaay was released on 28 October 2016 coinciding with the Diwali weekend. It completed more than 50 days at the box-office. It won the 64th National Film Award for Best Special Effects in 2017. The film was screened at the 2017 Shanghai International Film Festival on 17 June 2017.

== Plot ==
Shivaay is a skilled mountaineer who makes a living by providing treks and climbing expeditions to tourists. One day, Shivaay saves Olga, a Bulgarian tourist, from an avalanche, and they eventually fall in love. Olga becomes pregnant but does not want the child. Shivaay begs her to give him the child, after which he says he will not stop her. Nine years later, Shivaay leads a happy life with his mute daughter Gaura until she discovers that Olga is still alive and in Bulgaria. Gaura insists Shivaay take her to Bulgaria. Despite his old sorrows, Shivaay finally agrees to take her to Bulgaria, where he saves a young child from child traffickers. Shivaay seeks the Indian Embassy's help in tracing Olga and is assigned to Anushka. Led by crime baron Ustinov and his right-hand man, Changez, the traffickers kidnap Gaura.

Shivaay chases the van, destroying various cars, but loses the van and is arrested by the Bulgarian police, charged with murder and trafficking. While in the police van, Shivaay imagines the officers in the van to be the same masked traffickers, and he attacks them, throwing out every single officer. The van accidentally falls off a dam, and the police think that Shivaay is dead, but Shivaay escapes by jumping from the van due to his skills and survives. Anushka tries to talk Shivaay into surrendering, but he refuses and instead escapes when the police arrive. Shivaay brings one of the saved prostitutes from a brothel to Anushka's home to help her out. Anushka, who misunderstood Shivaay earlier, agrees to help him. Having seen the television coverage of Shivaay, Olga joins him, where they seek Wahab's help to recover the CCTV footage of Shivaay's various chases.

Ustinov's henchman, Ivanovich, arrives there and is beaten up badly, where he reveals Ustinov's location. To protect himself, Changez murders Ivanovich and Ustinov. Shivaay discovers that Gaura has been taken away to be sold into the flesh trade. Shivaay chases after the transport van carrying his daughter off to Romania. A prolonged and vicious fight ensues as Changez, revealed to be Sgt. Nikolai of the Bulgarian Police, attacks Shivaay, but gets killed by the latter in the snow-covered mountains. Gaura is reunited with Olga, who is now married to a wealthy Bulgarian, whom Shivaay thinks can provide Gaura with every comfort. He does not want to lose Gaura, but he heavy-heartedly leaves for the airport thinking his daughter is best happy with her new father. However, Gaura later arrives at the airport, and hits Shivaay in extreme anger for leaving her behind and thinking she wants to stay there. Shivaay apologises, and Gaura ends up crying in his arms.

== Cast ==
- Ajay Devgn as Shivaay, a tourist guide, mountaineer and Gaura's father
- Sayyeshaa as Anushka, a budding IFS officer at the Indian embassy in Sofia, Bulgaria
- Erika Kaar as Olga, Shivaay's former lover and the mother of Gaura
- Abigail Eames as Gaura (Maharishi Gaura), Shivaay's young daughter with his former lover, Olga
- Vir Das as Wahab, an expert computer hacker who has a crush on Anushka
- Girish Karnad as Anushka's father
- Markus Ertelt as Changez/Sgt. Nikolai
- Saurabh Shukla as Sharma, Anushka's boss in the Indian embassy in Sofia, Bulgaria
- Bijou Thaangjam as Kancha, Shivaay's friend

== Production ==
Principal photography began in November 2014, with the majority of filming taking place in Mussoorie, Bulgaria, and Hyderabad.

== Soundtrack ==
Shivaay

Soundtrack album by Mithoon, Jasleen Royal
- Released: 7 October 2016
- Recorded: Livingwatermusic, Studio One, Enzy Studios
- Genre: Feature film soundtrack
- Length: 24:30
- Label: T-Series
- Producer: Adityaa Kumar

Shivaay's soundtrack was composed by Mithoon with a guest vocal appearance by the British pop-rock band The Vamps. The lyrics were written by Sayeed Quadri and Sandeep Shrivastava.

On 11 September 2016 the title track, "Bolo Har Har Har", was released, sung by Mithoon, Mohit Chauhan, Sukhwinder Singh, Badshah, Megha Sriram Dalton, and Anugrah. The second song, "Darkhaast", was released on 22 September 2016, and featured vocals by Arijit Singh and Sunidhi Chauhan.

All music rights of Shivaay were acquired by T-Series.

=== Track listing ===
No.	Title	Lyrics	Music	Singer(s)	Length
1.	"Bolo Har Har Har"	Sandeep Shrivastava	Mithoon	Mithoon, Mohit Chauhan, Sukhwinder Singh, Badshah, Megha Sriram Dalton, Anugrah, The Vamps, Parthiv Gohil, Javed Ali, Daler Mehndi, Ash King & Abhijeet Sawant	4:56
2.	"Darkhaast"	Sayeed Quadri	Mithoon	Arijit Singh, Sunidhi Chauhan, Mithoon, Adityaa Kumar	6:14
3.	"Raatein"	Aditya Sharma	Jasleen Royal	Jasleen Royal	3:46
4.	"Tere Naal Ishqa"	Sayeed Quadri	Mithoon	Kailash Kher	5:53
5.	"Raatein" (Reprise)	Aditya Sharma	Jasleen Royal	Jasleen Royal	3:43
6.	"Bolo Har Har Har" (Remix)	Sandeep Shrivastava	Mithoon (Remix By DJ Veronika And Mafiya Munda Ft, Various Artists)	Mithoon, Mohit Chauhan, Badshah, Sukhwinder Singh, Megha Sriram Dalton, Anugrah	4:34
Total length:					24:30

== Release ==
Shivaay released on 28 October 2016. It released internationally in 60 countries including Germany, France, Italy, Austria, Switzerland, Denmark, and Chile. However, the film was not released in Pakistan.

The film's runtime was later reduced by 19 minutes, with the new trimmed version released in cinemas.

=== Piracy issue ===
On 27 October 2016, The Indian Express published that self-proclaimed film critic Kamaal R. Khan had uploaded the opening sequence of the film on Twitter, which he shot in a theater in Dubai. Devgn, the producer, was quoted saying that he would take legal action against Khan.

== Reception ==
=== Critical reception ===
Bollywood Hungama gave 3.5/5 stars and wrote "Shivaay is a perfect emotional thriller that scores high on the account of its breathtaking visuals, amazing action and a high octane performance". Dainik Jagran rated 3.5/5 stars and describes it as "full of emotion and action". Renuka Vyavahare of The Times of India gave 3/5 stars and wrote "Overall, Ajay is unstoppable in Shivaay but you wish he wasn’t! Laced with visual excellence, you applaud his film’s larger than life canvas but despite the efforts, his second directorial venture fails to engage you emotionally". Mumbai Mirror also rated the film 3/5 stars and states that the film "scores fairly on most accounts". Bollywood Life rated 3/5 stars and wrote "Ajay Devgn's directorial is all about its stunning visuals and breath taking action scenes". BookMyShow called the film a "perfect Diwali gift you can give yourself and your family this (Diwali) weekend".

Rajeev Masand for News18 gave 2/5 stars and wrote, "What Ajay Devgan the star deserved, was a sharper director and a better script. In the end, there's little else to Shivaay than the eye-watering locations (both in the Himalayas and in Bulgaria), and occasionally poignant moments between Devgan and the little girl who plays his daughter. Everything else is noise. Way too much noise". Namrata Joshi of The Hindu commented that the movie moves too slow, and "turns out almost three hours long with just a wisp of a story". Anna MM Vetticad of Firstpost described it as a heavy-handed, over-stretched film. Ananya Bhattacharya of India Today gave 1.5/5 stars and praised the cinematography but criticized the writing. Raja Sen of Rediff gave the film 1/5, calling it an "absolute catastrophe". Shubhra Gupta of The Indian Express gave 1/5 stars and wrote "The only thing your eye can rest on is the spectacular scenery. The rest is a bloated star vehicle"

== Box office ==
The four-week worldwide grossing of film was between ₹1.24 billion (US$13 million) and ₹1.46 billion (US$15 million).

=== India ===
Shivaay was released alongside Ranbir Kapoor's Ae Dil Hai Mushkil and collected ₹102.4 million from India on its opening day, which was less than Ae Dil Hai Mushkil's ₹13.30 crore domestic first day. Shivaay grossed more than ₹ 1.39 billion.

==== Overseas ====
The film collected ₹47.4 million (US$490,000) from North America (US and Canada), ₹7.8 million (US$81,000) from UK, ₹9.5 million (US$99,000) from Australia, ₹4.4 million (US$46,000) from New Zealand and ₹300,000 (US$3,100) from Malaysia.

== Awards ==
Awards	Category	Nominee	Status
National Film Awards	Best Special Effects	NY VFXWALA	Won
Star Screen Awards	Best Visual Effects	NY VFXWALA	Won
Star Screen Awards	Best Cinematography	Aseem Bajaj	Won
Star Screen Awards	Best Action	Jai Singh Nijjar	Won
Zee Cine Awards	Best Visual Effects	NY VFXWALA	Won
Zee Cine Awards	Best Cinematography	Aseem Bajaj	Won
Zee Cine Awards	Best Action	Jai Singh Nijjar	Won
Stardust Awards	Best Breakthrough Performance (Male)	Ajay Devgn	Won

== Game ==
Shivaay: The Official Game, an official game based on this film, was released by Zapak Mobile Games Pvt. Ltd., for Android mobile phone users.
